= Bullhead Lake =

Bullhead Lake may refer to:

== Lakes ==
In the United States:

- Bullhead Lake (Glacier County, Montana)
- Bullhead Lake in Chippewa River (Michigan)
- Bullhead Lake in Lake Eunice Township, Becker County, Minnesota
- Bullhead Lake in Kego Township, Cass County, Minnesota
- Bullhead Lake in Sugar Bush Township, Becker County, Minnesota
- Bullhead Lake in Kelliher Township, Beltrami County, Minnesota
- Bullhead Lake (Otter Tail County, Minnesota)
- Bullhead Lake (Watonwan County, Minnesota)
- Bullhead Lake (Roberts County, South Dakota)
- Lake Louise (Roaring Gap, North Carolina), formerly known as Bullhead Lake
