= Walworth Township, Becker County, Minnesota =

Walworth Township, Minnesota
- Township
- Location of Walworth Township, within Becker County, Minnesota

- Location within the state of Minnesota Walworth Township, Minnesota (the United States)
- Coordinates: 47°7′12″N 96°8′28″W
- Country: United States
- State: Minnesota
- County: Becker

Area
  - Total: 36.3 sq mi (93.9 km^{2})
  - Land: 36.1 sq mi (93.6 km^{2})
  - Water: 0.12 sq mi (0.3 km^{2})
- Elevation: 1,198 ft (365 m)

Population (2020)
  - Total: 101
  - Density: 2.79/sq mi (1.08/km^{2})
- Time zone: UTC-6 (Central (CST))
  - Summer (DST): UTC-5 (CDT)
- FIPS code: 27-67954
- GNIS feature ID: 0665908

Walworth Township is a township in Becker County, Minnesota, United States. The population was 101 at the 2020 census, and 158 as of the 2023 American Community Survey.

== History ==
Walworth Township was organized in 1883. It was named after Walworth County, Wisconsin.

== Geography ==
According to the United States Census Bureau, the township has a total area of 36.3 square miles (93.9 km^{2}), of which 36.1 square miles (93.6 km^{2}) is land and 0.1 square miles (0.3 km^{2}) (0.36%) is water.

=== Adjacent townships ===
- Flom Township, Norman County (north)
- Popple Grove Township, Mahnomen County (northeast)
- Spring Creek Township (east)
- Riceville Township (southeast)
- Atlanta Township (south)
- Goose Prairie Township, Clay County (southwest)
- Ulen Township, Clay County (west)
- Home Lake Township, Norman County (northwest)

=== Cemeteries ===
The township contains Walworth Baptist Cemetery.

== Demographics ==
At the 2020 census, there were 101 people, 43 households and 30 families residing in the township. The population density was 0.41 per square mile (1.077/km^{2}). There were 50 housing units at an average density of 1.2/sq mi (0.4/km^{2}). The racial makeup of the township was 86.1% White, 4% Asian, and 1.35% from two or more races.

There were 43 households, of which 31.6% had children under the age of 18 living with them, 57.9% were married couples living together, 5.3% had a female householder with no husband present, and 28.9% were non-families. 26.3% of all households were made up of individuals, and 21.8% had someone living alone who was 65 years of age or older. The average household size was 2.32 and the average family size was 2.78.

32.2% of the population were under the age of 18, 5.7% from 18 to 24, 19.3% from 25 to 44, 27.3% from 45 to 64, and 21.8% who were 65 years of age or older. The median age was 50 years. For every 100 females, there were 125.6 males. The gender ratio is 46:41, with there being more females than males.

The median household income was $34,167 and the median family income was $44,375. Males had a median income of $15,625 and females $15,417. The per capita income was $18,440. None of the population and none of the families were below the poverty line.
