= Lake View Township, Becker County, Minnesota =

Coordinates: 46°45′23″N 95°51′32″W

Lake View Township, Minnesota
- Township
- Location of Lake View Township, within Becker County, Minnesota

- Location within the state of Minnesota Lake View Township, Minnesota (the United States)
- Country: United States
- State: Minnesota
- County: Becker

Area
  - Total: 28.69 sq mi (74.3 km^{2})
  - Land: 20.83 sq mi (53.9 km^{2})
  - Water: 7.86 sq mi (20.4 km^{2})

Population (2020)
  - Total: 1,783
  - Density: 85.60/sq mi (33.05/km^{2})
- Time zone: UTC-6 (Central (CST))
  - Summer (DST): UTC-5 (CDT)
- Area code: 218

Lake View Township is a township in Becker County, Minnesota, United States. The population was 1,783 at the 2020 census.

== History ==
Lake View Township was organized in 1872, and named from their scenic views over the many lakes the township contains.

== Geography ==
According to the United States Census Bureau, the township has a total area of 29.2 square miles (75.5 km^{2}), of which 21.3 square miles (55.1 km^{2}) is land and 7.9 square miles (20.4 km^{2}), or 27.00%, is water.

The southern half of the city of Detroit Lakes is within this township geographically but is a separate entity.

=== Major highways ===
- U.S. Route 59
- Minnesota State Highway 34

=== Lakes ===
- Abbey Lake
- Buck Lake (east half)
- Cottage Lake
- Curfman Lake (south half)
- Fox Lake
- Glawe Lake
- Johnson Lake
- Lind Lake
- Lake Melissa
- Lake Sallie
- Long Lake (south edge)
- Meadow Lake
- Mill Lake
- Monson Lake
- Mud Lake
- Muscrat Lake
- Muskrat Lake
- Nottage Lake
- Reeves Lake
- Sauers Lake
- Senical Lake
- Slough Lake
- St Clair Lake (south three-quarters)

=== Adjacent townships ===
- Detroit Township (north)
- Erie Township (northeast)
- Burlington Township (east)
- Hobart Township, Otter Tail County (southeast)
- Candor Township, Otter Tail County (south)
- Dunn Township, Otter Tail County (southwest)
- Lake Eunice Township (west)
- Audubon Township (northwest)

=== Cemeteries ===
The township contains Lakeview Cemetery.

== Demographics ==
At the 2000 census, there were 1,730 people, 662 households and 505 families residing in the township. The population density was 79.9 inhabitants per square mile (30.8/km^{2}). There were 1,246 housing units at an average density of 57.6 per square mile (22.2/km^{2}). The racial makeup of the township was 95.66% White, 0.17% African American, 1.16% Native American, 0.29% Asian, 0.06% from other races, and 2.66% from two or more races. Hispanic or Latino of any race were 0.58% of the population.

There were 662 households, of which 34.4% had children under the age of 18 living with them, 68.3% were married couples living together, 4.7% had a female householder with no husband present, and 23.6% were non-families. 19.8% of all households were made up of individuals, and 8.0% had someone living alone who was 65 years of age or older. The average household size was 2.61 and the average family size was 3.00.

27.0% of the population were under the age of 18, 5.5% from 18 to 24, 25.8% from 25 to 44, 28.6% from 45 to 64, and 13.1% who were 65 years of age or older. The median age was 40 years. For every 100 females, there were 105.5 males. For every 100 females age 18 and over, there were 104.0 males.

The median household income was $44,125 and the median family income was $49,063. Males had a median income of $35,625 versus $23,125 for females. The per capita income was $20,025. About 7.7% of families and 10.0% of the population were below the poverty line, including 11.2% of those under age 18 and 11.3% of those age 65 or over.
