= Spring Creek Township, Becker County, Minnesota =

Spring Creek Township, Minnesota
- Township
- Location of Spring Creek Township, within Becker County, Minnesota

- Location within the state of Minnesota Spring Creek Township, Minnesota (the United States)
- Coordinates: 47°5′45″N 95°59′10″W
- Country: United States
- State: Minnesota
- County: Becker

Area
  - Total: 37.7 sq mi (97.7 km^{2})
  - Land: 37.2 sq mi (96.3 km^{2})
  - Water: 0.54 sq mi (1.4 km^{2})
- Elevation: 1,230 ft (375 m)

Population (2020)
  - Total: 103
  - Density: 2.77/sq mi (1.07/km^{2})
- Time zone: UTC-6 (Central (CST))
  - Summer (DST): UTC-5 (CDT)
- FIPS code: 27-61762
- GNIS feature ID: 0665667

Spring Creek Township is a township in Becker County, Minnesota, United States. The population was 103 as of the 2020 census.

== History ==
Spring Creek Township was organized in 1912. It was named for the many springs contained within its borders.

== Geography ==
According to the United States Census Bureau, the township has a total area of 37.7 square miles (97.7 km^{2}), of which 37.2 square miles (96.3 km^{2}) is land and 0.6 square miles (1.4 km^{2}) (1.46%) is water.

The west edge of the city of Ogema is within this township geographically but is a separate entity.

=== Lakes ===
- Apple Lake
- Baker Lake (vast majority)
- Banana Lake
- Clarence Lake
- Cucumber Lake
- Lemon Lake

=== Adjacent townships ===
- Popple Grove Township, Mahnomen County (north)
- Lake Grove Township, Mahnomen County (northeast)
- White Earth Township (east)
- Callaway Township (southeast)
- Riceville Township (south)
- Atlanta Township (southwest)
- Walworth Township (west)
- Flom Township, Norman County (northwest)

== Demographics ==
As of the census of 2000, there were 120 people, 39 households, and 32 families residing in the township. The population density was 3.2 people per square mile (1.2/km^{2}). There were 40 housing units at an average density of 1.1/sq mi (0.4/km^{2}). The racial makeup of the township was 84.17% White, 8.33% Native American, and 7.50% from two or more races.

There were 39 households, out of which 46.2% had children under the age of 18 living with them, 76.9% were married couples living together, 5.1% had a female householder with no husband present, and 15.4% were non-families. 12.8% of all households were made up of individuals, and 2.6% had someone living alone who was 65 years of age or older. The average household size was 3.08 and the average family size was 3.39.

In the township the population was spread out, with 36.7% under the age of 18, 4.2% from 18 to 24, 20.8% from 25 to 44, 28.3% from 45 to 64, and 10.0% who were 65 years of age or older. The median age was 32 years. For every 100 females, there were 93.5 males. For every 100 females age 18 and over, there were 94.9 males.

The median income for a household in the township was $37,750, and the median income for a family was $38,750. Males had a median income of $22,344 versus $18,125 for females. The per capita income for the township was $17,456. There were 14.8% of families and 11.1% of the population living below the poverty line, including no under eighteens and 30.0% of those over 64.
