= Burlington Township, Becker County, Minnesota =

Burlington Township, Minnesota
- Township
- Location of Burlington Township, within Becker County, Minnesota

- Location within the state of Minnesota Burlington Township, Minnesota (the United States)
- Coordinates: 46°44′24″N 95°44′38″W
- Country: United States
- State: Minnesota
- County: Becker

Area
  - Total: 35.4 sq mi (91.6 km^{2})
  - Land: 33.2 sq mi (86.0 km^{2})
  - Water: 2.1 sq mi (5.5 km^{2})
- Elevation: 1,394 ft (425 m)

Population (2020)
  - Total: 1,657
  - Density: 49.9/sq mi (19.3/km^{2})
- Time zone: UTC-6 (Central (CST))
  - Summer (DST): UTC-5 (CDT)
- FIPS code: 27-08686
- GNIS feature ID: 0663706
- Website: https://www.burlingtontownship.org/

Burlington Township is a township in Becker County, Minnesota, United States. The population was 1,657 as of the 2020 census.

== History ==
Burlington Township was organized in 1872. It was settled by natives of Burlington, Vermont.

== Geography ==
According to the United States Census Bureau, the township has a total area of 35.4 square miles (91.6 km^{2}), of which 33.2 square miles (86.0 km^{2}) is land and 2.1 square miles (5.5 km^{2}), or 6.06%, is water.

The city of Frazee is entirely within this township geographically but is a separate entity.

=== Major highways ===
- U.S. Route 10
- Minnesota State Highway 87

=== Lakes ===
- Acorn Lake
- Albertson Lake (northwest three-quarters)
- Boot Lake
- Brink Lake
- Chilton Lake
- Eagle Lake
- Elbow Lake
- Fischer Lake (vast majority)
- Gebo Lake
- Graham Lake
- Pearce Lake
- Pierce Lake
- Six Lake
- Stilke Lake
- Town Lake (vast majority)
- Triglaff Lake
- Youman Lake

=== Adjacent townships ===
- Erie Township (north)
- Height of Land Township (northeast)
- Silver Leaf Township (east)
- Gorman Township, Otter Tail County (southeast)
- Hobart Township, Otter Tail County (south)
- Candor Township, Otter Tail County (southwest)
- Lake View Township (west)
- Detroit Township (northwest)

=== Cemeteries ===
The township contains these three cemeteries: Chilton, Lakeside and Sacred Heart.

== Demographics ==
As of the census of 2000, there were 1,304 people, 463 households, and 365 families residing in the township. The population density was 39.1 inhabitants per square mile (15.1/km^{2}). There were 524 housing units at an average density of 15.7 per square mile (6.1/km^{2}). The racial makeup of the township was 97.55% White, 0.08% African American, 1.00% Native American, 0.54% Asian, 0.08% from other races, and 0.77% from two or more races. Hispanic or Latino of any race were 0.31% of the population.

There were 463 households, out of which 38.0% had children under the age of 18 living with them, 70.2% were married couples living together, 5.0% had a female householder with no husband present, and 21.0% were non-families. 18.6% of all households were made up of individuals, and 7.3% had someone living alone who was 65 years of age or older. The average household size was 2.75 and the average family size was 3.13.

In the township the population was spread out, with 28.5% under the age of 18, 6.4% from 18 to 24, 28.8% from 25 to 44, 25.5% from 45 to 64, and 10.8% who were 65 years of age or older. The median age was 38 years. For every 100 females, there were 106.7 males. For every 100 females age 18 and over, there were 107.3 males.

The median income for a household in the township was $43,295, and the median income for a family was $48,158. Males had a median income of $32,596 versus $21,316 for females. The per capita income for the township was $17,003. About 5.6% of families and 7.7% of the population were below the poverty line, including 10.1% of those under age 18 and 9.2% of those age 65 or over.
