= Minnesota State Highway 113 =

State highway in Minnesota, United States

Trunk Highway 113
- MN 113 highlighted in red

Route information
- Maintained by MnDOT
- Length: 54.592 mi (87.857 km)
- Existed: April 22, 1933–present

Major junctions
- West end: MN 32 at Syre
- US 59 at Waubun
- East end: US 71 at Clover Township

Location
- Country: United States
- State: Minnesota
- Counties: Norman, Mahnomen, Becker, Clearwater, Hubbard

Highway system
- Minnesota Trunk Highway System; Interstate; US; State; Legislative; Scenic
← MN 112	→ MN 114

Minnesota State Highway 113 (MN 113) is a 54.592-mile-long (87.857 km) highway in northwest Minnesota, which runs from its intersection with State Highway 32 in Syre and continues east to its eastern terminus at its intersection with U.S. Highway 71 in Clover Township (17 miles north of the city of Park Rapids).

== Route description ==
Highway 113 serves as an east–west route in northwest Minnesota between Syre, the White Earth Indian Reservation, Waubun, and Clover Township.

The route intersects U.S. Highway 59 in Waubun.

The route passes through Clearwater County briefly twice in southern La Prairie Township.

The route passes through the White Earth State Forest in southeast Mahnomen County and northeast Becker County.

Highway 113 parallels State Highway 34 and State Highway 200 throughout its route.

The western terminus of Highway 113 is located in the Red River Valley region of Minnesota.

The eastern terminus of the route is located immediately south of Lake Itasca.

Highway 113 serves as the southern border for Itasca State Park. The two park entrances are located on nearby Highways 71 (east entrance) and 200 (north entrance).

The route is legally defined as Routes 200 and 283 in the Minnesota Statutes. It is not marked with these numbers.

== History ==
The section of Highway 113 between U.S. 59 at Waubun and U.S. 71 at Clover Township was authorized on April 22, 1933.

The section of the route between U.S. 59 at Waubun and State Highway 32 at Syre was authorized in 1949.

Only a small portion of the route, east of Waubun, had been paved by 1953. The entire route was paved by the late 1960s.

== Major intersections ==
County	Location	mi	km	Destinations	Notes
Norman	Syre	0.000	0.000	MN 32 – Ulen, Twin Valley CSAH 39 west	Western terminus; roadway continues west as CSAH 39
Norman	Flom Township	6.042	9.724	CSAH 38 – Flom	
Mahnomen	Popple Grove Township	10.313	16.597	CSAH 10 north	
Mahnomen	Waubun	15.327	24.666	US 59 – Mahnomen, Detroit Lakes	
Mahnomen	Oakland Township	22.384	36.024	CSAH 3 north	
Mahnomen	Oakland Township	27.150	43.694	CSAH 4 north – Nay Tah Waush	
Becker	Eagle View Township	33.802	54.399	CSAH 35 south (W Elbow Lake Road)	
Clearwater	No major junctions				
Becker	Forest Township	41.051	66.065	CSAH 37 south (W Bad Medicine Lake Road)	
Hubbard	Clover Township	54.676	87.992	US 71 – Itasca State Park, Bemidji, Park Rapids	Eastern terminus
1.000 mi = 1.609 km; 1.000 km = 0.621 mi
