= Lake Eunice Township, Becker County, Minnesota =

Lake Eunice Township, Minnesota
- Township
- Location of Lake Eunice Township, within Becker County, Minnesota

- Location within the state of Minnesota Lake Eunice Township, Minnesota (the United States)
- Coordinates: 46°45′50″N 95°58′41″W
- Country: United States
- State: Minnesota
- County: Becker

Area
  - Total: 36.0 sq mi (93.3 km^{2})
  - Land: 30.0 sq mi (77.6 km^{2})
  - Water: 6.0 sq mi (15.6 km^{2})
- Elevation: 1,339 ft (408 m)

Population (2020)
  - Total: 1,729
  - Density: 57.7/sq mi (22.3/km^{2})
- Time zone: UTC-6 (Central (CST))
  - Summer (DST): UTC-5 (CDT)
- FIPS code: 27-34298
- GNIS feature ID: 0664672
- Website: lakeeunicetownship.org

Lake Eunice Township is a township in Becker County, Minnesota, United States. The population was 1,729 as of the 2020 census.

Lake Eunice Township was organized in 1870.

== Geography ==
According to the United States Census Bureau, the township has a total area of 36.0 square miles (93.3 km^{2}), of which 30.0 square miles (77.6 km^{2}) is land and 6.0 square miles (15.6 km^{2}), or 16.78%, is water.

=== Lakes ===
- Arrow Lake
- Bass Lake
- Big Cormorant Lake (east quarter)
- Buck Lake (west half)
- Bullhead Lake
- Carlston Lake
- Dahlberg Lake (southeast quarter)
- Dart Lake
- Dorff Lake
- Fish Lake
- Fog Lake
- Holstad Lake
- Hunt Lake
- Leaf Lake (southeast three-quarters)
- Little Cormorant Lake (south edge)
- Little Cormorant Lake (southeast half)
- Little Pearl Lake
- Lake Ellison
- Lake Eunice
- Lake Maud
- Loon Lake
- Moe Lake
- Mud Lake
- Pearl Lake
- Rider Lake
- Samson Lake
- Spear Lake

=== Adjacent townships ===
- Audubon Township (north)
- Detroit Township (northeast)
- Lake View Township (east)
- Candor Township, Otter Tail County (southeast)
- Dunn Township, Otter Tail County (south)
- Scambler Township, Otter Tail County (southwest)
- Cormorant Township (west)
- Lake Park Township (northwest)

=== Cemeteries ===
The township contains these six cemeteries: Augustana Lutheran, Elmwood, Lake Eunice, Lake Eunice Evangelical Free, Saint Mary of the Lakes and Saint Peter's.

== Demographics ==
As of the census of 2000, there were 1,198 people, 506 households, and 364 families residing in the township. The population density was 39.9 inhabitants per square mile (15.4/km^{2}). There were 1,165 housing units at an average density of 38.8 per square mile (15.0/km^{2}). The racial makeup of the township was 96.74% White, 1.09% Native American, 0.08% Asian, 0.08% Pacific Islander, and 2.00% from two or more races. Hispanic or Latino of any race were 1.09% of the population.

There were 506 households, out of which 28.9% had children under the age of 18 living with them, 63.8% were married couples living together, 4.3% had a female householder with no husband present, and 27.9% were non-families. 23.1% of all households were made up of individuals, and 7.1% had someone living alone who was 65 years of age or older. The average household size was 2.37 and the average family size was 2.79.

In the township the population was spread out, with 23.0% under the age of 18, 5.5% from 18 to 24, 26.2% from 25 to 44, 31.1% from 45 to 64, and 14.2% who were 65 years of age or older. The median age was 42 years. For every 100 females, there were 116.6 males. For every 100 females age 18 and over, there were 110.5 males.

The median income for a household in the township was $34,688, and the median income for a family was $43,393. Males had a median income of $30,735 versus $19,850 for females. The per capita income for the township was $18,756. About 8.5% of families and 11.2% of the population were below the poverty line, including 14.9% of those under age 18 and 6.7% of those age 65 or over.
