= Silver Leaf Township, Becker County, Minnesota =

Silver Leaf Township, Minnesota
- Township
- Location of Silver Leaf Township, within Becker County, Minnesota

- Location within the state of Minnesota Silver Leaf Township, Minnesota (the United States)
- Coordinates: 46°44′1″N 95°36′11″W
- Country: United States
- State: Minnesota
- County: Becker

Area
  - Total: 36.2 sq mi (93.8 km^{2})
  - Land: 35.0 sq mi (90.7 km^{2})
  - Water: 1.2 sq mi (3.1 km^{2})
- Elevation: 1,473 ft (449 m)

Population (2020)
  - Total: 512
  - Density: 14.6/sq mi (5.64/km^{2})
- Time zone: UTC-6 (Central (CST))
  - Summer (DST): UTC-5 (CDT)
- ZIP code: 56544
- Area code: 218
- FIPS code: 27-60430
- GNIS feature ID: 0665617

Silver Leaf Township is a township in Becker County, Minnesota. The population was 512 as of the 2020 census.

== History ==
Silver Leaf Township was organized in 1888. It was named for the silver-colored leaves of poplar trees.

== Geography ==
According to the United States Census Bureau, the township has a total area of 36.2 square miles (93.8 km^{2}), of which 35.0 square miles (90.7 km^{2}) is land and 1.2 square miles (3.1 km^{2}) (3.26%) is water.

=== Major highway ===
- Minnesota State Highway 87

=== Lakes ===
- Dead Lake
- Fischer Lake (east edge)
- Hungry Lake
- Lizzy Lake
- Mud Lake
- Murphey Lake
- Rice Lake
- Stein Lake

=== Adjacent townships ===
- Height of Land Township (north)
- Toad Lake Township (northeast)
- Evergreen Township (east)
- Corliss Township, Otter Tail County (southeast)
- Gorman Township, Otter Tail County (south)
- Hobart Township, Otter Tail County (southwest)
- Burlington Township (west)
- Erie Township (northwest)

=== Cemeteries ===
The township contains Dretsch Family Memorial Cemetery.

== Demographics ==
As of the census of 2000, there were 493 people, 171 households, and 136 families residing in the township. The population density was 14.1 people per square mile (5.4/km^{2}). There were 190 housing units at an average density of 5.4/sq mi (2.1/km^{2}). The racial makeup of the township was 98.78% White, 0.20% from other races, and 1.01% from two or more races. Hispanic or Latino of any race were 0.20% of the population.

There were 171 households, out of which 38.0% had children under the age of 18 living with them, 73.1% were married couples living together, 4.7% had a female householder with no husband present, and 19.9% were non-families. 16.4% of all households were made up of individuals, and 8.8% had someone living alone who was 65 years of age or older. The average household size was 2.88 and the average family size was 3.28.

In the township the population was spread out, with 30.4% under the age of 18, 9.1% from 18 to 24, 23.3% from 25 to 44, 26.8% from 45 to 64, and 10.3% who were 65 years of age or older. The median age was 37 years. For every 100 females, there were 104.6 males. For every 100 females age 18 and over, there were 110.4 males.

The median income for a household in the township was $36,458, and the median income for a family was $39,896. Males had a median income of $24,886 versus $18,500 for females. The per capita income for the township was $13,905. About 6.5% of families and 5.8% of the population were below the poverty line, including 2.8% of those under age 18 and 8.1% of those age 65 or over.
