= White Earth Township, Becker County, Minnesota =

White Earth Township, Minnesota
- Township
- Location of White Earth Township, within Becker County, Minnesota

- Location within the state of Minnesota White Earth Township, Minnesota (the United States)
- Coordinates: 47°5′54″N 95°51′20″W
- Country: United States
- State: Minnesota
- County: Becker

Area
  - Total: 34.9 sq mi (90.3 km^{2})
  - Land: 32.2 sq mi (83.5 km^{2})
  - Water: 2.6 sq mi (6.7 km^{2})
- Elevation: 1,407 ft (429 m)

Population (2020)
  - Total: 765
  - Density: 23.7/sq mi (9.16/km^{2})
- Time zone: UTC-6 (Central (CST))
  - Summer (DST): UTC-5 (CDT)
- ZIP code: 56591
- Area code: 218
- FIPS code: 27-70024
- GNIS feature ID: 0665985

White Earth Township is a township in Becker County, Minnesota, United States. The population was 765 at the 2020 census.

== History ==
White Earth Township was organized in 1906. It took its name from the community of White Earth.

== Geography ==
According to the United States Census Bureau, the township has a total area of 34.8 square miles (90.3 km^{2}), of which 32.2 square miles (83.5 km^{2}) is land and 2.6 square miles (6.7 km^{2}) (7.46%) is water.

The city of Ogema is entirely within this township geographically but is a separate entity.

=== Cities, towns, villages ===
- White Earth

=== Major highway ===
- U.S. Route 59

=== Lakes ===
- Birch Lake (northwest half)
- Brown Lake
- Brown Lake (west three-quarters)
- Casebeer Lake (vast majority)
- Du Forte Lake
- Dump Ground Lake (east three-quarters)
- Fish Lake
- Gay Bow Lake
- Johnson Lake
- Lettuce Lake
- Mc Kenzi Lake
- Mission Lake
- Morrison Lake
- Ogema Lake (east three-quarters)
- Onion Lake
- Otto Lake
- Radish Lake
- Rat Farm Lake
- Sand Lake
- Spinich Lake
- Spirit Lake
- Vegetable Lake

=== Adjacent townships ===
- Lake Grove Township, Mahnomen County (north)
- Oakland Township, Mahnomen County (northeast)
- Maple Grove Township (east)
- Sugar Bush Township (southeast)
- Callaway Township (south)
- Riceville Township (southwest)
- Spring Creek Township (west)
- Popple Grove Township, Mahnomen County (northwest)

=== Cemeteries ===
The township contains these three cemeteries: Calvary, Most Holy Redeemer and Saint Columba's Episcopal Mission.

== Demographics ==
As of the census of 2000, there were 799 people, 262 households, and 172 families residing in the township. The population density was 24.8 people per square mile (9.6/km^{2}). There were 276 housing units at an average density of 8.6/sq mi (3.3/km^{2}). The racial makeup of the township was 22.90% White, 68.84% Native American, 0.13% from other races, and 8.14% from two or more races. Hispanic or Latino of any race were 1.63% of the population.

There were 262 households, out of which 43.1% had children under the age of 18 living with them, 32.1% were married couples living together, 22.1% had a female householder with no husband present, and 34.0% were non-families. 29.8% of all households were made up of individuals, and 11.1% had someone living alone who was 65 years of age or older. The average household size was 3.05 and the average family size was 3.83.

In the township the population was spread out, with 41.8% under the age of 18, 9.9% from 18 to 24, 21.5% from 25 to 44, 19.3% from 45 to 64, and 7.5% who were 65 years of age or older. The median age was 24 years. For every 100 females, there were 105.4 males. For every 100 females age 18 and over, there were 103.9 males.

The median income for a household in the township was $21,094, and the median income for a family was $28,000. Males had a median income of $24,750 versus $20,469 for females. The per capita income for the township was $10,225. About 25.3% of families and 32.8% of the population were below the poverty line, including 41.4% of those under age 18 and 23.8% of those age 65 or over.
