= Minnesota State Highway 228 =

State highway in Minnesota, United States

Trunk Highway 228
- MN 228 highlighted in red

Route information
- Maintained by MnDOT
- Length: 7.785 mi (12.529 km)
- Existed: July 1, 1949–July 1, 2015

Major junctions
- West end: CSAH 4 / CSAH 17 at Vergas
- East end: US 10 at Gorman Township

Location
- Country: United States
- State: Minnesota
- Counties: Otter Tail

Highway system
- Minnesota Trunk Highway System; Interstate; US; State; Legislative; Scenic
← MN 227	→ MN 232

Minnesota State Highway 228 (MN 228) was a 7.785-mile-long (12.529 km) highway in west-central Minnesota, which ran from its intersection with Otter Tail County Roads 4 and 17 in Vergas and continued east to its eastern terminus at its intersection with U.S. Highway 10 in the unincorporated town of Luce in Gorman Township.

MN 228 passed through the communities of Vergas, Hobart Township, and Gorman Township.

== Route description ==
Highway 228 served as an east–west connector route in west-central Minnesota between U.S. Highway 10 at Gorman Township and the town of Vergas.

Highway 228 was also known as Main Street and Frazee Avenue in Vergas.

The route passed around the west side of Long Lake in Vergas.

The route was legally defined as Route 227 in the Minnesota Statutes.

== History ==
Highway 228 was authorized on July 1, 1949. The route was paved in 1954 or 1955. Highway 228 has been decommissioned 66 years later on July 1, 2015, by MnDOT and has been turned over to Otter Tail County as an extension of Otter Tail County Roads 4 and 60.

== Major intersections ==
The entire route was in Otter Tail County.

Location	mi	km	Destinations	Notes
Vergas	0.000	0.000	CSAH 4 south / CSAH 17 north (1st Avenue)	
Vergas	0.680	1.094	CSAH 4 (E. Frazee Road)	
Hobart Township	5.366	8.636	CSAH 36	
Gorman Township	7.785	12.529	US 10 / CSAH 60 east	
1.000 mi = 1.609 km; 1.000 km = 0.621 mi
