= Waubun, Minnesota =

City in Minnesota, United States

Waubun, Minnesota Waabanong (Ojibwe)
- City
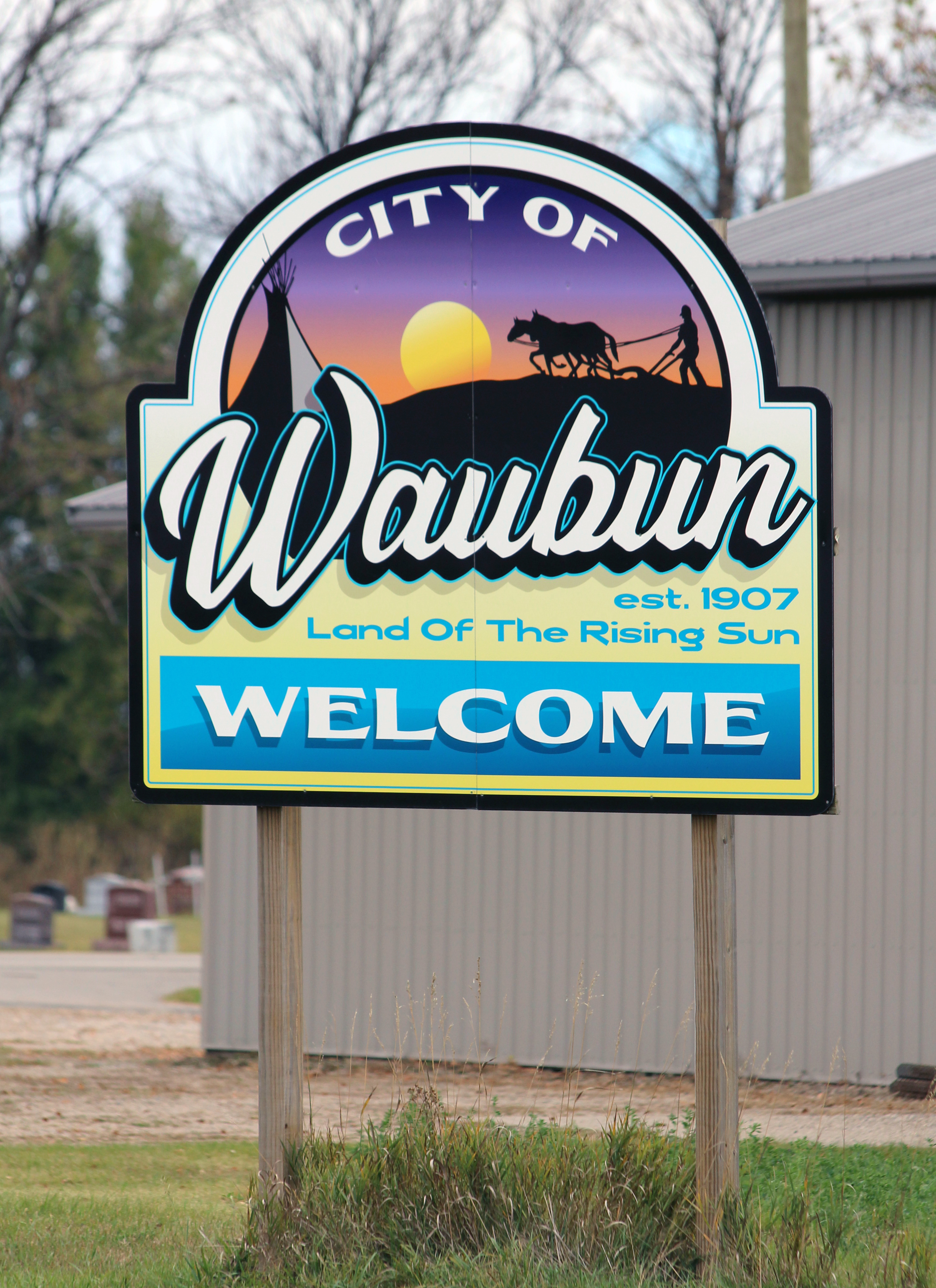
- Welcome sign

- Location in Mahnomen County and the state of Minnesota
- Coordinates: 47°11′02″N 95°56′24″W
- Country: United States
- State: Minnesota
- County: Mahnomen

Area
  - Total: 0.51 sq mi (1.33 km^{2})
  - Land: 0.51 sq mi (1.33 km^{2})
  - Water: 0 sq mi (0.00 km^{2})
- Elevation: 1,240 ft (380 m)

Population (2020)
  - Total: 409
  - Density: 795.3/sq mi (307.05/km^{2})
- Time zone: UTC-6 (Central (CST))
  - Summer (DST): UTC-5 (CDT)
- ZIP Code: 56589
- Area code: 218
- FIPS code: 27-68674
- GNIS feature ID: 2397219
- Website: https://sites.google.com/waubun.k12.mn.us/cityofwaubun/home

Waubun (Ojibwe: Waabanong) is a city in Mahnomen County, Minnesota, United States. The population was 409 at the 2020 census.

U.S. Route 59 and Minnesota State Highway 113 are two of the main routes in the community.

== History ==
The city was incorporated as a village on December 18, 1907. When the Soo Line was built through the county in 1903–4, the general manager, Pennington, and his chief engineer, Thomas Green, named the stations as they moved the line north; all towns on the White Earth Indian Reservation had to have Ojibwe Native American names. The community post office was established in 1905 as Bement and changed to Waubun in 1906. The name "Waubun" comes from the Ojibwe word for "the east", "the morning", "the twilight of dawn", and "dawn of day".

== Geography ==
Waubun is in southwestern Mahnomen County on the west side of U.S. Route 59, which leads north 10 miles (16 km) to Mahnomen, the county seat, and south 5 miles (8 km) to Ogema. State Highway 113 runs along the community's south side, leading east 20 miles (32 km) to Elbow Lake and west 15 miles (24 km) to its terminus at Syre.

According to the U.S. Census Bureau, Waubun has an area of 0.51 square miles (1.32 km^{2}), all of it land.

The city is in the western part of the White Earth Indian Reservation, which includes all of Mahnomen County and parts of neighboring counties to the east and south.

== Demographics ==
Historical population
Census	Pop.	Note	%±
1910	230		—
1920	346		50.4%
1930	337		−2.6%
1940	438		30.0%
1950	426		−2.7%
1960	350		−17.8%
1970	345		−1.4%
1980	390		13.0%
1990	330		−15.4%
2000	403		22.1%
2010	400		−0.7%
2020	409		2.3%
U.S. Decennial Census

=== 2010 census ===
As of the census of 2010, there were 400 people, 160 households, and 108 families residing in the city. The population density was 784.3 inhabitants per square mile (302.8/km^{2}). There were 182 housing units at an average density of 356.9 per square mile (137.8/km^{2}). The racial makeup of the city was 46.0% White, 0.3% African American, 33.3% Native American, 0.3% Asian, and 20.3% from two or more races. Hispanic or Latino of any race were 2.0% of the population.

There were 160 households, of which 36.3% had children under the age of 18 living with them, 36.9% were married couples living together, 23.1% had a female householder with no husband present, 7.5% had a male householder with no wife present, and 32.5% were non-families. 28.1% of all households were made up of individuals, and 17.5% had someone living alone who was 65 years of age or older. The average household size was 2.50 and the average family size was 2.96.

The median age in the city was 33.7 years. 31.7% of residents were under the age of 18; 8.2% were between the ages of 18 and 24; 21.2% were from 25 to 44; 21.6% were from 45 to 64; and 17.8% were 65 years of age or older. The gender makeup of the city was 43.0% male and 57.0% female.

=== 2000 census ===
As of the census of 2000, there were 403 people, 179 households, and 100 families residing in the city. The population density was 788.2 inhabitants per square mile (304.3/km^{2}). There were 183 housing units at an average density of 357.9 per square mile (138.2/km^{2}). The racial makeup of the city was 66.75% White, 17.12% Native American, and 16.13% from two or more races. Hispanic or Latino of any race were 0.25% of the population (1 person).

There were 179 households, out of which 26.3% had children under the age of 18 living with them, 39.7% were married couples living together, 14.5% had a female householder with no husband present, and 44.1% were non-families. 38.5% of all households were made up of individuals, and 25.7% had someone living alone who was 65 years of age or older. The average household size was 2.25 and the average family size was 3.00.

In the city, the population was spread out, with 26.6% under the age of 18, 5.7% from 18 to 24, 20.3% from 25 to 44, 25.8% from 45 to 64, and 21.6% who were 65 years of age or older. The median age was 42 years. For every 100 females, there were 93.8 males. For every 100 females age 18 and over, there were 88.5 males.

The median income for a household in the city was $31,042, and the median income for a family was $35,625. Males had a median income of $23,906 versus $22,292 for females. The per capita income for the city was $14,968. About 2.8% of families and 11.4% of the population were below the poverty line, including 7.0% of those under age 18 and 23.7% of those age 65 or over.

== Gallery ==
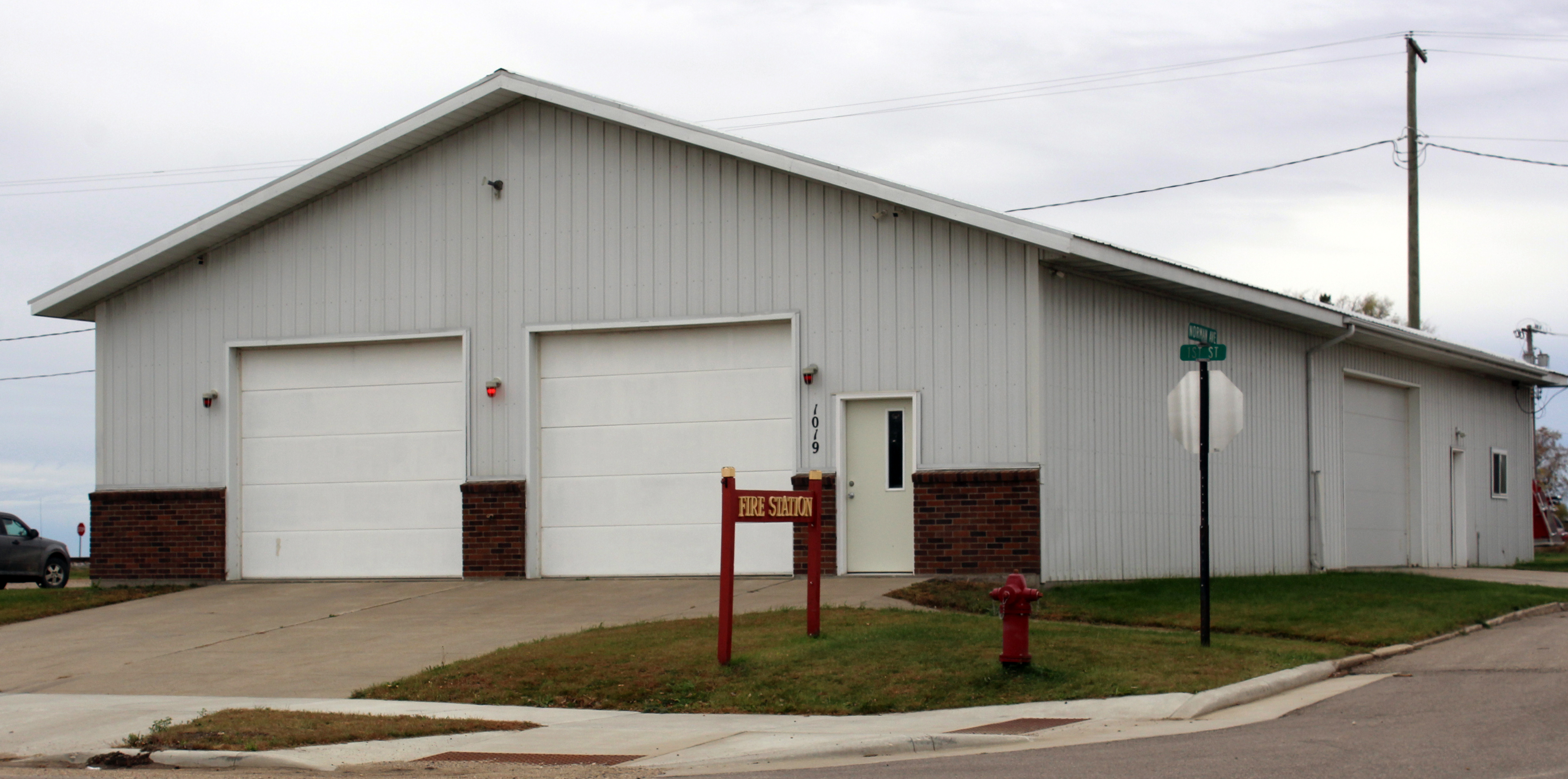
Fire station

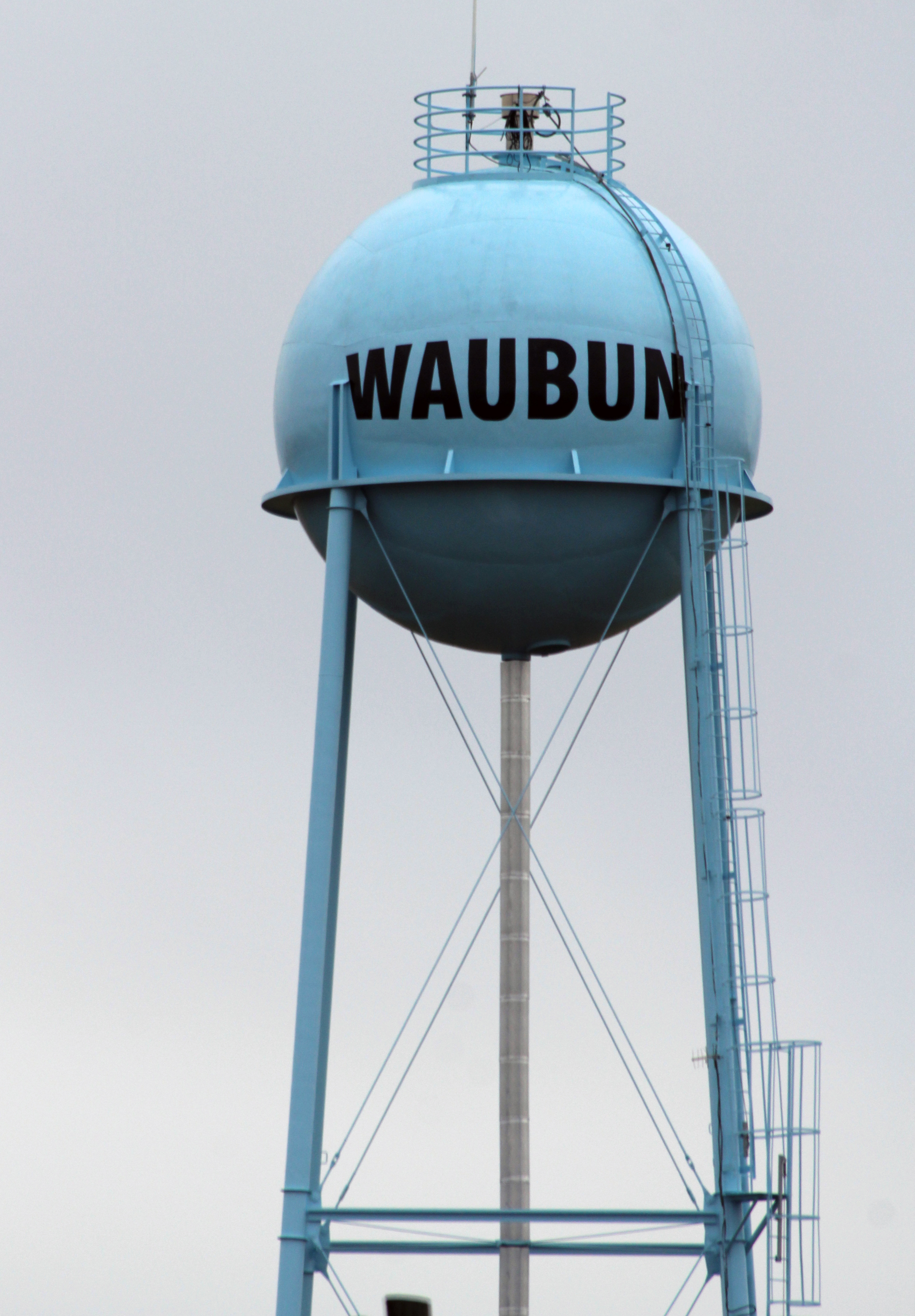
Water tower

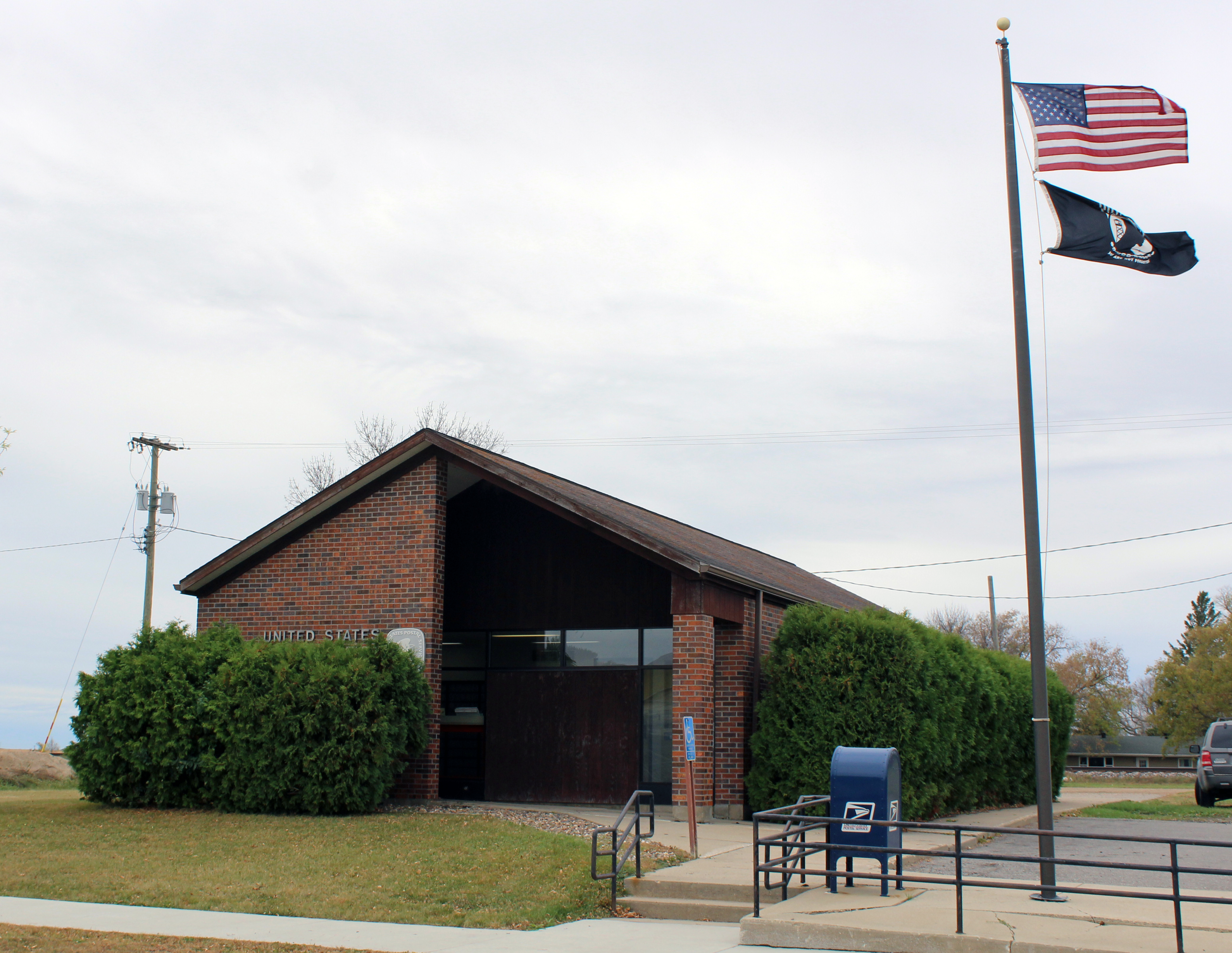
United States Post Office

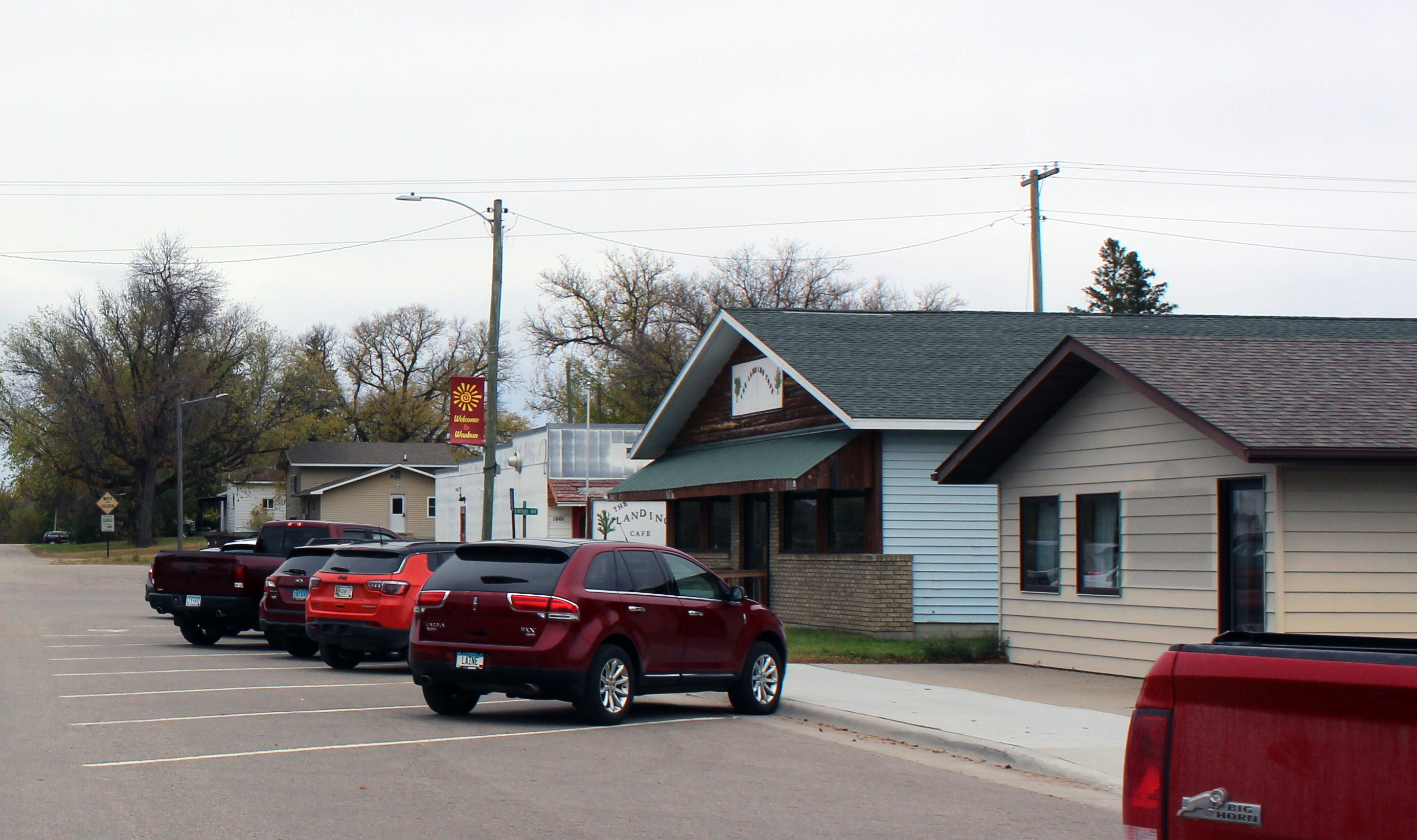
Businesses on First Street

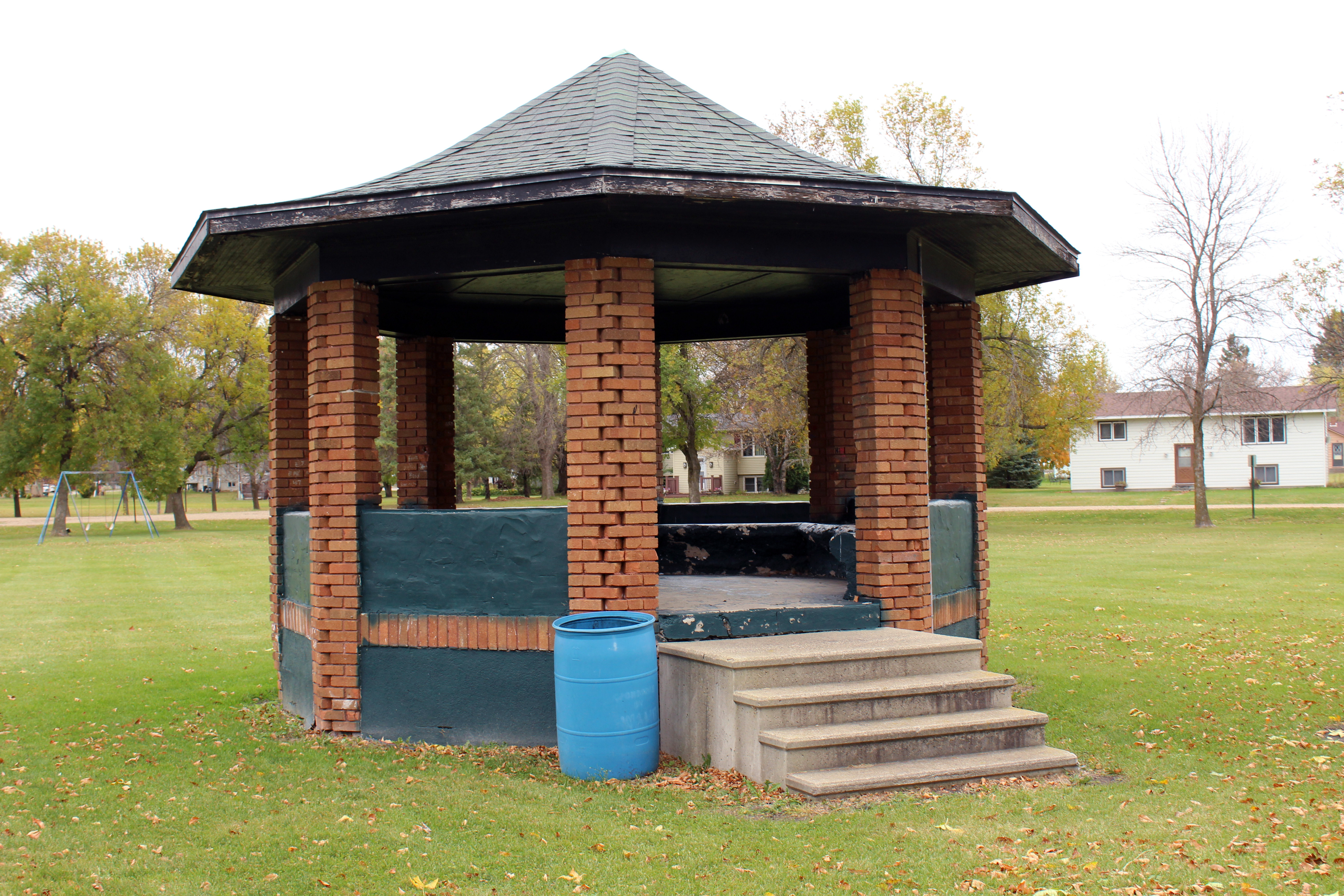
Bandstand
