= Audubon Township, Becker County, Minnesota =

Audubon Township, Minnesota
- Township
- Location of Audubon Township, within Becker County, Minnesota

- Location within the state of Minnesota Audubon Township, Minnesota (the United States)
- Coordinates: 46°51′1″N 95°59′39″W
- Country: United States
- State: Minnesota
- County: Becker

Area
  - Total: 35.4 sq mi (91.7 km^{2})
  - Land: 32.4 sq mi (83.8 km^{2})
  - Water: 3.1 sq mi (7.9 km^{2})
- Elevation: 1,319 ft (402 m)

Population (2020)
  - Total: 646
  - Density: 20.0/sq mi (7.71/km^{2})
- Time zone: UTC-6 (Central (CST))
  - Summer (DST): UTC-5 (CDT)
- ZIP code: 56511
- Area code: 218
- FIPS code: 27-02746
- GNIS feature ID: 0663476

Audubon Township (/ˈɔːdəbən/ AW-də-bən) is a township in Becker County, Minnesota, United States. The population was 646 at the 2020 census.

== History ==
Audubon Township was organized in 1871. It was named after naturalist John James Audubon.

== Geography ==
According to the United States Census Bureau, the township has a total area of 35.4 square miles (92 km^{2}), of which 32.3 square miles (84 km^{2}) is land and 3.0 square miles (7.8 km^{2}) (8.59%) is water.

The city of Audubon is entirely within this township geographically but is a separate entity.

=== Major highway ===
- U.S. Route 10

=== Lakes ===
- Audubon Lake
- Barne Lake
- Barnes Lake
- Berseth Lake
- Bluebird Lake
- Boardson Lake
- Boyer Lake (east quarter)
- Canary Lake
- Cravath Lake (south half)
- Dahlberg Lake (northeast edge)
- Gilbertson Lake
- Joy Lake
- Larson Lake
- Leaf Lake (northeast edge)
- Little Cormorant Lake (vast majority)
- Lake Minnetonka
- Marshall Lake
- Mc Kinstry Lake
- Reep Lake
- Robin Lake

=== Adjacent townships ===
- Hamden Township (north)
- Richwood Township (northeast)
- Detroit Township (east)
- Lake View Township (southeast)
- Lake Eunice Township (south)
- Cormorant Township (southwest)
- Lake Park Township (west)
- Cuba Township (northwest)

=== Cemeteries ===
The township contains these four cemeteries: Audubon, Cook Family, Felker and Immanuel.

== Demographics ==
As of the census of 2000, there were 416 people, 162 households, and 129 families residing in the township. The population density was 12.9 inhabitants per square mile (5.0/km^{2}). There were 224 housing units at an average density of 6.9 per square mile (2.7/km^{2}). The racial makeup of the township was 97.12% White, 0.72% Native American, and 2.16% from two or more races.

There were 162 households, out of which 32.1% had children under the age of 18 living with them, 69.1% were married couples living together, 7.4% had a female householder with no husband present, and 19.8% were non-families. 18.5% of all households were made up of individuals, and 8.0% had someone living alone who was 65 years of age or older. The average household size was 2.57 and the average family size was 2.88.

In the township the population was spread out, with 28.1% under the age of 18, 4.3% from 18 to 24, 25.0% from 25 to 44, 28.1% from 45 to 64, and 14.4% who were 65 years of age or older. The median age was 39 years. For every 100 females, there were 95.3 males. For every 100 females age 18 and over, there were 102.0 males.

The median income for a household in the township was $40,000, and the median income for a family was $46,458. Males had a median income of $25,179 versus $28,750 for females. The per capita income for the township was $20,650. About 4.9% of families and 9.3% of the population were below the poverty line, including 14.9% of those under age 18 and 14.0% of those age 65 or over.
