= Maple Grove Township, Becker County, Minnesota =

Maple Grove Township, Minnesota
- Township
- Location of Maple Grove Township, within Becker County, Minnesota

- Location within the state of Minnesota Maple Grove Township, Minnesota (the United States)
- Coordinates: 47°6′5″N 95°45′39″W
- Country: United States
- State: Minnesota
- County: Becker

Area
  - Total: 35.7 sq mi (92.5 km^{2})
  - Land: 27.7 sq mi (71.7 km^{2})
  - Water: 8.0 sq mi (20.7 km^{2})
- Elevation: 1,460 ft (445 m)

Population (2020)
  - Total: 477
  - Density: 17.2/sq mi (6.65/km^{2})
- Time zone: UTC-6 (Central (CST))
  - Summer (DST): UTC-5 (CDT)
- FIPS code: 27-40130
- GNIS feature ID: 0664899

Maple Grove Township is a township in Becker County, Minnesota, United States. The population was 477 as of the 2020 census.

== Geography ==
According to the United States Census Bureau, the township has a total area of 35.7 square miles (92.5 km^{2}), of which 27.7 square miles (71.7 km^{2}) is land and 8.0 square miles (20.7 km^{2}) (22.40%) is water.

=== Lakes ===
- Bad Boy Lake
- Bass Lake
- Becker Lake
- Big Rat Lake (west edge)
- Birch Lake (east edge)
- Black Earth Lake
- Blueberry Lake
- Bow-Dodge Lake (northeast three-quarters)
- Brown Lake (east quarter)
- Cabin Lake
- Casebeer Lake (east edge)
- Cherry Lake
- Chokecherry Lake
- Fish Hook Lake
- Gooseberry Lake
- Island Lake (northeast half)
- Jack Haw Lake
- Little Bass Lake
- Little Rat Lake (west edge)
- Little Rat Lake (west quarter)
- Mallard Lake (north quarter)
- Net Lake
- Northern Lake
- Pickle Lake
- Pine Lake
- Raspberry Lake (northwest edge)
- Strawberry Lake (northwest three-quarters)
- White Earth Lake

=== Adjacent townships ===
- Oakland Township, Mahnomen County (north)
- Little Elbow Township, Mahnomen County (northeast)
- Eagle View Township (east)
- Sugar Bush Township (southeast)
- Callaway Township (southwest)
- White Earth Township (west)
- Lake Grove Township, Mahnomen County (northwest)

== Demographics ==
As of the census of 2000, there were 405 people, 147 households, and 109 families residing in the township. The population density was 14.6 inhabitants per square mile (5.6/km^{2}). There were 329 housing units at an average density of 11.9 per square mile (4.6/km^{2}). The racial makeup of the township was 38.77% White, 52.35% Native American, and 8.89% from two or more races. Hispanic or Latino of any race were 0.74% of the population.

There were 147 households, out of which 36.7% had children under the age of 18 living with them, 49.0% were married couples living together, 12.9% had a female householder with no husband present, and 25.2% were non-families. 21.1% of all households were made up of individuals, and 7.5% had someone living alone who was 65 years of age or older. The average household size was 2.76 and the average family size was 3.11.

In the township the population was spread out, with 31.1% under the age of 18, 6.4% from 18 to 24, 26.4% from 25 to 44, 24.2% from 45 to 64, and 11.9% who were 65 years of age or older. The median age was 35 years. For every 100 females, there were 104.5 males. For every 100 females age 18 and over, there were 113.0 males.

The median income for a household in the township was $37,667, and the median income for a family was $37,500. Males had a median income of $23,000 versus $24,583 for females. The per capita income for the township was $14,359. About 13.2% of families and 16.2% of the population were below the poverty line, including 25.7% of those under age 18 and 3.6% of those age 65 or over.
