= Lake Park Township, Becker County, Minnesota =

Lake Park Township, Minnesota
- Township
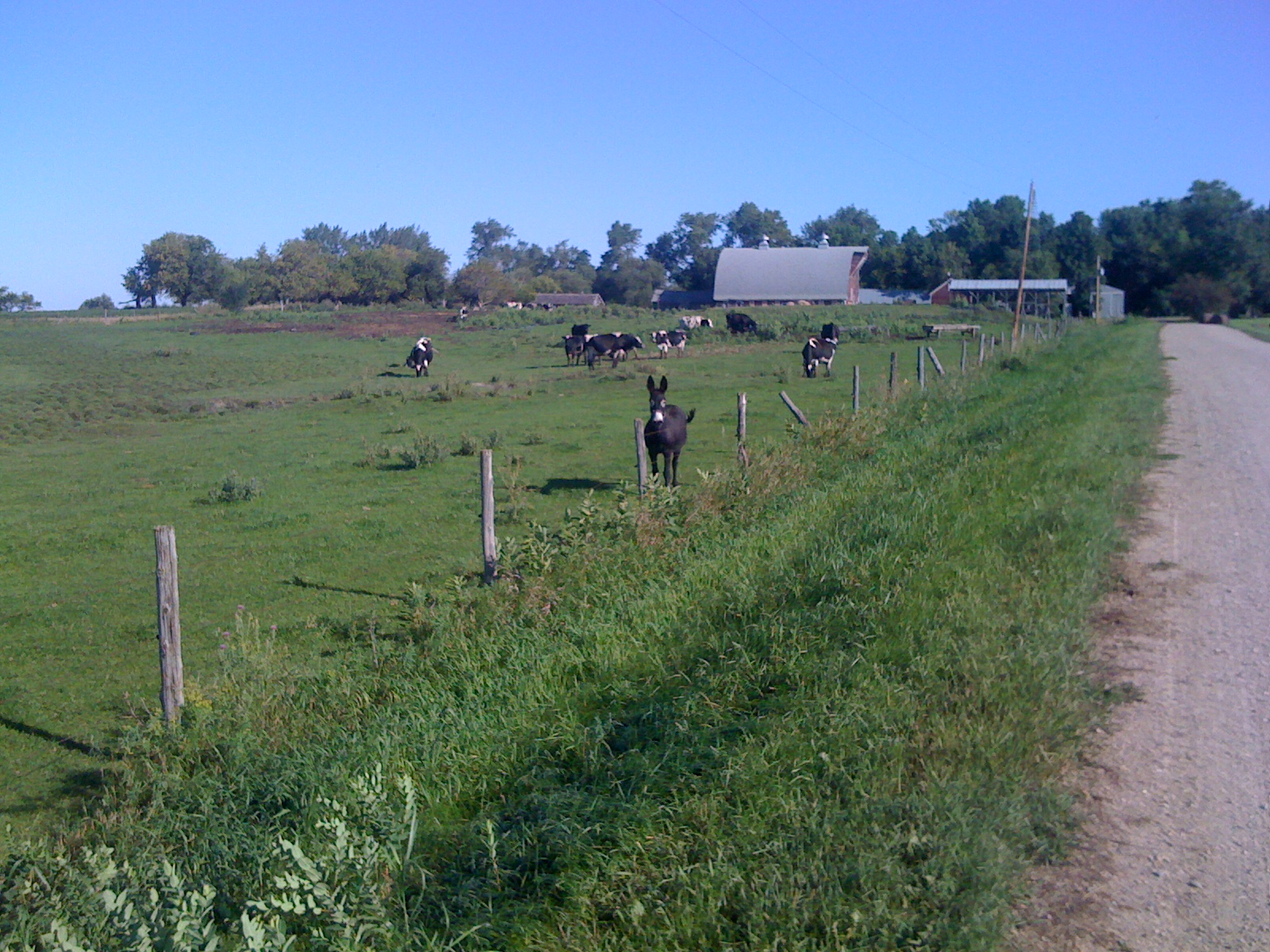
- Outskirts of Lake Park Township

- Location of Lake Park Township, within Becker County, Minnesota

- Location within the state of Minnesota Lake Park Township, Minnesota (the United States)
- Coordinates: 46°51′41″N 96°6′35″W
- Country: United States
- State: Minnesota
- County: Becker

Area
  - Total: 35.0 sq mi (90.7 km^{2})
  - Land: 30.7 sq mi (79.5 km^{2})
  - Water: 4.3 sq mi (11.2 km^{2})
- Elevation: 1,368 ft (417 m)

Population (2020)
  - Total: 549
  - Density: 17.9/sq mi (6.91/km^{2})
- Time zone: UTC-6 (Central (CST))
  - Summer (DST): UTC-5 (CDT)
- ZIP code: 56554
- Area code: 218
- FIPS code: 27-34802
- GNIS feature ID: 0664694

Lake Park Township is a township in Becker County, Minnesota. The population was 549 as of the 2020 census.

Lake Park Township was organized in 1870.

== Geography ==
According to the United States Census Bureau, the township has a total area of 35.0 square miles (91 km^{2}), of which 30.7 square miles (80 km^{2}) is land and 4.3 square miles (11 km^{2}) (12.36%) is water.

The city of Lake Park is entirely within this township geographically but is a separate entity.

=== Major highway ===
- U.S. Route 10

=== Lakes ===
- Anderson Lake
- Axberg Lake
- Bijou Lake
- Boyer Lake (west three-quarters)
- Cuba Lake (southeast three-quarters)
- Dahlberg Lake (northwest half)
- Forget-Me-Not Lake
- Gourd Lake
- Horan Lake
- La Belle Lake (southwest edge)
- Lee Lake
- Lime Lake (southeast three-quarters)
- Little Boyer Lake
- Lake Engebretson
- Olive Lake
- Orange Lake
- Peach Lake
- Pineapple Lake
- Prestrude Lake
- Prune Lake
- Pump Lake
- Round Lake
- Sand Lake
- Shoe Lake
- Sorenson Lake
- Stakke Lake
- Yort Lake

=== Adjacent townships ===
- Cuba Township (north)
- Hamden Township (northeast)
- Audubon Township (east)
- Lake Eunice Township (southeast)
- Cormorant Township (south)
- Parke Township, Clay County (southwest)
- Eglon Township, Clay County (west)
- Highland Grove Township, Clay County (northwest)

=== Cemeteries ===
The township contains these four cemeteries: Eskjo, Houglum, Oak Grove and Strandvik.

== Demographics ==
As of the census of 2000, there were 418 people, 149 households, and 109 families residing in the township. The population density was 13.6 inhabitants per square mile (5.3/km^{2}). There were 188 housing units at an average density of 6.1 per square mile (2.4/km^{2}). The racial makeup of the township was 99.28% White, 0.48% Native American, and 0.24% from two or more races. Hispanic or Latino of any race were 1.20% of the population.

There were 149 households, out of which 28.2% had children under the age of 18 living with them, 65.1% were married couples living together, 4.7% had a female householder with no husband present, and 26.8% were non-families. 23.5% of all households were made up of individuals, and 6.7% had someone living alone who was 65 years of age or older. The average household size was 2.42 and the average family size was 2.86.

In the township the population was spread out, with 18.9% under the age of 18, 4.8% from 18 to 24, 21.5% from 25 to 44, 26.8% from 45 to 64, and 28.0% who were 65 years of age or older. The median age was 48 years. For every 100 females, there were 102.9 males. For every 100 females age 18 and over, there were 106.7 males.

The median income for a household in the township was $40,972, and the median income for a family was $47,500. Males had a median income of $35,972 versus $25,875 for females. The per capita income for the township was $20,983. None of the families and 1.1% of the population were living below the poverty line, including no under eighteens and none of those over 64.
