= Atlanta Township, Becker County, Minnesota =

Atlanta Township, Minnesota
- Township
- Location of Atlanta Township, within Becker County, Minnesota

- Location within the state of Minnesota Atlanta Township, Minnesota (the United States)
- Coordinates: 47°1′41″N 96°7′6″W
- Country: United States
- State: Minnesota
- County: Becker

Area
  - Total: 36.1 sq mi (93.5 km^{2})
  - Land: 35.6 sq mi (92.1 km^{2})
  - Water: 0.54 sq mi (1.4 km^{2})
- Elevation: 1,207 ft (368 m)

Population (2020)
  - Total: 115
  - Density: 3.23/sq mi (1.25/km^{2})
- Time zone: UTC-6 (Central (CST))
  - Summer (DST): UTC-5 (CDT)
- FIPS code: 27-02674
- GNIS feature ID: 0663473

Atlanta Township is a township in Becker County, Minnesota, United States. The population was 115 as of the 2020 census.

== History ==
Atlanta Township was organized in 1879. The township's name is derived from its undulating surface (the prairie grass) said to resemble the waters of the Atlantic Ocean.

== Geography ==
According to the United States Census Bureau, the township has a total area of 36.1 square miles (93 km^{2}), of which 35.6 square miles (92 km^{2}) is land and 0.6 square miles (1.6 km^{2}) (1.52%) is water.

=== Lakes ===
- Balke Lake
- Rustad Lake
- Tilde Lake

=== Adjacent townships ===
- Walworth Township (north)
- Spring Creek Township (northeast)
- Riceville Township (east)
- Cuba Township (south)
- Highland Grove Township, Clay County (southwest)
- Goose Prairie Township, Clay County (west)
- Ulen Township, Clay County (northwest)

=== Cemeteries ===
The township contains Atlanta Cemetery.

== Demographics ==
As of the census of 2000, there were 113 people, 44 households, and 34 families residing in the township. The population density was 3.2 inhabitants per square mile (1.2/km^{2}). There were 46 housing units at an average density of 1.3 per square mile (0.50/km^{2}). The racial makeup of the township was 99.12% White and 0.88% Asian.

There were 44 households, out of which 36.4% had children under the age of 18 living with them, 68.2% were married couples living together, 4.5% had a female householder with no husband present, and 20.5% were non-families. 20.5% of all households were made up of individuals, and 6.8% had someone living alone who was 65 years of age or older. The average household size was 2.57 and the average family size was 2.94.

In the township the population was spread out, with 26.5% under the age of 18, 9.7% from 18 to 24, 27.4% from 25 to 44, 28.3% from 45 to 64, and 8.0% who were 65 years of age or older. The median age was 32 years. For every 100 females, there were 130.6 males. For every 100 females age 18 and over, there were 137.1 males.

The median income for a household in the township was $28,393, and the median income for a family was $31,875. Males had a median income of $27,083 versus $20,000 for females. The per capita income for the township was $11,453. There were no families and 8.5% of the population living below the poverty line, including no under eighteens and 35.3% of those over 64.
