= Height of Land Township, Becker County, Minnesota =

Height of Land Township, Minnesota
- Township
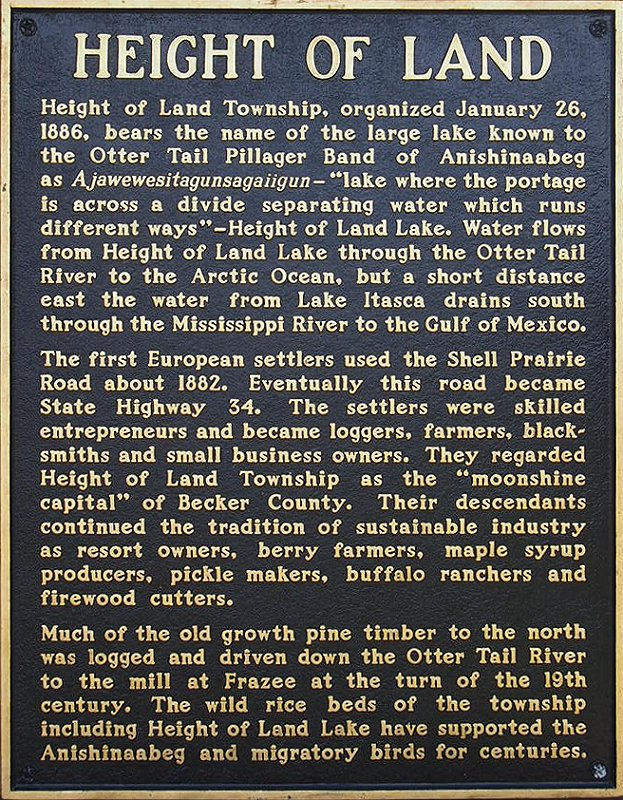
- Historical marker in Height of Land Township

- Location of Height of Land Township, within Becker County, Minnesota

- Location within the state of Minnesota Height of Land Township, Minnesota (the United States)
- Coordinates: 46°54′27″N 95°37′2″W
- Country: United States
- State: Minnesota
- County: Becker

Area
  - Total: 71.5 sq mi (185.2 km^{2})
  - Land: 58.0 sq mi (150.3 km^{2})
  - Water: 13.5 sq mi (34.9 km^{2})
- Elevation: 1,453 ft (443 m)

Population (2020)
  - Total: 682
  - Density: 11.8/sq mi (4.54/km^{2})
- Time zone: UTC-6 (Central (CST))
  - Summer (DST): UTC-5 (CDT)
- FIPS code: 27-28250
- GNIS feature ID: 0664440
- Website: https://www.heightoflandtownship.com/

Height of Land Township is a township in Becker County, Minnesota, United States. The population was 682 as of the 2020 census.

== History ==
Height of Land Township was organized in 1886. The township is the English translation of an Ojibwe language name for the Height of Land Lake.

== Geography ==
According to the United States Census Bureau, the township has a total area of 71.5 square miles (185 km^{2}), of which 58.0 square miles (150 km^{2}) is land and 13.5 square miles (35 km^{2}) (18.84%) is water.

=== Major highway ===
- Minnesota State Highway 34

=== Lakes ===
- Alvin Lake
- Blackbird Lake
- Booth Lake
- Chippewa Lake (vast majority)
- Evans Lake
- Flat Lake (south half)
- Hanson Lake
- Height Of Land Lake
- High Lake
- Island Lake (west edge)
- Johnson Lake
- Little Toad Lake
- Lake Twentyfive (vast majority)
- Mud Lake
- N Twin Lake
- Pine Lake
- Rice Lake
- S Twin Lake (vast majority)
- Tamarack Lake (east quarter)
- Wetteles Lake

=== Adjacent townships ===
- Round Lake Township (northeast)
- Shell Lake Township (east)
- Toad Lake Township (east)
- Evergreen Township (southeast)
- Silver Leaf Township (south)
- Burlington Township (southwest)
- Erie Township (west)
- Holmesville Township (west)
- Sugar Bush Township (northwest)

=== Cemeteries ===
The township contains these five cemeteries: Church of the Wildwood, Mennonite, Mount Olive, Saint John's Lutheran and Senjen.

== Climate ==
Detroit Lakes 12E is a weather station located near Height of the Land Lake.

Climate data for Detroit Lakes 12E, Minnesota, 1991–2020 normals, 2010-2020 precip/snowfall: 1542ft (470m)
Month	Jan	Feb	Mar	Apr	May	Jun	Jul	Aug	Sep	Oct	Nov	Dec	Year
Record high °F (°C)	51 (11)	53 (12)	72 (22)	81 (27)	90 (32)	90 (32)	92 (33)	90 (32)	88 (31)	88 (31)	72 (22)	48 (9)	92 (33)
Mean maximum °F (°C)	40.3 (4.6)	40.7 (4.8)	56.5 (13.6)	69.9 (21.1)	83.9 (28.8)	85.6 (29.8)	87.3 (30.7)	85.5 (29.7)	82.0 (27.8)	76.0 (24.4)	56.6 (13.7)	41.7 (5.4)	86.0 (30.0)
Mean daily maximum °F (°C)	16.7 (−8.5)	21.1 (−6.1)	34.0 (1.1)	50.2 (10.1)	63.9 (17.7)	72.8 (22.7)	76.6 (24.8)	75.1 (23.9)	66.7 (19.3)	52.1 (11.2)	34.9 (1.6)	21.8 (−5.7)	48.8 (9.3)
Daily mean °F (°C)	7.5 (−13.6)	11.5 (−11.4)	25.2 (−3.8)	40.2 (4.6)	53.9 (12.2)	63.2 (17.3)	67.9 (19.9)	65.9 (18.8)	57.3 (14.1)	43.5 (6.4)	27.4 (−2.6)	14.4 (−9.8)	39.8 (4.3)
Mean daily minimum °F (°C)	−1.7 (−18.7)	1.9 (−16.7)	16.3 (−8.7)	30.1 (−1.1)	44.0 (6.7)	53.7 (12.1)	59.2 (15.1)	56.7 (13.7)	47.8 (8.8)	34.8 (1.6)	19.9 (−6.7)	7.0 (−13.9)	30.8 (−0.6)
Mean minimum °F (°C)	−27.9 (−33.3)	−23.2 (−30.7)	−8.5 (−22.5)	13.3 (−10.4)	28.5 (−1.9)	43.1 (6.2)	49.1 (9.5)	46.4 (8.0)	33.8 (1.0)	20.2 (−6.6)	0.3 (−17.6)	−19.1 (−28.4)	−28.3 (−33.5)
Record low °F (°C)	−41 (−41)	−31 (−35)	−24 (−31)	−4 (−20)	22 (−6)	40 (4)	44 (7)	44 (7)	26 (−3)	11 (−12)	−16 (−27)	−30 (−34)	−41 (−41)
Average precipitation inches (mm)	0.12 (3.0)	0.22 (5.6)	0.60 (15)	1.79 (45)	3.36 (85)	4.49 (114)	5.41 (137)	3.38 (86)	3.05 (77)	1.98 (50)	0.65 (17)	0.17 (4.3)	25.22 (638.9)
Average snowfall inches (cm)	11.0 (28)	11.1 (28)	7.8 (20)	4.0 (10)	0.3 (0.76)	0.0 (0.0)	0.0 (0.0)	0.0 (0.0)	0.0 (0.0)	2.6 (6.6)	5.3 (13)	12.9 (33)	55 (139.36)
Source 1: NOAA
Source 2: XMACIS (snowfall/precipitation, temp records & monthly max/mins)

== Demographics ==
As of the census of 2000, there were 639 people, 244 households, and 186 families residing in the township. The population density was 11.0 inhabitants per square mile (4.2/km^{2}). There were 385 housing units at an average density of 6.6 per square mile (2.5/km^{2}). The racial makeup of the township was 96.56% White, 1.56% Native American, 0.16% from other races, and 1.72% from two or more races. Hispanic or Latino of any race were 0.31% of the population.

There were 244 households, out of which 28.3% had children under the age of 18 living with them, 70.5% were married couples living together, 4.5% had a female householder with no husband present, and 23.4% were non-families. 18.0% of all households were made up of individuals, and 6.6% had someone living alone who was 65 years of age or older. The average household size was 2.62 and the average family size was 2.98.

In the township the population was spread out, with 24.3% under the age of 18, 7.8% from 18 to 24, 25.8% from 25 to 44, 32.2% from 45 to 64, and 9.9% who were 65 years of age or older. The median age was 40 years. For every 100 females, there were 111.6 males. For every 100 females age 18 and over, there were 107.7 males.

The median income for a household in the township was $36,154, and the median income for a family was $39,500. Males had a median income of $26,071 versus $20,952 for females. The per capita income for the township was $16,973. About 6.9% of families and 8.1% of the population were below the poverty line, including 1.3% of those under age 18 and 10.7% of those age 65 or over.
