= Richwood Township, Becker County, Minnesota =

Richwood Township, Minnesota
- Township
- Location of Richwood Township, within Becker County, Minnesota

- Location within the state of Minnesota Richwood Township, Minnesota (the United States)
- Coordinates: 46°56′32″N 95°50′53″W
- Country: United States
- State: Minnesota
- County: Becker

Area
  - Total: 36.0 sq mi (93.2 km^{2})
  - Land: 34.1 sq mi (88.3 km^{2})
  - Water: 1.9 sq mi (4.9 km^{2})
- Elevation: 1,440 ft (439 m)

Population (2020)
  - Total: 651
  - Density: 19.1/sq mi (7.37/km^{2})
- Time zone: UTC-6 (Central (CST))
  - Summer (DST): UTC-5 (CDT)
- ZIP code: 56577
- Area code: 218
- FIPS code: 27-54376
- GNIS feature ID: 0665419

Richwood Township is a township in Becker County, Minnesota, United States. The population was 651 as of the 2020 census.

== History ==
Richwood Township was organized in 1871. It was named after a place called Richwood in Ontario, Canada, the former hometown of an early settler.

== Geography ==
According to the United States Census Bureau, the township has a total area of 36.0 square miles (93.2 km^{2}), of which 34.1 square miles (88.3 km^{2}) is land and 1.9 square miles (4.9 km^{2}) (5.23%) is water.

=== Major highway ===
- U.S. Route 59

=== Lakes ===
- Bean Lake
- Buffalo Lake (west quarter)
- Cabbage Lake
- Campbell Lake
- Corn Lake
- Harding Lake
- Houg Lake
- Lake Kraut
- Pearson Lake
- Pork Lake
- Sands Lake
- Tomato Lake

=== Adjacent townships ===
- Callaway Township (north)
- Sugar Bush Township (northeast)
- Holmesville Township (east)
- Erie Township (southeast)
- Detroit Township (south)
- Audubon Township (southwest)
- Hamden Township (west)

=== Cemeteries ===
The township contains these five cemeteries: Bakke Lutheran, Buffalo Lake, Lund, Richwood and Upsala.

== Demographics ==
As of the census of 2000, there were 610 people, 225 households, and 177 families residing in the township. The population density was 17.9 people per square mile (6.9/km^{2}). There were 246 housing units at an average density of 7.2/sq mi (2.8/km^{2}). The racial makeup of the township was 92.13% White, 0.82% African American, 3.93% Native American, 0.33% Pacific Islander, and 2.79% from two or more races.

There were 225 households, out of which 33.8% had children under the age of 18 living with them, 71.1% were married couples living together, 2.7% had a female householder with no husband present, and 21.3% were non-families. 16.4% of all households were made up of individuals, and 7.6% had someone living alone who was 65 years of age or older. The average household size was 2.71 and the average family size was 3.02.

In the township the population was spread out, with 27.0% under the age of 18, 7.4% from 18 to 24, 27.2% from 25 to 44, 28.4% from 45 to 64, and 10.0% who were 65 years of age or older. The median age was 38 years. For every 100 females, there were 110.3 males. For every 100 females age 18 and over, there were 107.0 males.

The median income for a household in the township was $43,125, and the median income for a family was $47,083. Males had a median income of $29,125 versus $21,250 for females. The per capita income for the township was $18,149. About 7.5% of families and 14.6% of the population were below the poverty line, including 28.9% of those under age 18 and 7.8% of those age 65 or over.
