= Syre, Minnesota =

Unincorporated community in Minnesota

Syre
- Unincorporated community
- Location within Minnesota Location within the United States
- Coordinates: 47°10′49″N 96°15′31″W
- Country: United States
- State: Minnesota
- County: Norman
- Elevation: 1,122 ft (342 m)
- Time zone: UTC-6 (Central (CST))
  - Summer (DST): UTC-5 (CDT)
- Area code: 218
- GNIS feature ID: 654971

Syre is an unincorporated community in Home Lake Township, Norman County, Minnesota, United States.

The community is located south of Twin Valley and southeast of Ada at the junction of Minnesota State Highways 32 and 113.

A post office was established at Syre in 1891, and remained in operation until 1936. Syre was a station on the railroad.
