= Holmesville Township, Becker County, Minnesota =

Holmesville Township, Minnesota
- Township
- Location of Holmesville Township, within Becker County, Minnesota

- Location within the state of Minnesota Holmesville Township, Minnesota (the United States)
- Coordinates: 46°56′7″N 95°43′42″W
- Country: United States
- State: Minnesota
- County: Becker

Area
  - Total: 36.1 sq mi (93.6 km^{2})
  - Land: 28.1 sq mi (72.7 km^{2})
  - Water: 8.1 sq mi (20.9 km^{2})
- Elevation: 1,440 ft (440 m)

Population (2020)
  - Total: 543
  - Density: 19.3/sq mi (7.47/km^{2})
- Time zone: UTC-6 (Central (CST))
  - Summer (DST): UTC-5 (CDT)
- FIPS code: 27-29816
- GNIS feature ID: 0664504

Holmesville Township is a township in Becker County, Minnesota, United States. The population was 543 as of the 2020 census.

== History ==
Holmesville Township was named for Elon G. Holmes, a state senator.

== Geography ==
According to the United States Census Bureau, the township has a total area of 36.1 square miles (93 km^{2}), of which 28.1 square miles (73 km^{2}) is land and 8.1 square miles (21 km^{2}) (22.31%) is water.

=== Lakes ===
- Balsam Lake
- Buffalo Lake (east three-quarters)
- Cotton Lake (north quarter)
- Five Lake (north edge)
- Flat Lake (west quarter)
- Little Cotton Lake
- Little Round Lake (vast majority)
- Loon Lake (northeast half)
- Momb Lake
- N Momb Lake (south quarter)
- N Twin Lake
- Pickerel Lake (north edge)
- Rice Lake
- Rochert Lake
- Rock Lake
- S Twin Lake
- Spring Lake
- Tamarack Lake (west three-quarters)
- Werk Lake

=== Adjacent townships ===
- Sugar Bush Township (northeast)
- Height of Land Township (east)
- Erie Township (south)
- Detroit Township (southwest)
- Richwood Township (west)

=== Cemeteries ===
The township contains these two cemeteries: Egelund Lutheran and Holmesville Township.

== Demographics ==
As of the census of 2000, there were 457 people, 179 households, and 131 families residing in the township. The population density was 16.3 inhabitants per square mile (6.3/km^{2}). There were 295 housing units at an average density of 10.5 per square mile (4.1/km^{2}). The racial makeup of the township was 93.87% White, 3.50% Native American, 0.44% from other races, and 2.19% from two or more races.

There were 179 households, out of which 27.9% had children under the age of 18 living with them, 69.8% were married couples living together, 2.2% had a female householder with no husband present, and 26.3% were non-families. 21.8% of all households were made up of individuals, and 7.8% had someone living alone who was 65 years of age or older. The average household size was 2.55 and the average family size was 3.02.

In the township the population was spread out, with 24.5% under the age of 18, 4.6% from 18 to 24, 24.9% from 25 to 44, 32.2% from 45 to 64, and 13.8% who were 65 years of age or older. The median age was 43 years. For every 100 females, there were 101.3 males. For every 100 females age 18 and over, there were 104.1 males.

The median income for a household in the township was $32,500, and the median income for a family was $44,167. Males had a median income of $32,222 versus $21,071 for females. The per capita income for the township was $18,366. About 9.1% of families and 11.6% of the population were below the poverty line, including 12.1% of those under age 18 and 2.9% of those age 65 or over.
