= Erie Township, Becker County, Minnesota =

Erie Township
- Township
- Location of Erie Township, within Becker County, Minnesota

- Location within the state of Minnesota Erie Township (the United States)
- Coordinates: 46°52′2″N 95°43′2″W
- Country: United States
- State: Minnesota
- County: Becker
- Organized: 1878
- Named for: Erie County

Government
  - Type: Board of Supervisors
  - Town Clerk: Karen Stenerson-Eifealdt

Area
  - Total: 36.3 sq mi (94.1 km^{2})
  - Land: 32.3 sq mi (83.6 km^{2})
  - Water: 4.1 sq mi (10.6 km^{2})
- Elevation: 1,496 ft (456 m)

Population (2020)
  - Total: 1,717
  - Density: 53.2/sq mi (20.5/km^{2})
- Time zone: UTC-6 (Central (CST))
  - Summer (DST): UTC-5 (CDT)
- FIPS code: 27-19646
- GNIS feature ID: 0664107
- Website: https://www.erietownshipmn.com/

Erie Township is a township in Becker County, Minnesota, United States. The population was 1,717 as of the 2020 census.

== History ==
Erie Township was organized in 1878. It was named after Erie County, New York, the native home territory of its early settlers.

== Geography ==
According to the United States Census Bureau, the township has a total area of 36.3 square miles (94.1 km^{2}), of which 32.3 square miles (83.6 km^{2}) is land and 4.1 square miles (10.6 km^{2}), or 11.21%, is water.

=== Major highway ===
- Minnesota State Highway 34

=== Lakes ===
- Cotton Lake (southwest three-quarters)
- Fisher Lake
- Five Lake (vast majority)
- Fox Lake
- Howe Lake
- Irish Lake
- Loon Lake (southeast half)
- Neuner Lake
- Perch Lake
- Pickerel Lake (vast majority)
- Rice Lake
- Schultz Lake
- St Patrick Lake

=== Adjacent townships ===
- Holmesville Township (north)
- Height of Land Township (east)
- Silver Leaf Township (southeast)
- Burlington Township (south)
- Lake View Township (southwest)
- Detroit Township (west)
- Richwood Township (northwest)

== Demographics ==
Historical population
Census	Pop.	Note	%±
2000	1,621		—
2010	1,642		1.3%

As of the census of 2000, there were 1,621 people, 596 households, and 463 families residing in the township. The population density was 50.5 inhabitants per square mile (19.5/km^{2}). There were 823 housing units at an average density of 25.6 units per square mile (9.9 units/km^{2}). The racial makeup of the township was 95.37% White, 0.06% African American, 1.73% Native American, 0.12% Asian, 0.19% from other races, and 2.53% from two or more races. Hispanic or Latino of any race were 0.31% of the population.

There were 596 households, out of which 36.6% had children under the age of 18 living with them, 68.3% were married couples living together, 5.5% had a female householder with no husband present, and 22.3% were non-families. 18.1% of all households were made up of individuals, and 6.7% had someone living alone who was 65 years of age or older. The average household size was 2.71 and the average family size was 3.10.

In the township the population was spread out, with 29.4% under the age of 18, 6.4% from 18 to 24, 27.9% from 25 to 44, 25.5% from 45 to 64, and 10.9% who were 65 years of age or older. The median age was 38 years. For every 100 females, there were 104.2 males. For every 100 females age 18 and over, there were 104.3 males.

The median income for a household in the township was $43,024, and the median income for a family was $45,875. Males had a median income of $31,742 versus $19,167 for females. The per capita income for the township was $18,837. About 2.5% of families and 4.2% of the population were below the poverty line, including 6.3% of those under age 18 and 3.3% of those age 65 or over.
