= Riceville Township, Becker County, Minnesota =

Riceville Township, Minnesota
- Township
- Location of Riceville Township, within Becker County, Minnesota

- Location within the state of Minnesota Riceville Township, Minnesota (the United States)
- Coordinates: 47°0′49″N 95°59′41″W
- Country: United States
- State: Minnesota
- County: Becker

Area
  - Total: 37.5 sq mi (97.2 km^{2})
  - Land: 37.0 sq mi (95.9 km^{2})
  - Water: 0.50 sq mi (1.3 km^{2})
- Elevation: 1,237 ft (377 m)

Population (2020)
  - Total: 118
  - Density: 3.19/sq mi (1.23/km^{2})
- Time zone: UTC-6 (Central (CST))
  - Summer (DST): UTC-5 (CDT)
- FIPS code: 27-54142
- GNIS feature ID: 0665410

Riceville Township is a township in Becker County, Minnesota, United States. The population was 118 as of the 2020 census. Riceville Township derives its name from the Wild Rice River.

== Geography ==
According to the United States Census Bureau, the township has a total area of 37.5 square miles (97.3 km^{2}), of which 37.0 square miles (95.9 km^{2}) is land and 0.5 square miles (1.3 km^{2}) (1.36%) is water.

=== Lakes ===
- Plum Grove Lake
- Trotterchaud Lake

=== Adjacent townships ===
- Spring Creek Township (north)
- White Earth Township (northeast)
- Callaway Township (east)
- Hamden Township (south)
- Cuba Township (southwest)
- Atlanta Township (west)
- Walworth Township (northwest)

== Demographics ==
As of the census of 2010, there were 83 people, 31 households, and 23 families residing in the township. The population density was 2.2 people per square mile (0.8/km^{2}). There were 33 housing units at an average density of 1.1/sq mi (0.3/km^{2}). The racial makeup of the township was 85.5% White, 4.8% Hispanic or Latino and 9.6% from two or more races.

There were 31 households, out of which 32.3% had children under the age of 18 living with them, 64.5% were married couples living together, 3.2% had a female householder with no husband present, and 25.8% were non-families. 22.6% of all households were made up of individuals, and 6.5% had someone living alone who was 65 years of age or older. The average household size was 2.65 and the average family size was 3.09.

In the township the population was spread out, with 28.9% under the age of 18, 3.8% from 18 to 24, 20.4% from 25 to 44, 31.2% from 45 to 64, and 15.7% who were 65 years of age or older. The median age was 43.5 years. There were 49 males (59%) and 34 females (41%).

The median income for a household in the township was $42,500, and the median income for a family was $36,250. Individuals below the poverty line was 1.3%. According to the 2010 Census, Males had a median income of $28,125 versus $20,000 for females. The per capita income for the township was $10,999.
