= Detroit Township, Becker County, Minnesota =

Detroit Township, Minnesota
- Township
- Location of Detroit Township, within Becker County, Minnesota

- Location within the state of Minnesota Detroit Township, Minnesota (the United States)
- Coordinates: 46°50′33″N 95°51′36″W
- Country: United States
- State: Minnesota
- County: Becker

Area
  - Total: 28.2 sq mi (73.0 km^{2})
  - Land: 23.6 sq mi (61.1 km^{2})
  - Water: 4.6 sq mi (11.9 km^{2})
- Elevation: 1,368 ft (417 m)

Population (2020)
  - Total: 2,093
  - Density: 88.7/sq mi (34.3/km^{2})
- Time zone: UTC-6 (Central (CST))
  - Summer (DST): UTC-5 (CDT)
- FIPS code: 27-15814
- GNIS feature ID: 0663972

Detroit Township is a township in Becker County, Minnesota, United States. The population was 2,093 as of the 2020 census.

== History ==
Detroit Township was organized in 1871.

== Geography ==
According to the United States Census Bureau, the township has a total area of 28.2 square miles (73.0 km^{2}), of which 23.6 square miles (61.1 km^{2}) is land and 4.6 square miles (11.9 km^{2}), or 16.33%, is water.

The north half of the city of Detroit Lakes is within this township geographically but Detroit Lakes is a separate entity.

=== Major highways ===
- U.S. Route 10
- U.S. Route 59
- Minnesota State Highway 34

=== Lakes ===
- Brandy Lake
- Floyd Lake
- Kennedy Lake
- Leitheiser Lake
- Little Floyd Lake
- Long Lake (vast majority)
- Mud Lake
- Mud Lake (north three-quarters)
- Oak Lake
- Oar Lake
- Rice Lake
- Rice Lake (vast majority)
- St Clair Lake (north quarter)
- Strunk Lake
- Tamarack Lake
- Wheeler Lake
- Wine Lake

=== Adjacent townships ===
- Richwood Township (north)
- Holmesville Township (northeast)
- Erie Township (east)
- Burlington Township (southeast)
- Lake View Township (south)
- Lake Eunice Township (southwest)
- Audubon Township (west)
- Hamden Township (northwest)

== Demographics ==
As of the census of 2000, there were 2,359 people, 899 households, and 692 families residing in the township. The population density was 91.0 inhabitants per square mile (35.1/km^{2}). There were 1,186 housing units at an average density of 45.8 per square mile (17.7/km^{2}). The racial makeup of the township was 92.92% White, 0.08% African American, 3.69% Native American, 0.64% Asian, 0.34% from other races, and 2.33% from two or more races. Hispanic or Latino of any race were 0.72% of the population.

There were 899 households, out of which 34.1% had children under the age of 18 living with them, 67.9% were married couples living together, 6.1% had a female householder with no husband present, and 23.0% were non-families. 19.2% of all households were made up of individuals, and 7.2% had someone living alone who was 65 years of age or older. The average household size was 2.62 and the average family size was 3.00.

In the township the population was spread out, with 26.2% under the age of 18, 6.8% from 18 to 24, 24.4% from 25 to 44, 29.9% from 45 to 64, and 12.7% who were 65 years of age or older. The median age was 40 years. For every 100 females, there were 102.1 males. For every 100 females age 18 and over, there were 101.3 males.

The median income for a household in the township was $42,644, and the median income for a family was $50,326. Males had a median income of $31,875 versus $21,364 for females. The per capita income for the township was $20,529. About 3.7% of families and 6.4% of the population were below the poverty line, including 10.1% of those under age 18 and 6.7% of those age 65 or over.
