= Vergas, Minnesota =

City in Minnesota, United States

Vergas
- City
- Location of Vergas, Minnesota
- Coordinates: 46°39′17″N 95°48′11″W
- Country: United States
- State: Minnesota
- County: Otter Tail
- Founded: 1903

Area
  - Total: 1.61 sq mi (4.16 km^{2})
  - Land: 1.57 sq mi (4.06 km^{2})
  - Water: 0.039 sq mi (0.10 km^{2})
- Elevation: 1,411 ft (430 m)

Population (2020)
  - Total: 348
  - Estimate (2021): 348
  - Density: 222.2/sq mi (85.81/km^{2})
- Time zone: UTC-6 (CST)
  - Summer (DST): UTC-5 (CDT)
- ZIP code: 56587
- Area code: 218
- FIPS code: 27-66766
- GNIS feature ID: 2397125
- Website: cityofvergas.com

Vergas is a city in northern Otter Tail County, Minnesota, United States. The population was 348 at the 2020 census.

Vergas claims it is home of the World's Largest Loon, actually a 20-foot-high (6.1 m) sculpture of a loon, the Minnesota state bird.

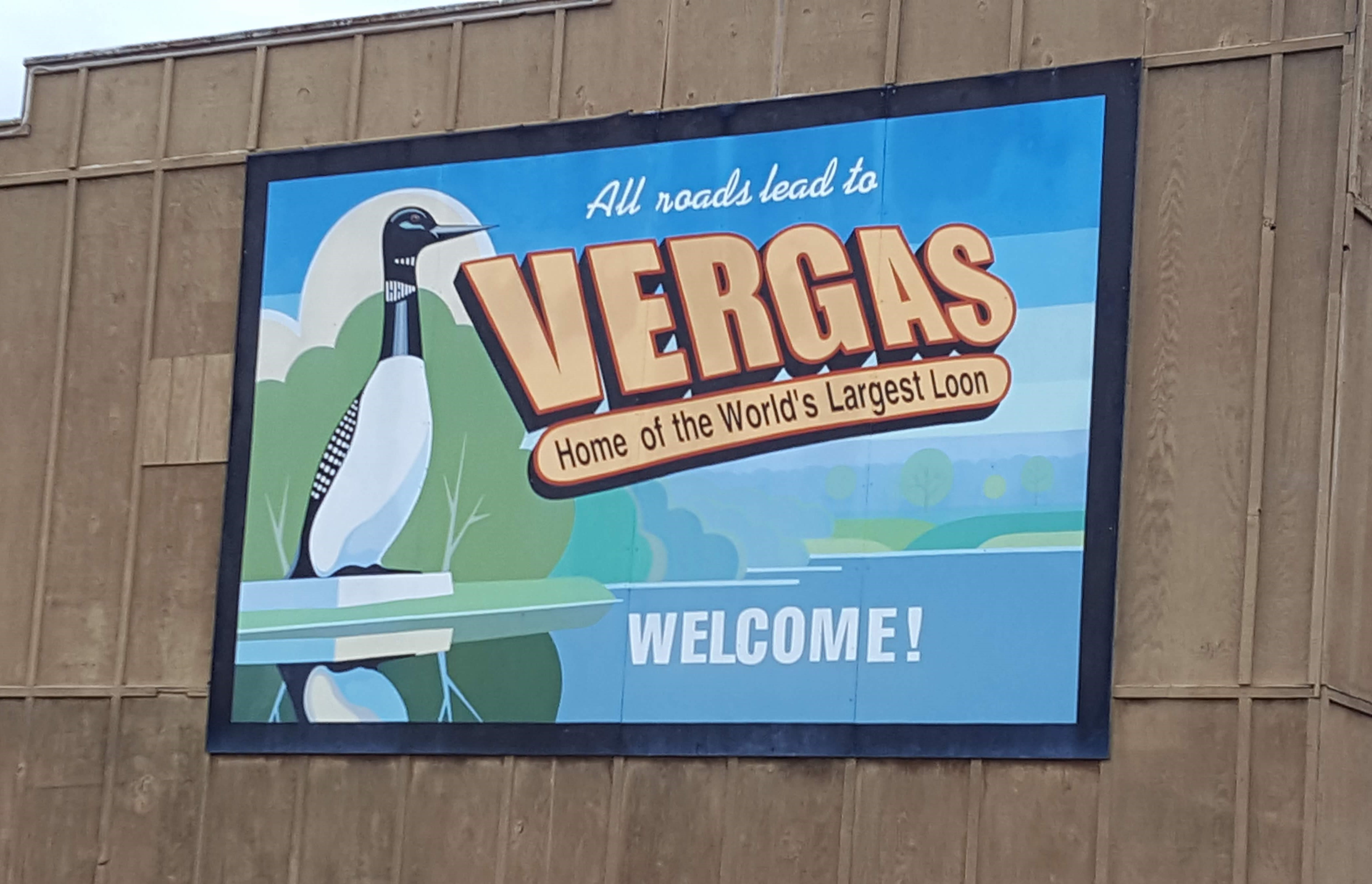
Sign welcoming visitors to Vergas

== History ==
The community was platted in 1903 as Altona, but quickly changed its name to match the name of its Soo Line Railroad station, which had been named after a series of sleeping cars that traveled between Minneapolis, Minnesota and Winnipeg, Manitoba.

== Geography ==
According to the United States Census Bureau, the city has a total area of 1.50 square miles (3.88 km^{2}), of which 1.46 square miles (3.78 km^{2}) is land and 0.04 square miles (0.10 km^{2}) is water.

Vergas is located at the junction of County Highway 4, County Highway 17, and former State Highway 228.

The community is at the west end of Long Lake.

Loon Lake is immediately southwest of Vergas.

== Demographics ==
Historical population
Census	Pop.	Note	%±
1910	237		—
1920	361		52.3%
1930	323		−10.5%
1940	351		8.7%
1950	301		−14.2%
1960	292		−3.0%
1970	281		−3.8%
1980	287		2.1%
1990	287		0.0%
2000	311		8.4%
2010	331		6.4%
2020	348		5.1%
2021 (est.)	348		0.0%
U.S. Decennial Census; 2020 Census

=== 2010 census ===
As of the census of 2010, there were 331 people, 176 households, and 88 families living in the city. The population density was 226.7 inhabitants per square mile (87.5/km^{2}). There were 202 housing units at an average density of 138.4 per square mile (53.4/km^{2}). The racial makeup of the city was 99.1% White, 0.3% African American, 0.3% from other races, and 0.3% from two or more races. Hispanic or Latino of any race were 0.3% of the population.

There were 176 households, of which 14.8% had children under the age of 18 living with them, 42.6% were married couples living together, 3.4% had a female householder with no husband present, 4.0% had a male householder with no wife present, and 50.0% were non-families. 42.6% of all households were made up of individuals, and 23.3% had someone living alone who was 65 years of age or older. The average household size was 1.88 and the average family size was 2.55.

The median age in the city was 52.5 years. 13.3% of residents were under the age of 18; 5.6% were between the ages of 18 and 24; 22.6% were from 25 to 44; 30.8% were from 45 to 64; and 27.5% were 65 years of age or older. The gender makeup of the city was 49.5% male and 50.5% female.

=== 2000 census ===
As of the census of 2000, there were 311 people, 143 households, and 78 families living in the city. The population density was 213.9 inhabitants per square mile (82.6/km^{2}). There were 165 housing units at an average density of 113.5 per square mile (43.8/km^{2}). The racial makeup of the city was 97.75% White, 0.32% African American, 0.32% Native American, and 1.61% from two or more races. Hispanic or Latino of any race were 0.96% of the population.

There were 143 households, out of which 25.9% had children under the age of 18 living with them, 46.2% were married couples living together, 6.3% had a female householder with no husband present, and 44.8% were non-families. 38.5% of all households were made up of individuals, and 21.7% had someone living alone who was 65 years of age or older. The average household size was 2.17 and the average family size was 2.91.

In the city, the population was spread out, with 21.2% under the age of 18, 9.0% from 18 to 24, 23.5% from 25 to 44, 21.2% from 45 to 64, and 25.1% who were 65 years of age or older. The median age was 43 years. For every 100 females, there were 107.3 males. For every 100 females age 18 and over, there were 99.2 males.

The median income for a household in the city was $27,344, and the median income for a family was $37,250. Males had a median income of $23,214 versus $17,222 for females. The per capita income for the city was $14,461. About 4.7% of families and 7.9% of the population were below the poverty line, including none of those under age 18 and 19.7% of those age 65 or over.

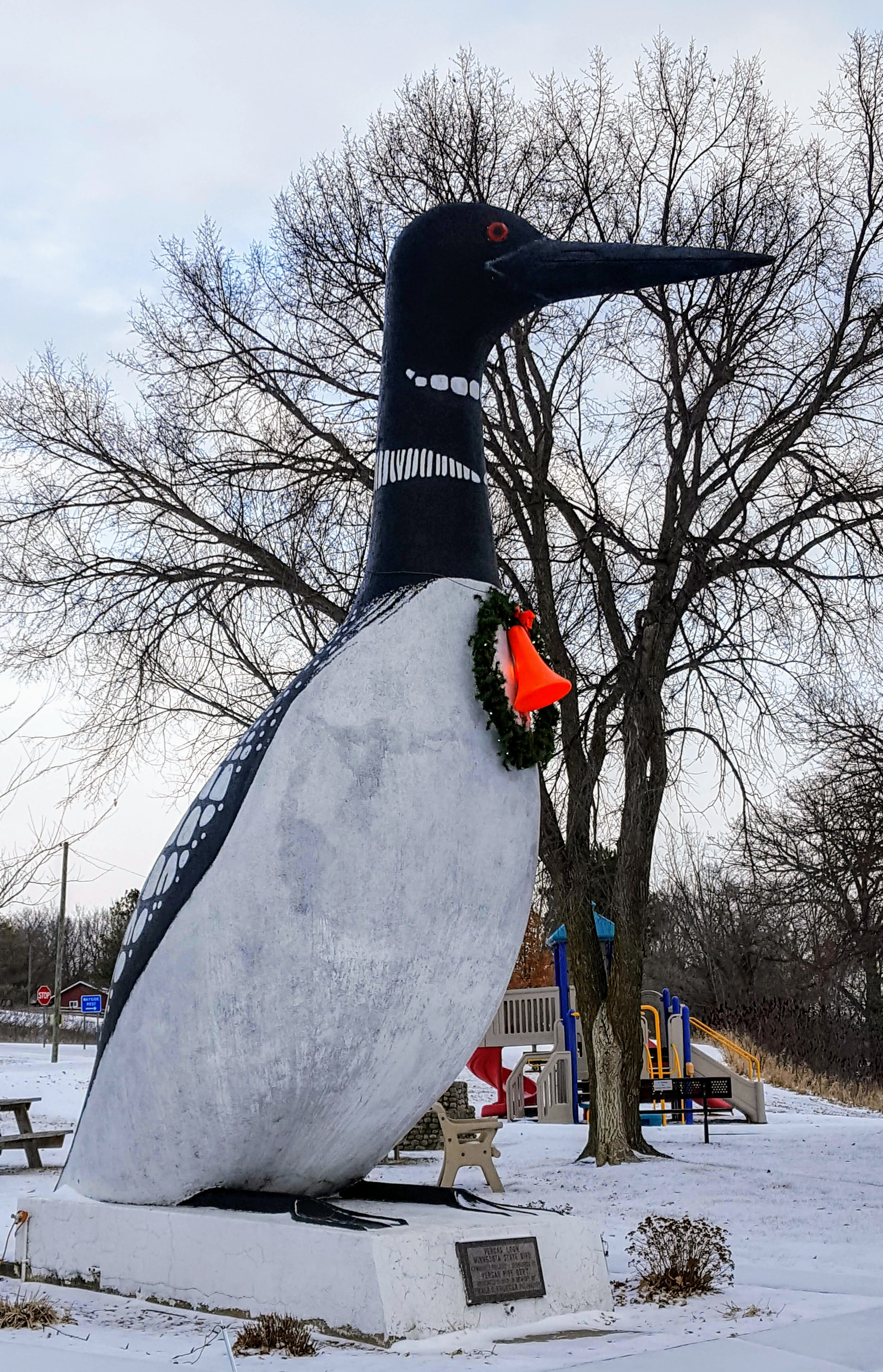
The world's largest loon decorated for Christmas

== The Loon ==
The loon statue overlooks Long Lake. Standing 20 feet tall, the sculpture was built in the 1960s and paid for by the Vergas Fire Department, who dedicated it to a deceased town postmaster.
