= Callaway Township, Becker County, Minnesota =

Callaway Township, Minnesota
- Township
- Location of Callaway Township, within Becker County, Minnesota

- Location within the state of Minnesota Callaway Township, Minnesota (the United States)
- Coordinates: 47°0′57″N 95°52′12″W
- Country: United States
- State: Minnesota
- County: Becker

Area
  - Total: 35.3 sq mi (91.4 km^{2})
  - Land: 33.9 sq mi (87.7 km^{2})
  - Water: 1.4 sq mi (3.7 km^{2})
- Elevation: 1,424 ft (434 m)

Population (2020)
  - Total: 304
  - Density: 8.98/sq mi (3.47/km^{2})
- Time zone: UTC-6 (Central (CST))
  - Summer (DST): UTC-5 (CDT)
- ZIP code: 56521
- Area code: 218
- FIPS code: 27-09298
- GNIS feature ID: 0663727

Callaway Township is a township in Becker County, Minnesota, United States. The population was 304 as of the 2020 census.

== History ==
Callaway Township was organized in 1906. It was named for William R. Callaway, an official with the Minneapolis, St. Paul and Sault Ste. Marie Railroad.

== Geography ==
According to the United States Census Bureau, the township has a total area of 35.3 square miles (91 km^{2}), of which 33.9 square miles (88 km^{2}) is land and 1.4 square miles (3.6 km^{2}) (4.00%) is water.

The city of Callaway is within this township geographically but is a separate entity.

=== Major highway ===
- U.S. Route 59

=== Lakes ===
- Anderson Lake
- Birch Lake (southwest quarter)
- Carrott Lake
- Fairbanks Lake
- Island Lake (west edge)
- O-Me-Mee Lake
- Squash Lake
- St Clair Lake
- Vizenor Lake

=== Adjacent townships ===
- White Earth Township (north)
- Maple Grove Township (northeast)
- Sugar Bush Township (east)
- Richwood Township (south)
- Hamden Township (southwest)
- Riceville Township (west)
- Spring Creek Township (northwest)

=== Cemeteries ===
The township contains Saint Marys Cemetery.

== Demographics ==
As of the census of 2000, there were 260 people, 94 households, and 73 families residing in the township. The population density was 7.7 inhabitants per square mile (3.0/km^{2}). There were 103 housing units at an average density of 3.0 per square mile (1.2/km^{2}). The racial makeup of the township was 70.77% White, 17.31% Native American, and 11.92% from two or more races. Hispanic or Latino of any race were 1.92% of the population.

There were 94 households, out of which 29.8% had children under the age of 18 living with them, 62.8% were married couples living together, 8.5% had a female householder with no husband present, and 22.3% were non-families. 22.3% of all households were made up of individuals, and 4.3% had someone living alone who was 65 years of age or older. The average household size was 2.77 and the average family size was 3.23.

In the township the population was spread out, with 28.1% under the age of 18, 9.2% from 18 to 24, 24.2% from 25 to 44, 24.6% from 45 to 64, and 13.8% who were 65 years of age or older. The median age was 38 years. For every 100 females, there were 104.7 males. For every 100 females age 18 and over, there were 120.0 males.

The median income for a household in the township was $33,542, and the median income for a family was $35,750. Males had a median income of $25,417 versus $19,167 for females. The per capita income for the township was $14,020. About 13.0% of families and 13.8% of the population were below the poverty line, including 21.9% of those under the age of eighteen and 19.4% of those 65 or over.
