= Sugar Bush Township, Becker County, Minnesota =

Sugar Bush Township, Minnesota
- Township
- Location of Sugar Bush Township, within Becker County, Minnesota

- Location within the state of Minnesota Sugar Bush Township, Minnesota (the United States)
- Coordinates: 47°2′16″N 95°39′10″W
- Country: United States
- State: Minnesota
- County: Becker

Area
  - Total: 72.6 sq mi (188.1 km^{2})
  - Land: 65.3 sq mi (169.1 km^{2})
  - Water: 7.3 sq mi (19.0 km^{2})
- Elevation: 1,490 ft (454 m)

Population (2020)
  - Total: 537
  - Density: 8.22/sq mi (3.18/km^{2})
- Time zone: UTC-6 (Central (CST))
  - Summer (DST): UTC-5 (CDT)
- FIPS code: 27-63256
- GNIS feature ID: 0665732

Sugar Bush Township is a township in Becker County, Minnesota, United States. The population was 537 as of the 2020 census.

== Geography ==
According to the United States Census Bureau, the township has a total area of 72.6 square miles (188.1 km^{2}), of which 65.3 square miles (169.1 km^{2}) is land and 7.3 square miles (19.0 km^{2}) (10.11%) is water.

=== Lakes ===
- Bear Lake
- Big Sugar Bush Lake
- Big Tamarack Lake
- Birch Lake (east edge)
- Blackberry Lake
- Bow-Dodge Lake (east quarter)
- Buffalo Lake (east edge)
- Bullhead Lake
- Bush Lake
- Carman Lake
- Chippewa Lake (northwest edge)
- Eagen Lake
- Fish Lake
- Flat Lake (north half)
- Ice Cracking Lake (west edge)
- Island Lake (east half)
- Island Lake (vast majority)
- Little Flat Lake
- Little Round Lake (northeast edge)
- Little Sugar Bush Lake
- Little Tamarack Lake
- Lost Lake
- Lower Egg Lake
- Mallard Lake (east three-quarters)
- Mill Lake
- Mud Lake
- Mulari Lake
- N Momb Lake (northeast three-quarters)
- Pine Lake
- Raspberry Lake (vast majority)
- Round Lake (west edge)
- Rush Lake
- Spindler Lake
- Squaw Lake
- Strawberry Lake (south quarter)
- Tee Cracking Lake (west three-quarters)
- Twin Lakes
- Upper Egg Lake
- Waboose Lake

=== Adjacent townships ===
- Eagle View Township (northeast)
- Round Lake Township (east)
- Height of Land Township (southeast)
- Holmesville Township (southwest)
- Richwood Township (southwest)
- Callaway Township (west)
- Maple Grove Township (northwest)
- White Earth Township (northwest)

=== Cemeteries ===
The township contains these two cemeteries: Aura and Strawberry Lake Mennonite.

== Demographics ==
As of the census of 2000, there were 537 people, 176 households, and 140 families residing in the township. The population density was 8.2 people per square mile (3.2/km^{2}). There were 319 housing units at an average density of 4.9/sq mi (1.9/km^{2}). The racial makeup of the township was 65.92% White, 26.82% Native American, and 7.26% from two or more races. Hispanic or Latino of any race were 1.68% of the population.

There were 176 households, out of which 39.2% had children under the age of 18 living with them, 65.3% were married couples living together, 8.0% had a female householder with no husband present, and 19.9% were non-families. 18.8% of all households were made up of individuals, and 9.1% had someone living alone who was 65 years of age or older. The average household size was 3.05 and the average family size was 3.43.

In the township the population was spread out, with 34.8% under the age of 18, 5.8% from 18 to 24, 25.1% from 25 to 44, 20.7% from 45 to 64, and 13.6% who were 65 years of age or older. The median age was 36 years. For every 100 females, there were 106.5 males. For every 100 females age 18 and over, there were 110.8 males.

The median income for a household in the township was $25,500, and the median income for a family was $31,023. Males had a median income of $23,929 versus $18,333 for females. The per capita income for the township was $11,486. About 22.1% of families and 21.8% of the population were below the poverty line, including 28.0% of those under age 18 and 26.2% of those age 65 or over.
