= Hamden Township, Becker County, Minnesota =

Hamden Township, Minnesota
- Township
- Location of Hamden Township, within Becker County, Minnesota

- Location within the state of Minnesota Hamden Township, Minnesota (the United States)
- Coordinates: 46°57′3″N 95°59′44″W
- Country: United States
- State: Minnesota
- County: Becker

Area
  - Total: 35.4 sq mi (91.8 km^{2})
  - Land: 34.0 sq mi (88.0 km^{2})
  - Water: 1.5 sq mi (3.8 km^{2})
- Elevation: 1,240 ft (378 m)

Population (2020)
  - Total: 212
  - Density: 6.24/sq mi (2.41/km^{2})
- Time zone: UTC-6 (Central (CST))
  - Summer (DST): UTC-5 (CDT)
- FIPS code: 27-26684
- GNIS feature ID: 0664378

Hamden Township is a township in Becker County, Minnesota, United States. The population was 212 as of the 2020 census.

== Geography ==
According to the United States Census Bureau, the township has a total area of 35.5 square miles (92 km^{2}), of which 34.0 square miles (88 km^{2}) is land and 1.5 square miles (3.9 km^{2}) (4.15%) is water.

=== Lakes ===
- Bay Lake
- Boe Lake
- Cravath Lake (north half)
- Hamden Lake
- Hoefendahl Lake
- Larson Lake
- Pearce Lake
- Seabold Lake

=== Adjacent townships ===
- Riceville Township (north)
- Callaway Township (northeast)
- Richwood Township (east)
- Detroit Township (southeast)
- Audubon Township (south)
- Lake Park Township (southwest)
- Cuba Township (west)

=== Cemeteries ===
The township contains these two cemeteries: Larson and Saron Lutheran.

== Demographics ==
As of the census of 2000, there were 220 people, 81 households, and 61 families residing in the township. The population density was 6.5 inhabitants per square mile (2.5/km^{2}). There were 86 housing units at an average density of 2.5 per square mile (0.97/km^{2}). The racial makeup of the township was 95.91% White, 1.36% Native American, and 2.73% from two or more races.

There were 81 households, out of which 29.6% had children under the age of 18 living with them, 69.1% were married couples living together, 1.2% had a female householder with no husband present, and 23.5% were non-families. 18.5% of all households were made up of individuals, and 6.2% had someone living alone who was 65 years of age or older. The average household size was 2.72 and the average family size was 3.10.

In the township the population was spread out, with 25.9% under the age of 18, 9.1% from 18 to 24, 22.3% from 25 to 44, 32.7% from 45 to 64, and 10.0% who were 65 years of age or older. The median age was 40 years. For every 100 females, there were 129.2 males. For every 100 females age 18 and over, there were 126.4 males.

The median income for a household in the township was $43,333, and the median income for a family was $44,583. Males had a median income of $31,818 versus $21,875 for females. The per capita income for the township was $19,353. About 4.5% of families and 6.9% of the population were below the poverty line, including 10.2% of those under the age of eighteen and 4.5% of those 65 or over.
