= Cuba Township, Becker County, Minnesota =

Cuba Township, Minnesota
- Township
- Location of Cuba Township, within Becker County, Minnesota

- Location within the state of Minnesota Cuba Township, Minnesota (the United States)
- Coordinates: 46°55′22″N 96°5′41″W
- Country: United States
- State: Minnesota
- County: Becker

Area
  - Total: 35.6 sq mi (92.1 km^{2})
  - Land: 34.2 sq mi (88.5 km^{2})
  - Water: 1.4 sq mi (3.6 km^{2})
- Elevation: 1,250 ft (381 m)

Population (2020)
  - Total: 297
  - Density: 8.69/sq mi (3.36/km^{2})
- Time zone: UTC-6 (Central (CST))
  - Summer (DST): UTC-5 (CDT)
- FIPS code: 27-14230
- GNIS feature ID: 0663904

Cuba Township is a township in Becker County, Minnesota, United States. The population was 297 as of the 2020 census.

== History ==
Cuba Township was organized in 1872. It was named for Cuba, New York, the former hometown of the early settler Charles W. Smith.

== Geography ==
According to the United States Census Bureau, the township has a total area of 35.5 square miles (92 km^{2}), of which 34.2 square miles (89 km^{2}) is land and 1.4 square miles (3.6 km^{2}) (3.88%) is water.

The north edge of the city of Lake Park is within this township geographically but is a separate entity.

=== Lakes ===
- Cuba Lake (northeast quarter)
- Duck Lake
- La Belle Lake (vast majority)
- Lime Lake (northeast quarter)
- Stinking Lake

=== Adjacent townships ===
- Atlanta Township (north)
- Riceville Township (northeast)
- Hamden Township (east)
- Audubon Township (southeast)
- Lake Park Township (south)
- Eglon Township, Clay County (southwest)
- Highland Grove Township, Clay County (west)

=== Cemeteries ===
The township contains these three cemeteries: Baarstad, Lake Park and Swedish Lutheran.

== Demographics ==
As of the census of 2000, there were 208 people, 87 households, and 64 families residing in the township. The population density was 6.1 inhabitants per square mile (2.4/km^{2}). There were 90 housing units at an average density of 2.6 per square mile (1.0/km^{2}). The racial makeup of the township was 99.52% White and 0.48% African American. Hispanic or Latino of any race were 0.48% of the population.

There were 87 households, out of which 26.4% had children under the age of 18 living with them, 65.5% were married couples living together, 3.4% had a female householder with no husband present, and 25.3% were non-families. 23.0% of all households were made up of individuals, and 10.3% had someone living alone who was 65 years of age or older. The average household size was 2.39 and the average family size was 2.80.

In the township the population was spread out, with 19.2% under the age of 18, 6.7% from 18 to 24, 28.4% from 25 to 44, 23.6% from 45 to 64, and 22.1% who were 65 years of age or older. The median age was 44 years. For every 100 females, there were 136.4 males. For every 100 females age 18 and over, there were 124.0 males.

The median income for a household in the township was $39,167, and the median income for a family was $49,375. Males had a median income of $27,500 versus $20,417 for females. The per capita income for the township was $19,991. About 4.8% of families and 6.4% of the population were below the poverty line, including 6.5% of those under the age of eighteen and 3.8% of those 65 or over.
