= Big Sugar Bush Lake =

Lake in the state of Minnesota, United States

- Location within Minnesota
- Location: Becker County, Minnesota
- Coordinates: 47°2′22″N 95°46′45″W
- Type: lake

Big Sugar Bush Lake is a lake in Becker County, Minnesota, in the United States.

Big Sugar Bush Lake was named for the maple trees used by Native Americans to produce syrup.

== See also ==
- List of lakes in Minnesota
