= Home Lake Township, Norman County, Minnesota =

Home Lake Township, Minnesota
- Township
- Location of Home Lake Township, within Norman County, Minnesota
- Coordinates: 47°11′58″N 96°16′10″W
- Country: United States
- State: Minnesota
- County: Norman

Area
  - Total: 36.1 sq mi (93.4 km^{2})
  - Land: 35.9 sq mi (93.0 km^{2})
  - Water: 0.15 sq mi (0.4 km^{2})
- Elevation: 1,106 ft (337 m)

Population (2020)
  - Total: 107
  - Density: 2.98/sq mi (1.15/km^{2})
- Time zone: UTC-6 (Central (CST))
  - Summer (DST): UTC-5 (CDT)
- FIPS code: 27-29996
- GNIS feature ID: 0664513

Home Lake Township is a township in Norman County, Minnesota, United States. The population was 107 at the 2020 census.

== History ==
Home Lake Township was organized in 1881, and named after its Home Lake.

== Geography ==
According to the United States Census Bureau, the township has a total area of 36.0 square miles (93 km^{2}), of which 35.9 square miles (93 km^{2}) is land and 0.2 square miles (0.52 km^{2}) (0.42%) is water.

== Demographics ==
As of the census of 2000, there were 184 people, 66 households, and 55 families residing in the township. The population density was 5.1 inhabitants per square mile (2.0/km^{2}). There were 69 housing units at an average density of 1.9 per square mile (0.73/km^{2}). The racial makeup of the township was 93.48% White, 1.09% Native American, 0.54% Asian, and 4.89% from two or more races. Hispanic or Latino of any race were 1.09% of the population.

There were 66 households, out of which 39.4% had children under the age of 18 living with them, 74.2% were married couples living together, 3.0% had a female householder with no husband present, and 15.2% were non-families. 13.6% of all households were made up of individuals, and 4.5% had someone living alone who was 65 years of age or older. The average household size was 2.79 and the average family size was 3.07.

In the township the population was spread out, with 31.0% under the age of 18, 3.8% from 18 to 24, 25.0% from 25 to 44, 27.7% from 45 to 64, and 12.5% who were 65 years of age or older. The median age was 38 years. For every 100 females, there were 97.8 males. For every 100 females age 18 and over, there were 108.2 males.

The median income for a household in the township was $40,417, and the median income for a family was $40,750. Males had a median income of $25,833 versus $20,500 for females. The per capita income for the township was $15,358. About 16.7% of families and 9.6% of the population were below the poverty line, including none of those under the age of eighteen or sixty five or over.
