= Home Lake =

Lake in the state of Minnesota, United States

- Location within Minnesota
- Location: Norman County, Minnesota
- Coordinates: 47°12′17″N 96°12′33″W
- Type: lake

Home Lake is a lake in Norman County, in the U.S. state of Minnesota.

Home Lake derives its name from the surname of John Homelvig, a county official.
