= Bullhead Lake (Otter Tail County, Minnesota) =

Lake in the state of Minnesota, United States

- Location within Minnesota Location within the United States
- Location: Otter Tail County, Minnesota
- Coordinates: 46°15′37″N 95°36′36″W
- Type: Lake
- Surface elevation: 1,342 feet (409 m)

Bullhead Lake is a lake in Otter Tail County, in the U.S. state of Minnesota.

Bullhead Lake was named after the bullhead catfish in its waters.

== See also ==
- List of lakes in Minnesota
