= Bullhead Lake (Watonwan County, Minnesota) =

Lake in the state of Minnesota, United States

- Location within Minnesota Location within the United States
- Location: Watonwan County, Minnesota
- Coordinates: 43°57′20″N 94°33′49″W
- Surface elevation: 1,066 feet (325 m)

Bullhead Lake is a lake in Watonwan County, in the U.S. state of Minnesota.

Bullhead Lake was so named for its stock of bullhead catfish.

== See also ==
- List of lakes in Minnesota
