= Ulen Township, Clay County, Minnesota =

Township in Minnesota, United States

Ulen Township
- Township
- Location of Ulen Township, within Clay County, Minnesota

- Location within the state of Minnesota Ulen Township (the United States)
- Coordinates: 47°6′1″N 96°14′53″W
- Country: United States
- State: Minnesota
- County: Clay

Area
  - Total: 35.2 sq mi (91.2 km^{2})
  - Land: 35.2 sq mi (91.2 km^{2})
  - Water: 0 sq mi (0.0 km^{2})
- Elevation: 1,142 ft (348 m)

Population (2020)
  - Total: 173
  - Density: 4.91/sq mi (1.90/km^{2})
- Time zone: UTC-6 (Central (CST))
  - Summer (DST): UTC-5 (CDT)
- ZIP code: 56585
- Area code: 218
- FIPS code: 27-66154
- GNIS feature ID: 0665836

Ulen Township is a township in Clay County, Minnesota, United States. The population was 173 at the 2020 census.

Ulen Township was named for Ole Ulen, a Norwegian immigrant and pioneer settler.

== Geography ==
According to the United States Census Bureau, the township has a total area of 35.2 square miles (91.2 km^{2}), all land.

== Demographics ==
As of the census of 2000, there were 163 people, 61 households, and 45 families residing in the township. The population density was 4.6 people per square mile (1.8/km^{2}). There were 70 housing units at an average density of 2.0/sq mi (0.8/km^{2}). The racial makeup of the township was 96.93% White, 0.61% African American, 0.61% Native American, 0.61% Asian, 0.61% from other races, and 0.61% from two or more races. Hispanic or Latino of any race were 1.84% of the population.

There were 61 households, out of which 37.7% had children under the age of 18 living with them, 65.6% were married couples living together, 3.3% had a female householder with no husband present, and 24.6% were non-families. 18.0% of all households were made up of individuals, and 8.2% had someone living alone who was 65 years of age or older. The average household size was 2.67 and the average family size was 3.11.

In the township the population was spread out, with 30.1% under the age of 18, 5.5% from 18 to 24, 32.5% from 25 to 44, 22.1% from 45 to 64, and 9.8% who were 65 years of age or older. The median age was 36 years. For every 100 females, there were 114.5 males. For every 100 females age 18 and over, there were 128.0 males.

The median income for a household in the township was $37,500, and the median income for a family was $40,357. Males had a median income of $32,750 versus $21,250 for females. The per capita income for the township was $14,318. About 11.4% of families and 21.3% of the population were below the poverty line, including 25.5% of those under the age of eighteen and 25.0% of those 65 or over.
