= Dunn Township, Otter Tail County, Minnesota =

Dunn Township, Minnesota
- Township
- Location of Dunn Township, within Otter Tail County, Minnesota

- Location within the state of Minnesota Dunn Township, Minnesota (the United States)
- Coordinates: 46°41′8″N 95°58′55″W
- Country: United States
- State: Minnesota
- County: Otter Tail

Area
  - Total: 36.6 sq mi (94.9 km^{2})
  - Land: 26.2 sq mi (67.9 km^{2})
  - Water: 10.4 sq mi (27.0 km^{2})
- Elevation: 1,325 ft (404 m)

Population (2020)
  - Total: 929
  - Density: 35.4/sq mi (13.7/km^{2})
- Time zone: UTC-6 (Central (CST))
  - Summer (DST): UTC-5 (CDT)
- FIPS code: 27-17162
- GNIS feature ID: 0664011
- Website: https://dunntownship.com/

Dunn Township is a township in Otter Tail County, Minnesota, United States. The population was 929 at the 2020 census.

== History ==
Dunn Township was organized in 1880, and named for George W. Dunn, a settler.

== Geography ==
According to the United States Census Bureau, the township has a total area of 36.6 square miles (95 km^{2}), of which 26.2 square miles (68 km^{2}) is land and 10.4 square miles (27 km^{2}) (28.49%) is water.

== Demographics ==
At the 2000 census there were 855 people, 388 households, and 287 families living in the township. The population density was 32.6 inhabitants per square mile (12.6/km^{2}). There were 1,491 housing units at an average density of 56.9 per square mile (22.0/km^{2}). The racial makeup of the township was 99.77% White, 0.12% from other races, and 0.12% from two or more races. Hispanic or Latino of any race were 0.23%.

Of the 388 households 19.8% had children under the age of 18 living with them, 69.6% were married couples living together, 2.6% had a female householder with no husband present, and 26.0% were non-families. 22.7% of households were one person and 9.3% were one person aged 65 or older. The average household size was 2.20 and the average family size was 2.54.

The age distribution was 17.7% under the age of 18, 3.3% from 18 to 24, 19.4% from 25 to 44, 37.8% from 45 to 64, and 21.9% 65 or older. The median age was 51 years. For every 100 females, there were 109.6 males. For every 100 females age 18 and over, there were 105.2 males.

The median household income was $41,618 and the median family income was $47,143. Males had a median income of $33,438 versus $21,827 for females. The per capita income for the township was $25,247. About 4.1% of families and 7.9% of the population were below the poverty line, including 7.3% of those under age 18 and 13.8% of those age 65 or over.
