= Lake Grove Township, Mahnomen County, Minnesota =

Lake Grove Township, Minnesota
- Township
- Location of Lake Grove Township, within Mahnomen County, Minnesota

- Location within the state of Minnesota Lake Grove Township, Minnesota (the United States)
- Coordinates: 47°12′16″N 95°51′33″W
- Country: United States
- State: Minnesota
- County: Mahnomen

Area
  - Total: 36.3 sq mi (94.1 km^{2})
  - Land: 34.9 sq mi (90.4 km^{2})
  - Water: 1.4 sq mi (3.7 km^{2})
- Elevation: 1,283 ft (391 m)

Population (2020)
  - Total: 171
  - Density: 4.90/sq mi (1.89/km^{2})
- Time zone: UTC-6 (Central (CST))
  - Summer (DST): UTC-5 (CDT)
- FIPS code: 27-34424
- GNIS feature ID: 0664677

Lake Grove Township is a township in Mahnomen County, Minnesota, United States. The population was 171 at the 2020 census.

Lake Grove Township was named for the lakes and groves within its borders.

== Geography ==
According to the United States Census Bureau, the township has a total area of 36.3 square miles (94 km^{2}), of which 34.9 square miles (90 km^{2}) of it is land and 1.4 square miles (3.6 km^{2}) of it (3.94%) is water.

== Demographics ==
As of the census of 2000, there were 203 people, 74 households, and 56 families residing in the township. The population density was 5.8 inhabitants per square mile (2.2/km^{2}). There were 81 housing units at an average density of 2.3 per square mile (0.89/km^{2}). The racial makeup of the township was 76.85% White, 7.88% Native American, and 15.27% from two or more races. Hispanic or Latino of any race were 0.99% of the population.

There were 74 households, out of which 28.4% had children under the age of 18 living with them, 60.8% were married couples living together, 2.7% had a female householder with no husband present, and 23.0% were non-families. 18.9% of all households were made up of individuals, and 9.5% had someone living alone who was 65 years of age or older. The average household size was 2.74 and the average family size was 3.04.

In the township the population was spread out, with 28.1% under the age of 18, 4.9% from 18 to 24, 21.2% from 25 to 44, 31.0% from 45 to 64, and 14.8% who were 65 years of age or older. The median age was 41 years. For every 100 females, there were 109.3 males. For every 100 females age 18 and over, there were 117.9 males.

The median income for a household in the township was $30,417, and the median income for a family was $34,583. Males had a median income of $17,321 versus $21,071 for females. The per capita income for the township was $14,439. About 3.3% of families and 11.3% of the population were below the poverty line, including 21.6% of those under the age of eighteen and 9.5% of those 65 or over.
