= Cormorant Township, Becker County, Minnesota =

Township in the United States

Cormorant Township, Minnesota
- Township
- Nickname: Cormorant Village
- Motto: "The Heart of the Cormorant Lake Area"
- Location of Cormorant Township, within Becker County, Minnesota

- Location within the state of Minnesota Cormorant Township, Minnesota (the United States)
- Country: United States
- State: Minnesota
- County: Becker

Government
  - Mayor: Khaleesi Sherbrooke

Area
  - Total: 36.3 sq mi (93.9 km^{2})
  - Land: 26.3 sq mi (68.2 km^{2})
  - Water: 9.9 sq mi (25.7 km^{2})

Population (2020)
  - Total: 1,388
  - Density: 52.7/sq mi (20.4/km^{2})
- FIPS code: 27-13294
- GNIS feature ID: 0663873
- Website: www.cormoranttownship.org

Cormorant Township is a township in Becker County, Minnesota, United States. The population was 1,388 as of the 2020 census.

== Geography ==
According to the United States Census Bureau, the township has a total area of 36.3 square miles (93.9 km^{2}), of which 26.3 square miles (68.2 km^{2}) is land and 9.9 square miles (25.7 km^{2}), or 27.40%, is water.

== Demographics ==
As of the census of 2000, there were 965 people, 422 households, and 316 families residing in the township. The population density was 36.6 inhabitants per square mile (14.1/km^{2}). There were 977 housing units at an average density of 37.1 per square mile (14.3/km^{2}). The racial makeup of the township was 98.86% White, 0.21% African American, 0.10% Native American, 0.31% Asian, and 0.52% from two or more races. Hispanic or Latino of any race were 0.41% of the population.

There were 422 households, out of which 20.1% had children under the age of 18 living with them, 69.2% were married couples living together, 2.6% had a female householder with no husband present, and 25.1% were non-families. 20.9% of all households were made up of individuals, and 8.1% had someone living alone who was 65 years of age or older. The average household size was 2.29 and the average family size was 2.63.

In the township the population was spread out, with 17.3% under the age of 18, 3.8% from 18 to 24, 22.2% from 25 to 44, 34.3% from 45 to 64, and 22.4% who were 65 years of age or older. The median age was 49 years. For every 100 females, there were 106.2 males. For every 100 females age 18 and over, there were 106.7 males.

The median income for a household in the township was $47,560, and the median income for a family was $54,444. Males had a median income of $41,635 versus $28,125 for females. The per capita income for the township was $24,016. About 1.6% of families and 4.7% of the population were below the poverty line, including 5.8% of those under age 18 and 1.8% of those age 65 or over.

== Media attention ==
In 2014, a Great Pyrenees dog named Duke won the annual election for the ceremonial mayorship of Cormorant. Twelve votes were cast. He won his fourth consecutive term in May 2017. Mayor Duke retired in 2018 and died in 2019. In 2024, another Great Pyrenees named Khaleesi became the new mayor, beating out YouTuber “Ken Matthees” from the channel “CBOYSTV.”

== Bibliography ==
- United States National Atlas
- United States Census Bureau 2007 TIGER/Line Shapefiles
- United States Board on Geographic Names (GNIS)
