= Popple Grove Township, Mahnomen County, Minnesota =

Popple Grove Township, Minnesota
- Township
- Location of Popple Grove Township, within Mahnomen County, Minnesota

- Location within the state of Minnesota Popple Grove Township, Minnesota (the United States)
- Coordinates: 47°11′42″N 95°59′11″W
- Country: United States
- State: Minnesota
- County: Mahnomen

Area
  - Total: 37.5 sq mi (97.0 km^{2})
  - Land: 37.3 sq mi (96.6 km^{2})
  - Water: 0.12 sq mi (0.3 km^{2})
- Elevation: 1,240 ft (378 m)

Population (2020)
  - Total: 138
  - Density: 3.70/sq mi (1.43/km^{2})
- Time zone: UTC-6 (Central (CST))
  - Summer (DST): UTC-5 (CDT)
- FIPS code: 27-52054
- GNIS feature ID: 0665341

Popple Grove Township is a township in Mahnomen County, Minnesota, United States. The population was 138 at the 2020 census.

Popple Grove Township was named for its groves of poplar.

== Geography ==
According to the United States Census Bureau, the township has a total area of 37.5 square miles (97.0 km^{2}), of which 37.3 square miles (96.6 km^{2}) of it is land and 0.1 square miles (0.3 km^{2}) of it (0.35%) is water.

== Demographics ==
As of the census of 2000, there were 154 people, 53 households, and 41 families residing in the township. The population density was 4.1 people per square mile (1.6/km^{2}). There were 59 housing units at an average density of 1.6/sq mi (0.6/km^{2}). The racial makeup of the township was 82.47% White, 13.64% Native American, and 3.90% from two or more races.

There were 53 households, out of which 43.4% had children under the age of 18 living with them, 58.5% were married couples living together, 9.4% had a female householder with no husband present, and 22.6% were non-families. 18.9% of all households were made up of individuals, and 9.4% had someone living alone who was 65 years of age or older. The average household size was 2.91 and the average family size was 3.29.

In the township the population was spread out, with 33.8% under the age of 18, 3.9% from 18 to 24, 26.6% from 25 to 44, 20.8% from 45 to 64, and 14.9% who were 65 years of age or older. The median age was 34 years. For every 100 females, there were 126.5 males. For every 100 females age 18 and over, there were 117.0 males.

The median income for a household in the township was $37,500, and the median income for a family was $40,313. Males had a median income of $22,083 versus $21,250 for females. The per capita income for the township was $15,011. None of the families and 2.9% of the population were living below the poverty line, including no under eighteens and 8.3% of those over 64.
