= Hobart Township, Otter Tail County, Minnesota =

Hobart Township, Minnesota
- Township
- Location of Hobart Township, within Otter Tail County, Minnesota

- Location within the state of Minnesota Hobart Township, Minnesota (the United States)
- Coordinates: 46°39′43″N 95°43′35″W
- Country: United States
- State: Minnesota
- County: Otter Tail

Area
  - Total: 36.0 sq mi (93.2 km^{2})
  - Land: 28.8 sq mi (74.5 km^{2})
  - Water: 7.2 sq mi (18.6 km^{2})
- Elevation: 1,350 ft (410 m)

Population (2020)
  - Total: 798
  - Density: 27.7/sq mi (10.7/km^{2})
- Time zone: UTC-6 (Central (CST))
  - Summer (DST): UTC-5 (CDT)
- FIPS code: 27-29420
- GNIS feature ID: 0664488
- Website: https://www.hobartmn.gov/

Hobart Township is a township in Otter Tail County, Minnesota, United States. The population was 798 at the 2020 census.

Hobart Township was organized in 1871.

== Geography ==
According to the United States Census Bureau, the township has a total area of 36.0 square miles (93 km^{2}), of which 28.8 square miles (75 km^{2}) is land and 7.2 square miles (19 km^{2}) (20.02%) is water.

== Demographics ==
As of the census of 2000, there were 733 people, 291 households, and 222 families living in the township. The population density was 25.5 inhabitants per square mile (9.8/km^{2}). There were 637 housing units at an average density of 22.1 per square mile (8.5/km^{2}). The racial makeup of the township was 99.05% White, 0.41% African American and 0.55% Asian. Hispanic or Latino of any race were 0.14% of the population.

There were 291 households, out of which 26.8% had children under the age of 18 living with them, 69.8% were married couples living together, 3.1% had a female householder with no husband present, and 23.7% were non-families. 19.9% of all households were made up of individuals, and 7.6% had someone living alone who was 65 years of age or older. The average household size was 2.51 and the average family size was 2.89.

In the township the population was spread out, with 21.6% under the age of 18, 6.3% from 18 to 24, 23.6% from 25 to 44, 32.5% from 45 to 64, and 16.1% who were 65 years of age or older. The median age was 44 years. For every 100 females, there were 113.7 males. For every 100 females age 18 and over, there were 112.2 males.

The median income for a household in the township was $42,115, and the median income for a family was $44,167. Males had a median income of $30,938 versus $17,679 for females. The per capita income for the township was $18,614. About 4.1% of families and 6.9% of the population were below the poverty line, including 4.3% of those under age 18 and 9.3% of those age 65 or over.
