= Northern Star Council =

Scouting organization in Minnesota and Wisconsin

- Owner: Scouting America
- Headquarters: St. Paul, Minnesota
- Location: 6202 Bloomington Road Fort Snelling, Minnesota
- Country: United States
- Founded: 2005
- President: Paul Kaus
- Council Commissioner: Nick Pedersen
- Scout Executive: Jeff Sulzbach
- Website http://www.northernstar.org/

Northern Star Council is a Scouting America Council headquartered in Fort Snelling, Minnesota. The organization is currently branded and more commonly known as Northern Star Scouting. Northern Star Scouting was formerly the Viking Council and Indianhead Council until the two councils merged on July 1, 2005. It serves communities across the Minneapolis–Saint Paul area, central Minnesota, western Wisconsin, Duluth, and northern Minnesota, encompassing 30 counties.

== History ==
The Viking Council was founded on October 15, 1910, as the Minneapolis Council. In 1952, the name was changed to Viking Council. At the time of the merger with Indianhead Council, the geography of the Viking Council spanned from Minneapolis to the South Dakota border. Other camps from the Viking Council included Stearns Scout Camp in Fair Haven Township, Minnesota and Rum River Scout Camp in Anoka, Minnesota. A history of patches used by the Viking Council and Minneapolis Council is available at the Viking Council Patch Archive.

The Indianhead Council was founded on October 1, 1910, as the St. Paul Council. In 1954, the name was changed to Indianhead Council. The Indianhead Council was headquartered in Saint Paul, Minnesota, and included Ramsey, Dakota County, and Washington Counties in Minnesota, and four counties in western Wisconsin. Facilities included an office building in Saint Paul, Tomahawk Scout Camp near Rice Lake, Wisconsin, Phillippo Scout Camp near Cannon Falls, Minnesota, Andersen Scout Camp near Hudson, Wisconsin, and Kiwanis Scout Camp near Marine on St. Croix, Minnesota.

In 2024, Voyageurs Area Council merged with Northern Star Council.

A flowchart of the history of these councils is depicted below:

Minneapolis #289 founded 1915	St. Paul #295 founded 1915
Hennepin County #289 name changed 1922	Ramsey County #295 name changed 1924-25
Minneapolis Area #289 name changed 1928	St. Paul Area #295 name changed 1929
St. Paul Area #295 merged 1946
Viking #289 name changed 1951	Indianhead #295 name changed 1955
Northern Star #250 merged 2005

Northfield #292 founded 1916

Faribault #288 founded 1921
Faribault #288 merged 1925
Rice-Scott-Le Sueur Area #288 name changed 1926
South Central Minnesota #288 name changed 1929

New Prague #291 founded 1921

== Organization ==
Northern Star Scouting is divided into districts to better administer Scouting within geographic, specialty and cultural communities.

=== Geographic ===
District	Sampling of Communities Served
District E	Amery School District, Baldwin-Woodville Area SD, Clear Lake School District, Ellsworth Community School District, Frederic School District, Glenwood City School District, Hudson School District, Luck School District, New Richmond School District, Osceola School District, Plum City School District, Prescott School District, River Falls School District, Somerset School District, Spring Valley School District, St. Croix Central School District, St. Croix Falls School District, Unity School District, Webster School District
District F	Cambridge-Isanti PSD, Centennial Public School District, Chisago Lakes School District, Forest Lake Public School District, North Branch Public Schools, Rush City Public School District, St. Francis Public School District
District G	Inver Grove Heights Schools, Mahtomedi Public School District, South St. Paul Public School District, South Washington County SD, Stillwater Area Public School District
District H	North St. Paul-Maplewood-Oakdale SD, Roseville Public School District, White Bear Lake School District
District I	St. Paul Public School District
District J	Anoka-Hennepin PSD, Buffalo-Hanover-Montrose PS, Elk River Public School District, Fridley Public School District, Monticello Public School District, Spring Lake Park Public Schools, St. Michael-Albertville School District
District K	Edina Public School District, Hopkins Public School District, Osseo Public School District, Robbinsdale Public School District, St. Louis Park Public School District, Brooklyn Center Public School District
District L	Columbia Heights PSD, Minneapolis Public School District, Mounds View Public School District, St. Anthony-New Brighton Schools
District M	Central Public School District Delano Public School District, Eastern Carver County Public Schools, Glencoe-Silver Lake School District, Minnetonka Public School District, Orono Public School District, Rockford Public School District, Waconia Public School District, Watertown-Mayer Public School District, Wayzata Public School District, Westonka Public School District
District N	Bloomington Public School District, Burnsville Public School District, Eden Prairie Public School District, Prior Lake-Savage Area Schools, Richfield Public School District, Shakopee Public School District
District O	Hastings Public School District, Rosemount-Apple Valley-Eagan, West St. Paul-Mendota Heights-Eagan
District P	Belle Plaine Public School District, Faribault Public School District, Farmington Public School District, Jordan Public School District, Lakeville Public School District, Le Sueur-Henderson School District, New Prague Area Schools, Northfield Public School District, Randolph Public School District, Tri-City United School District, Waterville-Elysian-Morristown PSD
District Q	A.C.G.C. Public School District, Annandale Public School District, Bird Island-Olivia-Lake Lillian PSD, Buffalo Lake-Hector-Stewart PS, Canby Public School District, Dassel-Cokato Public School District, Dawson-Boyd Public School District, Eden Valley-Watkins School District, Howard Lake-Waverly-Winsted, Hutchinson Public School District, Kimball Public School District, Lac qui Parle Valley School District, Litchfield Public School District, MACCRAY School District, Maple Lake Public School District, Montevideo Public School District, New London-Spicer School District, Renville County West School District, Willmar Public School District, Yellow Medicine East

== Neighboring councils ==
The following councils neighbor Northern Star Council.

Council	Headquarter city
North	
Central Minnesota	Sartell, MN
Northern Lights	Fargo, ND
South	
Gamehaven	Rochester, MN
Sioux	Sioux Falls, SD
Twin Valley	Mankato, MN
East	
Chippewa Valley	Eau Claire, WI
West	
Sioux	Sioux Falls, SD

== Camps ==
Northern Star Council camps (click on markers for Geohack maps)

Northern Star Scouting currently operates eight camps.

Camp name	Camp location	Size	Website
Base Camp	Fort Snelling, MN	6 acres (2.4 ha)	Website
Andersen Scout Camp	Houlton, WI	260 acres (110 ha)	Website
Kiwanis Scout Camp	Marine on St. Croix, MN	110 acres (45 ha)	Website
Many Point Scout Camp	Ponsford, MN	2,400 acres (970 ha)	Website
Phillippo Scout Camp	Cannon Falls, MN	450 acres (180 ha)	Website
Rum River Scout Camp	Anoka, MN	160 acres (65 ha)	Website
Stearns Scout Camp	South Haven, MN	1,200 acres (490 ha)	Website
Tomahawk Scout Camp	Birchwood, WI	3,300 acres (1,300 ha)	Website

=== Tomahawk Scout Camp ===
Tomahawk Scout Camp
- Location: Birchwood, Wisconsin
- Founded: 1953
- Website http://www.camptomahawk.org

Tomahawk Scout Camp is located near Rice Lake, Wisconsin. It sits on the shores of Long Lake, on which the camp owns several miles of shoreline. The camp encompasses approximately 3,000 acres (1,200 ha), and is the largest camp operated by Northern Star Council.

Tomahawk is made up of four sub-camps: Chippewa, Sioux, White Pine, and Arrow of Light.

==== History ====
Tomahawk began with Indianhead Council purchasing 1,932 acres (782 ha) of land on February 14, 1953, from businessman Aksel Nielsen.

=== Many Point Scout Camp ===
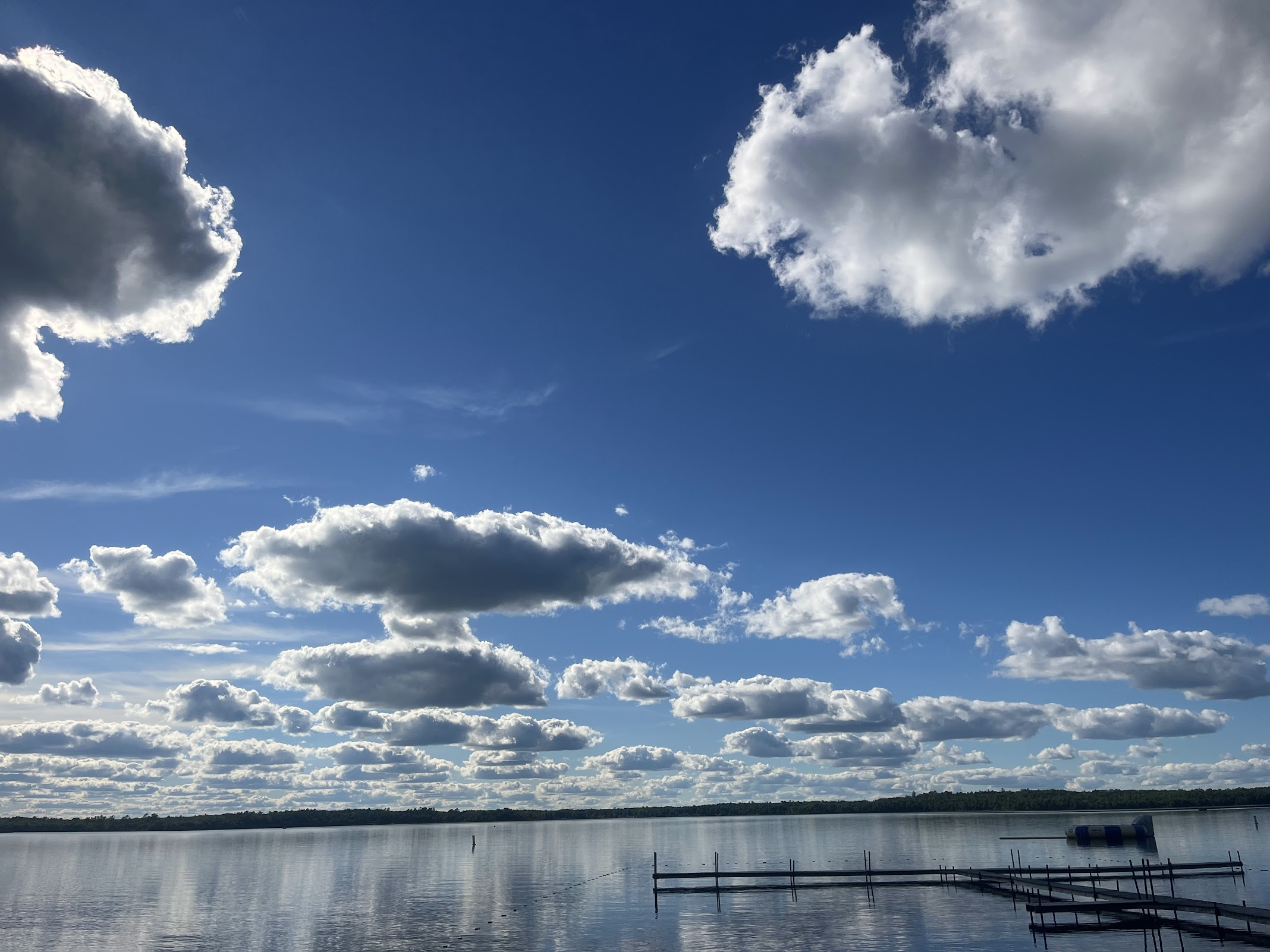
View of glassy water on Lake Many Point from Ten Chiefs sub-camp at Many Point Scout Camp, Ponsford, MN.

Many Point Scout Camp
- Location: Ponsford, Minnesota
- Coordinates: 47.097806°N 95.476926°W
- Founded: 1946
- Website http://www.manypoint.org/

Many Point Scout Camp is a Scout summer camp located along Many Point Lake on the White Earth Indian Reservation near the township of Ponsford in Becker County, Minnesota. The camp is currently the second largest Scout camp operated by the Northern Star Council, is composed of approximately 1,669 acres (675 ha), and borders the 43,000-acre (17,000 ha) Tamarac National Wildlife Refuge. Many Point is further divided into six sub-camps which serve troops, Venturing crews and families.

==== History ====
The first occupants of Many Point Lake and its surroundings were Native Americans of the Ojibwa tribe, who gave the lake its name for its many peninsulas. In the 19th century, the lake and woods which surrounded it were occupied by French fur traders and loggers, who harvested the abundant natural resources.

Many Point Scout Camp was founded in 1946 by Wint Hartman, the first camping director for the camp, and Boots Hanson, the first camp ranger. Wint's initial idea for the camp was that Scouts would come with their troops and be guided by principles such as leave no trace. This was a new idea for the BSA, as up until this time Scouts went to camp by themselves, and camps were much more paramilitary. Many Point Scout Camp was the first BSA camp to accommodate troops instead of just individual Scouts.

During the winter of 1946–1947, Boots Hanson lived alone on land purchased from the Many Point Gun and Rod club, what is today the Buckskin sub-camp. He spent the winter readying the land for Scouts. In the spring, when Wint Hartman drove up from the cities wondering if camp would be ready, he saw a red lantern hanging in Hanson's window, a sign that camp was ready. To this day, a red lantern is one of the symbols for Many Point. During the summer, lit red lanterns are hung outside of each sub-camp's lodge, as a sign that the camp is there for the Scouts. In the winter, red lanterns are placed in the windows of the rangers' homes.

As time went on and more land was obtained, new sub-camps were opened and additions were made to the camp. Today it is made up of a main administration area, three program camps for troop camping, a high adventure base, a camp with no staff or program for troops who wish to run their own program, as well as a camp for families.

Some of the staff have noted what seems to be a sunken bridge of some sort on part of the lake. They believe that over time, the lake began to fill with more water, causing this structure to collapse. They notice that the surrounding area is swampy, leading them to note that the loggers may have built a bridge over the swamp.

==== Geography ====
Many Point Scout Camp is made up of roughly 1,700 acres (690 ha) of woodland and swamp along over 6 mi (9.7 km) of shoreline on Many Point Lake, Round Lake to the south, and a few small lakes to the east. The camp is located on the White Earth Band of Ojibwe reservation, bordering the 43,000-acre (17,000 ha) Tamarac National Wildlife Refuge.

==== Main Area ====
The administration area is located a short drive into the camp, and is where troops check in at the start of their session. The area houses the administration building, which includes a lounge for staff, also used by counselors-in-training (CITs) on weekends. The Many Point History Center and fire tower are also located here. A few minutes away by foot is the camp maintenance shop and CIT base camp, also called CIT Hill.

==== Camps ====
Many Point is made up of four sub-camps, which are Buckskin, Ten Chiefs, Voyager and Pioneer. Many Point also has a family camp, where Scouting families may stay for the week. Preference is given to those families that have a Scout attending Many Point that same week. Family Camp includes a full program led by camp staff, 21 cabins, and 8 tenting sites. Many Point is also home to Flintlock, a high adventure base serving Scouts staying in Buckskin, Ten Chiefs, and Voyageur.

Buckskin

Buckskin is the oldest sub-camp within Many Point, and is a short walk from the administration area. Troops that camp in Buckskin stay in one of 13 troop sites, each containing multiple patrol sites. There is also a site called All Star, where Scouts, may come independent from troops.

Buckskin is unique from the other camps for its dining hall, where Scouts and staff are fed, and therefore not required to cook their own food. The sub-camp is home to one of Many Point's three climbing towers and one of three 25-foot (7.6 m) water trampolines.

Ten Chiefs

Ten Chiefs is about 2 mi (3.2 km) south of Buckskin and the Administration areas, and is the second of the three sub-camps that troops use. Much like Buckskin, troops stay in one of 13 troop sites, but unlike Buckskin must do their own cooking, except for dinner, which is delivered from the commissary. The second of the three climbing towers and water trampolines are located within Ten Chiefs.

Voyageur

Voyageur is the third sub-camp used for troop camping and is just over 2 mi (3.2 km) south of Ten Chiefs. Voyageur has 13 campsites, and like Ten Chiefs troops must cook their own meals. The third climbing tower, as well as the third water trampoline, are both located within Voyageur.

Flintlock

Flintlock is unique from each of the other sub-camps as, instead of being composed of troop sites and activity areas, it serves as Many Point's high adventure base. Located about 1 mi (1.6 km) north of Voyageur and 1 mi (1.6 km) south of Ten Chiefs, older Scouts from each sub-camp may sign up for a day activity or overnight trip to the programs offered in each tier of activity. Flintlock and parts of southern Ten Chiefs are located in the camp's fabled Yeti Swamp which claims to be the home of the camp's legendary yeti.

Flintlock's activities are divided into three different tiers of adventure.

Tier One comprises activities where older Scouts (8th grade and above) from each sub-camp may sign up for a day activity or overnight trip to one of the camp's two Project COPE courses, the tree houses, or Huck Finn Rafts and also participate in International Target Sports Outpost and Adventure Cove.

Tier Two comprises trek style activities where older Scouts (9th grade and above) are able to participate in adventures outside of Many Point or higher adventure activities. They offer an 11-mile (18 km) kayak trek down the Otter Tail River, two mountain bike treks at the Maplelag Resort and Itasca State Park, a multi-modal trek through the Beaver Lake chain nearby, and most recently an all-terrain vehicle day ride.

Tier Three is reserved for specialty week long programs offered through Flintlock High Adventure Base. Two programs are offered every week of camp, and others are offered on a specialty one or two week opportunity throughout the summer. Water Sports Outpost and Older Scout Adventure Blast are offered each week, where Water Sports Outpost allows older Scouts to ride personal watercraft and water ski or wake-board and Older Scout Adventure Blast offers all-terrain vehicle riding and mornings of Tier One Activities. The specialty programs are titled All-Things weeks and offer a full week of SCUBA, Aquatics, Wilderness Response, or Sportsman activities.

Also at Flintlock is the new Frontier program. Located across the bay from Buckskin and only accessible by boat, Flintlock staff and interested troops are helping to build a replica of an 1860s logging camp, the Thompson-Peake Lumber Company, that used to be on Many Point Lake.

Pioneer

Pioneer is located along the southwest shore of Many Point Lake, between Voyageur and Family Camp. Unfortunately, the sub-camp is no longer in use. However, troops and crews may come to this camp if they wish to make and run their own program with minimal staff interaction.

Family Camp

Family Camp is built on the site of a former resort, on a peninsula that stretches to the center of Many Point Lake. While priority for the cabins and tent sites is given to families of Scouts and Scoutmasters camping at another sub-camp, any family can come and spend a week doing some fun camp activities or relaxing for the entire week. Swimming lessons, arts and crafts, and trips to Itasca State Park are also available. Many Point Family Camp is unique from other BSA family camps as it is one of the only in the nation to run a program for families.

== Former camps ==
In the early days of Scouting, councils did not own properties permanently set aside for camping. Scouts simply met at undeveloped land and set up a temporary camp. However, the need for larger, permanent spaces was recognized.

=== Oak Point (Square Lake) ===
The first property purchased by the then-St. Paul Council was on Oak Point of Square Lake (45.1566°N 92.8035°W) near Stillwater, MN. Established in 1918, it was officially named "Oak Point Camp" but known as "Square Lake Camp" by the campers. It served the council for many years, but became too small for the demand in the 1930s, and was closed in 1937 when it was severely damaged by a storm.

=== Neibel ===
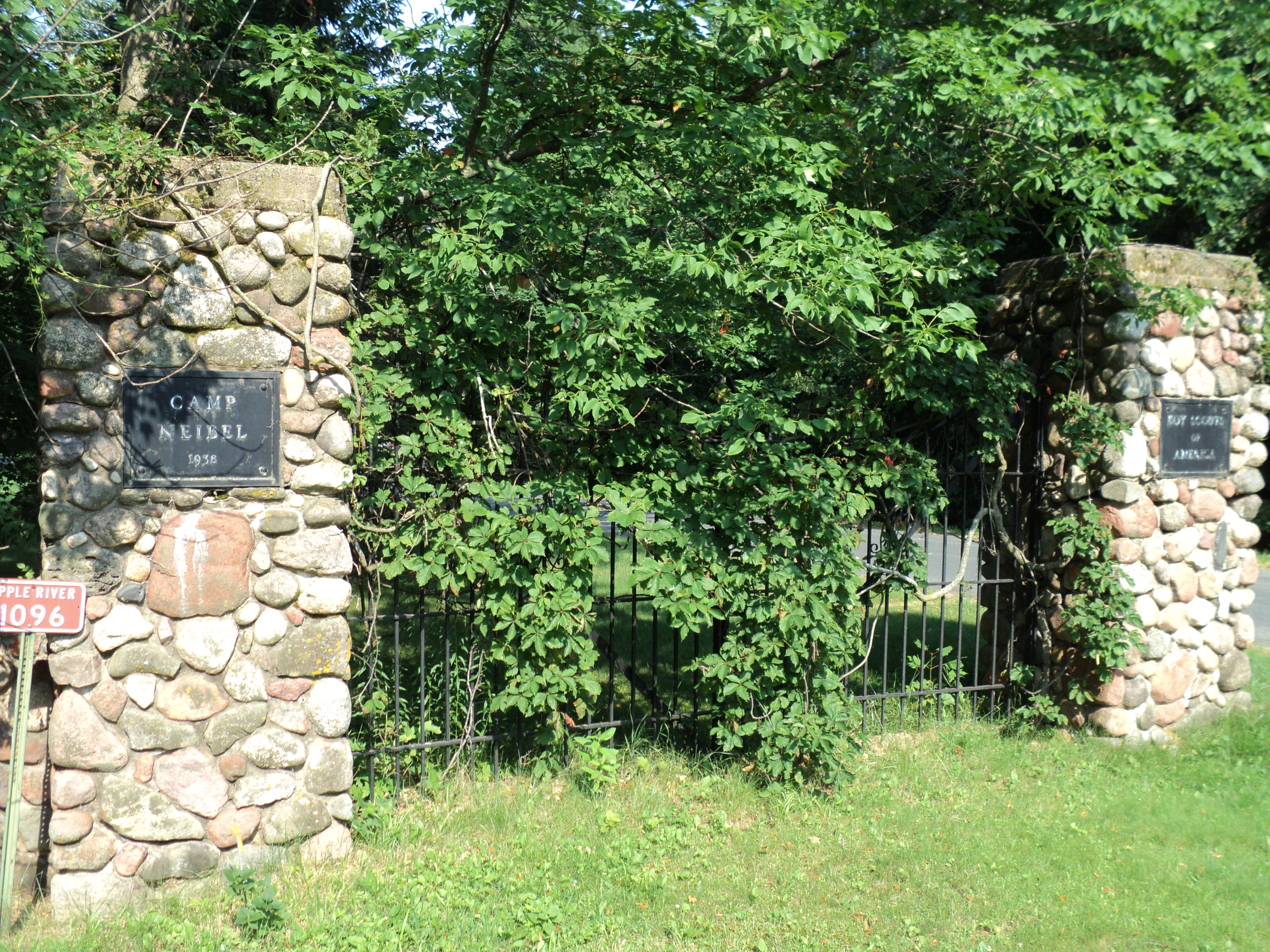
Original entrance to Camp Neibel in 2012

Looking for a larger property, the council purchased 101 acres (41 ha) of land on the eastern shore of Balsam Lake, Wisconsin (45.468459°N 92.388011°W), which was opened as Camp Neibel in the mid-1930s. It was named after Frank Neibel, who was the Scout Executive of the council at the time, and included a small island which was used for camping trips. Eventually, it too was outgrown, and it was closed in 1954, shortly after the land for Camp Tomahawk was purchased. The former Camp Neibel property was subdivided into individual lots, but the original pillars and entrance gate can be seen on the road that still bears the name "Neibel Lane".

== Order of the Arrow ==
The council is served by the Totanhan Nakaha Lodge, which was formed in 2006 after the Viking and Indianhead Councils merged. Its name means "From the Past, A New Beginning". The previous lodges and their origins are depicted below.

Tonkawampus #16 founded 1924	Blue Ox #26 founded 1927
Agaming #257 founded 1944	Tsun-Ga'Ni #144 founded 1939
Agaming #257 absorbed part of Tsun-Ga'Ni 1946	Blue Ox #26 absorbed part of Tsun-Ga'Ni 1946
Blue Ox #26 disbanded 1950
Blue Ox #26 rechartered 1953
Totanhan Nakaha #16 merged 2006

== See also ==
- Scouting in Minnesota
