= Oak Lake, Minnesota =

Ghost town in Minnesota, United States

Coordinates: 46°50′30″N 95°56′18″W

Oak Lake is a ghost town in section 24 of Audubon Township in Becker County, Minnesota, United States.

== History ==
The village of Oak Lake, which was also known as Oak Lake Cut or Oak City, had a station of the Northern Pacific Railroad, located in nearby section 19 of Detroit Township, but it was abandoned in 1872, when a new station was built five miles west in the town of Audubon.
