= National Register of Historic Places listings in Becker County, Minnesota =

Location of Becker County in Minnesota

This is a list of the National Register of Historic Places listings in Becker County, Minnesota. It is intended to be a complete list of the properties and districts on the National Register of Historic Places in Becker County, Minnesota, United States. The locations of National Register properties and districts for which the latitude and longitude coordinates are included below may be seen in an online map.

There are 8 properties and districts listed on the National Register in the county. A supplementary list includes one additional site that was formerly listed on the National Register.

This National Park Service list is complete through NPS recent listings posted August 1, 2025.

== Current listings ==
	Name on the Register	Image	Date listed	Location	City or town	Description
1	Detroit Lakes Carnegie Library	Detroit Lakes Carnegie Library	March 16, 1976 (#76001045)	1000 Washington Ave. 46°48′56″N 95°50′46″W	Detroit Lakes	1913 Prairie School Carnegie library designed by Claude and Starck.
2	Detroit Lakes City Park	Detroit Lakes City Park	May 30, 2008 (#08000466)	Washington Ave. and North Shore Dr. 46°48′24″N 95°50′38″W	Detroit Lakes	Lakeside park established in 1897, noted for its role in the city's social life and tourism industry through such evolving amenities as a swimming beach, dance pavilion, playing fields, and New Deal redevelopments.
3	Edgewater Beach Cottages	Edgewater Beach Cottages	March 15, 1989 (#89000138)	321 Park Lake Blvd. 46°48′14″N 95°50′28″W	Detroit Lakes	The two best-preserved cabins of a 1937 lake resort exhibiting unusual mortared wood construction. Also representative of Detroit Lakes' summer rental cabins and post-Depression recreational development.
4	Graystone Hotel	Graystone Hotel	July 1, 1999 (#99000774)	119 Pioneer St. 46°49′09″N 95°50′45″W	Detroit Lakes	One of northwestern Minnesota's first hotels catering to tourists rather than business travelers, built 1916–17. Unusual for combining urbane accommodations with access to outdoor recreation.
5	Holmes Block	Holmes Block	July 19, 2001 (#01000748)	710-718 Washington Ave. 46°49′08″N 95°50′44″W	Detroit Lakes	Prominent 1892 commercial building with a 1900 addition, representing Detroit Lakes' early mercantile development.
6	Itasca State Park	Itasca State Park	May 7, 1973 (#73000972)	21 mi (34 km) north of Park Rapids off U.S. Route 71; 47°11′38″N 95°13′03″W	Park Rapids	Minnesota's oldest state park, established in 1891. Also significant for its extensive archaeological resources, association with the quest for the Mississippi River headwaters, pioneer sites, and 72 park facilities built 1905–1942 noted for their rustic log construction and association with early park development. Extends into Clearwater and Hubbard Counties.
7	Northern Pacific Passenger Depot	Northern Pacific Passenger Depot	December 20, 1988 (#88002833)	Off U.S. Route 10; 46°49′11″N 95°50′46″W	Detroit Lakes	Prominent 1908 railway station significant for delivering vacationers, supporting Detroit Lakes' tourism-based economy.
8	Homer E. Sargent House	Homer E. Sargent House	December 22, 1988 (#88003005)	1036 Lake Ave. 46°48′52″N 95°50′51″W	Detroit Lakes	1885 summer home, the earliest known in Detroit Lakes, representing the start of the community's tourism industry. Also noted for its Queen Anne architecture.

== Former listing ==
	Name on the Register	Image	Date listed	Date removed	Location	City or town	Description
1	St. Benedict's Mission School		August 24, 1982 (#82002931)	March 20, 2000	County Highway 133	Ogema	Built in 1892, demolished in 1995.

== See also ==
- List of National Historic Landmarks in Minnesota
- National Register of Historic Places listings in Minnesota
