= Tamarac Wilderness =

Wilderness area in Minnesota, United States

- IUCN category Ib (wilderness area)
- Location within the United States
- Location: Becker County, Minnesota, United States
- Nearest city: Elbow Lake, Minnesota
- Coordinates: 47°04′15″N 095°35′43″W
- Area: 2,180 acres (9 km^{2})
- Established: 1976
- Governing body: U.S. Fish and Wildlife Service

The Tamarac Wilderness is a 2,180-acre (9 km^{2}) wilderness area in the U.S. state of Minnesota. Established by the United States Congress in 1976, Tamarac Wilderness is composed primarily of small lakes, wooded potholes, bogs and marshes. The wilderness consists of four sections of the 42,724-acre (173 km^{2}) Tamarac National Wildlife Refuge: three islands in Tamarac Lake totaling about 65 acres (0 km^{2}) in the southwest section, and more than 2,180 acres (9 km^{2}) in the northwest corner.

== Vegetation ==
Much of the wilderness is forested with white pine, maple, red oak, birch, and elm, with an under story of hazelbrush. Portions of the area were logged in the early years of the twentieth century and contain second growth aspen. On the lower, wetter sites of the wilderness, ash, balsam poplar, tamarack, and spruce are common.

== Wildlife ==
A variety of wildlife can be found in the Tamarac Wilderness, including bald eagle, osprey, black bear, ruffed grouse, white-tailed deer, otter, porcupine, fox, beaver, coyote, and timber wolf, as well as numerous passerine birds. Fish found in Tamarac Lake include northern pike, walleye, largemouth bass, black crappie, bluegill, and yellow perch.

== See also ==
- List of U.S. Wilderness Areas
- Wilderness Act
