= Round Lake Township, Becker County, Minnesota =

Round Lake Township, Minnesota
- Township
- Location of Round Lake Township, within Becker County, Minnesota

- Location within the state of Minnesota Round Lake Township, Minnesota (the United States)
- Coordinates: 47°4′4″N 95°31′29″W
- Country: United States
- State: Minnesota
- County: Becker

Area
  - Total: 72.6 sq mi (188.0 km^{2})
  - Land: 64.1 sq mi (165.9 km^{2})
  - Water: 8.5 sq mi (22.0 km^{2})
- Elevation: 1,570 ft (480 m)

Population (2020)
  - Total: 232
  - Density: 3.62/sq mi (1.40/km^{2})
- Time zone: UTC-6 (Central (CST))
  - Summer (DST): UTC-5 (CDT)
- FIPS code: 27-56050
- GNIS feature ID: 0665478

Round Lake Township is a township in Becker County, Minnesota, United States. The population was 232 as of the 2020 census.

== Geography ==
According to the United States Census Bureau, the township has a total area of 72.6 square miles (188.0 km^{2}), of which 64.1 square miles (165.9 km^{2}) is land and 8.5 square miles (22.0 km^{2}) (11.73%) is water.

=== Cities, towns, villages ===
- Elbow Lake (southeast half)
- Pine Point (northwest edge)

=== Major highway ===
- Minnesota State Highway 113

=== Lakes ===
- Aspinwall Lake (northwest edge)
- Beaver Lake
- Big Rush Lake (northwest three-quarters)
- Camp Seven Lake
- Elbow Lake (southeast half)
- Green Water Lake
- Ice Cracking Lake (vast majority)
- Johnson Lake
- Juggler Lake
- Little Bemidji Lake (east edge)
- Many Point Lake (vast majority)
- Moore Lake
- Mud Lake
- Pickerel Lake
- Pike Lake
- Pine Island Lake
- Round Lake (vast majority)
- Tee Cracking Lake (northeast quarter)
- Wilson Lake

=== Adjacent townships ===
- La Prairie Township, Clearwater County (north)
- Forest Township (east)
- Pine Point Township (east)
- Shell Lake Township (south)
- Height of Land Township (southwest)
- Eagle View Township (west)
- Sugar Bush Township (west)
- Little Elbow Township, Mahnomen County (northwest)

== Demographics ==
As of the census of 2000, there were 157 people, 66 households, and 48 families residing in the township. The population density was 2.5 people per square mile (0.9/km^{2}). There were 281 housing units at an average density of 4.4/sq mi (1.7/km^{2}). The racial makeup of the township was 50.96% White, 47.13% Native American, 0.64% from other races, and 1.27% from two or more races. Hispanic or Latino of any race were 1.91% of the population.

There were 66 households, out of which 19.7% had children under the age of 18 living with them, 63.6% were married couples living together, 7.6% had a female householder with no husband present, and 25.8% were non-families. 25.8% of all households were made up of individuals, and 10.6% had someone living alone who was 65 years of age or older. The average household size was 2.38 and the average family size was 2.84.

In the township the population was spread out, with 24.8% under the age of 18, 3.2% from 18 to 24, 19.7% from 25 to 44, 30.6% from 45 to 64, and 21.7% who were 65 years of age or older. The median age was 48 years. For every 100 females, there were 98.7 males. For every 100 females age 18 and over, there were 122.6 males.

The median income for a household in the township was $23,500, and the median income for a family was $34,583. Males had a median income of $20,250 versus $14,167 for females. The per capita income for the township was $12,996. About 10.6% of families and 18.1% of the population were below the poverty line, including 17.6% of those under the age of eighteen and 5.4% of those 65 or over.
