= Hamden Slough National Wildlife Refuge =

National wildlife refuge in Minnesota, United States

- IUCN category IV (habitat/species management area)
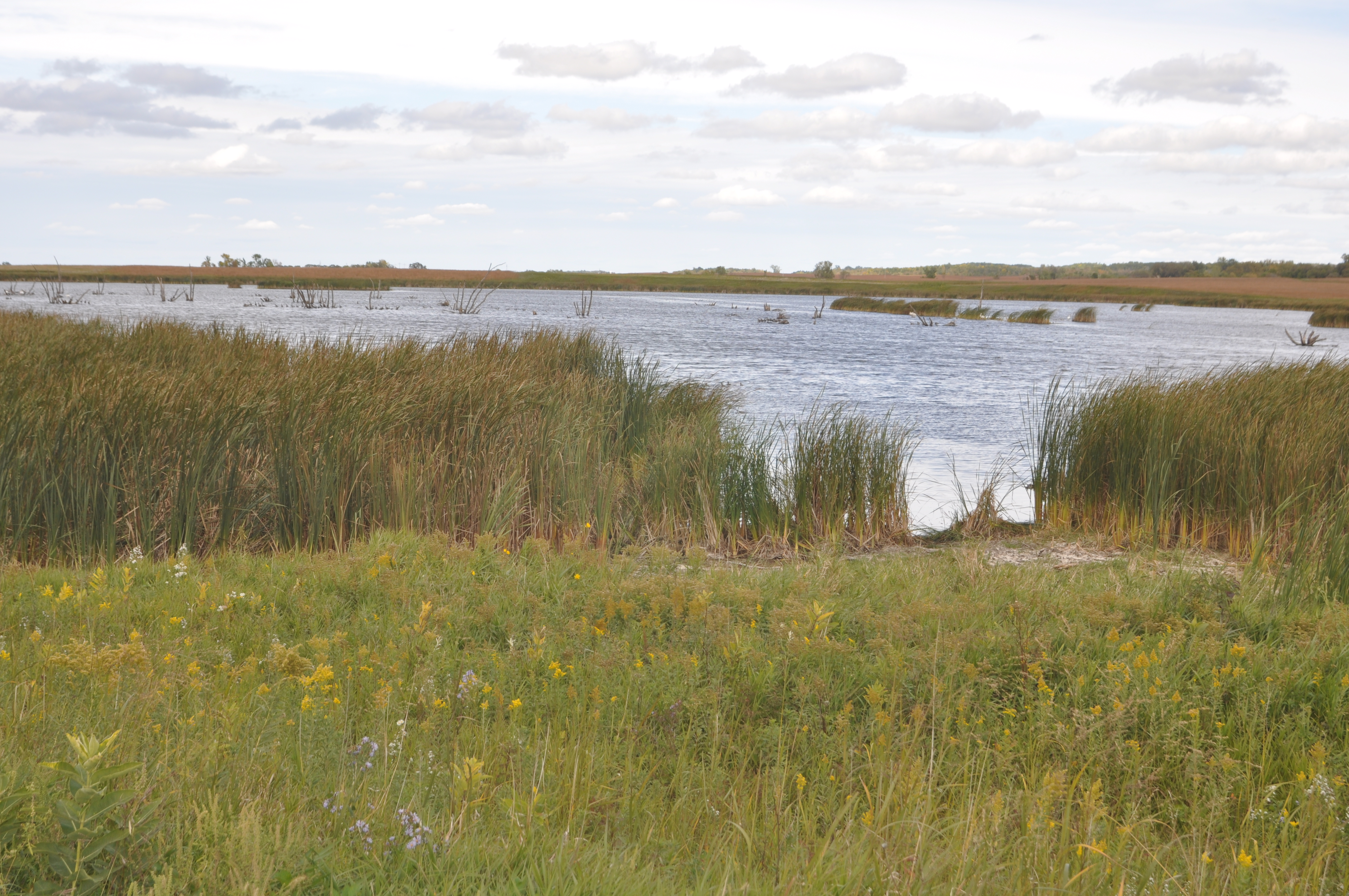

- Location within the United States
- Location: Becker County, Minnesota, United States
- Nearest city: Audubon, Minnesota
- Coordinates: 46.883°N 96.009°W
- Area: 5,944 acres (24.05 km^{2})
- Established: 1989
- Governing body: U.S. Fish and Wildlife Service
- Website: Hamden Slough National Wildlife Refuge

Hamden Slough National Wildlife Refuge is a National Wildlife Refuge of the United States in Minnesota. Eastern hardwood forests stretching from the Atlantic seaboard give way to the western prairie at the area, in Audubon Township, near Audubon, Minnesota. Prior to settlement, its diverse vegetation was attractive to wildlife: waterfowl, upland birds, bison, wolves, and other prairie wildlife. When fully restored, the refuge will provide the largest contiguous block of wetland prairie habitat in the region, encompassing nearly 6,000 acres (24 km^{2}).

The Refuge's objective is to restore 3,000 acres (12 km^{2}) of wetlands and 2,250 acres (9.1 km^{2}) of upland grass. This will provide resting and nesting cover for 219 species of migratory and nesting birds. Currently, waterfowl, shorebirds, neotropical migratory songbirds, and birds of prey rely on the shallow water and prairie habitat that has been restored on the refuge.

Refuge habitat restorations have resulted in an increase in shorebird and prairie songbird populations. This has generated opportunities for wildlife-dependent recreation and serves as an educational model for land and watershed stewardship. Approximately 50% of the private property within the refuge's future boundary has been acquired from willing sellers.

Funding to acquire land and fully develop the refuge's infrastructure is expected to be near $10,000,000. Approximately 15–20 years of work is anticipated to complete the refuge.
