= Bad Medicine =

Bad Medicine may refer to:

== Film and television ==
- Bad Medicine (film), a 1985 film starring Steve Guttenberg
- "Bad Medicine" (Degrassi: The Next Generation), an episode of Degrassi: The Next Generation
- "Bad Medicine" (Homicide: Life on the Street), an episode of Homicide: Life on the Street

== Literature ==
- Bad Medicine (novel), a 2000 novel by Jack Dann
- Bad Medicine (comics), a comic book by Nunzio DeFilippis and Christina Weir
- Bad Medicine, a 2003 nonfiction book by Christopher Wanjek
- Bad Medicine: Doctors Doing Harm Since Hippocrates, a 2006 nonfiction book by David Wootton (historian)
- "Bad Medicine", a short story by Robert Sheckley

== Music ==
- "Bad Medicine" (song), a 1988 song by Bon Jovi

== See also ==
- Bad Medicine Lake, in Minnesota, US
