= Pine Point Township, Becker County, Minnesota =

Pine Point Township, Minnesota Ne-zhingwaakokaansing (Ojibwe)
- Township
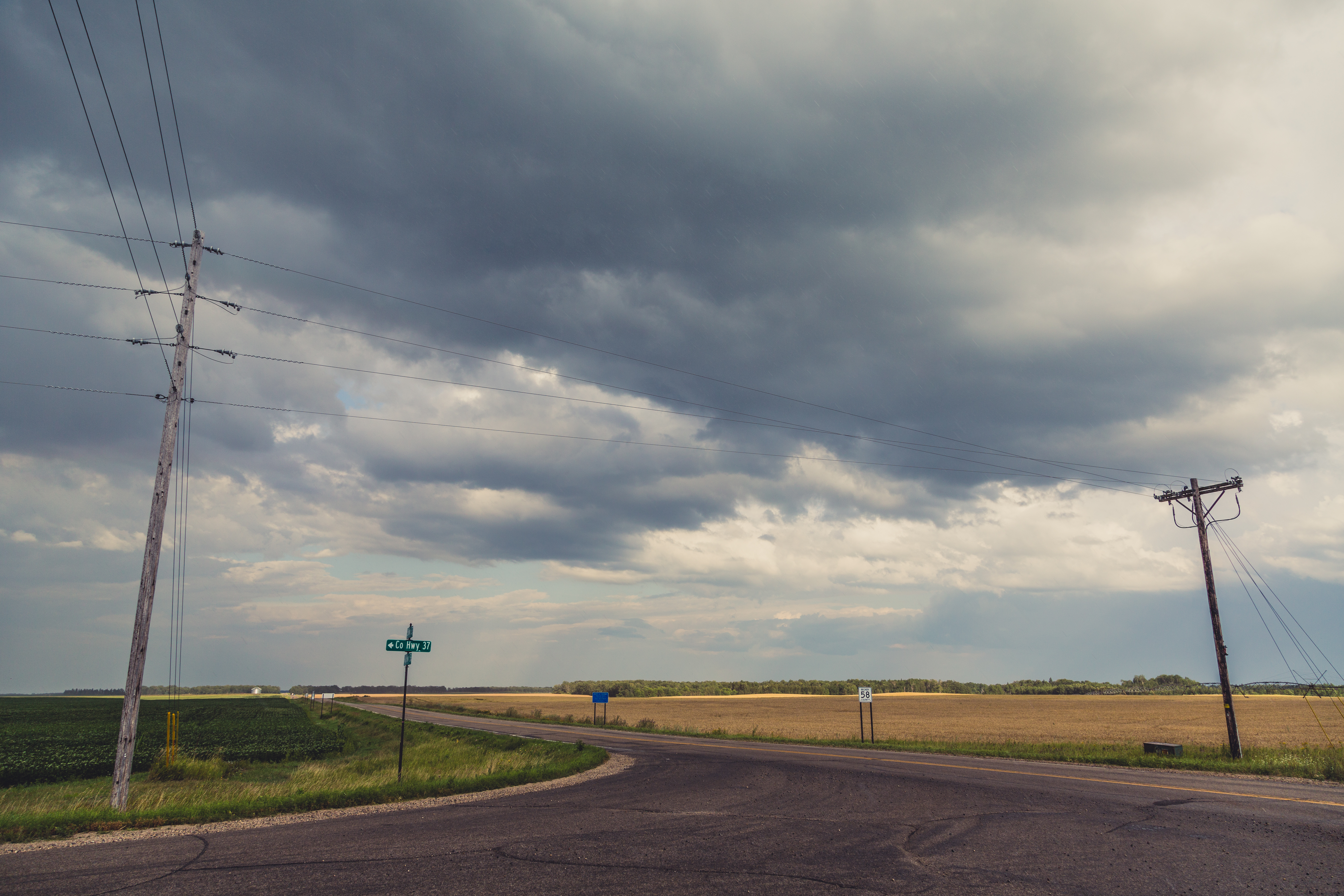
- Junction of Becker County Roads 37 and 58 in Pine Point Township

- Location of Pine Point Township, within Becker County, Minnesota

- Location within the state of Minnesota Pine Point Township, Minnesota (the United States)
- Coordinates: 47°1′14″N 95°22′15″W
- Country: United States
- State: Minnesota
- County: Becker

Area
  - Total: 35.8 sq mi (92.8 km^{2})
  - Land: 34.4 sq mi (89.2 km^{2})
  - Water: 1.4 sq mi (3.6 km^{2})
- Elevation: 1,552 ft (473 m)

Population (2020)
  - Total: 329
  - Density: 9.55/sq mi (3.69/km^{2})
- Time zone: UTC-6 (Central (CST))
  - Summer (DST): UTC-5 (CDT)
- FIPS code: 27-51244
- GNIS feature ID: 0665309

Pine Point Township (Ojibwe: Ne-zhingwaakokaansing) is a township in Becker County, Minnesota, United States. The population was 329 as of the 2020 census.

== Geography ==
According to the United States Census Bureau, the township has a total area of 35.8 square miles (92.8 km^{2}), of which 34.4 square miles (89.2 km^{2}) is land and 1.4 square miles (3.7 km^{2}) (3.93%) is water.

=== Cities, towns, villages ===
- Pine Point (vast majority)

=== Lakes ===
- Aspinwall Lake (vast majority)
- Big Rush Lake (east quarter)
- Mission Lake

=== Adjacent townships ===
- Forest Township (north)
- Savannah Township (northeast)
- Two Inlets Township (east)
- Carsonville Township (south)
- Shell Lake Township (southwest)
- Round Lake Township (west)

=== Cemeteries ===
The township contains these four cemeteries: Breck Memorial, Grand Medicine, Mount Calvary and Saint Theodores.

== Demographics ==
As of the census of 2000, there were 419 people, 132 households, and 111 families residing in the township. The population density was 12.2 people per square mile (4.7/km^{2}). There were 145 housing units at an average density of 4.2/sq mi (1.6/km^{2}). The racial makeup of the township was 23.63% White, 73.75% Native American, and 2.63% from two or more races. Hispanic or Latino of any race were 0.24% of the population.

There were 132 households, out of which 50.8% had children under the age of 18 living with them, 32.6% were married couples living together, 39.4% had a female householder with no husband present, and 15.9% were non-families. 12.9% of all households were made up of individuals, and 3.8% had someone living alone who was 65 years of age or older. The average household size was 3.17, and the average family size was 3.27.

In the township, the population was spread out, with 42.2% under the age of 18, 7.4% from 18 to 24, 25.5% from 25 to 44, 16.0% from 45 to 64, and 8.8% who were 65 years of age or older. The median age was 25 years. For every 100 females, there were 105.4 males. For every 100 females age 18 and over, there were 90.6 males.

The median income for a household in the township was $21,250, and the median income for a family was $21,250. Males had a median income of $30,938 versus $28,036 for females. The per capita income for the township was $9,210. About 33.7% of families and 35.5% of the population were below the poverty line, including 44.3% of those under age 18 and 33.3% of those age 65 or over.
