= Midway, Becker County, Minnesota =

Unincorporated community in Minnesota, US

Midway
- Unincorporated community
- Location within Minnesota Location within the United States
- Coordinates: 46°46′55″N 95°15′37″W
- Country: United States
- State: Minnesota
- County: Becker
- Township: Runeberg
- Elevation: 1,526 ft (465 m)

Population (2011)
  - Total: 10
- Time zone: UTC-6 (Central (CST))
  - Summer (DST): UTC-5 (CDT)
- Area code: 218
- GNIS feature ID: 647823

Midway is an unincorporated community in Runeberg Township, Becker County, Minnesota, United States. Midway is located on County Highway 47, 28 miles (45 km) east of Detroit Lakes. In 2011, the Minnesota Department of Transportation estimated its population to be 10.
