= Eagle View Township, Becker County, Minnesota =

Eagle View Township, Minnesota
- Township
- Location of Eagle View Township, within Becker County, Minnesota

- Location within the state of Minnesota Eagle View Township, Minnesota (the United States)
- Coordinates: 47°7′16″N 95°35′24″W
- Country: United States
- State: Minnesota
- County: Becker

Area
  - Total: 36.3 sq mi (93.9 km^{2})
  - Land: 31.3 sq mi (81.1 km^{2})
  - Water: 4.9 sq mi (12.7 km^{2})
- Elevation: 1,572 ft (479 m)

Population (2020)
  - Total: 186
  - Density: 5.94/sq mi (2.29/km^{2})
- Time zone: UTC-6 (Central (CST))
  - Summer (DST): UTC-5 (CDT)
- FIPS code: 27-17455
- GNIS feature ID: 0664021

Eagle View Township is a township in Becker County, Minnesota, United States. The population was 186 as of the 2020 census.

== Geography ==
According to the United States Census Bureau, the township has a total area of 36.2 square miles (94 km^{2}), of which 31.3 square miles (81 km^{2}) is land and 4.9 square miles (13 km^{2}) (13.55%) is water.

=== Cities, towns, villages ===
- Elbow Lake (west quarter)

=== Lakes ===
- Big Rat Lake (vast majority)
- Elbow Lake (west half)
- Gable Lake
- Horseshoe Lake
- Johnson Lake
- Little Bemidji Lake (vast majority)
- Little Rat Lake (east three-quarters)
- Little Rat Lake (vast majority)
- Little Rice Lake
- Mallard Lake
- Many Point Lake (west edge)
- Tulaby Lake

=== Adjacent townships ===
- Little Elbow Township, Mahnomen County (north)
- La Prairie Township, Clearwater County (northeast)
- Round Lake Township (east)
- Sugar Bush Township (southwest)
- Maple Grove Township (west)
- Oakland Township, Mahnomen County (northwest)

== Demographics ==
As of the census of 2000, there were 165 people, 62 households, and 46 families residing in the township. The population density was 5.3 inhabitants per square mile (2.0/km^{2}). There were 228 housing units at an average density of 7.3 per square mile (2.8/km^{2}). The racial makeup of the township was 35.15% White, 61.82% Native American, and 3.03% from two or more races. Hispanic or Latino of any race were 1.21% of the population.

There were 62 households, out of which 30.6% had children under the age of 18 living with them, 56.5% were married couples living together, 14.5% had a female householder with no husband present, and 24.2% were non-families. 21.0% of all households were made up of individuals, and 8.1% had someone living alone who was 65 years of age or older. The average household size was 2.66 and the average family size was 2.96.

In the township the population was spread out, with 30.9% under the age of 18, 6.1% from 18 to 24, 21.2% from 25 to 44, 27.9% from 45 to 64, and 13.9% who were 65 years of age or older. The median age was 38 years. For every 100 females, there were 91.9 males. For every 100 females age 18 and over, there were 96.6 males.

The median income for a household in the township was $19,318, and the median income for a family was $19,091. Males had a median income of $26,250 versus $15,625 for females. The per capita income for the township was $8,728. About 20.6% of families and 21.7% of the population were below the poverty line, including 25.0% of those under the age of eighteen and 7.1% of those 65 or over.
