= Bad Medicine Lake =

Lake in the state of Minnesota, United States

- Gaa-wiimbaajiwegamaag (Ojibwe)
- Location within Minnesota
- Location: Becker County, Minnesota
- Coordinates: 47°7′40″N 95°24′0″W
- Basin countries: United States
- Max. length: 5 mi (8.0 km)
- Max. width: 0.5 mi (0.80 km)
- Average depth: 10 m (33 ft)
- Max. depth: 90 ft (27 m)

Bad Medicine Lake (Ojibwe: Gaa-wiimbaajiwegamaag) is a spring-fed lake located in Forest Township in Becker County, Minnesota. It got its name from the fact that early Native Americans in the area thought that a lake with neither inlet nor outlet was a place of bad omen ("bad medicine") and would not hunt or fish near the lake.

The lake is approximately five miles long, a half mile wide, and reaches depths of up to 90 feet (27 m). It is known for its clear, cold waters and rainbow trout fishing. It has experienced dramatic changes in its fish habitat and fish community in the last 35 years. Regarded as a bass/panfish lake in the 1950s and 1960s, the lake is now managed primarily for rainbow trout and walleye. The DNR turned Bad Medicine Lake into a trout lake in 1977, following an explosion of native crayfish that eliminated the vegetation used by bass and panfish. Roughly 16,000 rainbow trout are stocked annually, including Kamloops and Madison strains.

There are three active resorts located on the lake: Bad Medicine Resort and Campground, Veronen's Resort and High Pines Resort.

== See also ==
- List of lakes in Minnesota
