= Rochert, Minnesota =

Unincorporated community in Minnesota, US

Rochert
- Unincorporated community
- Location within Minnesota Location within the United States
- Coordinates: 46°51′36″N 95°41′16″W
- Country: United States
- State: Minnesota
- County: Becker
- Elevation: 1,440 ft (440 m)
- Time zone: UTC-6 (Central (CST))
  - Summer (DST): UTC-5 (CDT)
- ZIP code: 56578
- Area code: 218
- GNIS feature ID: 650178

Rochert is an unincorporated community in Becker County, Minnesota, United States. Rochert is 8 miles (13 km) northeast of Detroit Lakes. Rochert has a post office with ZIP code 56578. The settlement was founded by Palm Peter and by Heuters Nikolaus from Rocherath, Belgium.
