= Forest Township, Becker County, Minnesota =

Forest Township, Minnesota
- Township
- Location of Forest Township, within Becker County, Minnesota

- Location within the state of Minnesota Forest Township, Minnesota (the United States)
- Coordinates: 47°7′35″N 95°23′3″W
- Country: United States
- State: Minnesota
- County: Becker

Area
  - Total: 36.0 sq mi (93.2 km^{2})
  - Land: 32.4 sq mi (83.8 km^{2})
  - Water: 3.6 sq mi (9.3 km^{2})
- Elevation: 1,588 ft (484 m)

Population (2020)
  - Total: 172
  - Density: 5.32/sq mi (2.05/km^{2})
- Time zone: UTC-6 (Central (CST))
  - Summer (DST): UTC-5 (CDT)
- FIPS code: 27-21671
- GNIS feature ID: 0664190
- Website: https://www.foresttownshipmn.net/

Forest Township is a township in Becker County, Minnesota, United States. The population was 172 as of the 2020 census.

== Geography ==
According to the United States Census Bureau, the township has a total area of 36.0 square miles (93 km^{2}), of which 32.4 square miles (84 km^{2}) is land and 3.6 square miles (9.3 km^{2}) (10.03%) is water. Bad Medicine Lake and Big Basswood Lake are the two largest lakes in the township.

=== Major highway ===
- Minnesota State Highway 113

=== Lakes ===
- Bad Medicine Lake
- Bass Lake
- Big Basswood Lake
- Equay Lake
- Gardner Lake
- Kneebone Lake
- Little Basswood Lake
- Mallard Lake
- Missouri Lake
- Sockeye Lake

=== Adjacent townships ===
- Long Lost Lake Township, Clearwater County (north)
- Savannah Township (east)
- Two Inlets Township (southeast)
- Pine Point Township (south)
- Round Lake Township (west)
- La Prairie Township, Clearwater County (northwest)

== Demographics ==
As of the census of 2000, there were 58 people, 32 households, and 23 families residing in the township. The population density was 1.8 inhabitants per square mile (0.69/km^{2}). There were 144 housing units at an average density of 4.4 per square mile (1.7/km^{2}). The racial makeup of the township was 100.00% White.

There were 32 households, out of which 3.1% had children under the age of 18 living with them, 71.9% were married couples living together, and 28.1% were non-families. 25.0% of all households were made up of individuals, and 12.5% had someone living alone who was 65 years of age or older. The average household size was 1.81 and the average family size was 2.09.

In the township the population was spread out, with 3.4% under the age of 18, 3.4% from 18 to 24, 5.2% from 25 to 44, 29.3% from 45 to 64, and 58.6% who were 65 years of age or older. The median age was 67 years. For every 100 females, there were 107.1 males. For every 100 females age 18 and over, there were 107.4 males.

The median income for a household in the township was $49,167, and the median income for a family was $36,667. Males had a median income of $81,007 versus $11,250 for females. The per capita income for the township was $30,232. There were 8.3% of families and 6.5% of the population living below the poverty line, including no under eighteens and none of those over 64.
