= Lake Park, Minnesota =

City in Minnesota, United States

Lake Park
- City
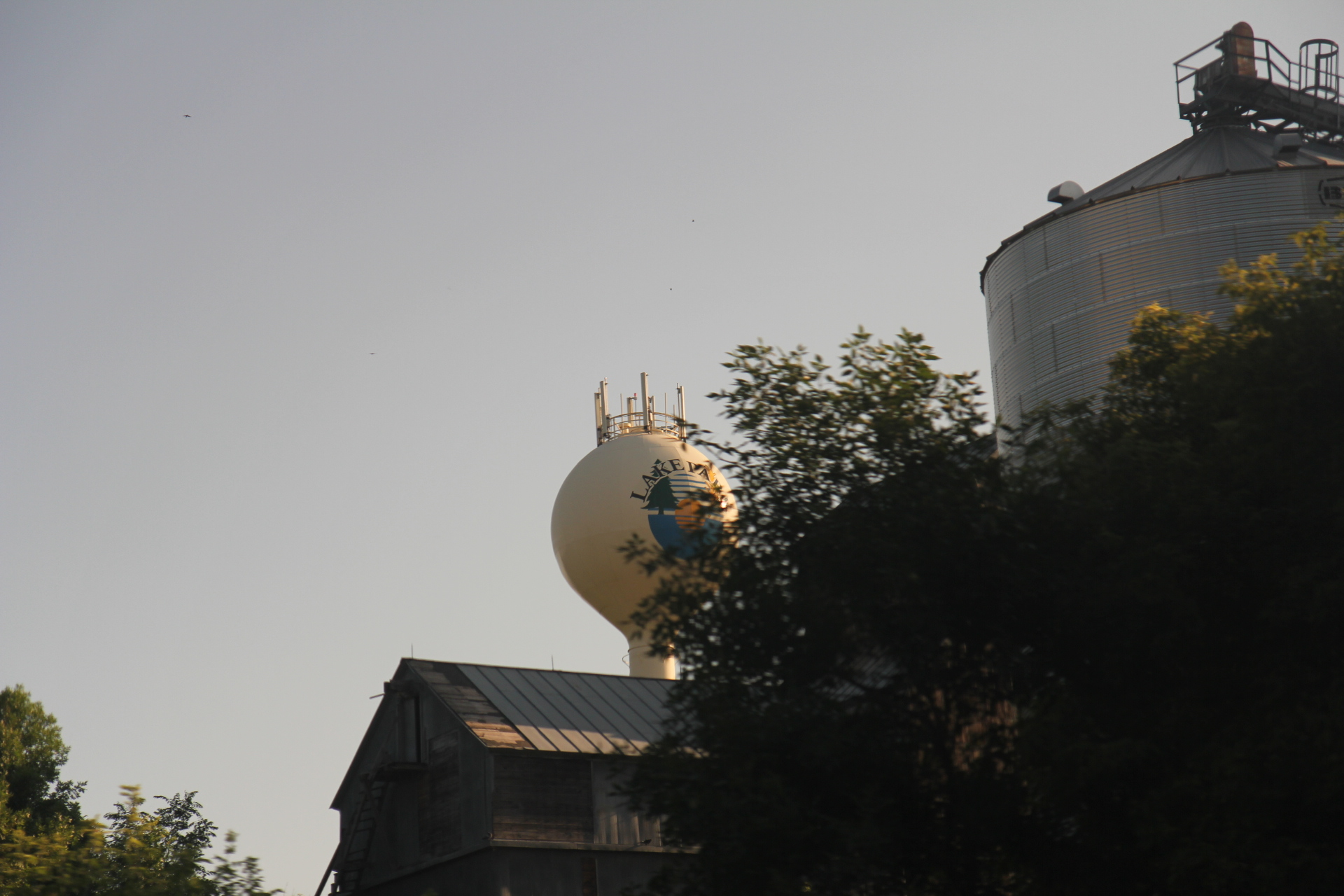
- Water tower

- Seal
- Motto: Gateway to the Lakes
- Location of Lake Park, Minnesota
- Coordinates: 46°53′9″N 96°5′44″W
- Country: United States
- State: Minnesota
- County: Becker

Area
  - Total: 0.96 sq mi (2.49 km^{2})
  - Land: 0.96 sq mi (2.49 km^{2})
  - Water: 0 sq mi (0.00 km^{2})
- Elevation: 1,350 ft (410 m)

Population (2020)
  - Total: 728
  - Estimate (2021): 725
  - Density: 758/sq mi (292.5/km^{2})
- Time zone: UTC-6 (CST)
  - Summer (DST): UTC-5 (CDT)
- ZIP code: 56554
- Area code: 218
- FIPS code: 27-34784
- GNIS feature ID: 0646380
- Website: lakeparkmn.com

Lake Park is a city in Becker County, Minnesota, United States. The population was 728 at the 2020 census.

== History ==
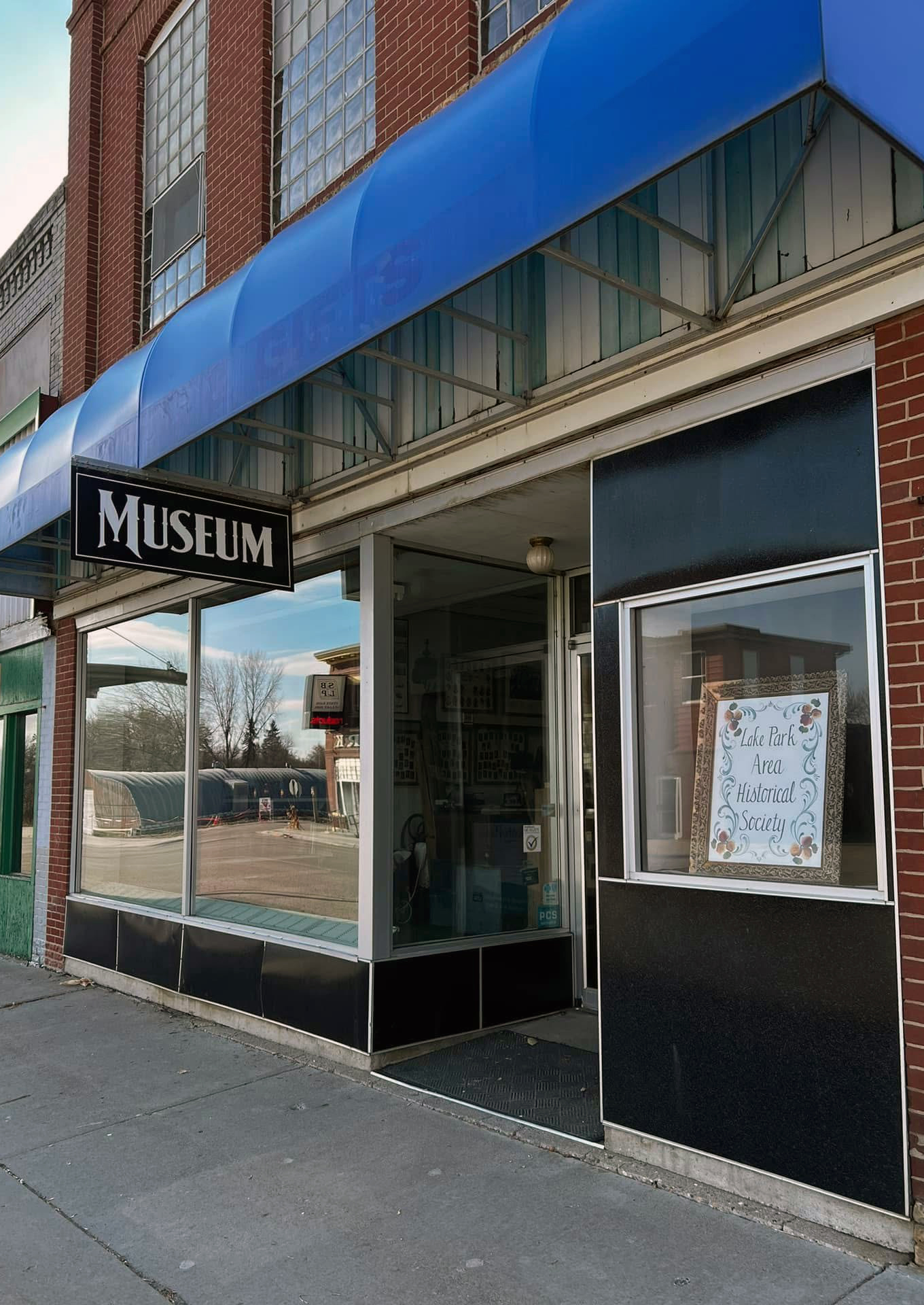
Lake Park Area Historical Society Museum

The area upon where Lake Park was founded, started to be settled in 1841 by fur traders while a Dakota encampment still existed on Lake Flora on which part of the City Park is now located.

The area was originally founded as Liberty Township. In 1871, the Liberty Township Board changed the name to Lake Park Township; for which the name "Lake Park" comes from a Dakota phrase of "Where the Prairies meet the Waters" as the site became a railway stop for the Great Northern Railway by the town founder, James Canfield.

The city was officially incorporated separate from the township on the along the border of Lake Park and Cuba Townships. It was thenceforth known officially as the Village of Lake Park until the 1970s, when Lake Park was converted by the State of Minnesota into a City of the Fourth Class (Population under 5,000), for which it remains today. For many decades, up until the mid-1980s it was also known as the "Lefse Capital of the World" for its lefse factories and their high production, but they came to an end due to a national recession and the loss of regular rail freight service stops in the city. Today, the city is small rebounding family community with an excellent school, new small businesses, and expansion for additional housing.

== Geography ==
According to the United States Census Bureau, the city has a total area of 0.97 square miles (2.51 km^{2}), all land.

Lake Park is located on U.S. Route 10, five miles east of the county line and is southwest of Labelle Lake. The only school in Lake Park is the Lake Park/Audubon high school.

== Demographics ==
Historical population
Census	Pop.	Note	%±
1890	349		—
1900	570		63.3%
1910	740		29.8%
1920	700		−5.4%
1930	624		−10.9%
1940	654		4.8%
1950	689		5.4%
1960	730		6.0%
1970	658		−9.9%
1980	716		8.8%
1990	638		−10.9%
2000	782		22.6%
2010	783		0.1%
2020	728		−7.0%
2021 (est.)	725		−0.4%
U.S. Decennial Census; 2020 Census

=== 2010 census ===
As of the census of 2010, there were 881 people, 316 households, and 216 families residing in the city. The population density was 807.2 inhabitants per square mile (311.7/km^{2}). There were 350 housing units at an average density of 360.8 per square mile (139.3/km^{2}). The racial makeup of the city was 96.3% White, 0.1% African American, 1.9% Native American, 0.3% Asian, and 1.4% from two or more races. Hispanic or Latino of any race were 0.8% of the population.

There were 316 households, of which 39.2% had children under the age of 18 living with them, 47.2% were married couples living together, 13.9% had a female householder with no husband present, 7.3% had a male householder with no wife present, and 31.6% were non-families. 26.3% of all households were made up of individuals, and 12.4% had someone living alone who was 65 years of age or older. The average household size was 2.48 and the average family size was 2.94.

The median age in the city was 35.6 years. 28.6% of residents were under the age of 18; 7.1% were between the ages of 18 and 24; 26.6% were from 25 to 44; 24.9% were from 45 to 64; and 12.9% were 65 years of age or older. The gender makeup of the city was 49.4% male and 50.6% female.

=== 2000 census ===
As of the census of 2000, there were 782 people, 308 households and 198 families residing in the city. The population density was 799.4 inhabitants per square mile (308.7/km^{2}). There were 326 housing units at an average density of 333.2 per square mile (128.6/km^{2}). The racial makeup of the city was 95.91% White, 0.26% African American, 1.28% Native American, 0.38% Asian, and 2.17% from two or more races. Hispanic or Latino of any race were 0.38% of the population.

There were 308 households, of which 38.3% had children under the age of 18 living with them, 48.7% were married couples living together, 10.4% had a female householder with no husband present, and 35.7% were non-families. 31.5% of all households were made up of individuals, and 17.5% had someone living alone who was 65 years of age or older. The average household size was 2.54 and the average family size was 3.22.

Age distribution was 32.0% under the age of 18, 7.4% from 18 to 24, 30.8% from 25 to 44, 15.2% from 45 to 64, and 14.6% who were 65 years of age or older. The median age was 32 years. For every 100 females, there were 98.5 males. For every 100 females age 18 and over, there were 92.8 males.

The median household income was $32,857, and the median family income was $41,250. Males had a median income of $31,048 versus $16,932 for females. The per capita income for the city was $14,307. About 6.8% of families and 10.1% of the population were below the poverty line, including 7.8% of those under age 18 and 19.8% of those age 65 or over.

== Transportation ==
Amtrak’s Empire Builder, which operates between Seattle/Portland and Chicago, passes through the town on BNSF tracks, but makes no stop. The nearest station is located in Detroit Lakes, 13 miles (21 km) to the southeast.

== City Government ==
The City of Lake Park is Minnesota Statutory Plan A City of the Fourth Class governed by a Mayor and City Council. Four council members are elected at-large two every two years to stagger four year terms. One council member is appointed by the Mayor to serve as the Vice-Mayor, and the Mayor or his/her designee also serves as the Emergency Management Director for the City.

The City of Lake Park has retained direct ownership of all its major utilities, except for Telecommunications, instead of choosing to deregulate. Public Utility enterprise funds are utilized for city project funds as well as to keep the property tax method of generating revenue low. In 2015, Broadband was reclassified a minor yet still separate utility; the City of Lake Park has yet to determine whether to add this service to their offerings of public utilities or to franchise it out like other telecommunications to a third-party for a fee, such as Arvig.

== Education ==
Lake Park's school system is combined with that of neighboring Audubon. The high school (7-12) is in Lake Park and the elementary school (1-6) is located in Audubon. The school's mascot is the Raider, a traditional depiction of a Pirate. The former mascot for Lake Park, was the Parker Penguin. The school's current Victory song/cheer has lyrics written by the first High School Principal for the newly formed LPA School District, Ron Fleming's daughter, using the chords from the Notre Dame Victory March.
