= Ogema, Minnesota =

City in Minnesota, United States

Ogema
- City
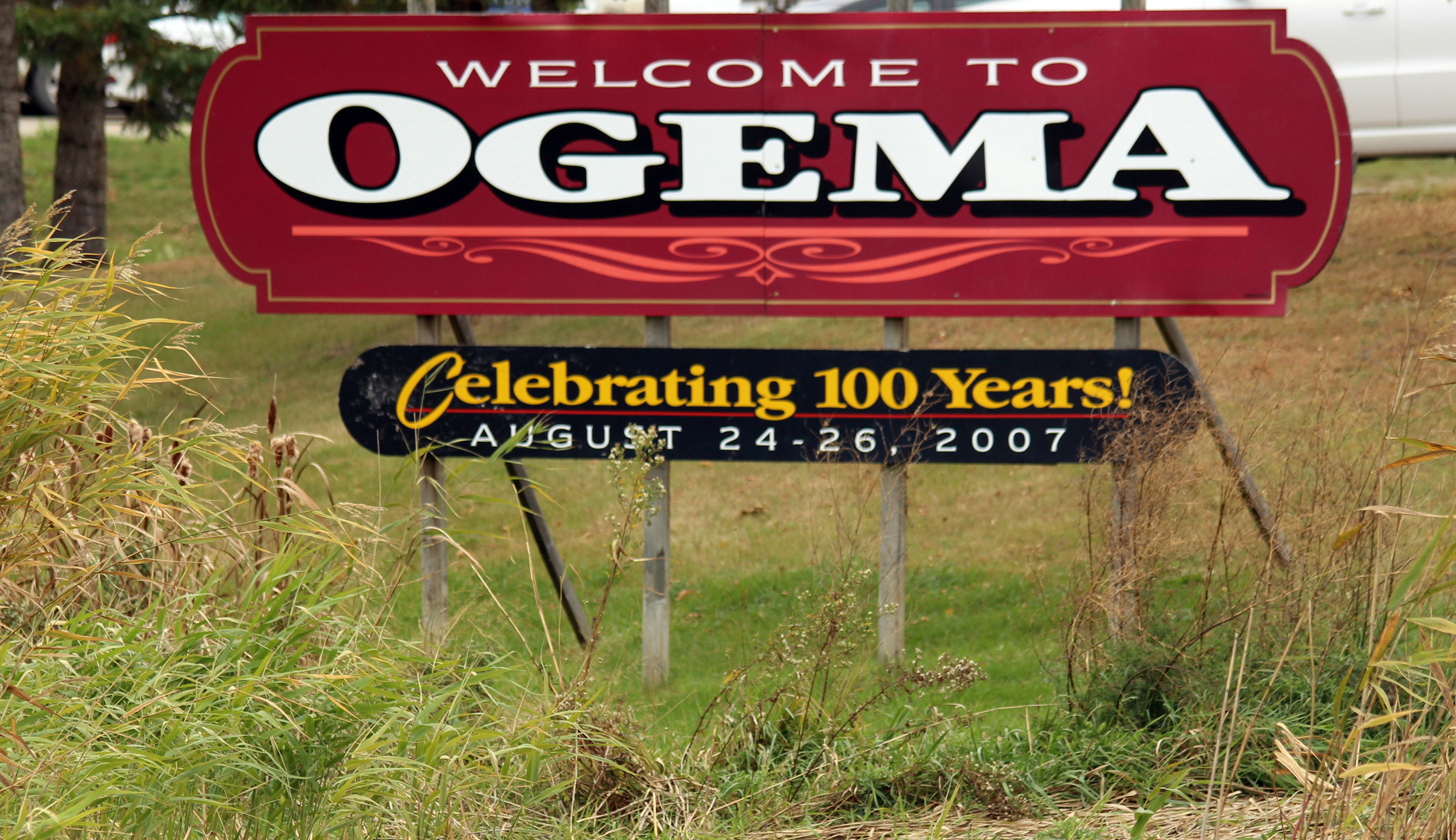
- Welcome sign

- Location of Ogema, Minnesota
- Coordinates: 47°6′14″N 95°55′36″W
- Country: United States
- State: Minnesota
- County: Becker

Area
  - Total: 1.21 sq mi (3.14 km^{2})
  - Land: 1.16 sq mi (3.00 km^{2})
  - Water: 0.050 sq mi (0.13 km^{2})
- Elevation: 1,270 ft (387 m)

Population (2020)
  - Total: 208
  - Estimate (2021): 205
  - Density: 179.4/sq mi (69.26/km^{2})
- Time zone: UTC-6 (CST)
  - Summer (DST): UTC-5 (CDT)
- ZIP code: 56569
- Area code: 218
- FIPS code: 27-48130
- GNIS feature ID: 0648899

Ogema is a city in Becker County, Minnesota, United States. The population was 208 at the 2020 census.

The name Ogema is derived from the Ojibwe language ogimaa, meaning "chief".

== Geography ==
According to the United States Census Bureau, the city has a total area of 1.29 square miles (3.34 km^{2}), of which 1.23 square miles (3.19 km^{2}) is land and 0.06 square miles (0.16 km^{2}) is water.

== Demographics ==
Historical population
Census	Pop.	Note	%±
1910	171		—
1920	238		39.2%
1930	253		6.3%
1940	328		29.6%
1950	249		−24.1%
1960	224		−10.0%
1970	236		5.4%
1980	215		−8.9%
1990	164		−23.7%
2000	143		−12.8%
2010	184		28.7%
2020	208		13.0%
2021 (est.)	205		−1.4%
U.S. Decennial Census; 2020 Census

=== 2010 census ===
As of the census of 2010, there were 184 people, 73 households, and 49 families living in the city. The population density was 149.6 inhabitants per square mile (57.8/km^{2}). There were 84 housing units at an average density of 68.3 per square mile (26.4/km^{2}). The racial makeup of the city was 38.6% White, 46.2% Native American, and 15.2% from two or more races. Hispanic or Latino of any race were 3.3% of the population.

There were 73 households, of which 41.1% had children under the age of 18 living with them, 31.5% were married couples living together, 27.4% had a female householder with no husband present, 8.2% had a male householder with no wife present, and 32.9% were non-families. 28.8% of all households were made up of individuals, and 9.6% had someone living alone who was 65 years of age or older. The average household size was 2.52 and the average family size was 3.04.

The median age in the city was 27.5 years. 37.5% of residents were under the age of 18; 8.2% were between the ages of 18 and 24; 20.6% were from 25 to 44; 22.3% were from 45 to 64; and 11.4% were 65 years of age or older. The gender makeup of the city was 49.5% male and 50.5% female.

=== 2000 census ===
As of the census of 2000, there were 143 people, 62 households, and 32 families living in the city. The population density was 117.5 inhabitants per square mile (45.4/km^{2}). There were 73 housing units at an average density of 60.0 per square mile (23.2/km^{2}). The racial makeup of the city was 60.14% White, 37.06% Native American, 1.40% from other races, and 1.40% from two or more races. Hispanic or Latino of any race were 1.40% of the population.

There were 62 households, out of which 19.4% had children under the age of 18 living with them, 37.1% were married couples living together, 11.3% had a female householder with no husband present, and 46.8% were non-families. 40.3% of all households were made up of individuals, and 25.8% had someone living alone who was 65 years of age or older. The average household size was 2.31 and the average family size was 3.12.

In the city the population was spread out, with 24.5% under the age of 18, 12.6% from 18 to 24, 19.6% from 25 to 44, 22.4% from 45 to 64, and 21.0% who were 65 years of age or older. The median age was 40 years. For every 100 females there were 85.7 males. For every 100 females age 18 and over, there were 80.0 males.

The median income for a household in the city was $27,083, and the median income for a family was $35,208. Males had a median income of $22,813 versus $19,583 for females. The per capita income for the city was $14,622. There were 8.9% of families and 7.8% of the population living below the poverty line, including 10.0% of under eighteens and none of those over 64.

== Gallery ==
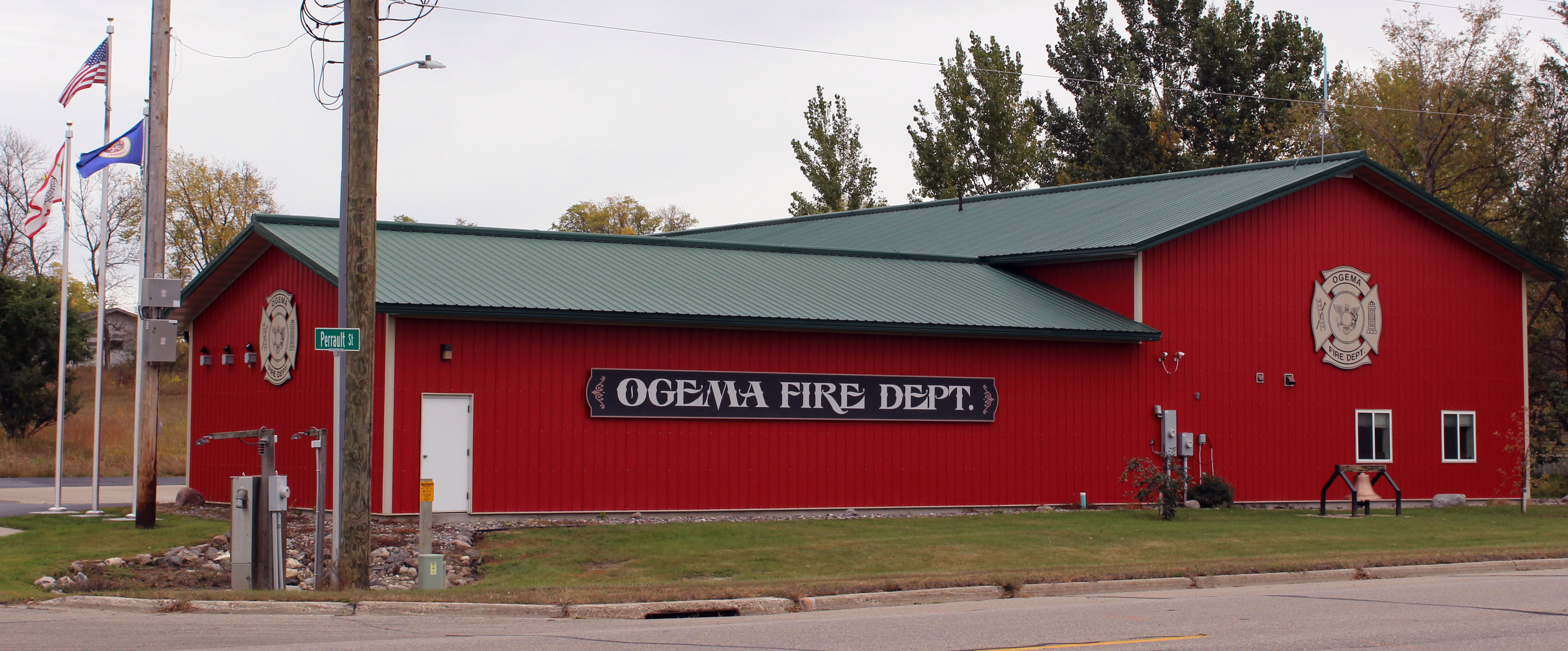
Fire Department

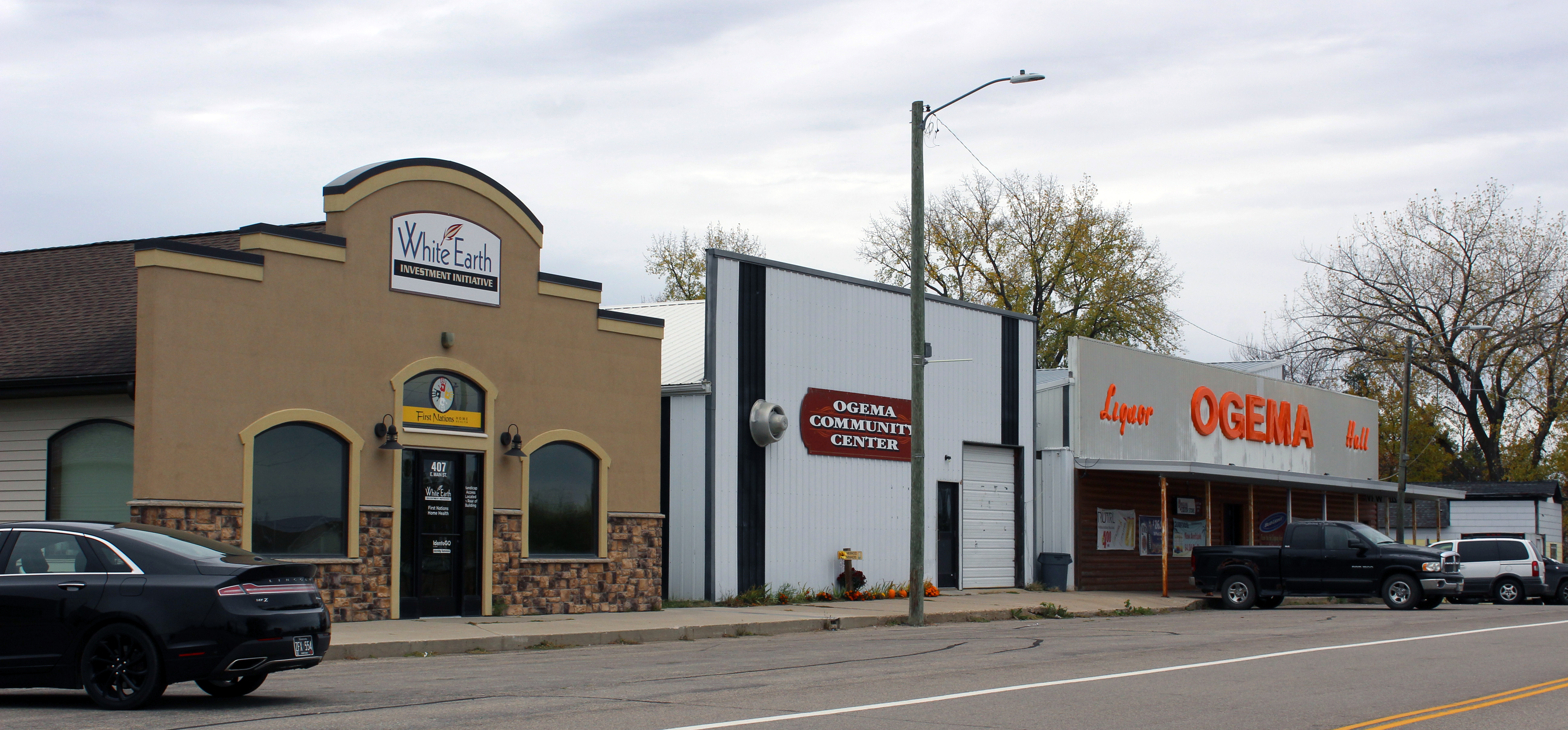
Businesses and community center on Main Street

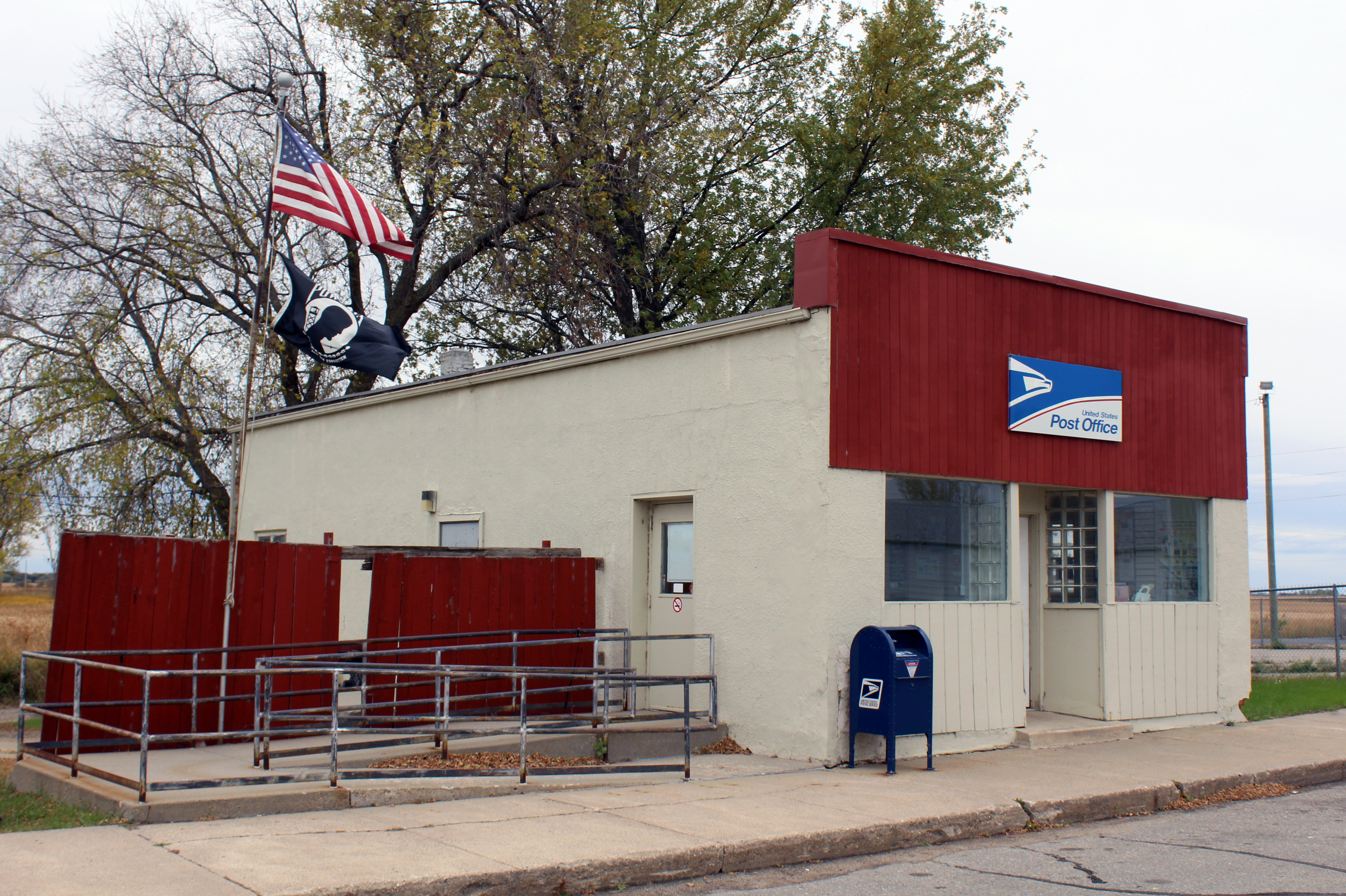
United States Post Office

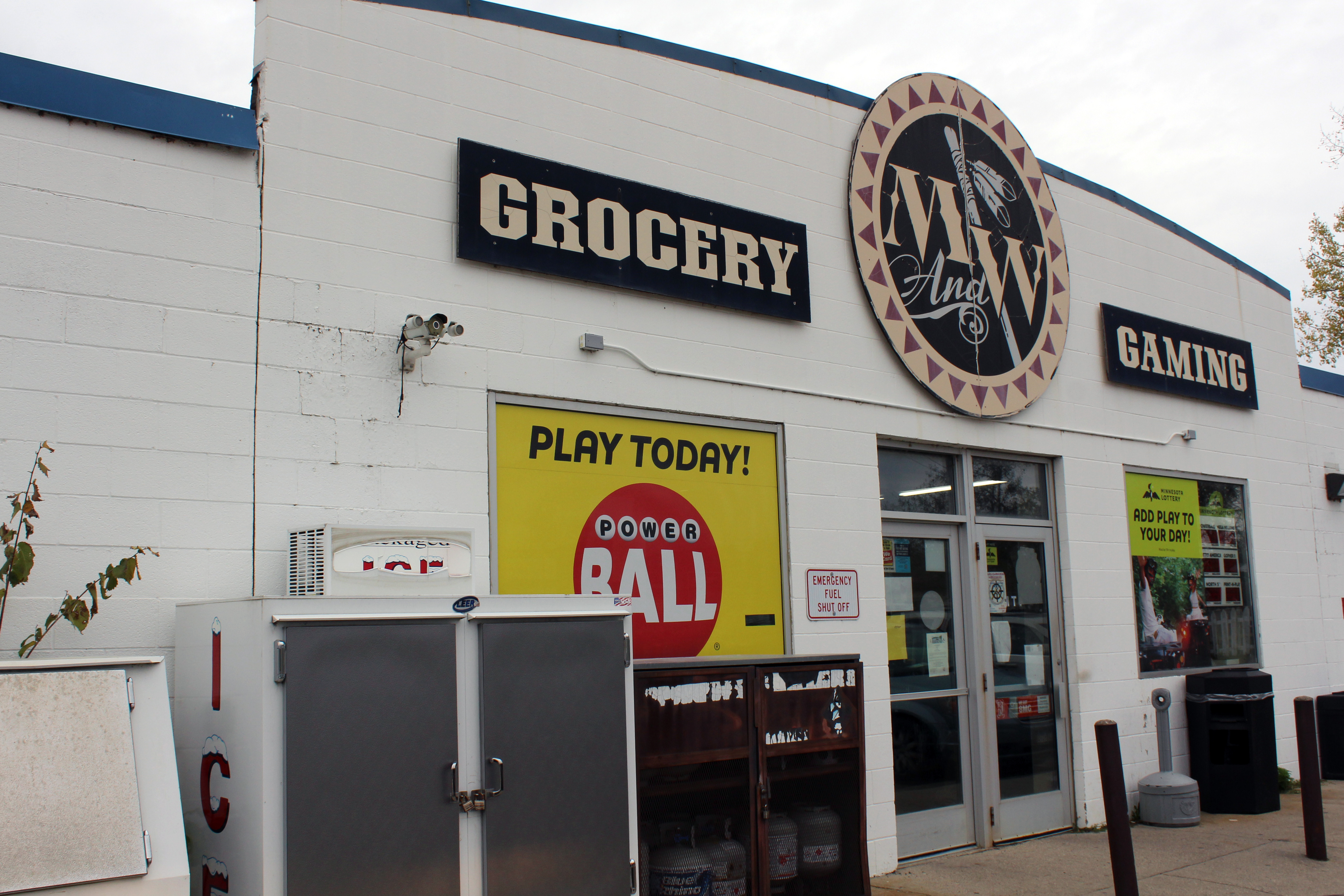
Grocery store
