= Tamarac National Wildlife Refuge =

National wildlife refuge in Minnesota, United States

- IUCN category IV (habitat/species management area)
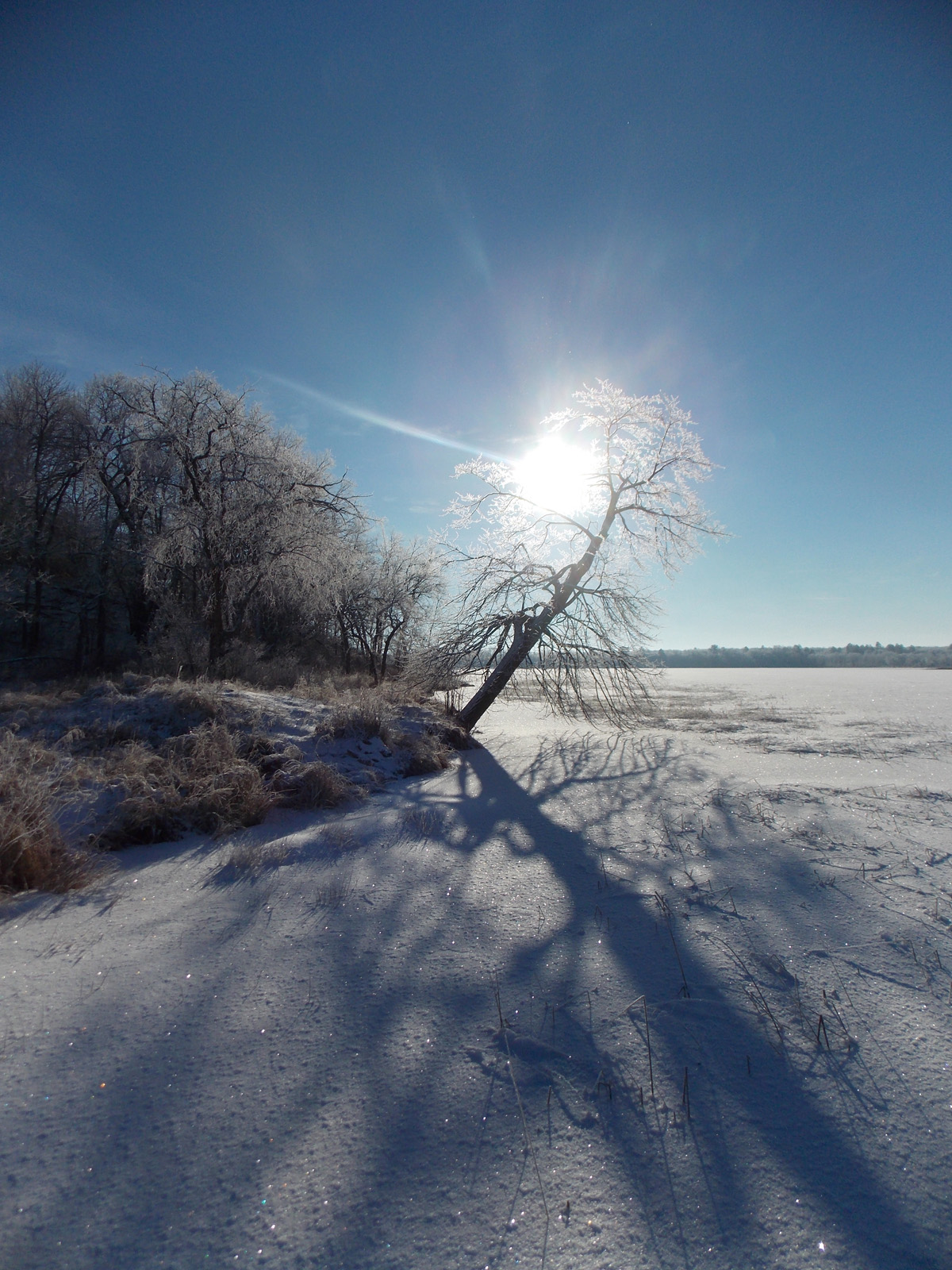

- Location within the United States
- Location: Becker County, Minnesota, United States
- Nearest city: Detroit Lakes, Minnesota
- Coordinates: 47°02′27″N 95°35′33″W
- Area: 42,724 acres (172.90 km^{2})
- Established: 1938
- Governing body: U.S. Fish and Wildlife Service
- Website: Tamarac National Wildlife Refuge

Tamarac National Wildlife Refuge is a National Wildlife Refuge of the United States. It lies in the glacial lake country of northwestern Minnesota in Becker County, 18 miles (29 km) northeast of Detroit Lakes. It was established in 1938 as a refuge breeding ground for migratory birds and other wildlife. It covers 42,724 acres (172.90 km^{2}).

Local topography consists of rolling forested hills interspersed with lakes, rivers, marshes, bogs and shrub swamps. The token of the refuge is the tamarack, or tamarac tree. This unusual tree is a deciduous conifer which turns a brilliant gold before losing its needles each fall.

Tamarac National Wildlife Refuge lies in the heart of one of the most diverse vegetative transition zones in North America, where northern hardwood forests, coniferous forests and the tallgrass prairie converge. This diversity of habitat brings with it a wealth of wildlife, both woodland and prairie species.

A visitor center offers a vista of the marshes and trees that are typical of the Tamarac Refuge. A theater presentation provides orientation to the life and legends of this unique area.

The Refuge hosts a 14-mile segment of the North Country National Scenic Trail that is open to year round foot travel.
