= Pine Point, Minnesota =

Census-designated place in Minnesota, United States

Pine Point Ne-zhingwaakokaansing (Ojibwe)
- Census-designated place
- Nickname: P-town
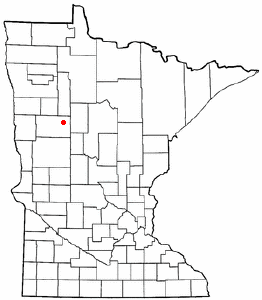
- Location of Pine Point, Minnesota
- Coordinates: 46°58′40″N 95°23′01″W
- Country: United States
- State: Minnesota
- County: Becker

Area
  - Total: 4.12 sq mi (10.67 km^{2})
  - Land: 3.60 sq mi (9.32 km^{2})
  - Water: 0.52 sq mi (1.35 km^{2})
- Elevation: 1,539 ft (469 m)

Population (2020)
  - Total: 281
  - Density: 78.1/sq mi (30.16/km^{2})
- Time zone: UTC-6 (Central (CST))
  - Summer (DST): UTC-5 (CDT)
- Area code: 218
- GNIS feature ID: 649489

Pine Point (Ojibwe: Ne-zhingwaakokaansing) is a census-designated place (CDP) in Becker County, Minnesota, United States. As of the 2020 census, Pine Point had a population of 281.

== Geography ==
According to the United States Census Bureau, the CDP has a total area of 4.1 square miles (11 km^{2}), of which 3.6 square miles (9.3 km^{2}) is land and 0.5 square miles (1.3 km^{2}) (12.65%) is water.

== Demographics ==
Historical population
Census	Pop.	Note	%±
2020	281		—
U.S. Decennial Census

As of the census of 2000, there were 337 people, 100 households, and 88 families residing in the CDP. The population density was 29.0 inhabitants per square mile (11.2/km^{2}). There were 110 housing units at an average density of 9.5/sq mi (3.7/km^{2}). The racial makeup of the CDP was 5.64% White, 93.47% Native American, and 0.89% from two or more races. Hispanic or Latino of any race were 0.30% of the population.

There were 100 households, out of which 57.0% had children under the age of 18 living with them, 23.0% were married couples living together, 51.0% had a female householder with no husband present, and 12.0% were non-families. 9.0% of all households were made up of individuals, and 2.0% had someone living alone who was 65 years of age or older. The average household size was 3.37 and the average family size was 3.31.

In the CDP, the population was spread out, with 46.0% under the age of 18, 8.3% from 18 to 24, 26.4% from 25 to 44, 13.4% from 45 to 64, and 5.9% who were 65 years of age or older. The median age was 21 years. For every 100 females, there were 99.4 males. For every 100 females age 18 and over, there were 80.2 males.

The median income for a household in the CDP was $16,607, and the median income for a family was $16,000. Males had a median income of $28,958 versus $27,857 for females. The per capita income for the CDP was $8,290. About 41.9% of families and 42.4% of the population were below the poverty line, including 52.4% of those under age 18 and 50.0% of those age 65 or over.

== In popular culture ==
The 2016 documentary The Seventh Fire concerned a Native American gang based in Pine Point.
