= Audubon, Minnesota =

City in Minnesota, United States

Audubon
- City
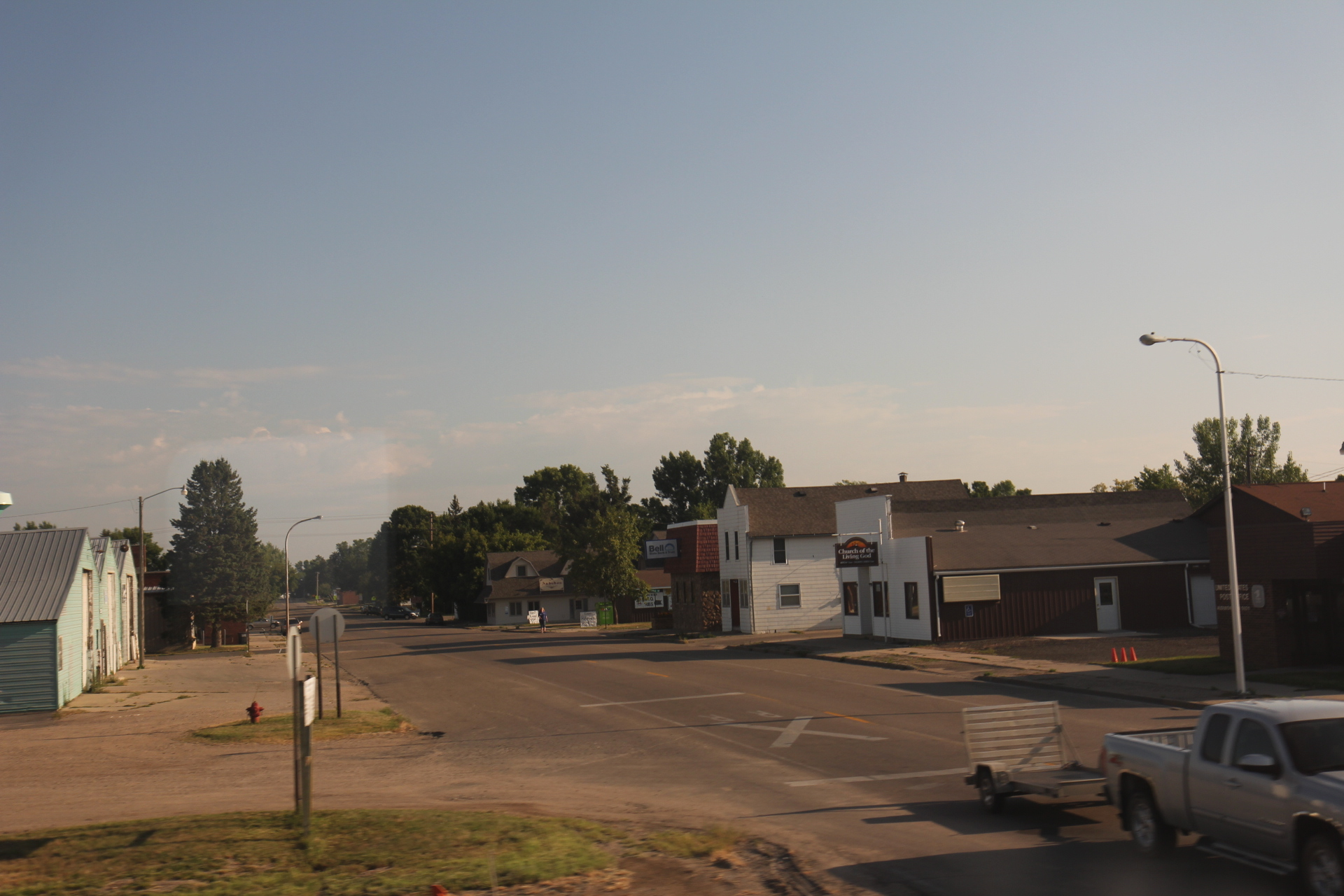
- Downtown Audubon

- Location of Audubon, Minnesota
- Coordinates: 46°51′42″N 95°58′41″W
- Country: United States
- State: Minnesota
- County: Becker

Area
  - Total: 0.73 sq mi (1.89 km^{2})
  - Land: 0.73 sq mi (1.88 km^{2})
  - Water: 0.0039 sq mi (0.01 km^{2})
- Elevation: 1,316 ft (401 m)

Population (2020)
  - Total: 560
  - Estimate (2021): 561
  - Density: 770.8/sq mi (297.61/km^{2})
- Time zone: UTC-6 (CST)
  - Summer (DST): UTC-5 (CDT)
- ZIP code: 56511
- Area code: 218
- FIPS code: 27-02728
- GNIS feature ID: 0639504
- Website: audubonmn.govoffice2.com

Audubon (/ˈɔːdəbən/ AW-də-bən) is a city in Becker County, Minnesota, United States. The population was 560 at the 2020 census.

== Geography ==
According to the United States Census Bureau, the city has a total area of 0.56 square miles (1.45 km^{2}), all land. It is located near Lake Park as well as Detroit Lakes.

== Transportation ==
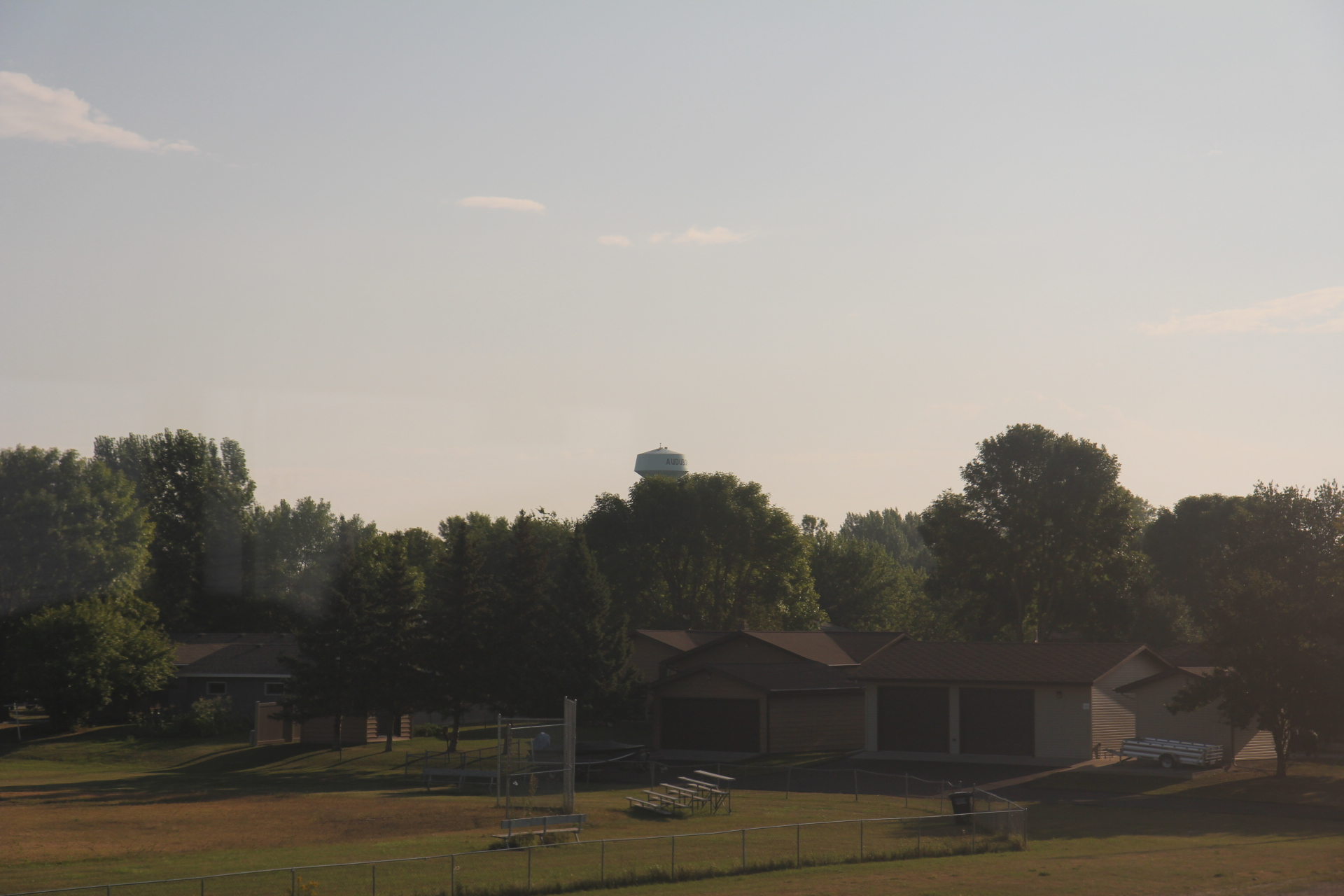
Audubon and its water tower

U.S. Route 10 serves as a main route in the community.

Amtrak’s Empire Builder, which operates between Seattle/Portland and Chicago, passes through the town on BNSF tracks, but makes no stop. The nearest station is located in Detroit Lakes, 7 miles (11 km) to the southeast.

== Business ==
Audubon has an Orton's convenience store, a U.S. post office, an on/off sale liquor store, a grain elevator, an outdoor recreation sales dealership, a diesel repair facility, a cabinet maker, a vehicle consignment dealer, a trucking company, three churches, a wood/lumber shop and an elementary school. Team Industries has a factory facility in Audubon.

== Demographics ==
Historical population
Census	Pop.	Note	%±
1880	91		—
1890	159		74.7%
1900	349		119.5%
1910	300		−14.0%
1920	314		4.7%
1930	278		−11.5%
1940	312		12.2%
1950	275		−11.9%
1960	245		−10.9%
1970	297		21.2%
1980	383		29.0%
1990	411		7.3%
2000	445		8.3%
2010	519		16.6%
2020	560		7.9%
2021 (est.)	561		0.2%
U.S. Decennial Census; 2020 Census

=== 2010 census ===
As of the census of 2010, there were 519 people, 194 households, and 132 families living in the city. The population density was 926.8 inhabitants per square mile (357.8/km^{2}). There were 228 housing units at an average density of 407.1 per square mile (157.2/km^{2}). The racial makeup of the city was 93.4% White, 1.7% African American, 2.1% Native American, 0.2% Asian, and 2.5% from two or more races.

There were 194 households, of which 41.8% had children under the age of 18 living with them, 51.5% were married couples living together, 9.8% had a female householder with no husband present, 6.7% had a male householder with no wife present, and 32.0% were non-families. 23.7% of all households were made up of individuals, and 8.3% had someone living alone who was 65 years of age or older. The average household size was 2.68 and the average family size was 3.20.

The median age in the city was 29.4 years. 31.6% of residents were under the age of 18; 10.8% were between the ages of 18 and 24; 27.8% were from 25 to 44; 19.1% were from 45 to 64; and 10.8% were 65 years of age or older. The gender makeup of the city was 51.4% male and 48.6% female.

=== 2000 census ===
As of the census of 2000, there were 445 people, 175 households, and 119 families living in the city. The population density was 764.0 inhabitants per square mile (295.0/km^{2}). There were 191 housing units at an average density of 327.9 per square mile (126.6/km^{2}). The racial makeup of the city was 94.38% White, 4.27% Native American, and 1.35% from two or more races. Hispanic or Latino of any race were 1.12% of the population.

There were 175 households, out of which 40.6% had children under the age of 18 living with them, 48.6% were married couples living together, 12.6% had a female householder with no husband present, and 32.0% were non-families. 26.9% of all households were made up of individuals, and 12.0% had someone living alone who was 65 years of age or older. The average household size was 2.54 and the average family size was 3.08.

In the city, the population was spread out, with 30.3% under the age of 18, 10.3% from 18 to 24, 26.5% from 25 to 44, 20.2% from 45 to 64, and 12.6% who were 65 years of age or older. The median age was 31 years. For every 100 females, there were 105.1 males. For every 100 females age 18 and over, there were 97.5 males.

The median income for a household in the city was $35,729, and the median income for a family was $40,250. Males had a median income of $28,500 versus $18,000 for females. The per capita income for the city was $13,435. About 16.8% of families and 18.2% of the population were below the poverty line, including 20.6% of those under age 18 and 7.8% of those age 65 or over.

== In popular culture ==
The 2005 film Sweet Land is set in Audubon during the 1920s. The film was actually shot in Montevideo, Minnesota.

== Notable person ==
- Joe Marshall, baseball player
