= Becker County, Minnesota =

County in Minnesota, United States

- County
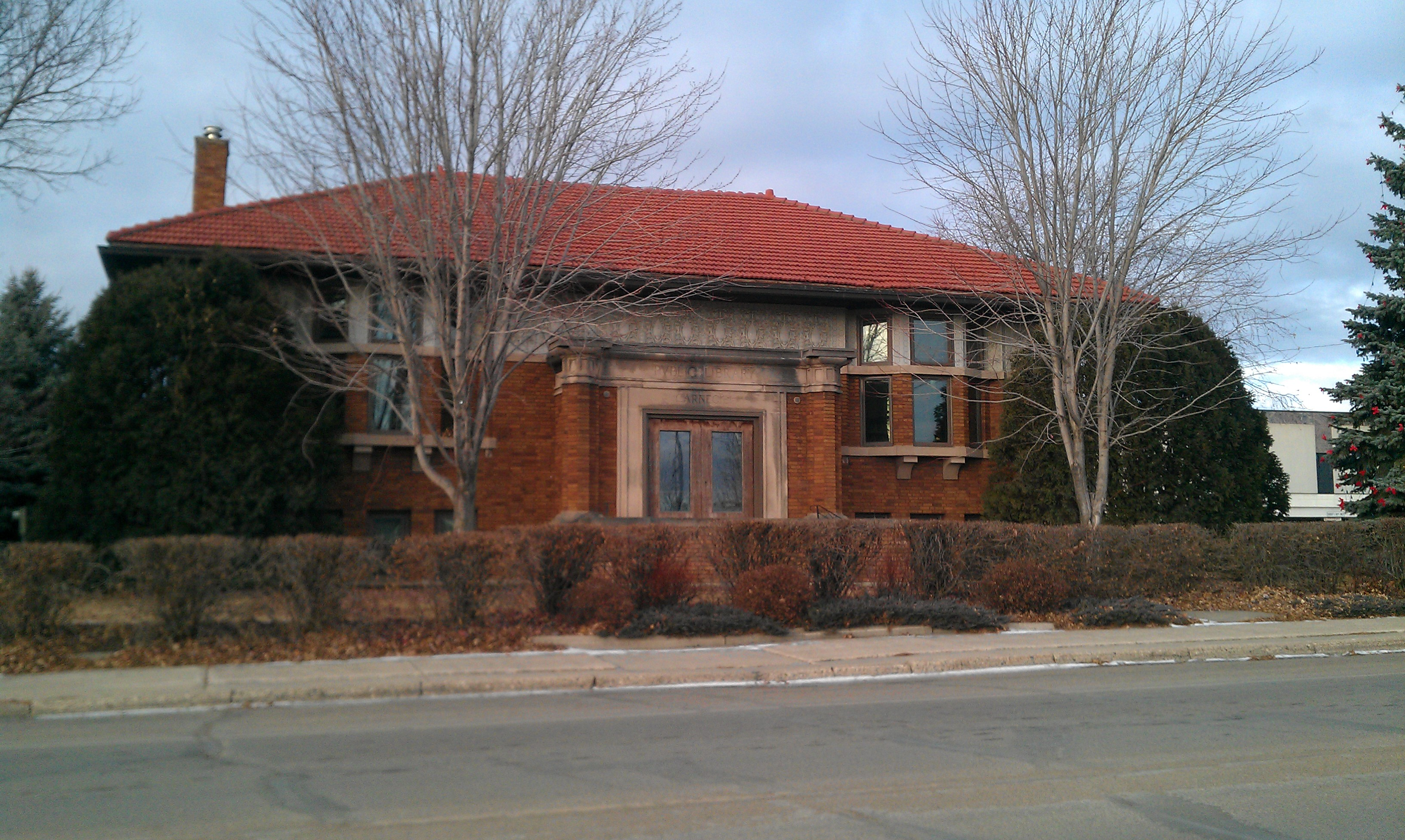
- 1913 Prairie School Carnegie library designed by Claude and Starck in Detroit Lakes

- Location within the U.S. state of Minnesota
- Coordinates: 46.937629°N 95.741757°W
- Country: United States
- State: Minnesota
- Founded: March 18, 1858 (created); March 6, 1871 (organized)
- Named for: George Loomis Becker
- Seat: Detroit Lakes
- Largest city: Detroit Lakes

Area
  - Total: 1,445.150 sq mi (3,742.92 km^{2})
  - Land: 1,315.037 sq mi (3,405.93 km^{2})
  - Water: 130.113 sq mi (336.99 km^{2}) 9.00%

Population (2020)
  - Total: 35,183
  - Estimate (2025): 35,497 ▲
  - Density: 26.962/sq mi (10.410/km^{2})
- Time zone: UTC−6 (Central)
  - Summer (DST): UTC−5 (CDT)
- Area code: 218
- Congressional districts: 7th, 8th
- Website: co.becker.mn.us

Becker County is a county in the U.S. state of Minnesota. As of the 2020 census, the population was 35,183, and was estimated at 35,497 in 2025. Its county seat is Detroit Lakes.

Part of the White Earth Indian Reservation extends into the county.

== History ==
The county was created on March 18, 1858 and organized on March 6, 1871. It was named for George Loomis Becker, one of three men elected to Congress when Minnesota became a state. Since Minnesota could only send two, Becker elected to stay behind, and he was promised to have a county named after him.

Colonel George Johnston founded the city of Detroit Lakes in 1871. It grew quickly with the construction of the Northern Pacific Railroad. Johnston led settlers from New England to settle in this region. An 1877 election decided that Detroit Lakes, then known as Detroit, would become the county seat. Detroit won the election by a 90% majority. Frazee, Lake Park, and Audubon were also in the running.

Soils of Becker County

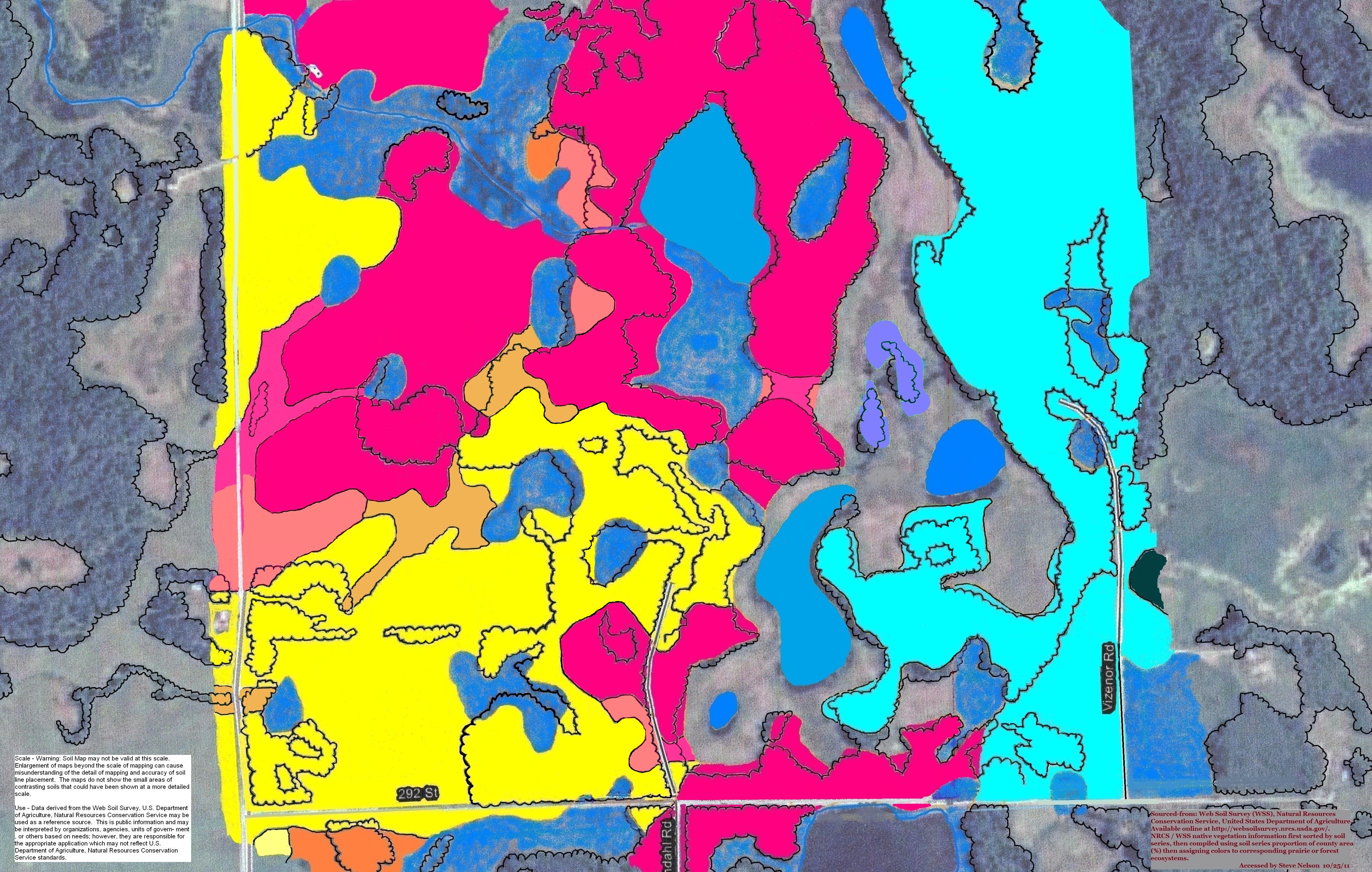
Soils of Callaway WMA area

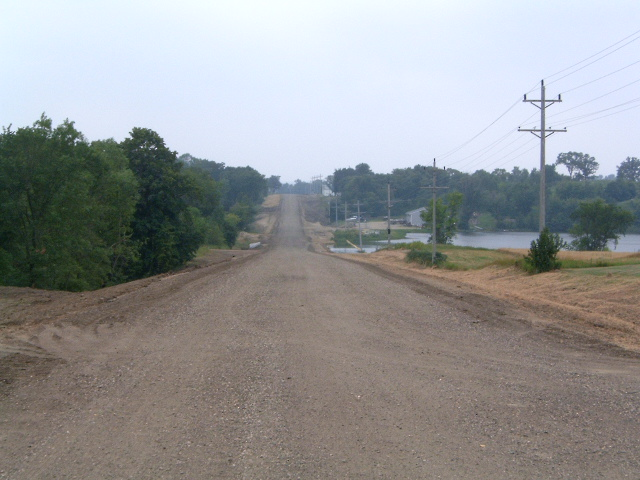
A country road in Becker County in summer

In 1884, Detroit Lakes had many businesses, including two hotels, a bank, a newspaper, and an opera house. The first courthouse was built that year. In 1885, the first county fire department was constructed. In 1903, the Soo Line Railroad built a line through the county.

Detroit Lakes hosts a park dedicated to the Grand Army of the Republic. The city rededicated the park on April 15, 2015, marking the 150th anniversary of the end of the Civil War and the death of President Lincoln. Colonel Tom Mortenson and his wife, Pam, sponsored the rededication, representing the Women's Relief Corps, which spearheaded community support for the effort that included new signage for the park and a time capsule to be opened on the 200th anniversary.

== Geography ==
The county terrain consists of low rolling hills, tree-covered and dotted with lakes and ponds. The terrain slopes to the west and north. Its highest point is a hill 2.1 miles (3.4 km) northeast of Wolf Lake, the site of the USFS Wolf Lake lookout tower, at 1,861 ft (567 m) ASL. The next highest point is near its northwest corner, at 1,631 ft (497 m) ASL.

According to the United States Census Bureau, the county has a total area of 1,445.150 square miles (3,742.92 km^{2}), of which 1,315.037 square miles (3,405.93 km^{2}) is land and 130.113 square miles (336.99 km^{2}) (9.00%) is water. It is the 15th largest county in Minnesota by total area.

Becker County has diverse topography. It is home to several hundred lakes, many acres of fertile farmland, and forested areas. Much of the land consists of hills and deciduous trees.

=== Major highways ===
- U.S. Highway 10
- U.S. Highway 59
- Minnesota State Highway 34
- Minnesota State Highway 87
- Minnesota State Highway 113

=== Adjacent counties ===
- Mahnomen County - north
- Clearwater County - northeast
- Hubbard County - northeast
- Wadena County - southeast
- Otter Tail County - south
- Clay County - west
- Norman County - northwest

=== Protected areas ===
- Atlanta State Wildlife Management Area
- Becker State Wildlife Management Area
- Callaway State Wildlife Management Area
- Frank State Wildlife Management Area
- Greenwater Lake Scientific and Natural Area
- Hamden Slough National Wildlife Refuge
- Hasca State Park (part)
- Lunde State Wildlife Management Area
- Melbye State Wildlife Management Area
- Ogema Springs State Wildlife Management Area
- Pednor State Wildlife Management Area
- Riparia State Wildlife Management Area
- Smoky Hills State Forest
- Tamarac National Wildlife Refuge
  - Tamarac Wilderness
- Teiken-Dalve State Wildlife Management Area
- Two Inlets State Forest
- White Earth State Wildlife Management Area

== Climate and weather ==
Detroit Lakes, Minnesota

Climate chart (precipitation, max. and min. temperature)
| J | F | M | A | M | J | J | A | S | O | N | D |
| 0.8 19 −2 | 0.5 26 3 | 1.1 37 17 | 1.9 56 32 | 3.5 69 45 | 4.4 78 55 | 3.8 82 60 | 3 81 58 | 3.6 71 47 | 3.1 56 35 | 1.2 38 21 | 0.7 23 5 |
- █ Average max. and min. temperatures in °F
- █ Precipitation totals in inches
- Source: The Weather Channel
Metric conversion
| J | F | M | A | M | J | J | A | S | O | N | D |
| 20 −7 −19 | 13 −3 −16 | 27 3 −8 | 47 13 0 | 89 21 7 | 113 26 13 | 97 28 16 | 75 27 14 | 91 22 8 | 77 13 2 | 30 3 −6 | 18 −5 −15 |
- █ Average max. and min. temperatures in °C
- █ Precipitation totals in mm

In recent years, average temperatures in Detroit Lakes have ranged from a low of −2 °F (−19 °C) in January to a high of 82 °F (28 °C) in July; a record low of −46 °F (−43 °C) was recorded in February 1936 and a record high of 107 °F (42 °C) was recorded in July 1936. Average monthly precipitation ranged from 0.53 inches (13 mm) in February to 4.44 inches (113 mm) in June. The region can experience severe weather such as Tornados, with multiple EF-2 or higher tornados recorded in the area.

== Demographics ==
Historical population
| Census | Pop. | Note | %± |
|---|---|---|---|
| 1860 | 386 | | — |
| 1870 | 308 | | −20.2% |
| 1880 | 5,218 | | 1,594.2% |
| 1890 | 9,401 | | 80.2% |
| 1900 | 14,375 | | 52.9% |
| 1910 | 18,840 | | 31.1% |
| 1920 | 22,851 | | 21.3% |
| 1930 | 22,503 | | −1.5% |
| 1940 | 26,562 | | 18.0% |
| 1950 | 24,836 | | −6.5% |
| 1960 | 23,959 | | −3.5% |
| 1970 | 24,372 | | 1.7% |
| 1980 | 29,336 | | 20.4% |
| 1990 | 27,881 | | −5.0% |
| 2000 | 30,000 | | 7.6% |
| 2010 | 32,504 | | 8.3% |
| 2020 | 35,183 | | 8.2% |
| 2025 (est.) | 35,497 | ▲ | 0.9% |
U.S. Decennial Census; 1790–1960 1900–1990; 1990–2000 2010–2020

As of the third quarter of 2024, the median home value in Becker County was $286,500.

As of the 2023 American Community Survey, there are 14,404 estimated households in Becker County with an average of 2.41 persons per household. The county has a median household income of $71,117. Approximately 11.8% of the county's population lives at or below the poverty line. Becker County has an estimated 61.0% employment rate, with 27.5% of the population holding a bachelor's degree or higher and 93.3% holding a high school diploma.

The top five reported ancestries (people were allowed to report up to two ancestries, thus the figures will generally add to more than 100%) were English (96.9%), Spanish (1.0%), Indo-European (0.6%), Asian and Pacific Islander (0.5%), and Other (1.0%).

=== Racial and ethnic composition ===
Becker County, Minnesota – racial and ethnic composition
Note: the US Census treats Hispanic/Latino as an ethnic category. This table excludes Latinos from the racial categories and assigns them to a separate category. Hispanics/Latinos may be of any race.

| Race / ethnicity (NH = non-Hispanic) | Pop. 1980 | Pop. 1990 | Pop. 2000 | Pop. 2010 | Pop. 2020 |
|---|---|---|---|---|---|
| White alone (NH) | 27,420 (93.47%) | 25,786 (92.49%) | 26,699 (89.00%) | 28,539 (87.80%) | 29,645 (84.26%) |
| Black or African American alone (NH) | 10 (0.03%) | 20 (0.07%) | 54 (0.18%) | 128 (0.39%) | 200 (0.57%) |
| Native American or Alaska Native alone (NH) | 1,720 (5.86%) | 1,853 (6.65%) | 2,229 (7.43%) | 2,372 (7.30%) | 2,417 (6.87%) |
| Asian alone (NH) | 45 (0.15%) | 100 (0.36%) | 108 (0.36%) | 124 (0.38%) | 156 (0.44%) |
| Pacific Islander alone (NH) | — | — | 4 (0.01%) | 7 (0.02%) | 9 (0.03%) |
| Other race alone (NH) | 14 (0.05%) | 2 (0.01%) | 18 (0.06%) | 17 (0.05%) | 100 (0.28%) |
| Mixed race or multiracial (NH) | — | — | 658 (2.19%) | 919 (2.83%) | 2,081 (5.91%) |
| Hispanic or Latino (any race) | 127 (0.43%) | 120 (0.43%) | 230 (0.77%) | 398 (1.22%) | 575 (1.63%) |
| Total | 29,336 (100.00%) | 27,881 (100.00%) | 30,000 (100.00%) | 32,504 (100.00%) | 35,183 (100.00%) |

=== 2023 estimate ===
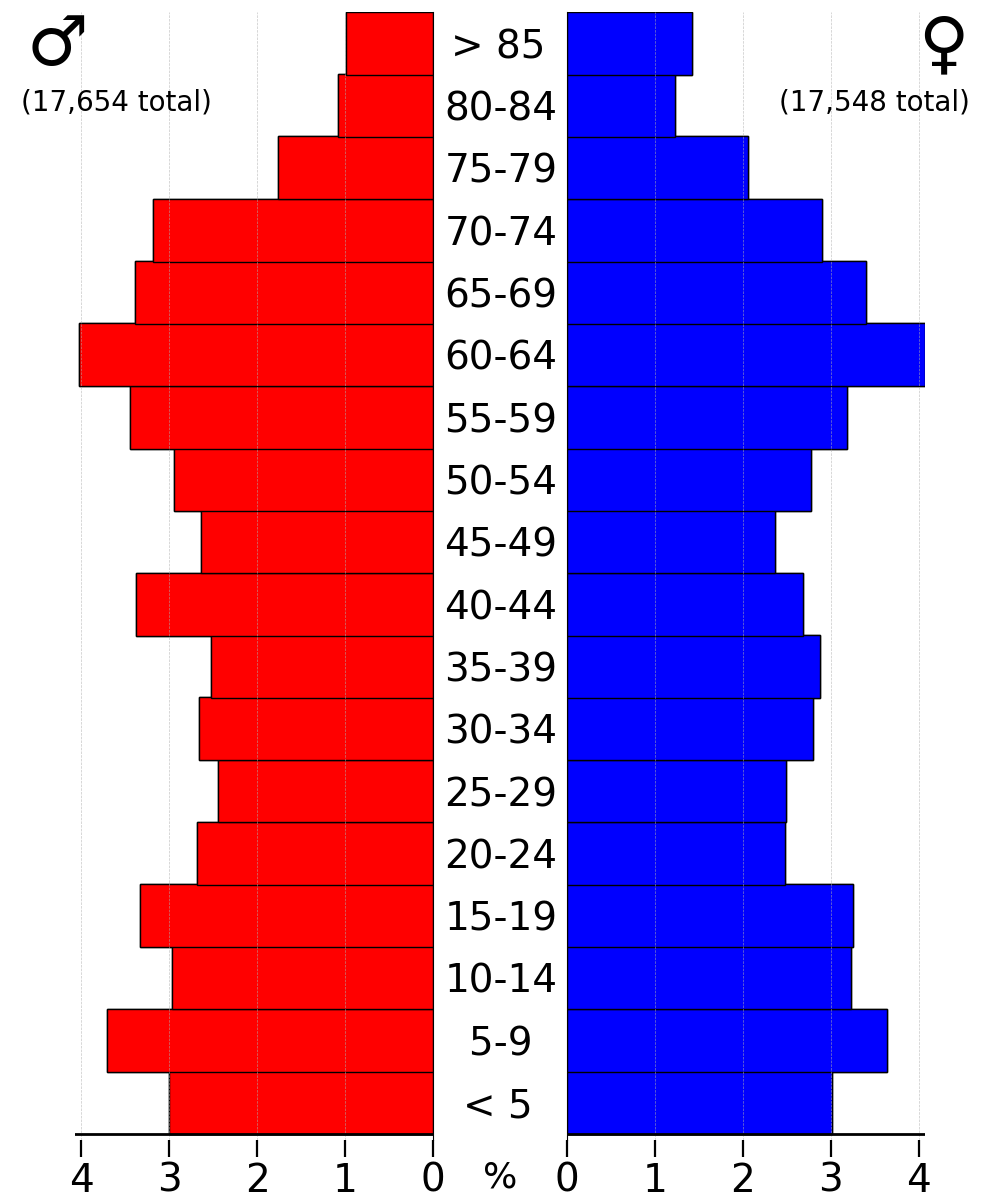
2022 US Census population pyramid for Becker County, from ACS 5-year estimates

As of the 2023 estimate, there were 35,283 people and 14,404 households residing in the county. There were 20,168 housing units. The racial makeup of the county was 87.7% White (86.5% NH White), 0.8% African American, 7.3% Native American, 0.6% Asian, 0.1% Pacific Islander, _% from some other races and 3.7% from two or more races. Hispanic or Latino people of any race were 2.1% of the population.

In the 2023 estimate, Becker County is the 40th wealthiest county in Minnesota. $60,360 for per capita income.

=== 2020 census ===
As of the 2020 census, the county had a population of 35,183. The median age was 43.3 years. 24.0% of residents were under the age of 18 and 22.3% of residents were 65 years of age or older. For every 100 females there were 101.1 males, and for every 100 females age 18 and over there were 101.1 males age 18 and over.

The racial makeup of the county was 84.8% White, 0.6% Black or African American, 7.0% American Indian and Alaska Native, 0.5% Asian, 0.1% Native Hawaiian and Pacific Islander, 0.5% from some other race, and 6.6% from two or more races. Hispanic or Latino residents of any race comprised 1.6% of the population.

29.1% of residents lived in urban areas, while 70.9% lived in rural areas.

There were 14,371 households in the county, of which 27.0% had children under the age of 18 living in them. Of all households, 51.5% were married-couple households, 19.7% were households with a male householder and no spouse or partner present, and 22.0% were households with a female householder and no spouse or partner present. About 29.2% of all households were made up of individuals and 14.0% had someone living alone who was 65 years of age or older.

There were 19,620 housing units, of which 26.8% were vacant. Among occupied housing units, 77.7% were owner-occupied and 22.3% were renter-occupied. The homeowner vacancy rate was 1.3% and the rental vacancy rate was 5.5%.

=== 2010 census ===
As of the 2010 census, there were 32,504 people, 13,224 households, and _ families residing in the county. The population density was 24.7 inhabitants per square mile (9.5/km^{2}). There were 18,784 housing units at an average density of 14.3 per square mile (5.5/km^{2}). The racial makeup of the county was 81.63% White, 0.39% African American, 6.98% Native American, 0.36% Asian, 0.02% Pacific Islander, 0.25% from some other races and 2.76% from two or more races. Hispanic or Latino people of any race were 1.22% of the population.

=== 2000 census ===
As of the 2000 census, there were 30,000 people, 11,844 households, and 8,184 families in the county. The population density was 22.8 inhabitants per square mile (8.8/km^{2}). There were 16,612 housing units at an average density of 12.7 per square mile (4.9/km^{2}). The racial makeup of the county was 89.35% White, 0.19% African American, 7.52% Native American, 0.36% Asian, 0.01% Pacific Islander, 0.24% from some other races and 2.32% from two or more races. Hispanic or Latino people of any race were 0.77% of the population.

In terms of ancestry, 32.2% were of German, 26.0% Norwegian and 5.2% Swedish.

There were 11,844 households, of which 31.3% had children under the age of 18 living with them, 57.1% were married couples living together, 7.9% had a female householder with no husband present, and 30.9% were non-families. 26.9% of all households were made up of individuals, and 12.6% had someone living alone who was 65 or older. The average household size was 2.49 and the average family size was 3.02.

The county population contained 26.6% under age 18, 7.1% from 18 to 24, 24.9% from 25 to 44, 24.9% from 45 to 64, and 16.4% 65 or older. The median age was 39. For every 100 females there were 99.4 males. For every 100 females 18 and over, there were 97.8 males.

The median income for a household in the county was $34,797, and the median income for a family was $41,807. Males had a median income of $29,641 versus $20,693 for females. The per capita income for the county was $17,085. About 8.5% of families and 12.2% of the population were below the poverty line, including 16.4% of those under 18 and 11.8% of those 65 and over.

== Communities ==
=== Cities ===
- Audubon
- Callaway
- Detroit Lakes
- Frazee
- Lake Park
- Ogema
- Wolf Lake

Townships of Becker County

=== Townships ===
- Atlanta Township
- Audubon Township
- Burlington Township
- Callaway Township
- Carsonville Township
- Cormorant Township
- Cuba Township
- Detroit Township
- Eagle View Township
- Erie Township
- Evergreen Township
- Forest Township
- Green Valley Township
- Hamden Township
- Height of Land Township
- Holmesville Township
- Lake Eunice Township
- Lake Park Township
- Lake View Township
- Maple Grove Township
- Osage Township
- Pine Point Township
- Riceville Township
- Richwood Township
- Round Lake Township
- Runeberg Township
- Savannah Township
- Shell Lake Township
- Silver Leaf Township
- Spring Creek Township
- Spruce Grove Township
- Sugar Bush Township
- Toad Lake Township
- Two Inlets Township
- Walworth Township
- White Earth Township
- Wolf Lake Township

=== Census-designated places ===
- Elbow Lake
- Osage
- Pine Point
- White Earth

=== Unincorporated communities ===
- Bucks Mill
- Cormorant
- Goldenrod
- Midway
- Oak Lake
- Pine Point
- Ponsford
- Richwood
- Rochert
- Shoreham
- Snellman
- Two Inlets

== Lakes ==
- Big Cormorant Lake (Minnesota)
- Middle Cormorant Lake
- Upper Cormorant Lake
- Little Cormorant Lake
- Nelson Lake
- Erickson Lake
- Lake Melissa
- Detroit Lake
- Lake Sallie
- Lake Maud
- Lake Eunice
- Loon Lake
- Sauers Lake

== Government and politics ==
From its inaugural election in 1872 to 1928, Becker County voted Republican all but twice and never voted Democratic; the only two occasions it backed a non-Republican in that span were in 1912 when former Republican president turned Progressive candidate Theodore Roosevelt carried the county and in 1924 when Progressive Robert M. La Follette narrowly carried the county, edging out incumbent Republican president Calvin Coolidge by just 151 votes in the county. Following Black Tuesday and the onset of the Great Depression, Becker County proceeded to voted Democrat in nearly every election for the next half-century, only backing the Republican nominee in nationwide Republican landslides in 1952 and 1972 by Dwight D. Eisenhower and Richard Nixon respectively in the elections from 1932 to 1976, though the Democrat margin of victories were typically modest outside of their nationwide landslides. Beginning in 1980, Becker County has backed the Republican nominee in every presidential election except for the reelection of Bill Clinton in 1996, and never by huge margins up to and including 2012. However, in 2016, Donald Trump attained the highest percentage of the vote and margin of victory for either party in the county since 1936 and the highest for a Republican since 1920. He again broke this record in 2020 and 2024, receiving 66% of the vote in 2024.

United States presidential election results for Becker County, Minnesota
| Year | Republican | | Democratic | | Third party(ies) | |
| Year | No. | % | No. | % | No. | % |
|---|---|---|---|---|---|---|
| 1892 | 853 | 55.43% | 266 | 17.28% | 420 | 27.29% |
| 1896 | 1,479 | 58.81% | 985 | 39.17% | 51 | 2.03% |
| 1900 | 1,790 | 64.62% | 771 | 27.83% | 209 | 7.55% |
| 1904 | 1,872 | 79.49% | 310 | 13.16% | 173 | 7.35% |
| 1908 | 2,058 | 64.39% | 728 | 22.78% | 410 | 12.83% |
| 1912 | 509 | 16.76% | 732 | 24.10% | 1,796 | 59.14% |
| 1916 | 1,761 | 50.44% | 1,453 | 41.62% | 277 | 7.93% |
| 1920 | 4,811 | 75.78% | 901 | 14.19% | 637 | 10.03% |
| 1924 | 2,936 | 45.51% | 429 | 6.65% | 3,087 | 47.85% |
| 1928 | 4,273 | 55.47% | 3,253 | 42.23% | 177 | 2.30% |
| 1932 | 2,299 | 28.00% | 5,547 | 67.56% | 364 | 4.43% |
| 1936 | 2,683 | 28.34% | 6,473 | 68.38% | 310 | 3.27% |
| 1940 | 4,292 | 39.68% | 6,432 | 59.47% | 92 | 0.85% |
| 1944 | 3,803 | 43.46% | 4,889 | 55.87% | 58 | 0.66% |
| 1948 | 3,495 | 35.93% | 5,885 | 60.50% | 347 | 3.57% |
| 1952 | 5,815 | 55.84% | 4,539 | 43.59% | 60 | 0.58% |
| 1956 | 4,608 | 49.81% | 4,619 | 49.93% | 24 | 0.26% |
| 1960 | 5,090 | 48.99% | 5,257 | 50.60% | 42 | 0.40% |
| 1964 | 3,751 | 36.70% | 6,453 | 63.14% | 16 | 0.16% |
| 1968 | 4,728 | 46.37% | 4,875 | 47.81% | 593 | 5.82% |
| 1972 | 6,033 | 55.43% | 4,695 | 43.14% | 156 | 1.43% |
| 1976 | 5,611 | 44.65% | 6,597 | 52.50% | 358 | 2.85% |
| 1980 | 6,848 | 52.14% | 5,221 | 39.75% | 1,065 | 8.11% |
| 1984 | 7,553 | 57.65% | 5,456 | 41.65% | 92 | 0.70% |
| 1988 | 6,738 | 53.26% | 5,787 | 45.74% | 126 | 1.00% |
| 1992 | 5,430 | 39.63% | 4,958 | 36.18% | 3,314 | 24.19% |
| 1996 | 5,461 | 40.83% | 5,911 | 44.20% | 2,002 | 14.97% |
| 2000 | 8,152 | 56.88% | 5,253 | 36.65% | 928 | 6.47% |
| 2004 | 9,795 | 58.30% | 6,756 | 40.21% | 250 | 1.49% |
| 2008 | 8,851 | 52.17% | 7,687 | 45.31% | 427 | 2.52% |
| 2012 | 9,204 | 56.18% | 6,829 | 41.69% | 349 | 2.13% |
| 2016 | 10,880 | 63.18% | 5,208 | 30.24% | 1,134 | 6.58% |
| 2020 | 12,438 | 64.11% | 6,589 | 33.96% | 374 | 1.93% |
| 2024 | 12,961 | 65.66% | 6,435 | 32.60% | 343 | 1.74% |

County Board of Commissioners
| Position | Name | District | Term ends |
|---|---|---|---|
| Commissioner | Erica Jepson | District 1 | 2026 |
| Commissioner | David Meyer | District 2 | 2026 |
| Commissioner | John Okeson | District 3 | 2024 |
| Commissioner | Richard Vareberg | District 4 | 2024 |
| Commissioner | Barry Nelson | District 5 | 2024 |

State Legislature (2023–2025)
| Position | Name | Affiliation | District |
|---|---|---|---|
| Minnesota State Senate | Steve Green | Republican | District 2 |
| Minnesota State Senate | Rob Kupec | Democrat | District 4 |
| Minnesota State Senate | Paul Utke | Republican | District 5 |
| Minnesota House of Representatives | Matt Bliss | Republican | District 2B |
| Minnesota House of Representatives | Jim Joy | Republican | District 4B |
| Minnesota House of Representatives | Krista Knudsen | Republican | District 5A |

U.S Congress (2022–2025)
| Position | Name | Affiliation | District |
|---|---|---|---|
| House of Representatives | Michelle Fischbach | Republican | 7th |
| Senate | Amy Klobuchar | Democrat | N/A |
| Senate | Tina Smith | Democrat | N/A |

== In popular culture ==
Becker County is the setting of the 2006 independent film Sweet Land, though it was filmed in Chippewa County.

A popular YouTube channel, CBOYSTV films, is headquartered in Becker County. CBoysTV is an American comedy and motorsports channel run by five men. The channel has amassed over a million subscribers.

== Images ==
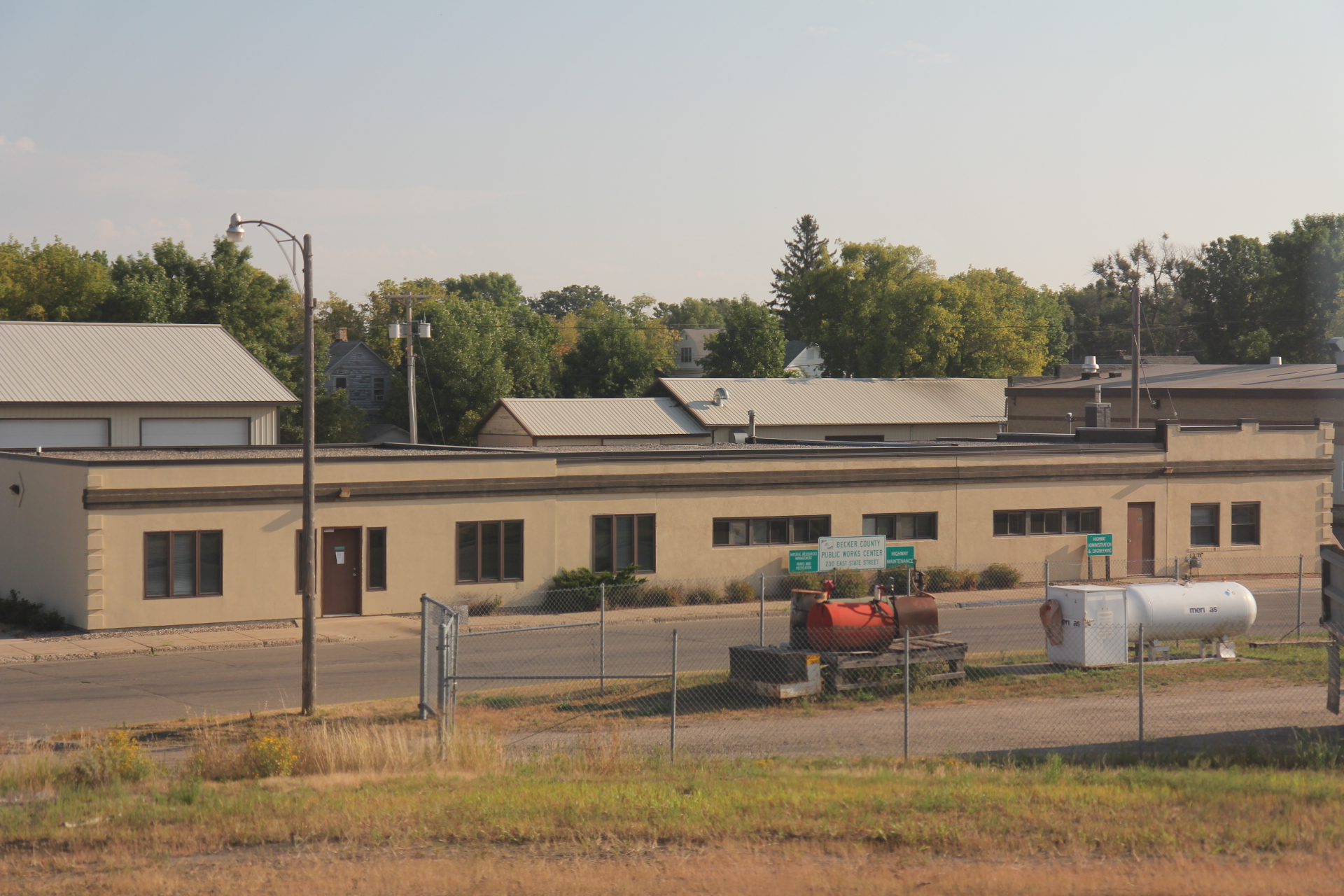
The County Public Works Center for Becker County in Detroit Lakes

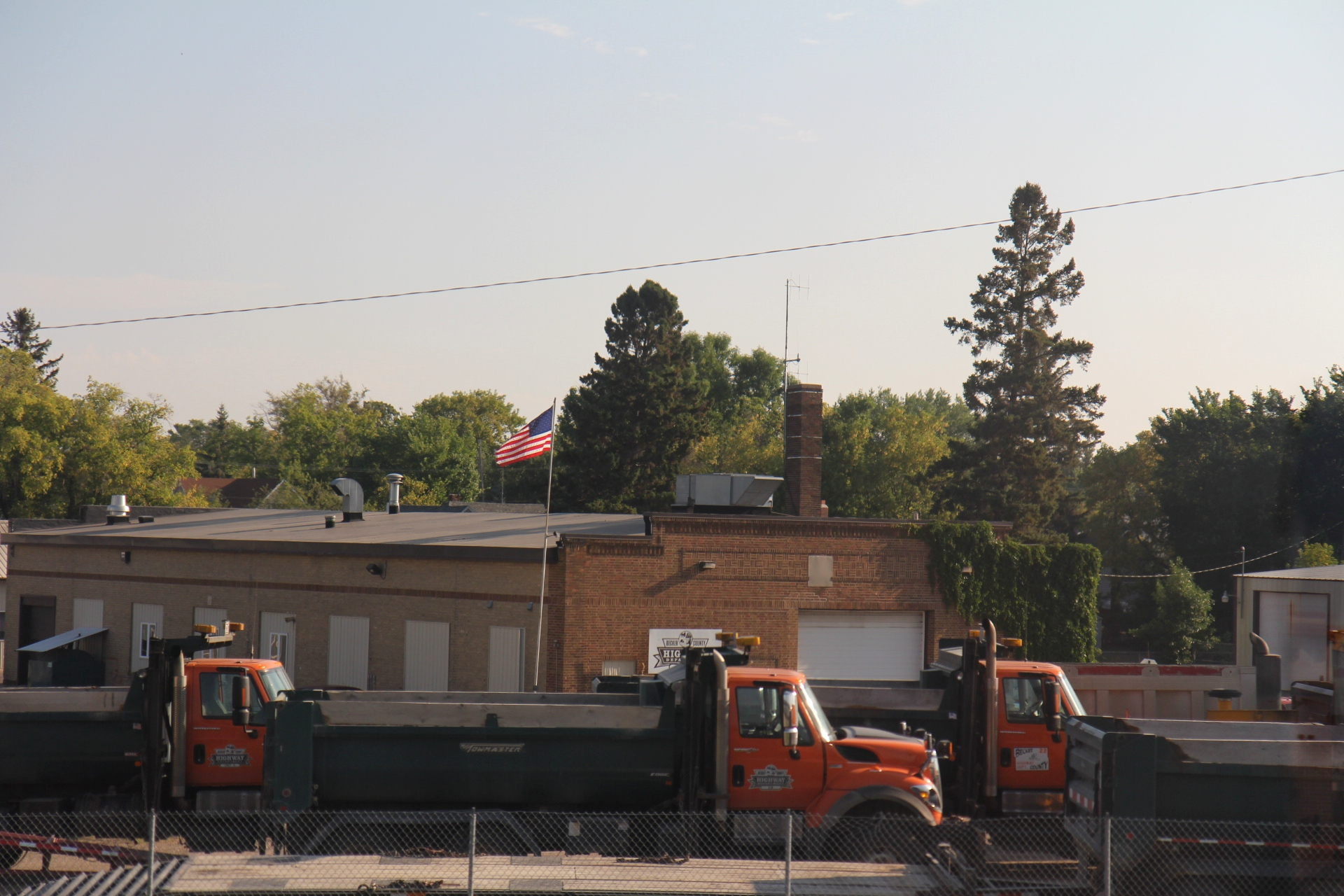
Highway Department building for Becker County

== See also ==
- National Register of Historic Places listings in Becker County, Minnesota
