= List of airports in Nevada =

This is a list of airports in Nevada (a U.S. state), grouped by type and sorted by location. It contains all public-use and military airports in the state. Some private-use and former airports may be included where notable, such as airports that were previously public-use, those with commercial enplanements recorded by the FAA or airports assigned an IATA airport code.

== Airports ==
This list contains the following information:

- **City served** – The city generally associated with the airport, as per the airport's master record with the Federal Aviation Administration. This is not always the actual location since some airports are located in smaller towns outside of the city they serve. It is not meant to be a complete list of cities served, which can be found in or added to each airport's Wikipedia article.
- **FAA** – The location identifier assigned by the Federal Aviation Administration (FAA). These are linked to each airport's page at the .
- **IATA** – The airport code assigned by the International Air Transport Association (IATA). Those that do not match the FAA code are shown in bold.
- **ICAO** – The location indicator assigned by the International Civil Aviation Organization (ICAO).
- **Airport name** – The official airport name. Those shown in **bold** indicate the airport has scheduled passenger service on commercial airlines.
- **Role** – One of four FAA airport categories, as per the 2025-2029 National Plan of Integrated Airport Systems (NPIAS) report released October 2024:
  - P-s: Commercial service – primary are publicly owned airports that receive scheduled passenger service and have more than 10,000 passenger boardings (enplanements) each year. Each primary airport is sub-classified by the FAA as one of the following four "hub" types (s):
    - L: Large hub that accounts for at least 1% of total U.S. passenger enplanements.
    - M: Medium hub that accounts for between 0.25% and 1% of total U.S. passenger enplanements.
    - S: Small hub that accounts for between 0.05% and 0.25% of total U.S. passenger enplanements.
    - N: Nonhub that accounts for less than 0.05% of total U.S. passenger enplanements, but more than 10,000 annual enplanements.
  - CS: Commercial service – nonprimary are publicly owned airports that receive scheduled passenger service and have at least 2,500 passenger boardings each year.
  - R: Reliever airports are designated by the FAA to relieve congestion at a large commercial service airport and to provide more general aviation access to the overall community.
  - GA: General aviation airports are the largest single group of airports in the U.S. airport system. They are public-use airports that do not have scheduled service or have scheduled service with less than 2,500 passenger boardings each year.
- **Enplanements** – The number of enplanements (commercial passenger boardings) that occurred at the airport in calendar year 2024, as per FAA records released October 2025.

City served	FAA	IATA	ICAO	Airport name	Role	Enplanements (2024)
				**Commercial service – primary airports**		
Boulder City	BVU	**BLD**	KBVU	Boulder City Municipal Airport	P-N	59,617
Elko	EKO	EKO	KEKO	**Elko Regional Airport** (J.C. Harris Field)	P-N	12,881
Las Vegas	LAS	LAS	KLAS	**Harry Reid International Airport**	P-L	28,244,966
Reno	RNO	RNO	KRNO	**Reno/Tahoe International Airport**	P-S	2,377,780
				**Reliever airports**		
Carson City	CXP	CSN	KCXP	Carson City Airport	R	16
Las Vegas / Henderson	HND	**HSH**	KHND	Henderson Executive Airport	R	558
North Las Vegas	VGT	VGT	KVGT	North Las Vegas Airport	R	1,986
Reno	RTS		KRTS	Reno/Stead Airport	R	0
				**General aviation airports**		
Alamo	L92			Alamo Landing Field	GA	0
Austin	TMT	ASQ	KTMT	Austin Airport	GA	0
Battle Mountain	BAM	BAM	KBAM	Battle Mountain Airport	GA	56
Beatty	BTY	BTY	KBTY	Beatty Airport	GA	0
Ely	ELY	ELY	KELY	Ely Airport (Yelland Field)	GA	1
Eureka	05U	EUE		Eureka Airport	GA	0
Fallon	FLX	FLX	KFLX	Fallon Municipal Airport	GA	0
Gabbs	GAB	GAB	KGAB	Gabbs Airport	GA	0
Hawthorne	HTH	HTH	KHTH	Hawthorne Industrial Airport (was Hawthorne Municipal)	GA	0
Jackpot	06U	KPT		Jackpot Airport (Hayden Field)	GA	0
Jean	0L7			Jean Airport	GA	0
Lovelock	LOL	LOL	KLOL	Derby Field	GA	0
Mesquite	67L	MFH		Mesquite Airport	GA	114
Minden	MEV	MEV	KMEV	Minden–Tahoe Airport	GA	85
Overton	U08			Overton Municipal Airport (Perkins Field)	GA	0
Owyhee	10U			Owyhee Airport	GA	0
Panaca	1L1			Lincoln County Airport	GA	0
Silver Springs	SPZ		KSPZ	Silver Springs Airport	GA	0
Tonopah	TPH	TPH	KTPH	Tonopah Airport	GA	0
Wells	LWL	LWL	KLWL	Wells Municipal Airport (Harriet Field)	GA	0
Winnemucca	WMC	WMC	KWMC	Winnemucca Municipal Airport (Franklin Field)	GA	3
Yerington	O43			Yerington Municipal Airport	GA	0
				**Other public use-airports** (not listed in NPIAS)		
Cal-Nev-Ari	1L4			Kidwell Airport		
Crescent Valley	U74			Crescent Valley Airport		
Currant	9U7			Currant Ranch Airport		
Dayton / Carson City	A34			Dayton Valley Airpark		12
Denio	E85			Denio Junction Airport		
Duckwater	01U			Duckwater Airport		
Dyer	2Q9			Dyer Airport		
Fernley	N58			Samsarg Field		
Goldfield	0L4			Lida Junction Airport		
Kingston	N15			Kingston Airport		
Mina	3Q0			Mina Airport		
North Fork	08U			Stevens–Crosby Airport		
Overton	0L9			Echo Bay Airport		
Reno / Spanish Springs	N86			Spanish Springs Airport		
Sandy Valley	3L2			Sky Ranch Airport		
Searchlight	1L3			Searchlight Airport		
Smith	N59			Rosaschi Air Park		
				**Other government/military airports**		
Fallon	NFL	NFL	KNFL	NAS Fallon (Van Voorhis Field)		123
Indian Springs	INS	INS	KINS	Creech Air Force Base (Indian Springs AF Aux.)		77
Las Vegas	LSV	LSV	KLSV	Nellis Air Force Base		1,565
Mercury	NV65	DRA		Desert Rock Airport (owned by U.S. DOE, was FAA: DRA)		
Mercury	L23			Pahute Mesa Airstrip (owned by U.S. Dept of Energy)		
Mercury	NV11	UCC		Yucca Airstrip (owned by U.S. Dept of Energy)		
Tonopah	TNX	XSD	KTNX	Tonopah Test Range Airport		
Area 51			KXTA	Homey Airport		
				**Proposed airports**		
Las Vegas				Ivanpah Valley Airport		
				**Notable private-use airports**		
Carson City	25NV			Parker Carson Airport (was Parker Carson STOLport)		
Empire	18NV			Empire Airport		
Gerlach	88NV			Black Rock City Airport		461
Pahrump	74P			Calvada Meadows Airport (was NV74)		5
Pahrump	NV00			Valley View Airport		
Round Mountain	NV83			Hadley Airport (formerly public-use, was FAA: A36)		
				**Notable former airports**		
Alamo				Delamar Lake Landing Strip		
Amargosa Valley	~~U75~~			Jackass Aeropark (closed 2004?)		
Bonnie Claire				Bonnie Claire Airport (Scottys Airport)		
Bonnie Claire				Bonnie Claire Lake Landing Strip		
Boulder City				Boulder City Airport (operated 1933 – c. 1988)		
Buffalo Valley				Buffalo Valley Intermediate Field (closed 1948–1954?)		
Caliente	~~0L2~~			Caliente Flight Strip (Delamar Landing Field) (closed 1990s?)		
Goldfield	~~0L5~~			Goldfield Airport (closed 2007?)	~~GA~~	
Las Vegas				Anderson Field (Rockwell Field) (closed 1929)		
Las Vegas				Barton Field (closed 2004)		
Las Vegas				Sky Corral Airport (closed 1952?)		
Las Vegas				Voc-Tech Airfield (closed 1999?)		
Pahrump				Chicken Ranch Airfield (closed 2004)		
Pahrump	~~L57~~			Hidden Hills Airport		
Pioche	~~11U~~			Pioche Municipal Airport (closed 1994?)		

== See also ==
- Essential Air Service
- Nevada World War II Army Airfields
- Wikipedia:WikiProject Aviation/Airline destination lists: North America#Nevada
