= Lida (disambiguation) =

Lida may refer to:

== Places ==
- Lida, Hrodna Voblast, Belarus
- Lida, Nevada, United States
  - Lida Junction Airport, Nevada, United States
- Lake Lida, Otter Tail County, Minnesota, United States
- Lida Township, Minnesota, United States

== People with the name ==
- Lida Abdul, Afghan artist
- Gwen Araujo, American murder victim nicknamed Lida
- Lida Baday (b. 1957), Canadian fashion designer
- Nikolai Vyacheslavich Romadov, Russian musician, uses the pseudonym Lida
- Lída Baarová (1914–2000), Czech actress
- Lida E. Harkins, American politician, Massachusetts House of Representatives
- Lida Shaw King (1868–1932), American classicist
- Lida Larrimore (born 1896), American author
- Lida Rose McCabe (1865-1938), American author, journalist, lecturer
- Lida Lee Tall (1873–1942), American educator
- Lida Yusupova (born 1961), Russian activist

== Education ==
- Lida, in Mandarin Chinese, is the colloquial name for some polytechnics and technology universities, including:
  - Beijing Institute of Technology
  - Hebei Polytechnic University
  - Hong Kong Polytechnic University
- Lida Hooe Elementary School, Dallas, Texas, United States

== Other uses ==
- LIDA (cognitive architecture), a cognitive architecture developed by Stan Franklin and colleagues at the University of Memphis
- Lida, brand of agricultural equipment produced by Belarus-based company Lidagroprommash
- LIDA, acronym for Linux Interactive DisAssembler
- Battle of Lida (disambiguation)
- Lida is a character in 2025 video game Pokémon Legends: Z-A

== See also ==
- Leda (disambiguation)
