= Cormorant Lake (Minnesota) =

Lake in the United States

- Big Cormorant Lake
- Location within Minnesota Location within the United States
- Location: Becker County, Minnesota
- Group: Cormorant Lakes
- Coordinates: 46°44′30″N 96°06′14″W
- Type: Lake
- Etymology: Cormorant, bird species
- Primary outflows: Spring Creek
- Basin countries: United States
- Managing agency: Minnesota DNR
- Max. length: 3.5 mi (6 km)
- Max. width: 2.5 mi (4 km)
- Surface area: 3,657 acres (1,480 ha)
- Average depth: 30 feet (9.1 m)
- Max. depth: 75 ft (23 m)
- Salinity: Freshwater
- Shore length^{1}: 18.7 mi (30 km)
- Surface elevation: 1,158 ft (353 m)
- Frozen: 5 Months
- Islands: 1
- Sections/sub-basins: Pikes Bay, Blue Water Bay, Glyndon Bay, Spring Creek Bay, Nelson Bay, Viking Bay
- Settlements: Cormorant Township
- Website: bigcormorantlake.org
- ^{1} Shore length is not a well-defined measure.

Big Cormorant Lake is located in northwestern Minnesota's Becker County, about an hour's drive due east of the Fargo, North Dakota and Moorhead, Minnesota metropolitan area. Public access boat ramps are located on the northeast and west sides of the Lake.

The lake was named after the cormorant, a common bird species in the region. In 2015, the lake was discovered to be infested with zebra mussels, which threatens neighboring lakes. Cormorant Lake is situated near the towns of Detroit Lakes, Minnesota, Lake Park, Minnesota, Audubon, Minnesota and the Cormorant Township.

== History ==
The land that Big Cormorant Lake sits on was originally occupied by the Chippewa (Ojibwe), and the Sioux Native tribes. The Cormorant Township was established on February 26, 1872, and the name Cormorant is translated from the original Ojibway name of the lake. In 1867, a treaty was signed establishing the White Earth Reservation, a large tract of land in the northern part of Becker County, to be home for the Chippewa Indians.

== Attractions and activities ==
Some of the most popular attractions on Big Cormorant Lake are restaurants. Cormorant Pub and Boat House, Parallel 46, Zorbaz on Pelican Lake, the Roadhouse, and Pit 611 offer lake residents food and entertainment. Boutique shopping is also available in Cormorant Village.

Founded in 1903, YMCA Camp Cormorant is one of the oldest overnight camps in the entire nation and continues to be a tremendous learning experience for children and teens. The camp is nestled on 80 acres (32 ha) of wooded property with an extensive beach front on Big Cormorant Lake. Boating, sailing, and fishing are the most common activities on Cormorant Lake. Other activities on Big Cormorant include swimming, kayaking, wakesurfing, waterskiing, wakeboarding and standup paddleboarding during the summer, as well as ice fishing and snowmobiling during the winter.

== In media ==
Cormorant Village went viral for electing a dog named Duke as Mayor for four terms. Duke was a Great Pyrenees and passed away on Feb 21, 2019.

A popular YouTube channel named CBOYSTV films is headquartered at Cormorant Lake. CBoysTV is an American comedy and motorsports channel run by five guys. Their channel has amassed over 5 million subscribers.

== Wildlife ==
=== Fish to catch ===
Source: MN DNR

- Black Bullhead
- Black Crappie
- Bluegill
- Brown Bullhead
- Carp
- Green Sunfish
- Hybrid Sunfish
- Largemouth Bass
- Northern Pike
- Pumpkinseed
- Rock Bass
- Smallmouth Bass
- Walleye
- White Sucker
- Yellow Bullhead
- Yellow Perch

=== Invasive species ===
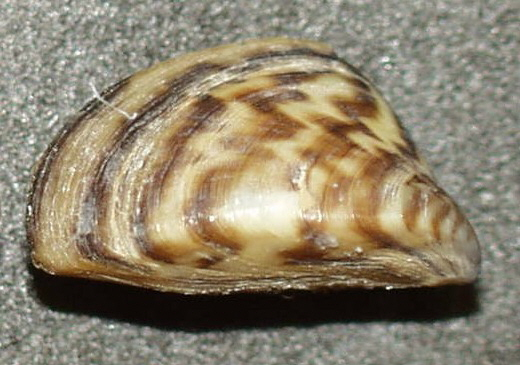
Zebra Mussel

- Zebra Mussel
- Eurasian Milfoil
- Spiny waterflea
- Starry Stonewort

== Climate ==
Because of its location in the Great Plains and its distance from both mountains and oceans, Cormorant Lake has an extreme humid continental climate (Köppen Dfa/Dfb), featuring long, bitterly cold winters and warm to hot, humid summers. Summers have frequent thunderstorms, and the warmest month of the year is July.

=== Temperature and precipitation ===
Climate data for Detroit Lakes, Minnesota (8 Miles West of Cormorant Lake)
| Month | Jan | Feb | Mar | Apr | May | Jun | Jul | Aug | Sep | Oct | Nov | Dec | Year |
|---|---|---|---|---|---|---|---|---|---|---|---|---|---|
| Record high °F (°C) | 55 (13) | 59 (15) | 74 (23) | 98 (37) | 97 (36) | 100 (38) | 107 (42) | 101 (38) | 98 (37) | 90 (32) | 72 (22) | 60 (16) | 107 (42) |
| Mean daily maximum °F (°C) | 19 (−7) | 26 (−3) | 37 (3) | 56 (13) | 69 (21) | 78 (26) | 82 (28) | 81 (27) | 71 (22) | 56 (13) | 38 (3) | 22 (−6) | 52.9 (11.6) |
| Mean daily minimum °F (°C) | −2 (−19) | 3 (−16) | 17 (−8) | 31 (−1) | 45 (7) | 55 (13) | 60 (16) | 58 (14) | 47 (8) | 35 (2) | 21 (−6) | 5 (−15) | 31.3 (−0.4) |
| Record low °F (°C) | −45 (−43) | −46 (−43) | −40 (−40) | −11 (−24) | 15 (−9) | 28 (−2) | 33 (1) | 32 (0) | 17 (−8) | 1 (−17) | −28 (−33) | −41 (−41) | −46 (−43) |
| Average precipitation inches (mm) | 0.76 (19) | 0.57 (14) | 1.15 (29) | 1.54 (39) | 2.97 (75) | 4.41 (112) | 4.03 (102) | 3.67 (93) | 3.02 (77) | 2.50 (64) | 1.10 (28) | 0.64 (16) | 26.36 (670) |
Source: usclimatedata.com

=== Ice In - Out ===
Source: Archived site of Big Cormorant

1980s
| Year | Out | In |
|---|---|---|
| 1980 | N/A | N/A |
| 1981 | N/A | N/A |
| 1982 | N/A | N/A |
| 1983 | N/A | N/A |
| 1984 | N/A | Dec 1 |
| 1985 | April 21 | Nov 20 |
| 1986 | April 18 | Nov 18 |
| 1987 | April 13 | Dec 2 |
| 1988 | April 18 | Nov 26 |
| 1989 | April 19 | Nov 23 |

1990s
| Year | Out | In |
|---|---|---|
| 1990 | April 5 | Dec 1 |
| 1991 | April 19 | Dec 23 |
| 1992 | N/A | N/A |
| 1993 | N/A | N/A |
| 1994 | N/A | N/A |
| 1995 | April 22 | Nov 24 |
| 1996 | April 20 | Nov 18 |
| 1997 | May 4 | Nov 24 |
| 1998 | April 12 | Dec 19 |
| 1999 | April 17 | N/A |

2000s
| Year | Out | In |
|---|---|---|
| 2000 | April 5 | Dec 1 |
| 2001 | April 29 | Dec 19 |
| 2002 | April 18 | Nov 25 |
| 2003 | April 15 | Nov 29 |
| 2004 | April 19 | Dec 13 |
| 2005 | April 15–17 | Dec 1 |
| 2006 | April 13 | Nov 30 |
| 2007 | April 26 | Dec 4 |
| 2008 | May 7 | Nov 28 |
| 2009 | April 29 | Dec 5 |

2010s
| Year | Out | In |
|---|---|---|
| 2010 | April 3 | Nov 27 |
| 2011 | April 29 | Dec 5 |
| 2012 | March 25 | Dec 5 |
| 2013 | N/A | N/A |
| 2014 | N/A | N/A |
| 2015 | April 16 | Dec 21 |
| 2016 | April 6 | Dec 10 |
| 2017 | April 8 | Dec 7 |
| 2018 | May 3 | Nov 19 |
| 2019 | May 2 | Dec 4 |

2020s
| Year | Out | In |
|---|---|---|
| 2020 | April 29 | Dec 15 |
| 2021 | April 7 | Dec 7 |
| 2022 | May 8 | Nov 19 |
| 2023 | May 8 | |
| 2024 | | |
| 2025 | | |
| 2026 | | |
| 2027 | | |
| 2028 | | |
| 2029 | | |

== Neighboring lakes ==
- Leaf Lake (Becker County Minnesota)
- Pelican Lake (Otter Tail County, Minnesota)
- Little Cormorant Lake
- Middle Cormorant Lake
- Upper Cormorant Lake
- Lake Ida
- Lake Maud
- Lake Nelson

== Adjacent townships ==
- Cormorant Township (south)
- Lake Park Township (north)
- Audubon Township (northeast)
- Lake Eunice Township (east)
- Dunn Township, Otter Tail County (southeast)
- Scambler Township, Otter Tail County (south)
- Tansem Township, Clay County (southwest)
- Parke Township, Clay County (west)
- Eglon Township, Clay County (northwest)

== See also ==
- List of lakes in Minnesota
