= Twin Rivers =

Twin Rivers may refer to:

- Twin Rivers, East Riding of Yorkshire, England
- Twin Rivers, New Jersey, United States
- Twin Rivers (film), a 2007 Australian film
- Longford River and Duke of Northumberlands River near Heathrow Airport, London
  - Twin Rivers Diversion Scheme, part of the construction of Terminal 5 at Heathrow Airport
- North Twin River and South Twin River, Nevada, United States
- East Twin River and West Twin River, Wisconsin, United States
- East Twin River and West Twin River, Washington, United States

== See also ==
- Twin River, British Columbia, Canada
