= Cormorant Lake =

Cormorant Lake or Lake Cormorant may refer to:

- Cormorant Lake (Manitoba)
- Cormorant Lake (Minnesota)
- Lake Cormorant, Mississippi, an unincorporated community in DeSoto County

== See also ==
- Cormorant Lakes, a group of lakes in Minnesota
