= Lake Lizzie =

Lake in the state of Minnesota, United States

- Location within Minnesota Location within the United States
- Location: Otter Tail County, Minnesota
- Coordinates: 46.6279°N 96.0157°W
- Basin countries: United States
- Surface area: 4,035 acres (16.3 km^{2})
- Average depth: 66 ft (20 m)
- Islands: 2

Lake Lizzie is a lake located in the townships of Dunn and Lida in Otter Tail County, Minnesota.

== Size and shape ==
The lake covers an area of 4,035 acres (16.33 km^{2}), and reaches a maximum depth of 66 feet (20 m) in the northern portion of the lake. The lake is in the shape of the letter L. Whether this has anything to do with the first letter of its name is unclear. The southern portion of the lake is very shallow with a depth rarely exceeding ten feet, and is nearly covered with water-dwelling plants that penetrate the surface to give it a swamp-like appearance. The northern half of the lake, however, is quite deep for its size.

== Neighboring lakes ==
Lake Lizzie is nearly surrounded by other lakes. To the south, it is connected to Lake Lida by an unnavigable culvert under County Highway 4. To the east lies Lake Crystal, which connected by a navigable culvert under County Road 31. Lizzie is also connected to Pelican Lake to the northwest, via the Pelican River.
