= Crystal Lake (Otter Tail, Minnesota) =

Lake in the state of Minnesota, United States

- Location within Minnesota
- Location: Otter Tail County, Minnesota
- Coordinates: 46.6148881°N 95.9505321°W
- Type: natural freshwater lake
- Basin countries: United States
- Max. length: 1.77 miles (2.85 km)
- Max. width: 1.39 miles (2.24 km)
- Surface area: 1,317 acres (5 km^{2})
- Max. depth: 55 ft (17 m)
- Surface elevation: 1,463 feet (446 m)
- Islands: 1

Crystal Lake is a lake located in Lida Township in Otter Tail County, Minnesota, USA.

== Size and shape ==
Crystal Lake is an almost circular lake, covering an area of 1,317 acres (5 km^{2}) and reaching a maximum depth of 55 feet (17 m). Despite the said maximum depth, 51 percent of the lake is less than 15 ft (5 m) in depth.

== Location ==
To the west is Lake Lizzie, which is connected to Crystal Lake by a navigable culvert under County Road 31. The larger Lake Lida lies close to the south of the lake, but is not connected directly. Smaller Lake Franklin is located to the northwest.
