= N58 =

N58 may refer to:

== Roads ==
- N58 road (Ireland)
- Santa Rosa–Tarlac Road, in the Philippines
- Nebraska Highway 58, in the United States

== Other uses ==
- N58 (Long Island bus)
- HMS Oswald (N58), a submarine of the Royal Navy
- Tiger Field, in Lyon County, Nevada, United States
