= KLWL =

KLWL may refer to:

- KLWL (FM), a radio station (88.1 FM) licensed to serve Chillicothe, Missouri, United States
- Wells Municipal Airport (Nevada) (ICAO code KLWL)
