= West Twin River =

The West Twin River may refer to any of the following rivers in the United States:

- West Twin River (Washington)
- West Twin River (Wisconsin)
