= Pelican Lake (Otter Tail County, Minnesota) =

Lake in the state of Minnesota, United States

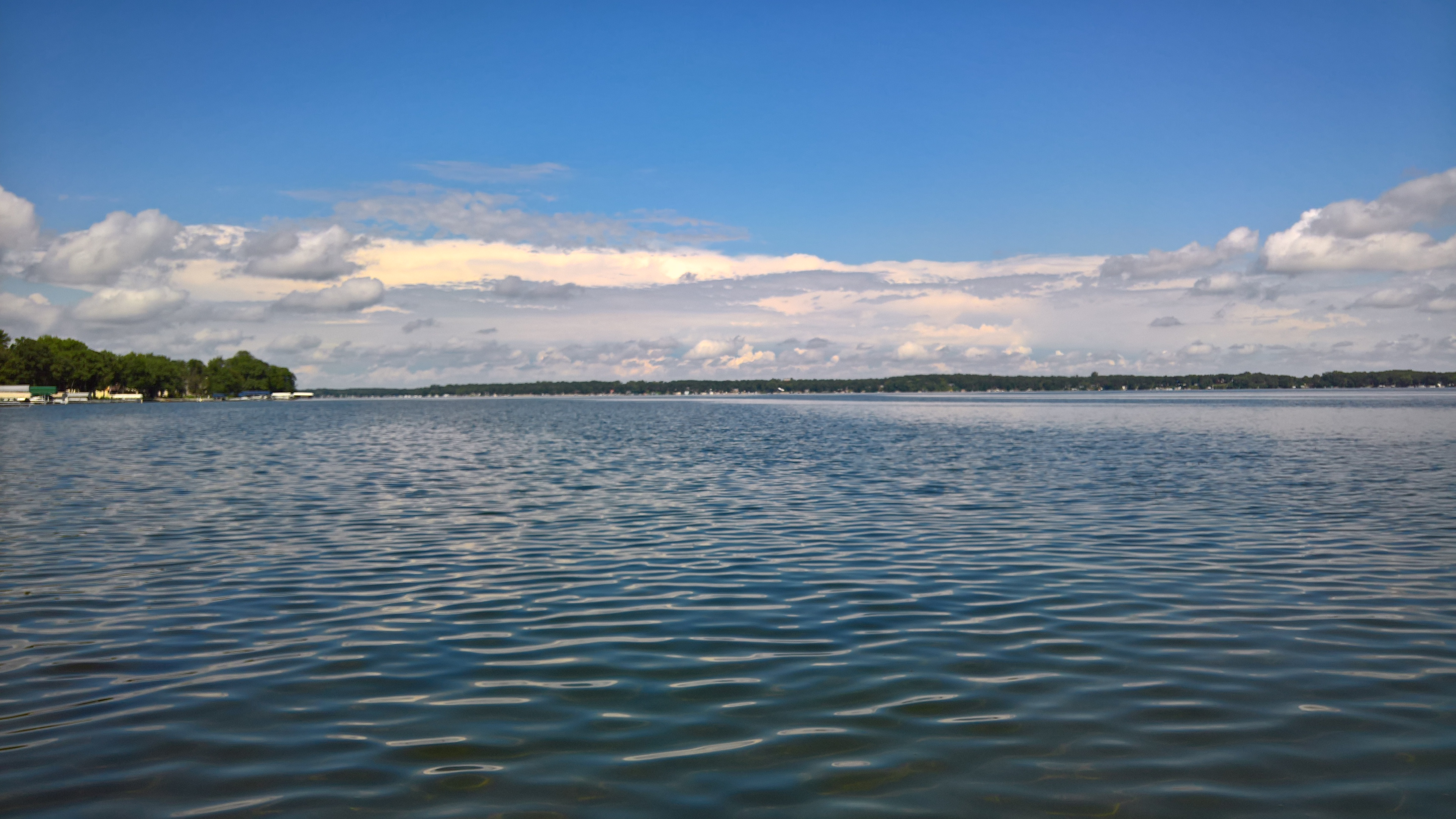
- Pelican Lake in August 2016

- Location within Minnesota Location within the United States
- Location: Otter Tail County, Minnesota
- Coordinates: 46.698553°N 96.023127°W
- Primary inflows: Pelican River, Spring Creek
- Primary outflows: Pelican River
- Basin countries: United States
- Surface area: 3,986 acres (16.13 km^{2})
- Max. depth: 55 ft (17 m)

Pelican Lake is a lake located about seven miles north of Pelican Rapids, in Otter Tail County, Minnesota, United States. Pelican Lake is now a highly developed lake with its major uses predominantly recreation, but its fishing is also excellent. The lake was recently discovered to be infested with zebra mussels, threatening not only Pelican Lake, but all lakes connected by the Pelican River.

== Size and shape ==
The lake covers an area of 3,986 acres (16.13 km^{2}), and reaches a maximum depth of 64 ft (20 m) in the northern portion of the lake. The lake got its name because of its unique and very intricate resemblance to the shape of a pelican.

== Neighboring lakes ==
The Pelican River runs through the lake and forces water southeastward into Lake Lizzie. Little Pelican Lake is located to the northeast and is navigable by going upstream on the Pelican River. There is a water inflow coming from the Spring Creek that feeds from Cormorant Lake (Minnesota)

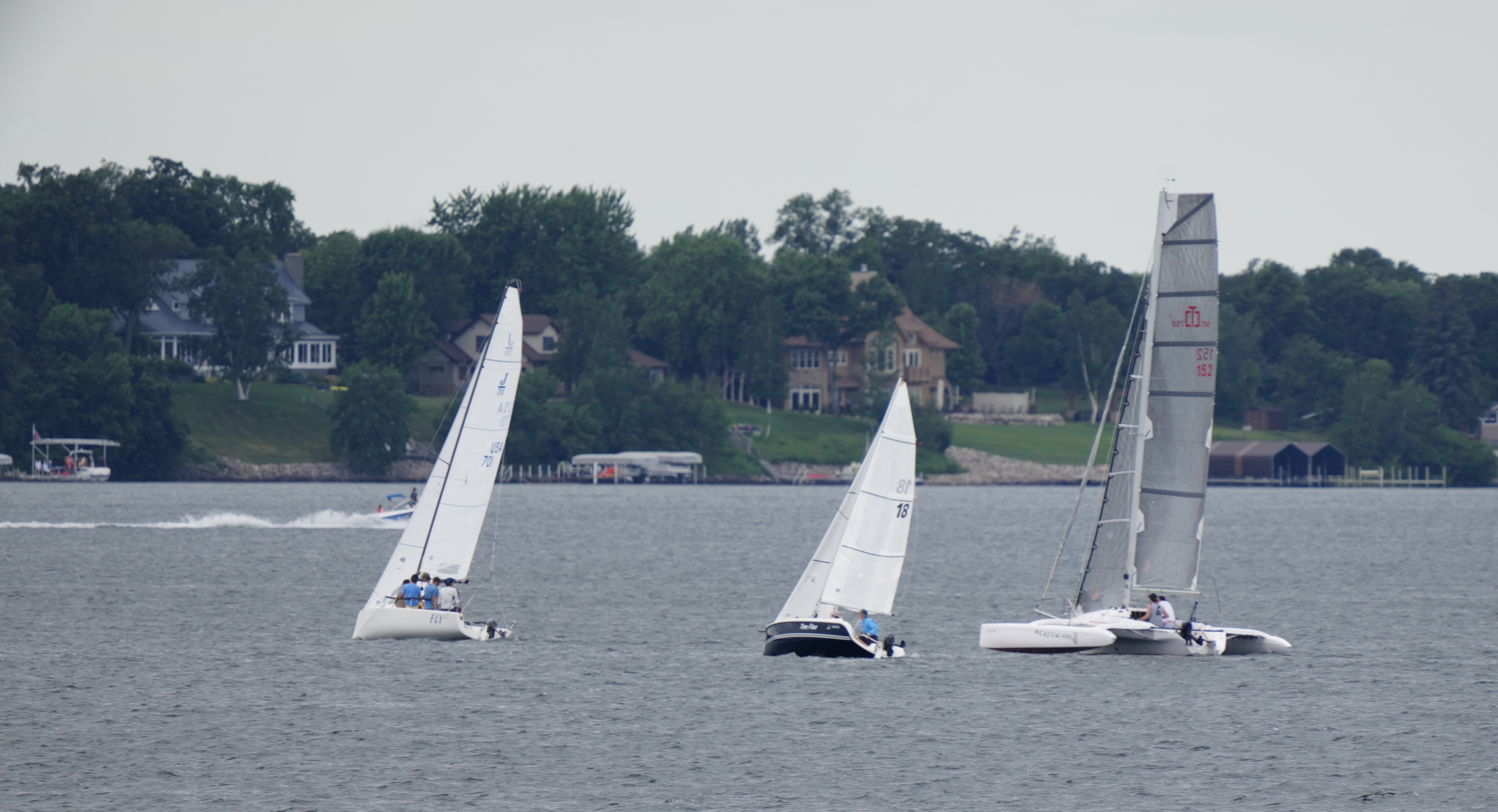
Pelican Lake, Minnesota July 3, 2022

== Recreation ==
A popular family resort by the name of Fair Hills Resort is located on the lake.

== Barry's Mansion ==
Barry's Mansion is an estate built by businessman and philanthropist B. John Barry starting in 1998.

== Notable People with Second Homes on Pelican Lake ==
- Doug Burgum, Governor of North Dakota
- Dave Hakstol, former coach for the Seattle Kraken
- John Barry, former owner of Sun Country Airlines
