= N86 =

N86 may refer to:

- Escadrille N.86, a unit of the French Air Force
- HMS Tempest (N86), a submarine of the Royal Navy
- London Buses route N86
- N86 road (Ireland)
- Nokia N86 8MP, a smartphone
- Spanish Springs Airport, in Washoe County, Nevada, United States
- Volvo N86, a Swedish truck
