= Big Smoky Valley =

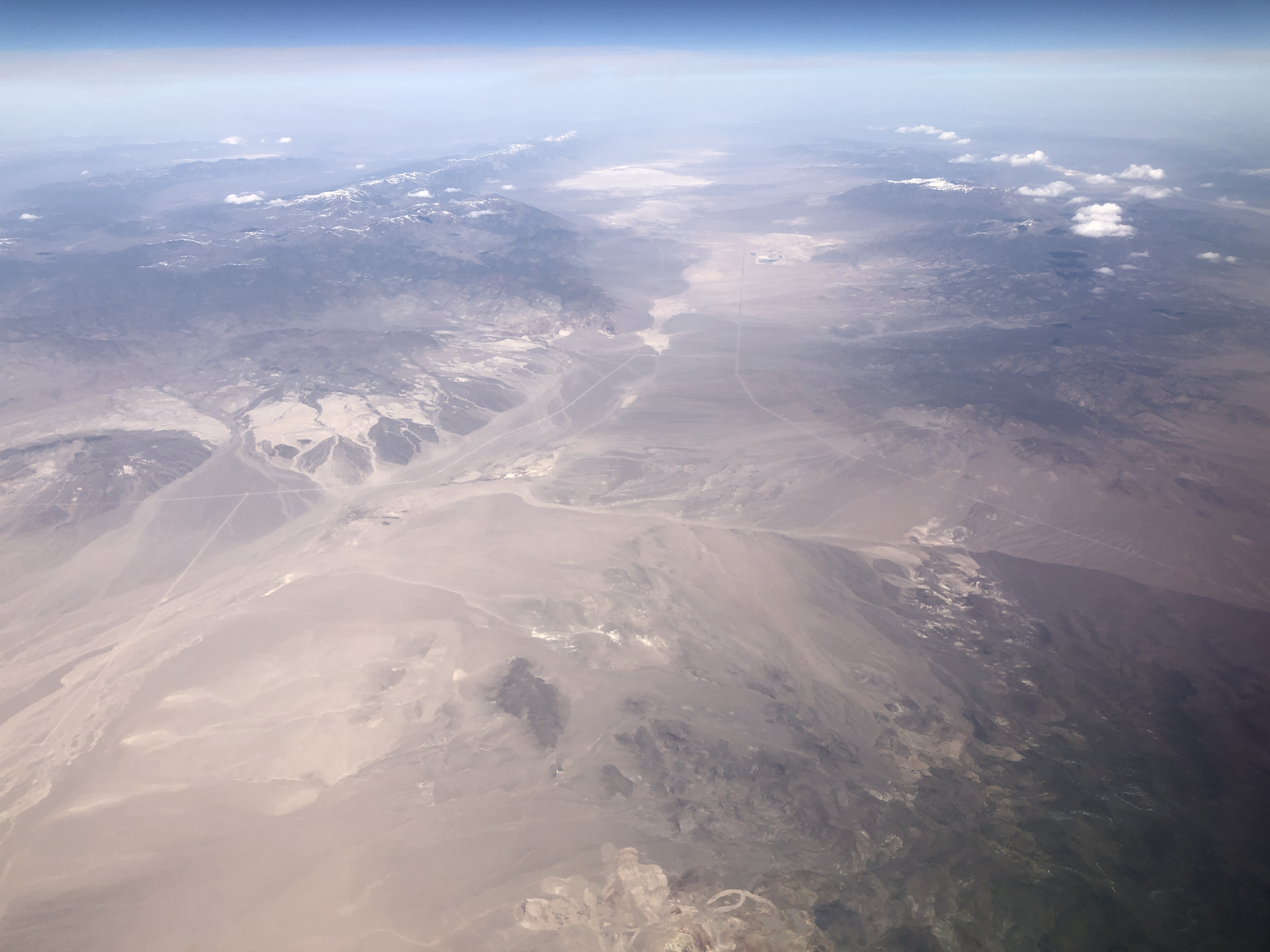
- Aerial view of Big Smoky Valley looking north

- Location within Nevada
- Area: 4,960 mi^{2} (12,800 km^{2}) (watersheds' area)

Geography
- Location: saddle of drainage divide (south of the Hadley Airport)
- Country: United States
- State: Nevada
- Region: Northern and Southern; Big Smoky Valley watersheds
- Coordinates: 38.664436°N 117.171078°W
- Interactive map of Big Smoky Valley

Nevada Historical Marker
- Reference no.: 42

The Big Smoky Valley is a landform of the Tonopah Basin between the Toiyabe and Toquima mountain ranges. It is about 100 miles (160 km) in length.

Big Smoky Valley was named after the haze that frequently settled there. It is known by other names (some with different spellings): including Great Smoky Valley, Smokey Valley, Smoky Valley, Wen-A-No-Nu-Fee Valley, and Won-A-No-Nu-Fee Valley. The U.S. Geological Survey usually refers to it as "Big Smoky Valley," but the chamber of commerce in the valley calls itself the Greater Smoky Valley Chamber of Commerce.

Approximately 2,500 people live in the valley, which has seven small communities. There is an open-pit gold mine at the southern end of the valley, and local industry includes mining, agriculture, and ranching. The valley traverses three counties: Esmeralda, Nye, and Lander. Average yearly precipitation in most of the valley is less than 10 inches (25 cm). The North and South Twin Rivers flow into the Big Smoky Valley—the latter at an elevation of 6,401 feet (1,951 m)—and the water is completely diverted except during periods of high flow.

The American Discovery Trail crosses the Big Smoky Valley from Jefferson to Carvers and on to South Twin Campground.
