= Cormorant Lakes =

Series of lakes in Minnesota, United States

- Location within Minnesota Location within the United States
- Interactive map of Cormorant Lakes
- Location: Becker County, Minnesota
- Coordinates: 46.7967°N 96.0047°W
- Type: Ephemeral lake
- Part of: Cormorant Lakes Watershed District
- Basin countries: United States
- Surface area: Cormorant Lake: 3,657 acres (1,480 ha); Little Cormorant Lake: 924 acres (374 ha); Upper Cormorant Lake: 926 acres (375 ha); Midde Cormorant Lake: 373 acres (151 ha)
- Max. depth: Cormorant Lake: 30 feet (9.1 m); Little Cormorant Lake: 35 feet (11 m); Upper Cormorant Lake: 29 feet (8.8 m); Midde Cormorant Lake: 40 feet (12 m)
- Salinity: Freshwater
- Surface elevation: 1,158 feet (353 m)
- Settlements: Audubon, Minnesota

The Cormorant Lakes are a series of freshwater lakes situated in North Western Minnesota. The Lakes include Cormorant Lake (Minnesota), Little Cormorant Lake, Upper Cormorant Lake, and Middle Cormorant Lake. The lakes are located in Becker County, Minnesota.
