= Parker Carson Airport =

- IATA: none; ICAO: none; FAA LID: 25NV (formerly 2Q5)

Summary
- Airport type: Public use
- Owner: Steve Ryckebosch
- Serves: Carson City, Nevada
- Elevation AMSL: 4,939 ft / 1,505 m
- Coordinates: 39°12′06″N 119°41′00″W

Map
- Location of airport in Nevada

Runways
Direction	Length		Surface
Direction	ft	m	Surface
6/24	815	248	Gravel

Statistics (2000)
- Aircraft operations: 1,500
- Based aircraft: 5
- Source: Federal Aviation Administration

Parker Carson Airport (FAA LID: 25NV (formerly 2Q5)) is a privately owned, public use airport located five nautical miles (6 mi, 9 km) east of the central business district of Carson City, Nevada, United States. It was formerly known as Parker Carson STOLport.

== Facilities and aircraft ==
Parker Carson Airport covers an area of 14 acres (6 ha) at an elevation of 4,939 feet (1,505 m) above mean sea level. It has one runway designated 6/24 with a gravel surface measuring 815 by 40 feet (248 x 12 m). This runway was formerly 1,700 feet (518 m) in length.

For the 12-month period ending June 12, 2000, the airport had 1,500 general aviation aircraft operations, an average of 125 per month. At that time there were 5 aircraft based at this airport: 60% ultralight and 40% single-engine.

== See also ==
- List of airports in Nevada
