= Mina Airport =

- IATA: none; ICAO: none; FAA LID: 3QØ

Summary
- Airport type: Public
- Owner: U.S. Bureau of Land Management
- Serves: Mina, Nevada
- Elevation AMSL: 4,552 ft / 1,387 m
- Coordinates: 38°22′47″N 118°05′47″W

Map
- Location of airport in Nevada 3QØ (the United States)

Runways
Direction	Length		Surface
Direction	ft	m	Surface
13/31	4,600	1,402	Dirt

Statistics (2012)
- Aircraft operations: 175
- Based aircraft: 3
- Source: Federal Aviation Administration

Mina Airport (FAA LID: 3QØ) is a public use airport located southeast of Mina, in Mineral County, Nevada, United States. It is owned by U.S. Bureau of Land Management (BLM).

== Facilities and aircraft ==
Mina Airport covers an area of 29 acres (12 ha) at an elevation of 4,552 feet (1,387 m) above mean sea level. It has one runway designated 13/31 with a dirt surface measuring 4,600 by 165 feet (1,402 x 50 m).

This runway was originally graded for use as an auxiliary field of the Tonopah Army Air Field to the southeast.

For the 12-month period ending August 31, 2012, the airport had 175 general aviation aircraft operations, an average of 14 per month. At that time there were three aircraft based at this airport: 67% single-engine and 33% ultralight.

== See also ==
- List of airports in Nevada
