= Fallon Municipal Airport =

- IATA: FLX; ICAO: KFLX; FAA LID: FLX

Summary
- Airport type: Public
- Owner: City of Fallon
- Serves: Fallon, Nevada
- Elevation AMSL: 3,966 ft (1,209 m)
- Coordinates: 39°29′57″N 118°44′56″W
- Interactive map of Fallon Municipal Airport

Runways
Direction	Length		Surface
Direction	ft	m	Surface
3/21	5,705	1,739	Asphalt
13/31	3,581	1,091	Dirt

Statistics (2021)
- Aircraft operations (year ending 2/28/2021): 9,240
- Based aircraft: 79
- Source: Federal Aviation Administration

Fallon Municipal Airport (IATA: FLX, ICAO: KFLX, FAA LID: FLX) is two miles northeast of Fallon, in Churchill County, Nevada.

== Facilities ==
The airport covers 440 acres (180 ha) at an elevation of 3,966 feet (1,209 m). It has two runways: 3/21 is 5,705 by 75 feet (1,739 x 23 m) asphalt; 13/31 is 3,581 by 100 feet (1,091 x 30 m) dirt.

In the year ending February 28, 2021 the airport had 9,240 aircraft operations, average 25 per day: 84% general aviation, 8% air taxi, and 8% military. 79 aircraft were then based at this airport: 75 single-engine, 2 multi-engine, and 2 helicopter.

== See also ==
- List of airports in Nevada
