= Austin Airport (Nevada) =

- IATA: ASQ; ICAO: KTMT; FAA LID: TMT

Summary
- Airport type: Public
- Owner: U.S. Bureau of Land Management
- Serves: Austin, Nevada
- Elevation AMSL: 5,735 ft (1,748 m)
- Coordinates: 39°28′05″N 117°11′51″W

Map
- Location within Nevada Location within the United States

Runways
Direction	Length		Surface
Direction	ft	m	Surface
18/36	5,999	1,828	Asphalt

Statistics (2020)
- Aircraft operations (year ending 6/24/2020): 3,720
- Based aircraft: 4
- Source: Federal Aviation Administration

Austin Airport (IATA: ASQ, ICAO: KTMT, FAA LID: TMT, formerly 9U3) is a public use airport owned by the U.S. Bureau of Land Management five miles southwest of Austin, in Lander County, Nevada.

Many U.S. airports use the same three-letter location identifier for the FAA and IATA, but this airport is TMT to the FAA and ASQ to the IATA (which assigned TMT to Porto Trombetas Airport in Pará, Brazil).

== Facilities ==
Austin Airport covers 1,205 acres (488 ha) at an elevation of 5,735 feet (1,748 m). Its single runway, 18/36, is 5,999 by 75 feet (1,829 x 23 m).

In the year ending June 24, 2020, the airport had 3,720 aircraft operations, average 71 per month: 84% general aviation, 10% air taxi, and 7% military. Four aircraft were then based at this airport, all single-engine.

== See also ==
- List of airports in Nevada
