= Cottontail Ranch =

Legal brothel in Lida Junction, Nevada

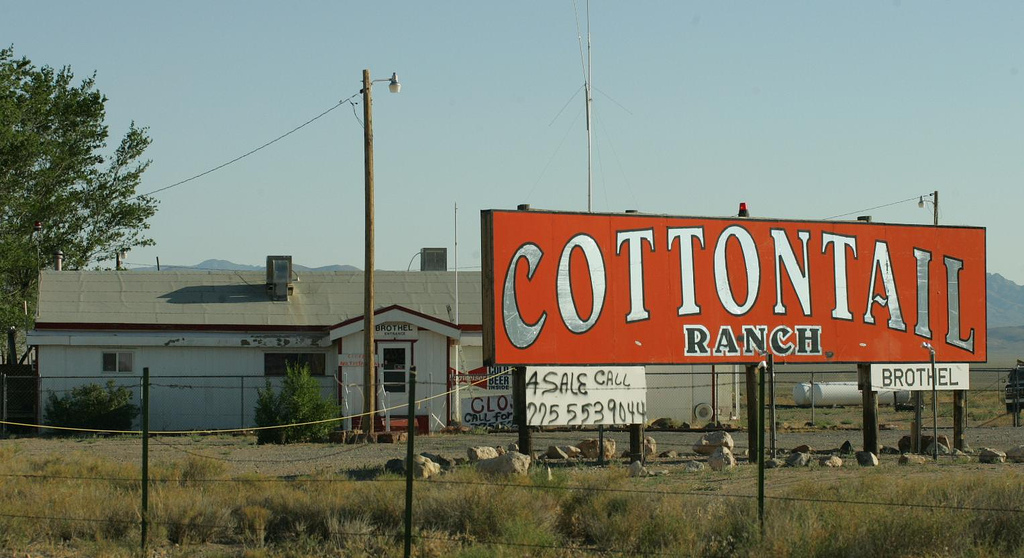
- The Cottontail Ranch in 2006. The "for sale" telephone number listed belongs to the adjacent Lida Junction Airport.

- Location in Nevada
- Location: Lida Junction, Nevada
- Coordinates: 37°30′03.1″N 117°11′06.95″W

Construction
- Opened: October 1967
- Closed: 2004
- Demolished: 2022

Cottontail Ranch was a legal, licensed brothel in Nevada that opened in October 1967. Located near the intersection of U.S. Route 95 and State Route 266 known as Lida Junction, in Esmeralda County, Nevada. It was also known as the Cottontail Ranch Club.

== History ==
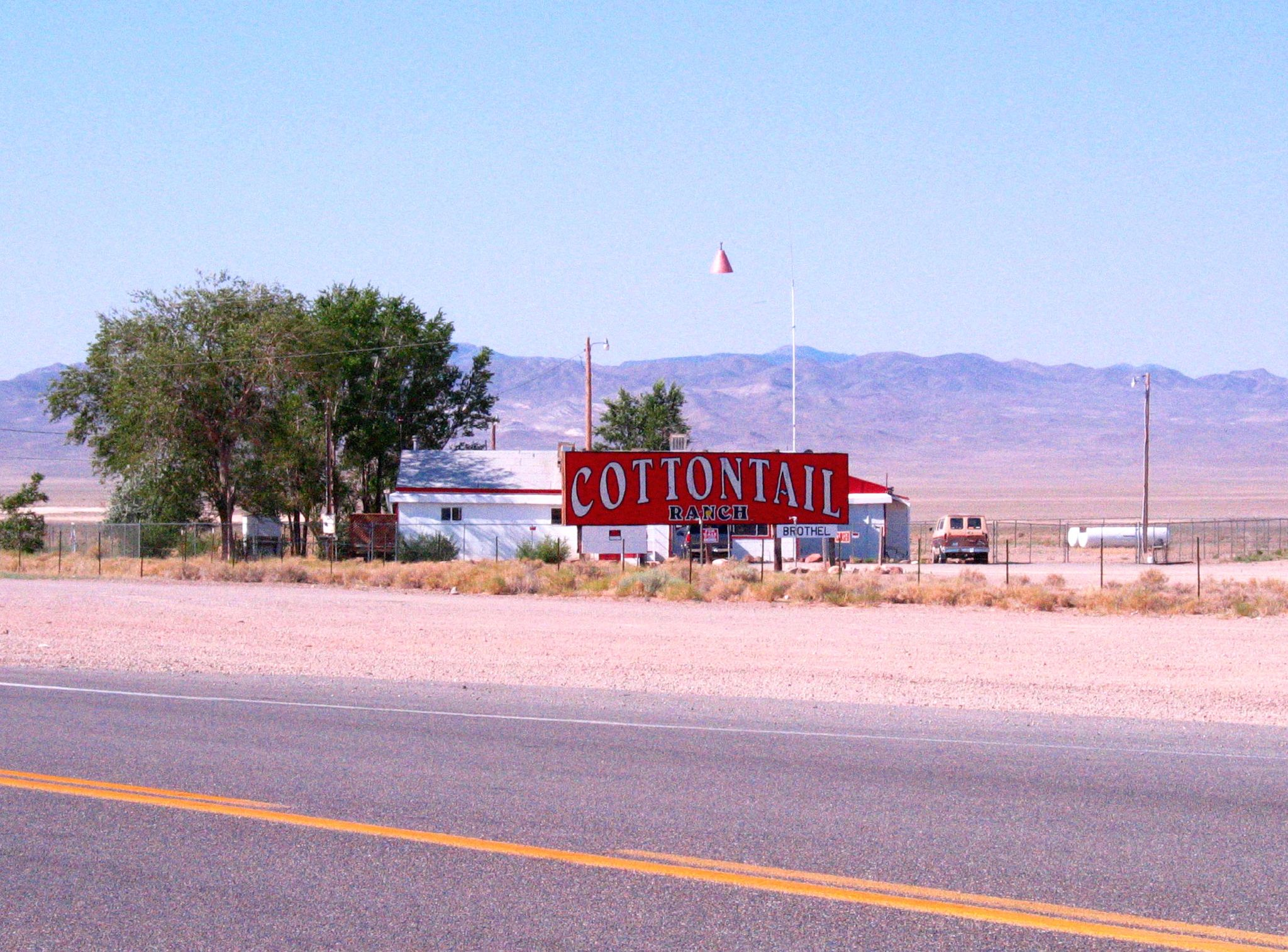
Another view of the brothel

In 1967, Howard Hughes allegedly made several visits to the Cottontail Ranch for entertainment while he was living in Las Vegas.

In the 1970s, then madam Beverly Harrell battled with the United States Bureau of Land Management which was attempting to have the brothel removed from federal land. Harrell also was a candidate for the Nevada Assembly in 1974. She published a book about the Ranch, An Orderly House, in 1975 (ISBN 0440058856).

A record, Coming My Way, was released in 1976 and was a collection of stories by the employees of the brothel. This recording was rereleased in 2023 by Ghost State Records with additional new historical writings and photographs contained in the liner notes.

Howard Harrell operated the brothel before selling the Cottontail.

The Cottontail Ranch was closed in 2004 when the madam retired. All the real estate was purchased by real estate investor Lanny D. Love; Miss Love also purchased a luxury ranch called Lida Ranch a few miles from the brothel. And an additional 3,300 acres (1,300 ha) in a ghost town called Lida.

A fire destroyed what was left of the Cottontail Ranch in Esmeralda County on September 5, 2022. The land remains for sale.

== See also ==
- List of brothels in Nevada
- Prostitution in Nevada
