= Goldfield Airport =

- IATA: none; ICAO: none; FAA LID: ØL5

Summary
- Airport type: Public
- Owner: Esmeralda County
- Serves: Goldfield, Nevada
- Elevation AMSL: 5,680 ft / 1,731 m
- Coordinates: 37°43′21″N 117°14′11″W

Map
- Location of airport in Nevada

Runways
Direction	Length		Surface
Direction	ft	m	Surface
17/35	3,150	960	Gravel

Statistics (2005)
- Aircraft operations: 300
- Sources: FAA, Nevada DOT

Goldfield Airport (FAA LID: 0L5) was a county-owned, public-use airport located 1 nautical mile (1.9 km; 1.2 mi) north of the central business district of Goldfield, the county seat of Esmeralda County, Nevada, United States. The airport closed in 2007.

Esmeralda county is exploring opening the airport again for public use. However, there is questions to the legality of the land owned, The county states that all the land is public land. But the bureau of land management claims that the airport cannot be reopened until all mineral rights are resolved.

== Facilities and aircraft ==
Goldfield Airport covered an area of 145 acres (59 ha) at an elevation of 5,680 feet (1,731 m) above mean sea level. It has one runway designated 17/35 with a gravel surface measuring 3,150 by 37 feet (960 x 11 m). For the 12-month period ending June 30, 2005, the airport had 300 general aviation aircraft operations, an average of 25 per month: 92% local and 8% transient.

== See also ==
- Lida Junction Airport
