= Sky Ranch Airport (Nevada) =

- IATA: none; ICAO: none; FAA LID: 3L2

Summary
- Airport type: Public use
- Owner: Sky Ranch Homeowners Association
- Serves: Sandy Valley, Nevada
- Elevation AMSL: 2,599 ft / 792 m
- Coordinates: 35°47′35″N 115°37′35″W

Map
- Location of airport in Nevada 3L2 (the United States)

Runways
Direction	Length		Surface
Direction	ft	m	Surface
3/21	3,340	1,018	Asphalt
12/30	3,300	1,006	Dirt

Statistics (2022)
- Aircraft operations (year ending 7/26/2022): 4,960
- Based aircraft: 92
- Source: Federal Aviation Administration

Sky Ranch Airport (FAA LID: 3L2), also known as Sky Ranch Estates or Aérodrome de Sky Ranch, is a privately owned, public use airport located two nautical miles (4 km) southwest of the central business district of Sandy Valley, a town in Clark County, Nevada, United States.

This field should not be confused with the former Sky Ranch Airport (1930s - 1970) which was located 7 miles (11 km) north of Sparks, Nevada, at which the first two "Reno" National Air Races were flown.

== Facilities and aircraft ==
Sky Ranch Airport covers an area of 158 acres (64 ha) at an elevation of 2,599 feet (792 m) above mean sea level. It has two runways: 3/21 is 3,340 by 45 feet (1,018 x 14 m) with an asphalt surface and 12/30 is 3,300 by 105 feet (1,006 x 32 m) with a dirt surface.

For the 12-month period ending July 26, 2022, the airport had a total of 4,960 aircraft operations, 4,720 general aviation aircraft operations, 180 military aircraft operations, and 60 air taxi aircraft operations, an average of 95 per week. At that time there were 92 aircraft based at this airport: 80 single-engine, 5 multi-engine, 5 ultralight, and 2 helicopter.

== See also ==
- List of airports in Nevada
