= Kenneth Russell Unger =

American World War I flying ace

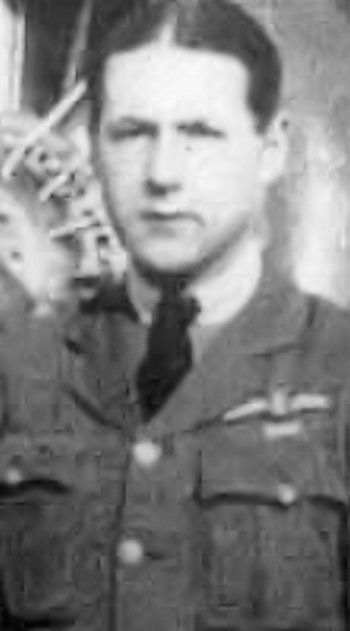
- Kenneth Russell Unger, 1918
- Born: 19 April 1898; Newark, New Jersey, USA
- Died: 6 January 1979 (aged 80); Pompano Beach, Florida, USA
- Military career
- Allegiance: United States
- Branch: Royal Air Force (United Kingdom)
- Rank: Rear Admiral
- Unit: Royal Air Force: No. 210 Squadron RAF
- Conflicts: World War I
- Awards: British Distinguished Flying Cross
- Other work: U. S. Air Mail pilot; returned to duty in USN during World War II

Lieutenant (later rear admiral) Kenneth Russell Unger was an American World War I flying ace credited with fourteen aerial victories. His candidacy rejected by his own nation, Unger applied to the British Royal Flying Corps for military pilot training in June 1917. Once trained, he was assigned to the Royal Naval Air Service (RNAS). As the RNAS was merged into the Royal Air Force, Unger scored his aerial victories between 26 June and 1 November 1918. In later life, Unger remained involved in aviation and served again during World War II. He also joined the U.S. Navy Reserves, rising to the rank of rear admiral.

== Early training ==
Unger took private instruction with the Aero Club of America, earning Certificate No. 1356. Nevertheless, the United States Air Service rejected him for enlistment, so he went to Canada to join the Royal Flying Corps in June 1917. Ironically, his RFC training took him back to Texas. He then transited England on his way to service with No. 10 Squadron RNAS, in France as a Sopwith Camel pilot.

== Aerial victories ==
Unger opened his victory roll by sharing in a quadruple victory with Captain Lawrence Coombes and Lieutenant Ivan Sanderson; the trio shot down the distinctively marked Fokker D.VII of German naval ace Kurt Schönfelder, and drove down a D.VII and two Pfalz D.IIIs out of control on 26 June 1918. His next victory, when he drove down another Fokker D.VII, took place on 20 July. He scored again on 31 July, then took a break. He resumed with a win on 24 September and ran his total to thirteen by 30 October 1918. That was the sortie on which he took on seven enemy Fokkers despite his Sopwith Camel's engine running rough. Two days later, Lieutenant Unger became a balloon buster, destroying an enemy observation balloon. His final tally was seven enemy aircraft destroyed and seven driven down out of control; with the exception of the balloon and one observation plane, his victories were all over enemy fighters, principally Fokker D.VIIs. His reward for his efforts, a Distinguished Flying Cross, was not gazetted until 7 February 1919.

== Post World War I ==
Postwar, Unger became a U. S. Air Mail pilot, flying the Oakland to Salt Lake City route. On 19 September 1927, he was reportedly on the brink on competition in an air derby in Spokane, Washington; after the derby, he was going to fly down the West Coast, across Panama, and up the Atlantic Coast in an amphibian. He also had his own aviation school at the Hadley Airport, where he performed in air shows. During one of his exhibitions in 1932, his airplane broke up but he parachuted to safety.

Despite having 10,000 flying hours behind him, in April 1943 he was back in aviation school. He returned to service as a Lieutenant Commander in the U. S. Navy during February 1943; he flew transport planes. He eventually attained the rank of rear admiral in the Naval Reserve.

He retired to Florida in 1958; he died there on 6 January 1979.

== See also ==
- List of World War I flying aces from the United States

== Bibliography ==
- Above the Trenches: A Complete Record of the Fighter Aces and Units of the British Empire Air Forces 1915-1920 Christopher F. Shores, Norman L. R. Franks, Russell Guest. Grub Street, 1990. ISBN 0-948817-19-4, ISBN 978-0-948817-19-9.
- American Aces of World War I. Norman Franks, Harry Dempsey. Osprey Publishing, 2001. ISBN 1-84176-375-6, ISBN 978-1-84176-375-0.
