= Gabbs Airport =

- IATA: GAB; ICAO: KGAB; FAA LID: GAB

Summary
- Airport type: Public
- Owner: Nye County
- Serves: Gabbs, Nevada
- Elevation AMSL: 4,700 ft (1,400 m)
- Coordinates: 38°55′27″N 117°57′32″W
- Interactive map of Gabbs Airport

Runways
Direction	Length		Surface
Direction	ft	m	Surface
9/27	5,950	1,814	Dirt
16/34	2,650	808	Dirt

Statistics (2023)
- Aircraft operations (year ending 4/10/2023): 646
- Source: Federal Aviation Administration

Gabbs Airport (IATA: GAB, ICAO: KGAB, FAA LID: GAB) is a county-owned public-use airport located four nautical miles (7 km) northwest of the central business district of Gabbs, a city in Nye County, Nevada, United States.

== Facilities and aircraft ==
Gabbs Airport covers an area of 880 acres (360 ha) at an elevation of 4,700 feet (1,433 m) above mean sea level. It has two runways with dirt surfaces: 9/27 measuring 5,950 by 65 feet (1,814 x 20 m) and 16/34 measuring 2,650 by 65 feet (808 x 20 m).

For the 12-month period ending April 10, 2023, the airport had 646 aircraft operations: 58% military and 43% general aviation.

== See also ==
- List of airports in Nevada
