= Dyer Airport =

- IATA: none; ICAO: none; FAA LID: 2Q9

Summary
- Airport type: Public
- Owner: U.S. Bureau of Land Management
- Serves: Dyer, Nevada
- Elevation AMSL: 4,899 ft (1,493 m)
- Coordinates: 37°36′35″N 118°00′23″W

Map
- Location of airport in Nevada 2Q9 (the United States)

Runways
Direction	Length		Surface
Direction	ft	m	Surface
12/30	2,870	875	Dirt

Statistics (2010)
- Aircraft operations: 240
- Based aircraft: 5
- Source: Federal Aviation Administration

Dyer Airport (FAA LID: 2Q9) is a public use airport located six nautical miles (11 km) southeast of Dyer, in Esmeralda County, Nevada, United States. It is owned by the U.S. Bureau of Land Management.

== Facilities and aircraft ==
Dyer Airport covers an area of 156 acres (63 ha) at an elevation of 4,899 feet (1,493 m) above mean sea level. It has one runway designated 12/30 with a dirt surface measuring 2,870 by 50 feet (875 x 15 m).

For the 12-month period ending November 30, 2010, the airport had 240 general aviation aircraft operations, an average of 20 per month. At that time there were five aircraft based at this airport, all single-engine.

== See also ==
- List of airports in Nevada
