= Sandy Valley, Nevada =

- Town and census-designated place
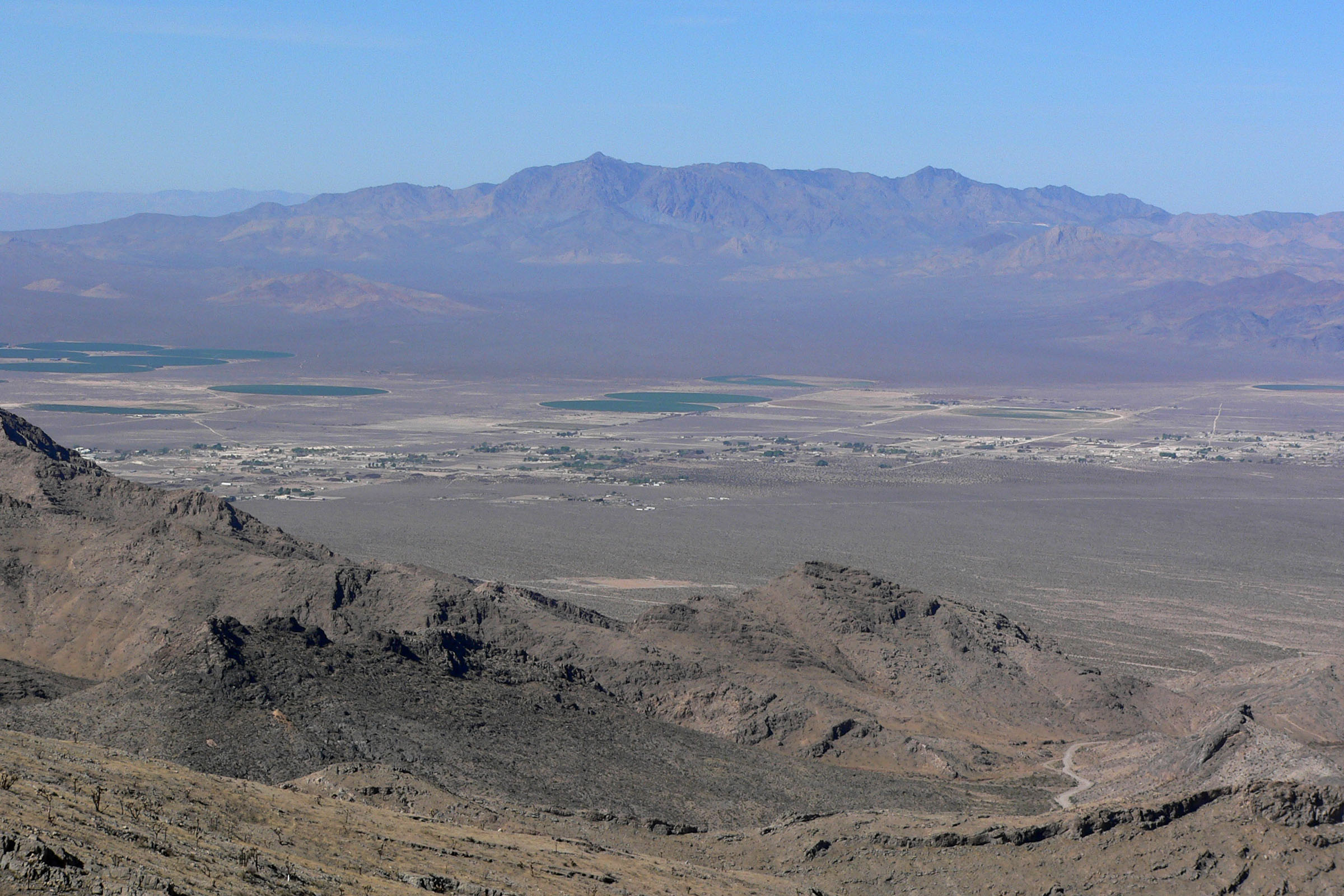

- Location of Sandy Valley in Clark County, Nevada
- Coordinates: 35°49′44″N 115°39′7″W
- Country: United States
- State: Nevada
- County: Clark

Area
  - Total: 56.00 sq mi (145.03 km^{2})
  - Land: 56.00 sq mi (145.03 km^{2})
- Elevation: 2,766 ft (843 m)

Population (2020)
  - Total: 2,663
  - Density: 29.7/sq mi (11.47/km^{2})
- Time zone: UTC-8 (PST)
  - Summer (DST): UTC-7 (PDT)
- ZIP code: 89019
- Area codes: 702 and 725
- FIPS code: 32-64600
- GNIS feature ID: 2409272

Sandy Valley is a bedroom community of Las Vegas located in west–central Clark County, Nevada, United States. It is approximately 35 miles (56 km) from the southern part of Las Vegas and west of Henderson, and 20 miles from the Jean exit at Interstate 15. Sandy Valley is also located 14 miles from the historic town of Goodsprings. As of the 2020 census, Sandy Valley had a population of 1,663.

Sandy Valley is home to Sky Ranch Estates, a custom residential aviation community with private hangars and direct access to the privately owned, public-use Sky Ranch Airport.

== Geography ==
Sandy Valley is located in the Mesquite Valley of the Mojave desert and is bordered by the Spring Mountains' southern extension, Mount Potosi to the East, and the Kingston Mountain range to the west.

Sandy Valley has a total area of 56.0 square miles (145 km^{2}).

== Education ==
Sandy Valley's public school falls under the jurisdiction of the Clark County School District. The Sandy Valley School serves grades Pre-K to 12. The school offers AP Calculus and AP US Government as well as dual enrollment college credit for Linear Algebra 125, Pre-Calculus 126, English 101 and English 102.

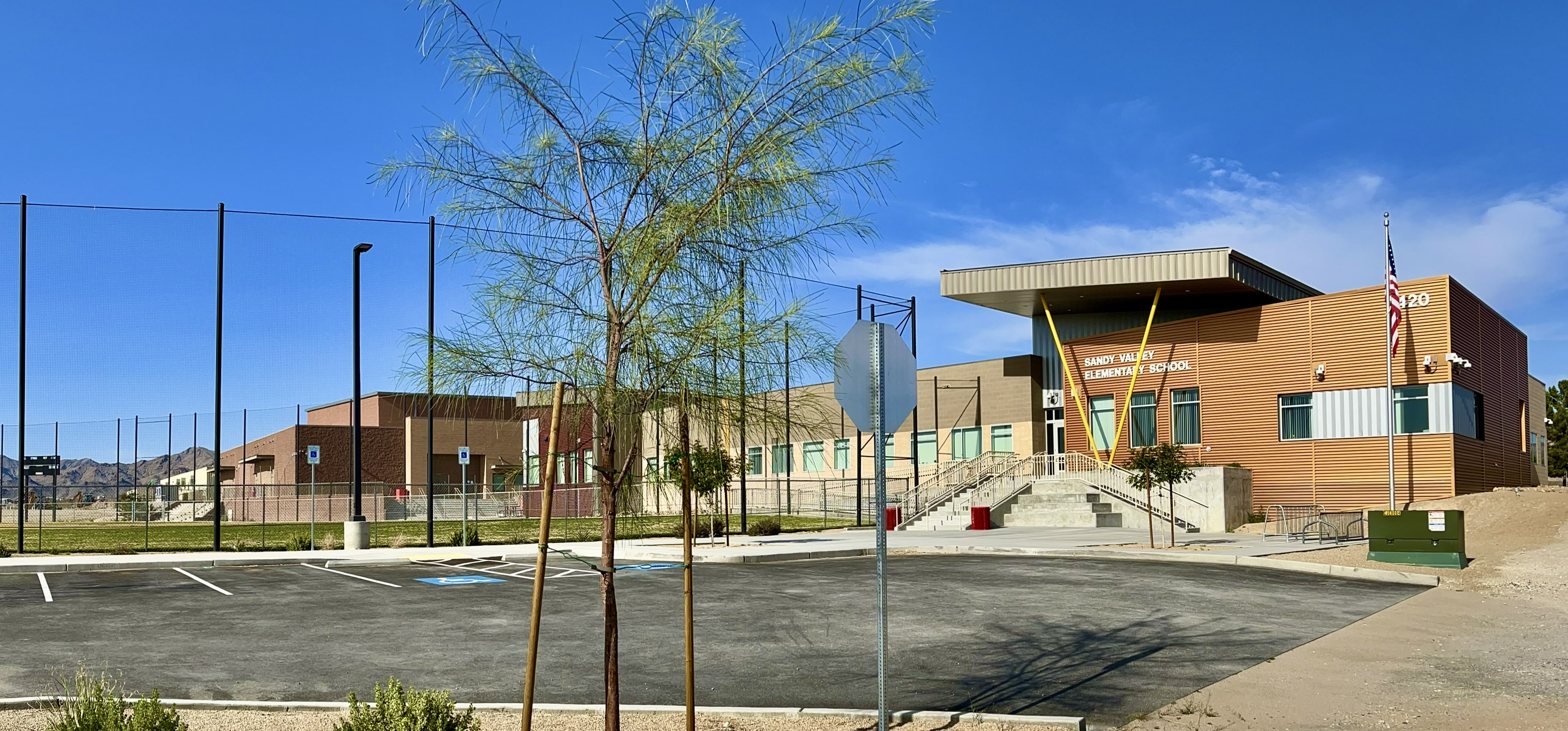
Sandy Valley School PreK-12, Clark County, NV.

The school offers the following sports:

Girls' Softball, Basketball, Volleyball, Cheerleading, Cross Country.

Boys' Baseball, Basketball and Football, Cross Country, Volleyball.

Sandy Valley's school mascot is the Sidewinder.

== Library ==
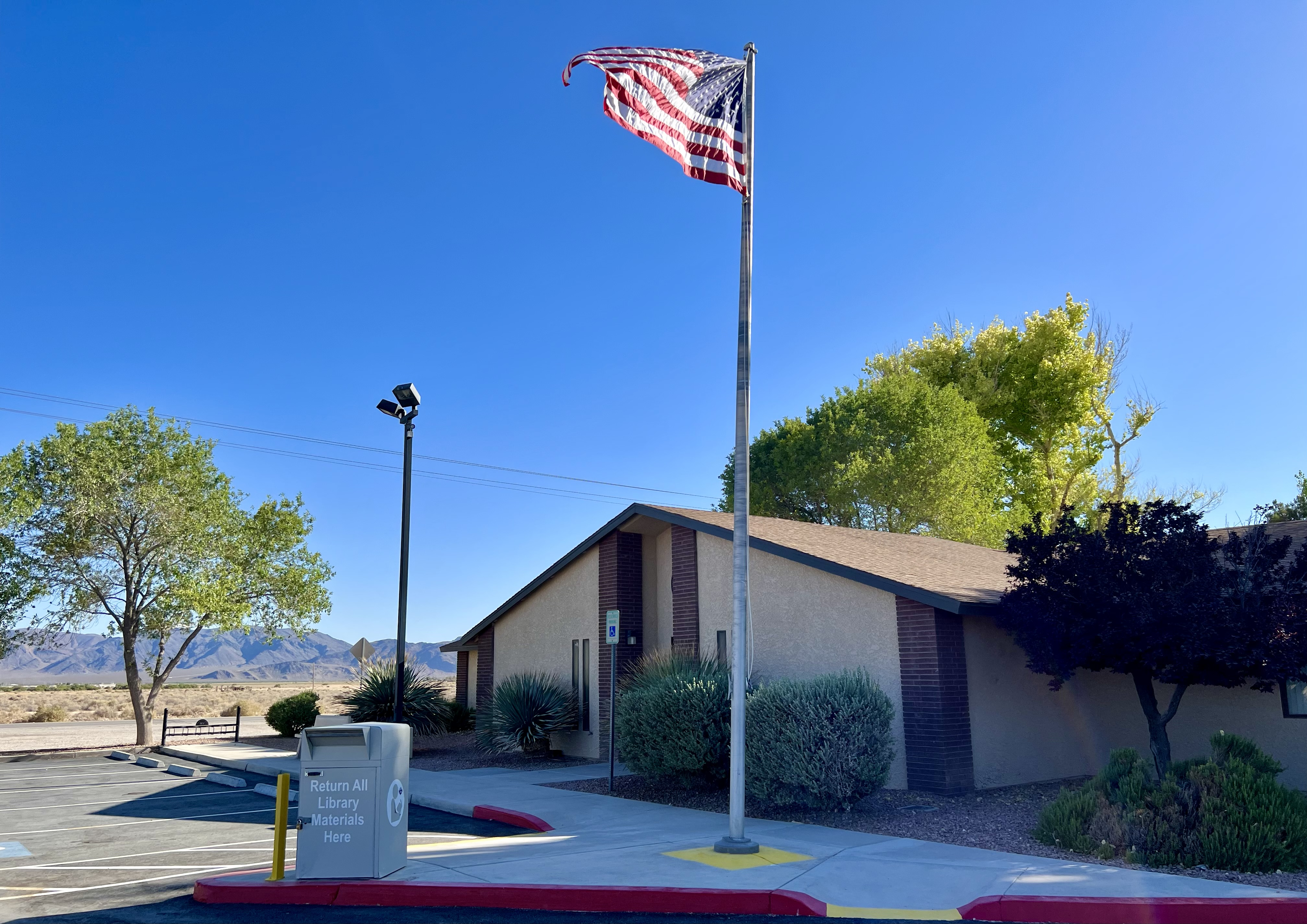
Sandy Valley Library

The Sandy Valley Library is operated by the Las Vegas-Clark County Library District and has access to the entire 3.6 million circulation collection of the LVCCLD libraries.

== Parks and recreation ==
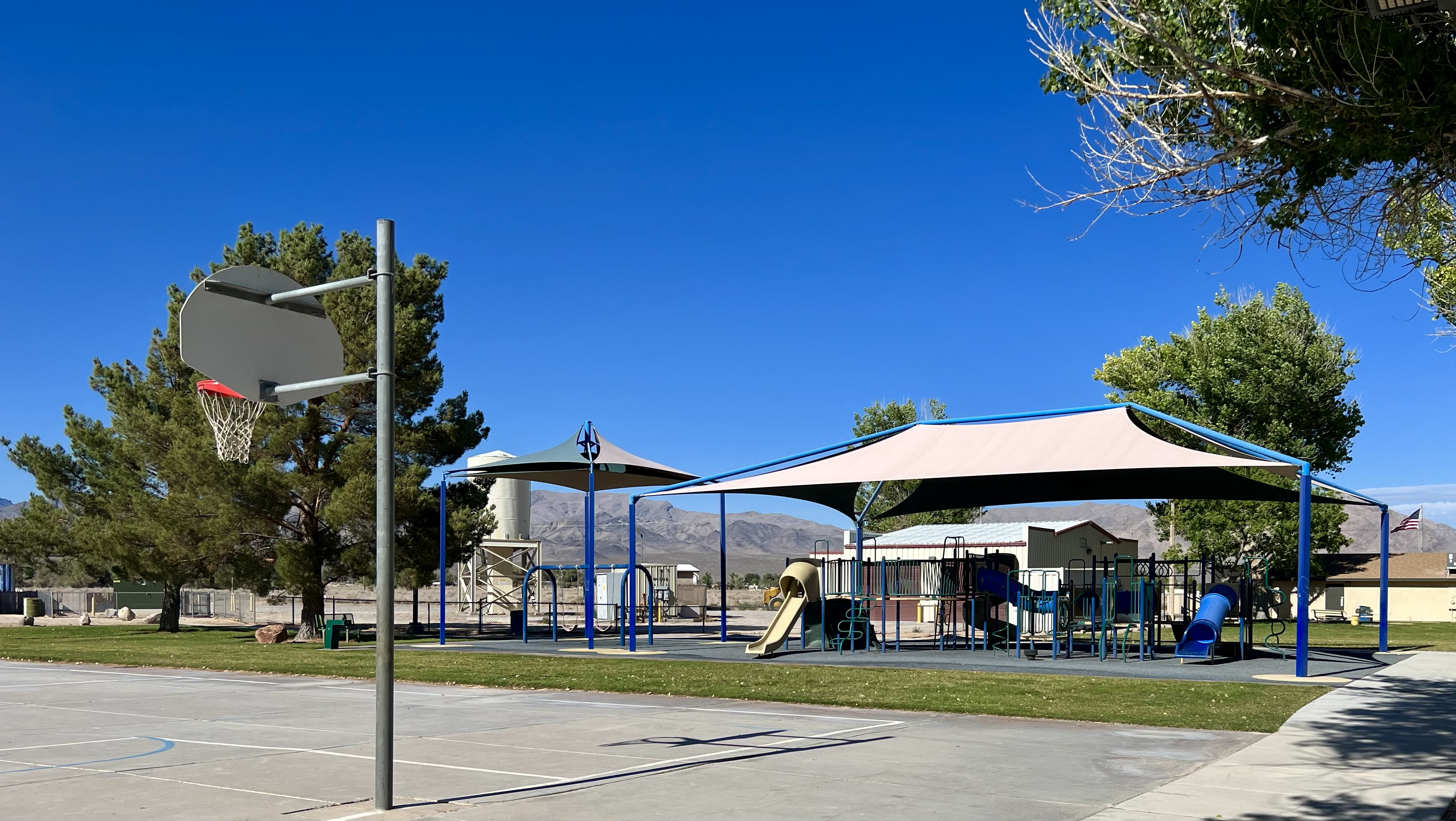
Peace Park

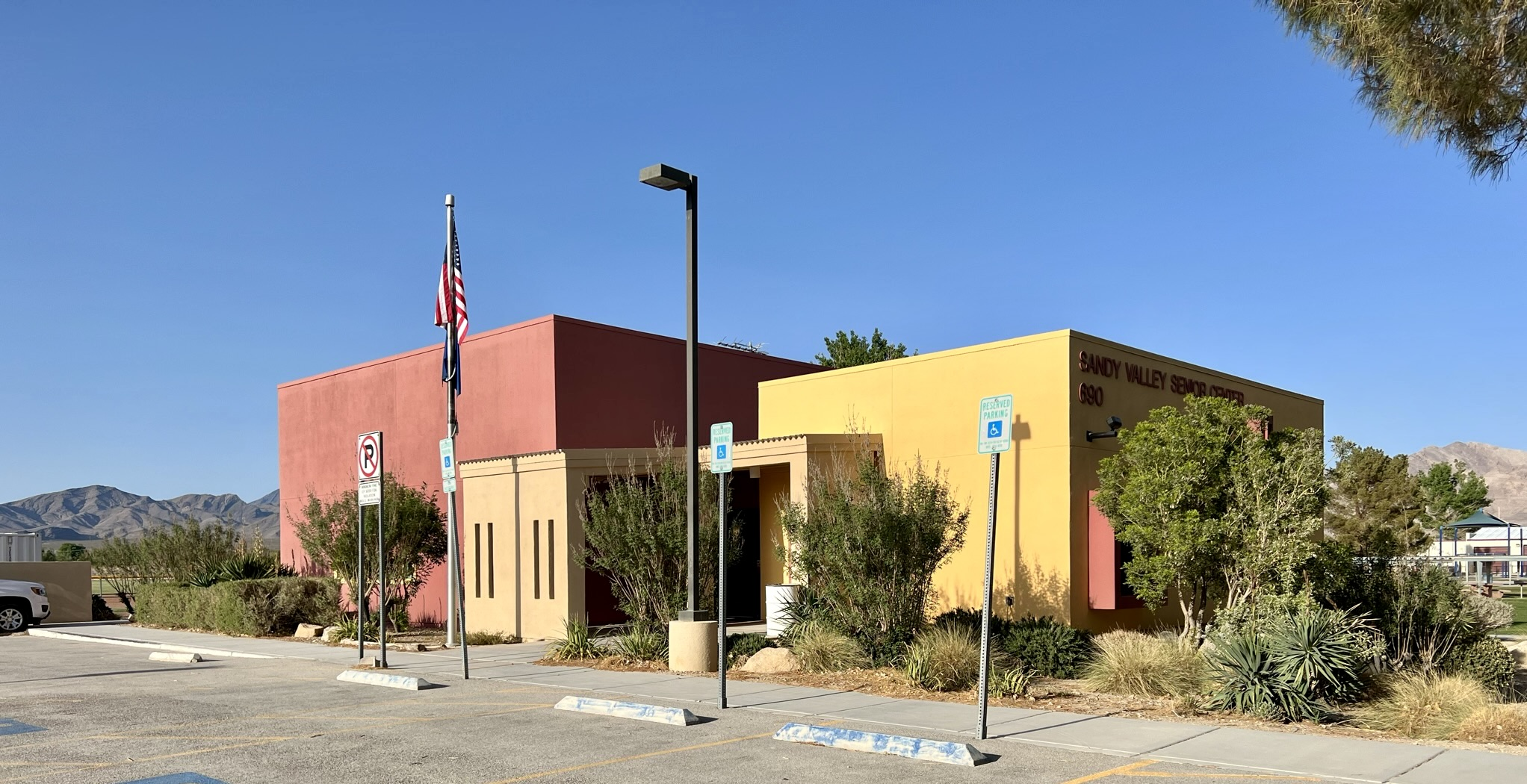
Sandy Valley Senior Center

Sandy Valley has a community center that features a sports field, basketball court, baseball field, kid's splash pad, barbecue area, playground, and barrel racing arena. The Community Center hosts many social gatherings throughout the year such as movie nights, Easter egg hunts, Fourth of July barbecues, and a Christmas light parade and caroling.

The Sandy Valley Senior Center offers social activities and events such as pancake breakfasts, watercolor painting classes, quilting classes, card games, and puzzles.

== Community services ==
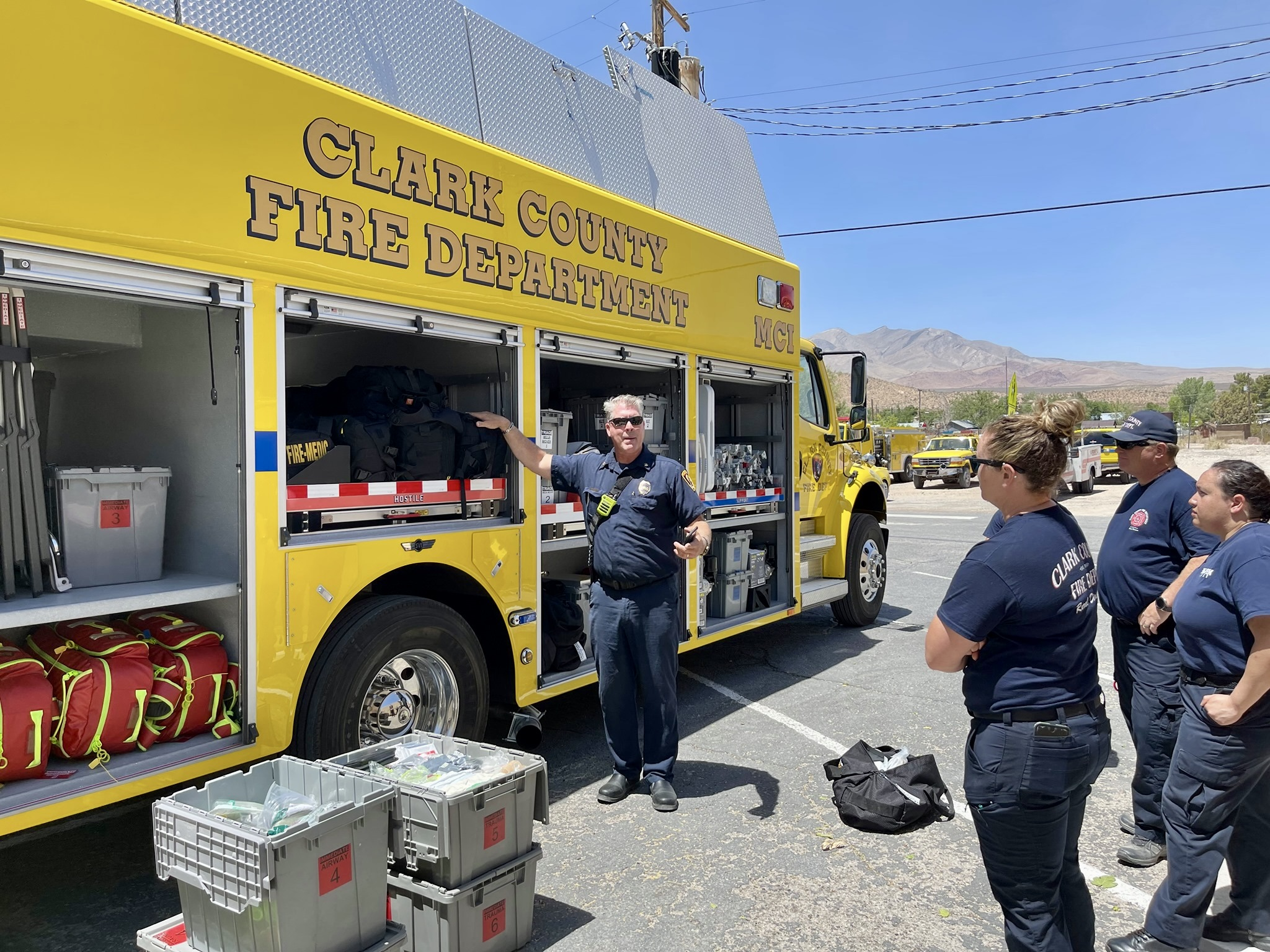
Clark County Fire Department in Sandy Valley

Sandy Valley offers many services and amenities, including a gas station with a general store, USPS post office, and restaurants.

Free pet immunization clinic.

Free mobile Mammovan Clinic.

== In popular culture ==
Country singer Kelsea Ballerini's music video "Peter Pan" (2015) was filmed in Sandy Valley.

The Killers music group filmed their music video "Dirt Sledding" (2015) at the Sandy Valley Ranch.

The 2022 film Liger featuring Mike Tyson had scenes filmed at the Sandy Valley Ranch.

The acrobatic circus show "Ignite" performed under the stars at the Sandy Valley Ranch (2021).

== Demographics ==
According to the 2010 census, there were 2,051 residents and 1,024 households in Sandy Valley. The median household income in Sandy Valley in 2010 was $46,389.

== Notable people ==
- Bo Gritz, former U.S. Army soldier and political activist, lived in Sandy Valley
