= Eglon Township, Clay County, Minnesota =

Township in Minnesota, United States

Eglon Township
- Township
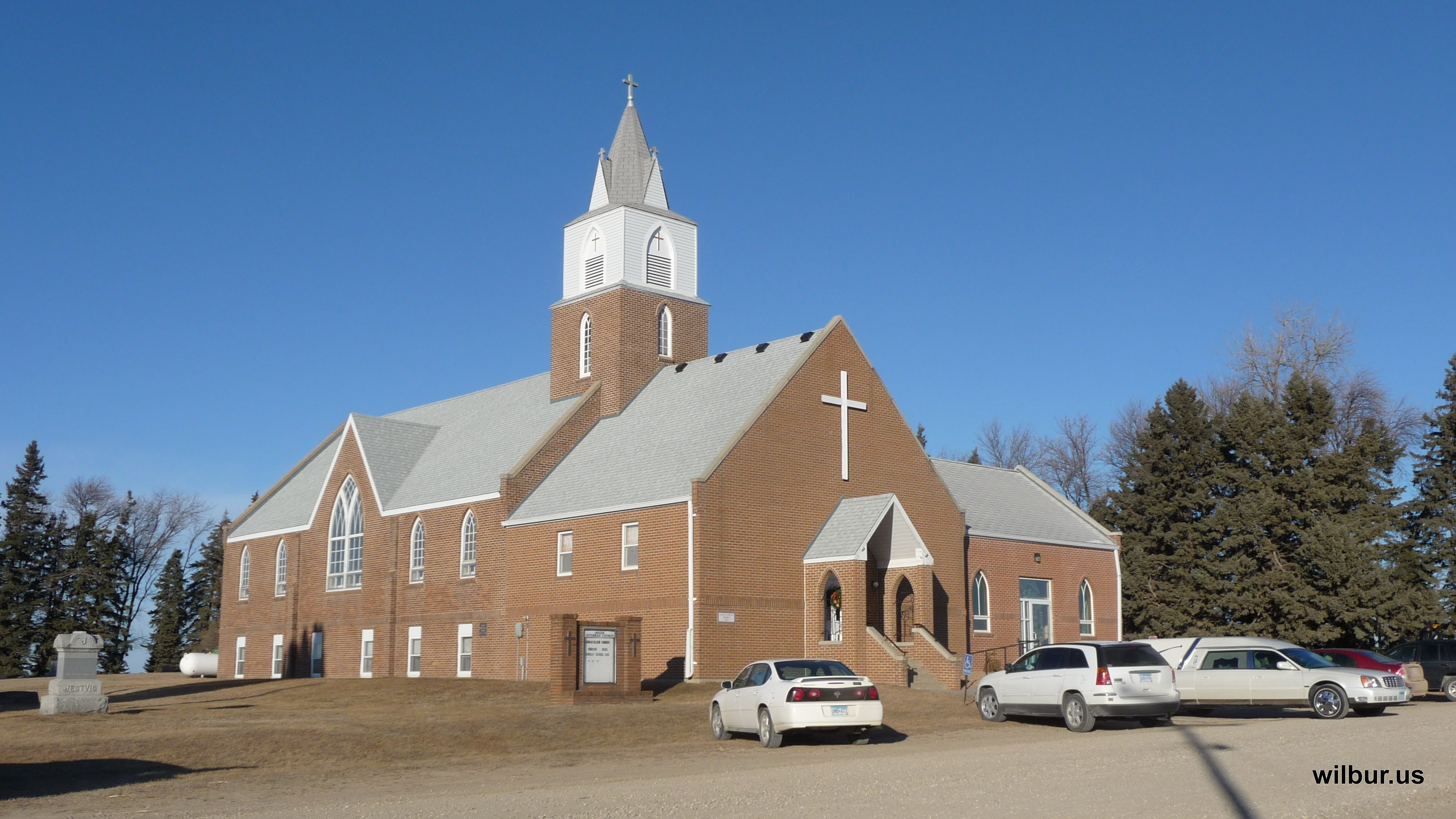
- Solem Church

- Location of Eglon Township, within Clay County, Minnesota

- Location within the state of Minnesota Eglon Township (the United States)
- Coordinates: 46°51′26″N 96°14′14″W
- Country: United States
- State: Minnesota
- County: Clay

Area
  - Total: 35.9 sq mi (93.1 km^{2})
  - Land: 34.0 sq mi (88.1 km^{2})
  - Water: 1.9 sq mi (5.0 km^{2})
- Elevation: 1,335 ft (407 m)

Population (2020)
  - Total: 708
  - Density: 20.8/sq mi (8.04/km^{2})
- Time zone: UTC-6 (Central (CST))
  - Summer (DST): UTC-5 (CDT)
- FIPS code: 27-18314
- GNIS feature ID: 0664055

Eglon Township is a township in Clay County, Minnesota, United States. The population was 708 at the 2020 census.

Eglon Township was named directly or indirectly after Eglon in ancient Palestine.

== Geography ==
According to the United States Census Bureau, the township has a total area of 36.0 square miles (93 km^{2}), of which 34.0 square miles (88 km^{2}) is land and 1.9 square miles (4.9 km^{2}) (5.39%) is water.

== Demographics ==
As of the census of 2000, there were 440 people, 152 households, and 136 families residing in the township. The population density was 12.9 inhabitants per square mile (5.0/km^{2}). There were 159 housing units at an average density of 4.7 per square mile (1.8/km^{2}). The racial makeup of the township was 98.18% White, 0.45% Native American, 0.23% Asian, 0.91% from other races, and 0.23% from two or more races. Hispanic or Latino of any race were 1.14% of the population.

There were 152 households, out of which 41.4% had children under 18 living with them, 80.3% were married couples living together, 3.3% had a female householder with no husband present, and 9.9% were non-families. 8.6% of all households were made up of individuals, and 2.0% had someone living alone who was 65 years of age or older. The average household size was 2.89, and the average family size was 3.04.

In the township, the population was spread out, with 30.2% under 18, 3.9% from 18 to 24, 24.3% from 25 to 44, 29.8% from 45 to 64, and 11.8% who were 65 years of age or older. The median age was 40 years. For every 100 females, there were 118.9 males. For every 100 females age 18 and over, there were 119.3 males.

The median income for a household in the township was $49,318, and the median income for a family was $50,781. Males had a median income of $33,250 versus $18,750 for females. The per capita income for the township was $17,356. None of the families and 0.4% of the population were living below the poverty line, including no under eighteens and none of those over 64.
