= Upper Cormorant Lake =

Lake in the state of Minnesota, United States

- Location within Minnesota
- Location: Becker County, Minnesota
- Group: Cormorant Lakes
- Coordinates: 46°46′25″N 96°07′58″W
- Basin countries: United States
- Surface area: 926 acres (375 ha)
- Max. depth: 29 feet (8.8 m)
- Shore length^{1}: 11.8 miles (19.0 km)
- ^{1} Shore length is not a well-defined measure.

Upper Cormorant Lake is a ground water-seepage freshwater lake with no inflow or outflow that is located south of the Audubon Township in Becker County. The lake has a surface area of 926 to 1,067 acres (375 to 432 ha) with a maximum depth of about 29 feet (8.8 m). The lake is part of the Cormorant Lakes group.
