= Mercury, Nevada =

Unincorporated community in Nevada, US

Mercury
- Village
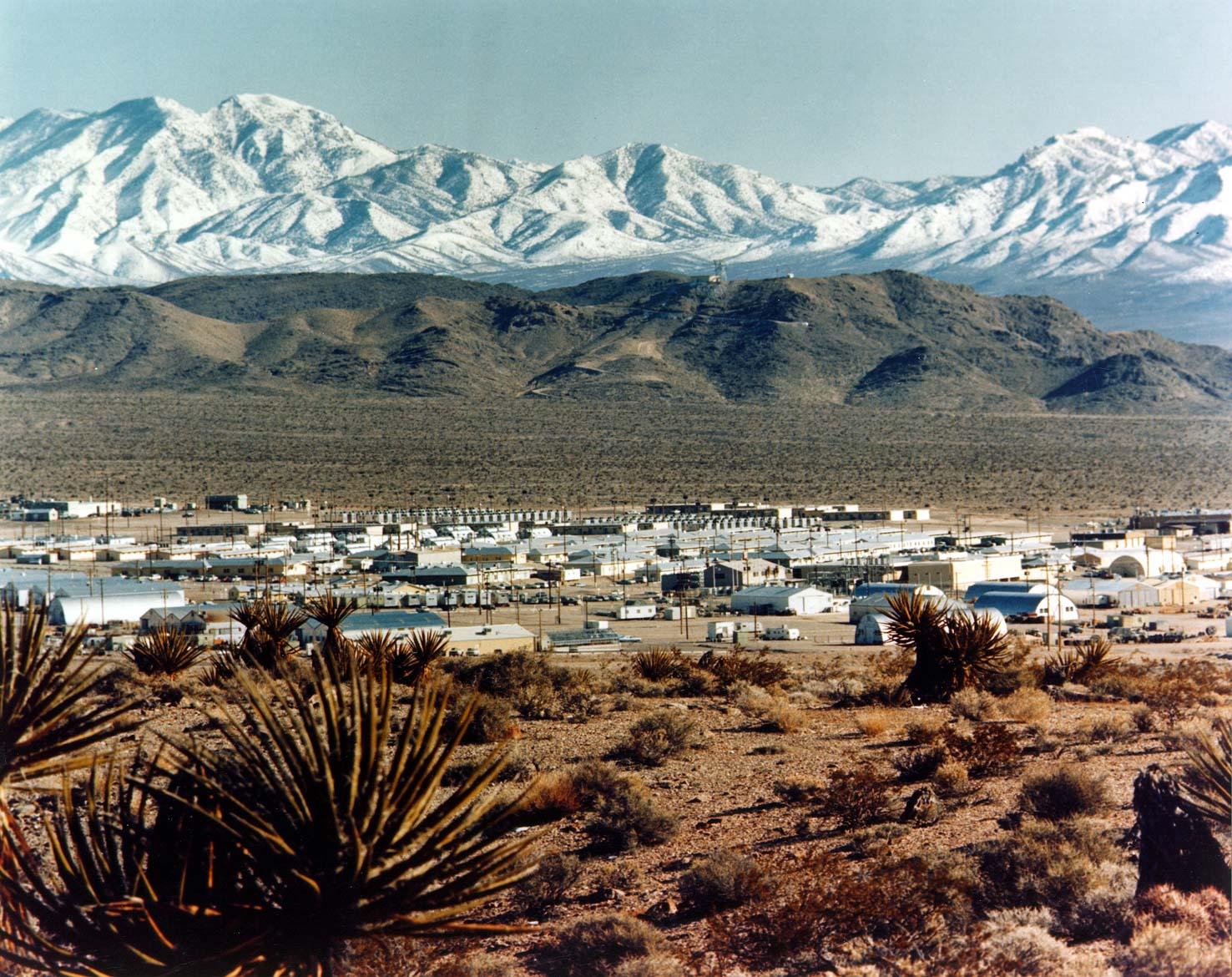
- Photo courtesy of the National Nuclear Security Administration Nevada Site Office

- Location within the state of Nevada
- Coordinates: 36°39′36″N 115°59′35″W
- Country: United States
- State: Nevada
- County: Nye
- Founded: 1950; 76 years ago
- Named for: Mercury
- Elevation: 3,789 ft (1,155 m)
- Time zone: UTC-8 (PST)
  - Summer (DST): UTC-7 (PDT)
- ZIP codes: 89023
- GNIS feature ID: 845560

Mercury is a closed village in Nye County, Nevada, United States, 5 miles (8.0 km) north of U.S. Route 95 at a point 65 miles (105 km) northwest of Las Vegas. It is situated within the Nevada National Security Site and was constructed by the Atomic Energy Commission to house and service the staff of the test site. The specific site was known as Jackass Flats and nearby Nevada Test Site 400. The site is governed by the United States Department of Energy. As part of the test site, the village is not accessible to the general public. It was named after the mercury mines which flourished in its general vicinity a century before the village itself was established. Its population is unknown.

== History ==
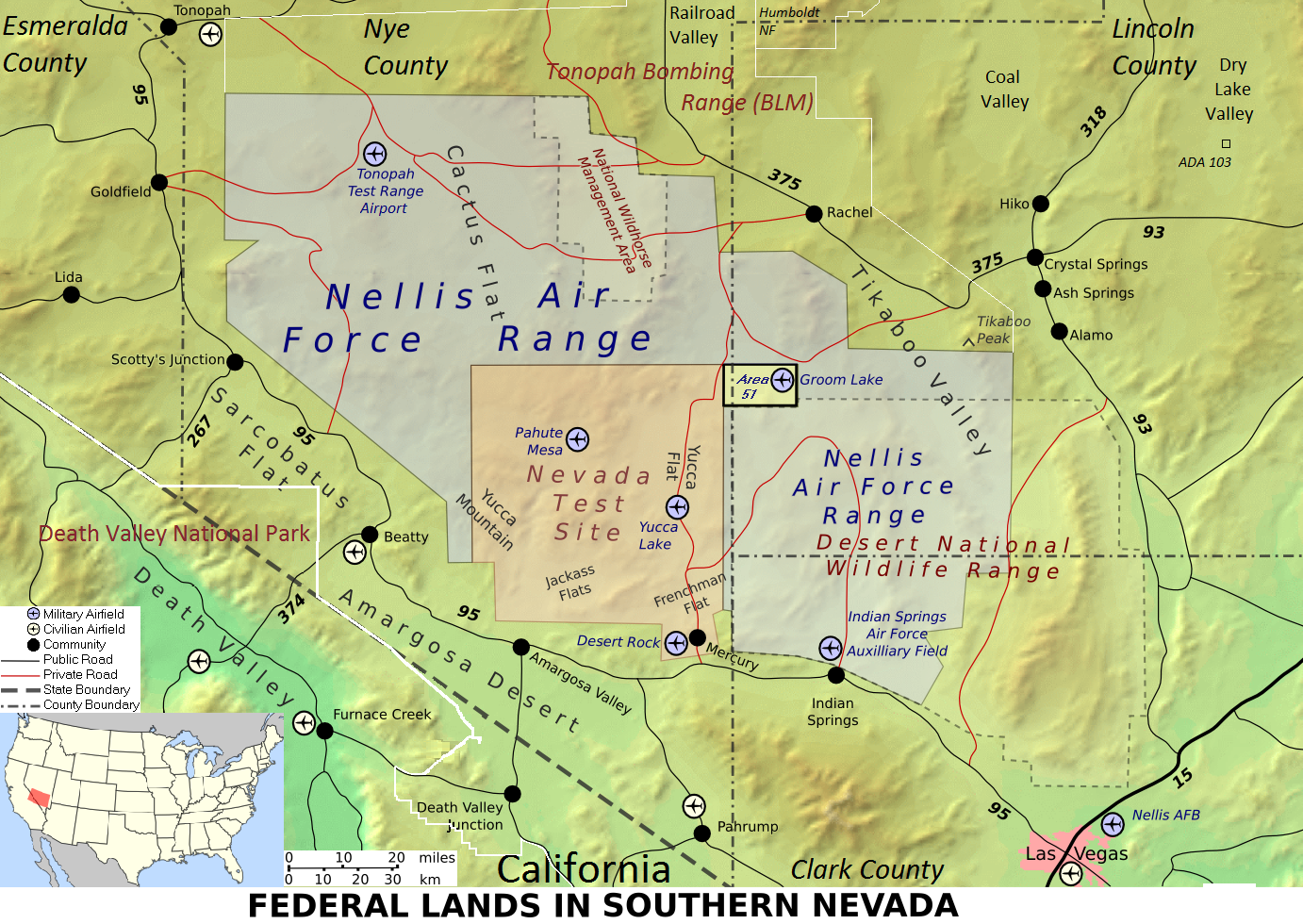
Map showing Mercury and nearby Desert Rock airfield

The village started in 1950 at the beginning of operations of the Nevada Test Site as Base Camp Mercury, a military-style encampment built to provide basic facilities for personnel involved. As the scope of the testing program expanded, so did the number of personnel required to fulfill the site's mission, and beginning in 1951 a $6.7 million construction project was undertaken to provide adequate individual housing, office, and service structures with a civilian village-like design. With the acquisition of a full-service post office in the mid-1950s, Base Camp Mercury was formally renamed Mercury, Nevada.

In 1957, the US Navy launched nine atmospheric sounding rockets to measure nuclear radiation and other atmospheric data, using Mercury as a staging area. The Naval Radiological Defense Laboratory conducted its first test flight in 1956. This test rocket lifted 13.6 kilograms (30 lb) to an altitude of 40 kilometers (25 mi).

In the early 1960s the village population grew to over 10,000, and further construction work was undertaken to upgrade the permanence of the village. A school was established, and numerous recreational and shopping facilities were added, including a movie theater, bowling alley, recreation hall, swimming pool, and hobby center, as well as a full-care health clinic, library, lodging (the Atomic Motel being the most prominent example), a non-denominational chapel with a cadre of chaplains, a service station with a garage, and a bus station. In 1962, the Desert Rock Airport was added for the visit from President John F. Kennedy on December 8.

The village flourished until 1992, when all but subcritical nuclear testing ended at the Nevada Test Site, as a result of the United States honoring the Comprehensive Nuclear-Test-Ban Treaty (even though the U.S. has not yet ratified the treaty). The population shrank rapidly thereafter, leaving most of the facilities abandoned. A skeleton crew of scientists and military remains in Mercury, conducting limited testing and research. Most of the amenities have closed, and the village has become a shell of its former self, although dining, bar facilities, and a gym remain. The population is unknown and fluctuates. The last known census recorded about 500 people.

== Geography ==
=== Climate ===
According to the Köppen Climate Classification system, Mercury has a cold desert climate, abbreviated "BWk" on climate maps. The hottest temperature recorded in Mercury was 114 °F (46 °C) on July 11, 2021, while the coldest temperature recorded was 6 °F (−14 °C) on December 22, 1990.

Climate data for Mercury, Nevada (Desert Rock Airport), 1991–2020 normals, extremes 1978–present
Month	Jan	Feb	Mar	Apr	May	Jun	Jul	Aug	Sep	Oct	Nov	Dec	Year
Record high °F (°C)	77 (25)	83 (28)	87 (31)	96 (36)	106 (41)	113 (45)	114 (46)	112 (44)	110 (43)	103 (39)	85 (29)	74 (23)	114 (46)
Mean maximum °F (°C)	68.0 (20.0)	71.5 (21.9)	80.0 (26.7)	88.7 (31.5)	96.9 (36.1)	105.3 (40.7)	108.9 (42.7)	106.1 (41.2)	100.8 (38.2)	90.7 (32.6)	77.8 (25.4)	67.3 (19.6)	109.8 (43.2)
Mean daily maximum °F (°C)	56.6 (13.7)	59.9 (15.5)	67.4 (19.7)	74.2 (23.4)	83.8 (28.8)	94.7 (34.8)	100.7 (38.2)	98.8 (37.1)	91.1 (32.8)	78.1 (25.6)	64.6 (18.1)	55.0 (12.8)	77.1 (25.0)
Daily mean °F (°C)	45.0 (7.2)	47.9 (8.8)	54.1 (12.3)	60.3 (15.7)	69.5 (20.8)	79.6 (26.4)	86.0 (30.0)	84.3 (29.1)	76.3 (24.6)	64.0 (17.8)	51.6 (10.9)	43.6 (6.4)	63.5 (17.5)
Mean daily minimum °F (°C)	33.4 (0.8)	35.8 (2.1)	40.9 (4.9)	46.5 (8.1)	55.2 (12.9)	64.4 (18.0)	71.3 (21.8)	69.7 (20.9)	61.5 (16.4)	49.9 (9.9)	38.5 (3.6)	32.2 (0.1)	49.9 (10.0)
Mean minimum °F (°C)	23.0 (−5.0)	26.0 (−3.3)	30.0 (−1.1)	35.1 (1.7)	42.7 (5.9)	52.3 (11.3)	62.4 (16.9)	60.1 (15.6)	50.6 (10.3)	38.4 (3.6)	26.8 (−2.9)	22.3 (−5.4)	20.0 (−6.7)
Record low °F (°C)	13 (−11)	11 (−12)	23 (−5)	23 (−5)	33 (1)	40 (4)	51 (11)	52 (11)	39 (4)	28 (−2)	19 (−7)	6 (−14)	6 (−14)
Average precipitation inches (mm)	0.68 (17)	0.94 (24)	0.58 (15)	0.36 (9.1)	0.18 (4.6)	0.12 (3.0)	0.32 (8.1)	0.39 (9.9)	0.38 (9.7)	0.37 (9.4)	0.27 (6.9)	0.63 (16)	5.22 (132.7)
Average snowfall inches (cm)	0.3 (0.76)	0.2 (0.51)	0.2 (0.51)	0.1 (0.25)	0.0 (0.0)	0.0 (0.0)	0.0 (0.0)	0.0 (0.0)	0.0 (0.0)	0.0 (0.0)	0.0 (0.0)	0.2 (0.51)	1.0 (2.5)
Average precipitation days (≥ 0.01 in)	4.2	4.5	3.6	2.6	2.1	0.9	2.1	1.6	1.7	2.1	2.2	3.2	30.8
Average snowy days (≥ 0.1 in)	0.3	0.3	0.3	0.1	0.0	0.0	0.0	0.0	0.0	0.0	0.0	0.3	1.3
Source 1: NOAA
Source 2: National Weather Service
