= Wells Municipal Airport (Nevada) =

Wells Municipal Airport Harriet Field
- IATA: LWL; ICAO: KLWL; FAA LID: LWL

Summary
- Airport type: Public
- Owner: City of Wells
- Serves: Wells, Nevada
- Elevation AMSL: 5,769 ft / 1,758 m
- Coordinates: 41°07′02″N 114°55′20″W

Map
- Location in Nevada LWL (the United States)

Runways
Direction	Length		Surface
Direction	ft	m	Surface
8/26	5,508	1,679	Asphalt
1/19	2,681	817	Gravel/dirt

Statistics (2011)
- Aircraft operations: 5,502
- Based aircraft: 10
- Source: Federal Aviation Administration

Wells Municipal Airport (IATA: LWL, ICAO: KLWL, FAA LID: LWL) (Harriet Field) is two miles northeast of Wells, in Elko County, Nevada. The National Plan of Integrated Airport Systems for 2011–2015 categorized it as a general aviation facility.

== Facilities ==
The airport covers 708 acres (287 ha) at an elevation of 5,769 feet (1,758 m). It has two runways: 8/26 is 5,508 by 75 feet (1,679 x 23 m) asphalt and 1/19 is 2,681 by 140 feet (817 x 43 m) gravel/dirt.

In the year ending September 30, 2011 the airport had 5,502 aircraft operations, average 15 per day: 99.9% general aviation and <1% military. Ten aircraft were then based here: eight single-engine and two ultralight.

== See also ==
- List of airports in Nevada
