= Lake Lida =

Lake in the state of Minnesota, United States

- Location within Minnesota Location within the United States
- Location: Otter Tail County, Minnesota
- Coordinates: 46.58°N 95.96°W
- Basin countries: United States
- Max. length: 6 mi (9.7 km)
- Max. width: 4 mi (6.4 km)
- Surface area: 5,523 acres (22.4 km^{2})
- Max. depth: 58 ft (18 m)

Lake Lida is a sandy lake located in Otter Tail County, Minnesota, United States. Lida Township is named after the lake and is centered directly over it. The lake is approximately 6 miles (9.7 km) long from north to south, and is a maximum of four miles (6 km) wide from east to west from the widest point. "South Lake Lida" is located directly south of the main lake, separated only by a land bridge. Almost adjacent to the north of Lake Lida are comparatively sized Lake Lizzie and smaller Lake Crystal.

== Dimensions ==
Lake Lida reaches a maximum depth of 58 feet (18 m) in the northern part of the lake and covers an area of 5,523 acres (22.4 km^{2}).
