= Hadley Airport =

- IATA: none; ICAO: none; FAA LID: NV83

Summary
- Airport type: Public
- Owner: U.S. Bureau of Land Management
- Location: Round Mountain, Nevada
- Elevation AMSL: 5,744 ft (1,751 m)
- Coordinates: 38°41′39″N 117°08′48″W
- Interactive map of Hadley Airport

Runways
| Direction | Length | | Surface |
| Direction | ft | m | Surface |
|---|---|---|---|
| 17/35 | 6,776 | 2,065 | Asphalt |

Statistics (2005)
- Aircraft operations: 2,000
- Source: Federal Aviation Administration

Hadley Airport (FAA LID: NV83) is a public use airport owned by the U.S. Bureau of Land Management and located four nautical miles (7 km) southwest of the central business district of Round Mountain, a town in Nye County, Nevada, United States.

== History ==
In the 1930s, American World War I flying ace Kenneth R. Unger ran a flying school and air shows from the airport.

== Facilities and aircraft ==
Hadley Airport covers an area of 35 acres (14 ha). It contains one runway designated 17/35 which has an asphalt surface measuring 6,776 x 60 feet (2,065 x 18 m). For the 12-month period ending June 30, 2005, the airport had 2,000 general aviation aircraft operations, an average of 166 per month.

== See also ==
- List of airports in Nevada
