= Battle of Lida =

Battle of Lida can refer to several conflicts around the city of Lida during the Polish–Soviet War of 1919–20:

- Battle of Lida (1919) in April
- Battle of Lida (1920) in July and September - see Polish–Soviet War in 1920
