= South Twin River Basin =

Coordinates: 38.86°N 117.27°W

The South Twin River Basin is 52 km^{2} (20 sq mi) in the Toiyabe National Forest east of the Toiyabe Range and includes the drainage of the South Fork South Twin River. The river enters the Big Smoky Valley at 1,951 m (6,401 ft) elevation and is completely diverted except during periods of high flow. The adjacent North Twin River Basin is smaller, and the North Twin also flows across Nevada State Route 376 to the same irrigation area, and both drainage basins are part of the Northern Big Smoky Watershed.
