= Tiger Field =

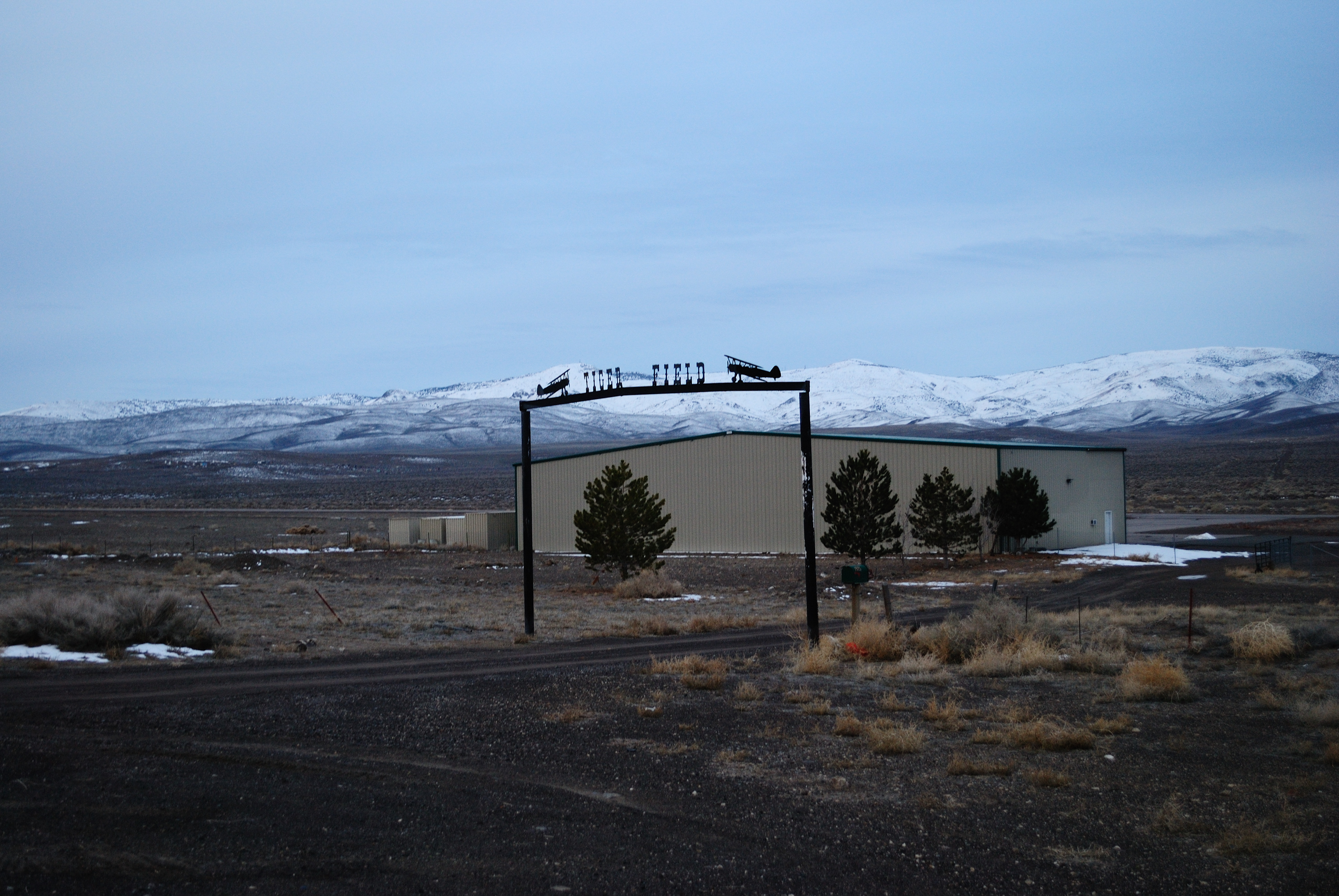
- Entrance to Tiger Field
- IATA: none; ICAO: none; FAA LID: N58

Summary
- Airport type: Public
- Operator: Bureau of Land Management
- Serves: Fernley, Nevada
- Elevation AMSL: 4,346 ft / 1,325 m
- Coordinates: 39°33′35″N 119°14′29″W
- Interactive map of Tiger Field

Runways
Direction	Length		Surface
Direction	ft	m	Surface
15/33	3,974	1,211	Asphalt
5/23	2,750	838	Gravel

Statistics (2009)
- Aircraft operations: 2,400
- Based aircraft: 6
- Source: Federal Aviation Administration

Tiger Field (FAA LID: N58) is a public use airport owned by the U.S. Bureau of Land Management and located three nautical miles (6 km) south of the central business district of Fernley, a city in Lyon County, Nevada, United States.

== History ==
The airport hosted the Fernley Fly-In 2001.

== Facilities and aircraft ==
Tiger Field covers an area of 80 acres (32 ha) at an elevation of 4,346 feet (1,325 m) above mean sea level. It has two runways: 15/33 is 3,974 by 40 feet (1,211 x 12 m) with an asphalt surface; 5/23 is 2,750 by 40 feet (838 x 12 m) with a gravel surface.

For the 12-month period ending June 30, 2009, the airport had 2,400 general aviation aircraft operations, an average of 200 per month. At that time there were 6 aircraft based at this airport: 100% single-engine.

== See also ==
- List of airports in Nevada
