= Desert Rock Airport =

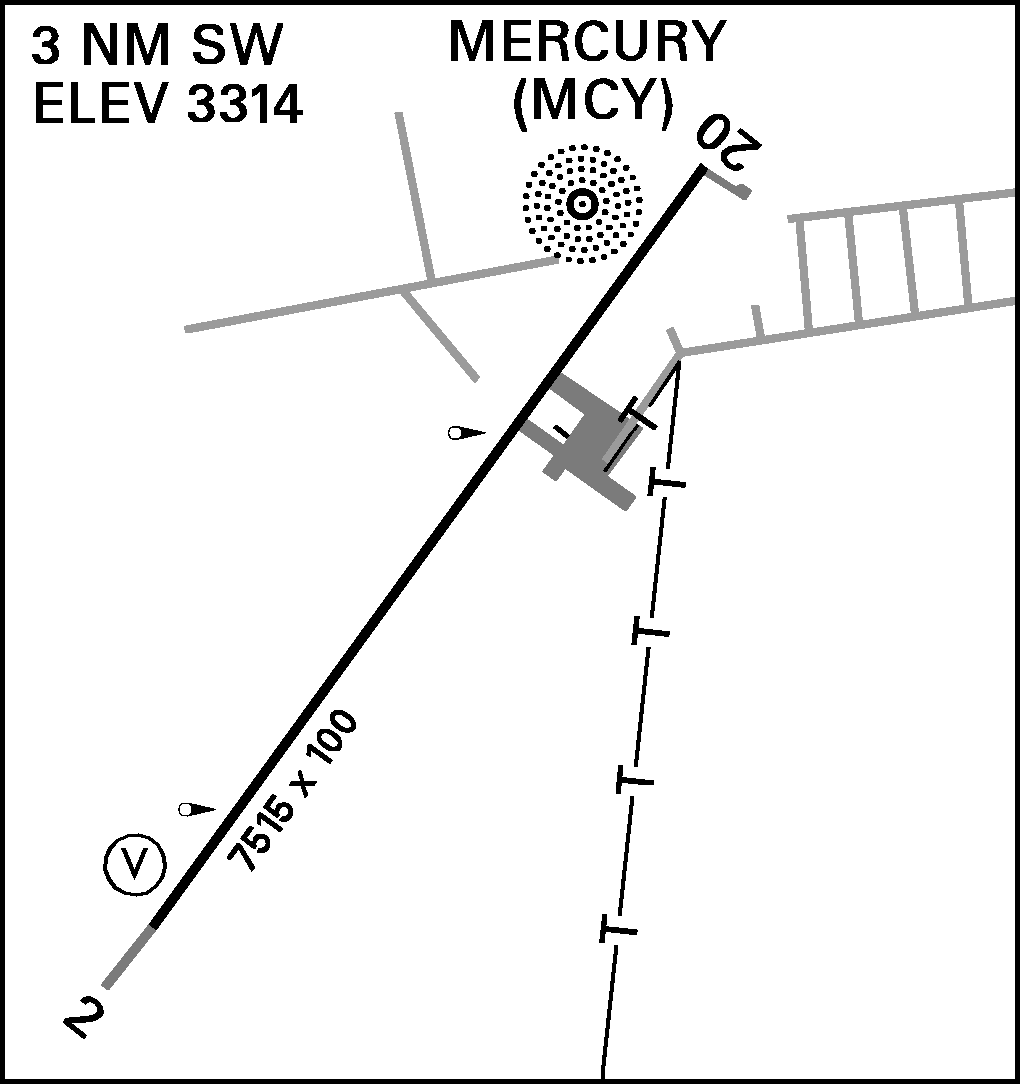
- IATA: DRA; ICAO: none; FAA LID: NV65

Summary
- Airport type: Private
- Owner: United States Department of Energy
- Location: Mercury, Nevada
- Elevation AMSL: 3,314 ft (1,010 m)
- Coordinates: 36°37′10″N 116°01′58″W
- Interactive map of Desert Rock Airport

Runways
Direction	Length		Surface
Direction	ft	m	Surface
2/20	7,515	2,291	Asphalt

Desert Rock Airport is a private-use airport located three miles (5 km) southwest of the central business district of Mercury, in Nye County, Nevada, United States. The airport is located on the Nevada Test Site and is owned by the United States Department of Energy.

== History ==
The airfield is located on the site of the former Camp Desert Rock, a US Army facility.

== Facilities ==
Desert Rock Airport covers 100 acres (40 ha) and has one runway:

- Runway 2/20: 7515 x 100 ft (2291 x 30 m), surface: asphalt
