= East Twin River (Washington) =

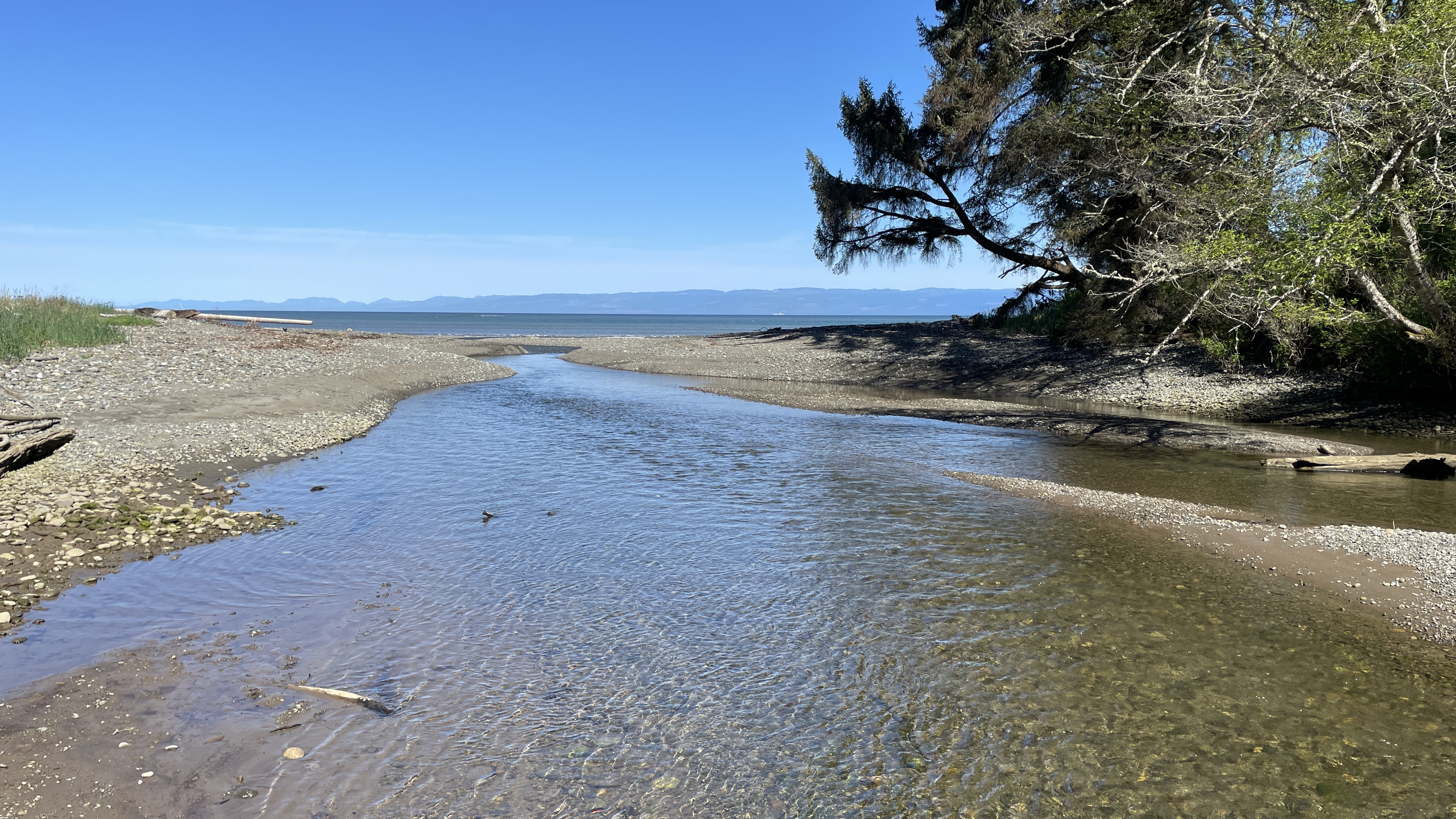

- Location of the mouth of the East Twin River in Washington

Location
- Country: United States
- State: Washington
- County: Clallam

Physical characteristics
- Source: Olympic Mountains
  - coordinates: 48°5′23″N 123°58′35″W
- Mouth: Strait of Juan de Fuca
  - coordinates: 48°9′58″N 123°56′51″W

The East Twin River is a stream on the Olympic Peninsula in the U.S. state of Washington. It originates in the northern Olympic Mountains and flows north, emptying into the Strait of Juan de Fuca just east of West Twin River.

== Course ==
The East Twin River originates in the Olympic National Forest on the north slope of Mount Muller, on the northern portion of Olympic Peninsula. It flows north and slightly east, entering the Strait of Juan de Fuca near the town of Twin, less than 0.5 miles (0.80 km) east of the mouth of the West Twin River.

== See also ==
- List of rivers of Washington (state)
