= Little Cormorant Lake =

Lake in the state of Minnesota, United States

- Location within Minnesota
- Location: Becker County, Minnesota
- Group: Cormorant Lakes
- Coordinates: 46°47′48″N 96°00′17″W
- Basin countries: United States
- Surface area: 924 to 1,067 acres (374 to 432 ha)
- Max. depth: 34 to 35 ft (10 to 11 m)
- Islands: many

Little Cormorant Lake is a ground water-seepage freshwater lake with no inflow or outflow that is located south of the Audubon Township in Becker County. The lake has a surface area of 924 to 1,067 acres (374 to 432 ha) with a maximum depth of about 34 to 35 ft (10 to 11 m) and an average depth of about 17 ft (5.2 m) and has many bays and small islands. The lake contains many fish species including Walleye, Yellow Bullhead, Largemouth Bass, Northern Pike, Rock Bass, Yellow Perch, Black Bullhead, Bluegill and Brown Bullhead. Little Cormorant Lake is part of the Cormorant Lakes group.
