= Spanish Springs Airport =

- IATA: none; ICAO: none; FAA LID: N86

Summary
- Airport type: Public
- Owner: Bureau of Land Management
- Operator: Spanish Springs Pilots Association
- Serves: Reno, Nevada
- Elevation AMSL: 4,600 ft / 1,402 m
- Coordinates: 39°39′59″N 119°43′24″W

Map
- Location of airport in Nevada N86 (the United States)

Runways
Direction	Length		Surface
Direction	ft	m	Surface
16/34	3,540	1,079	Dirt

Statistics (2010)
- Aircraft operations: 4,650
- Based aircraft: 13
- Source: Federal Aviation Administration

Spanish Springs Airport (FAA LID: N86) was a public use airport located 7 nautical miles (8.1 mi; 13 km) north of the central business district of Reno, in Washoe County, Nevada, United States. It is owned by the U.S. Bureau of Land Management and operated by the Spanish Springs Pilots Association, Inc. under BLM Public Airport Lease N-59805.

== Facilities and aircraft ==
Spanish Springs Airport covers an area of 35 acres (14 ha) at an elevation of 4,600 feet (1,400 m) above mean sea level. It has one runway designated 16/34 with a dirt surface measuring 3,540 by 71 feet (1,079 by 22 m).

For the 12-month period ending November 30, 2010, the airport had 4,650 aircraft operations, an average of 12 per day: 99% general aviation and 1% military. At that time there were 13 aircraft based at this airport, all single-engine.

== See also ==
- List of airports in Nevada
