= Pelican River (Otter Tail River tributary) =

Coordinates: 46.2868°N 96.1347°W

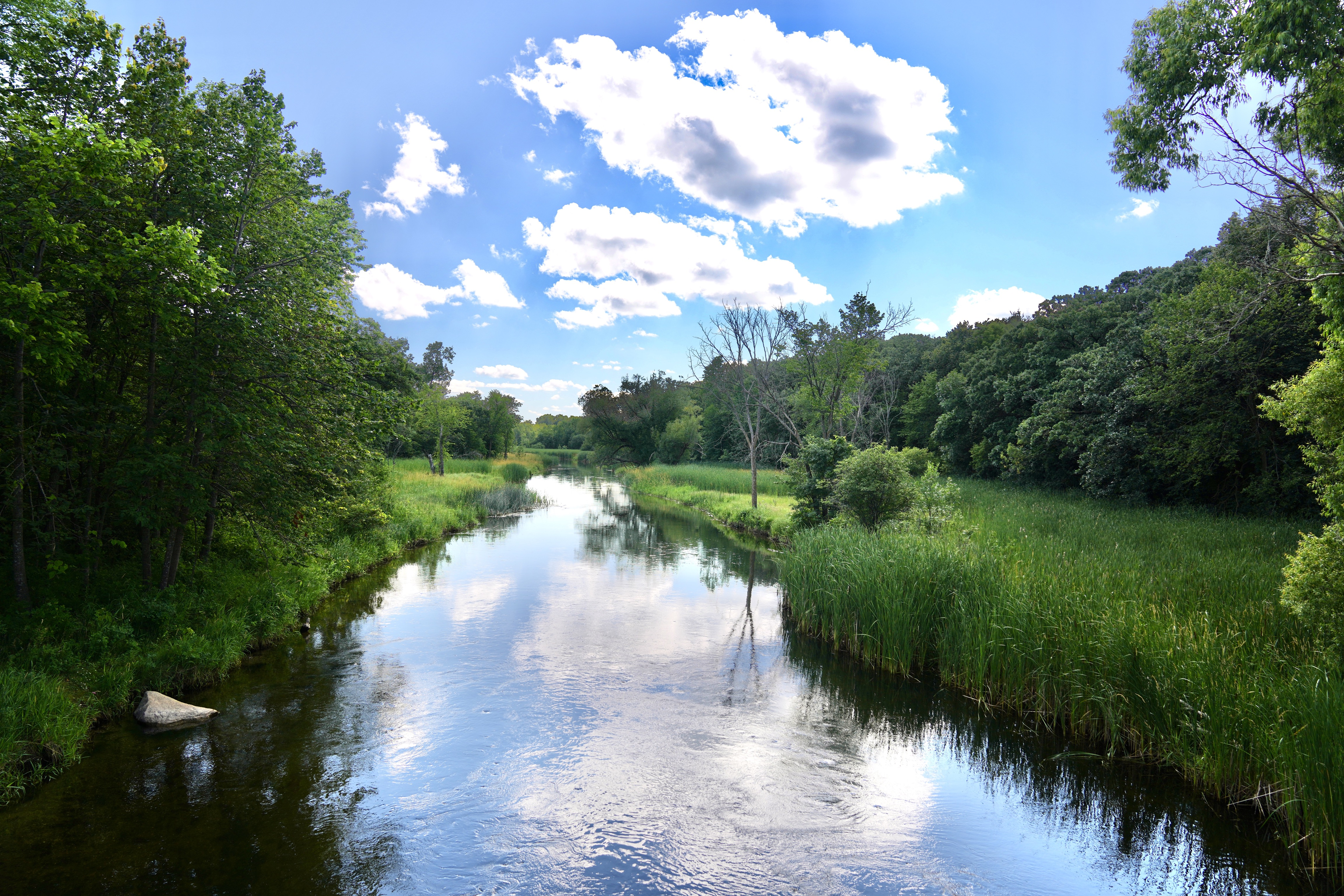
- Pelican River near Becker County Road 20, Detroit Lakes, Minnesota

Location
- Country: United States

Physical characteristics
- Source
  - location: Minnesota

The Pelican River is an 85.3-mile-long (137.3 km) tributary of the Otter Tail River of Minnesota in the United States.

Pelican River is an English translation of the native Ojibwe language name.

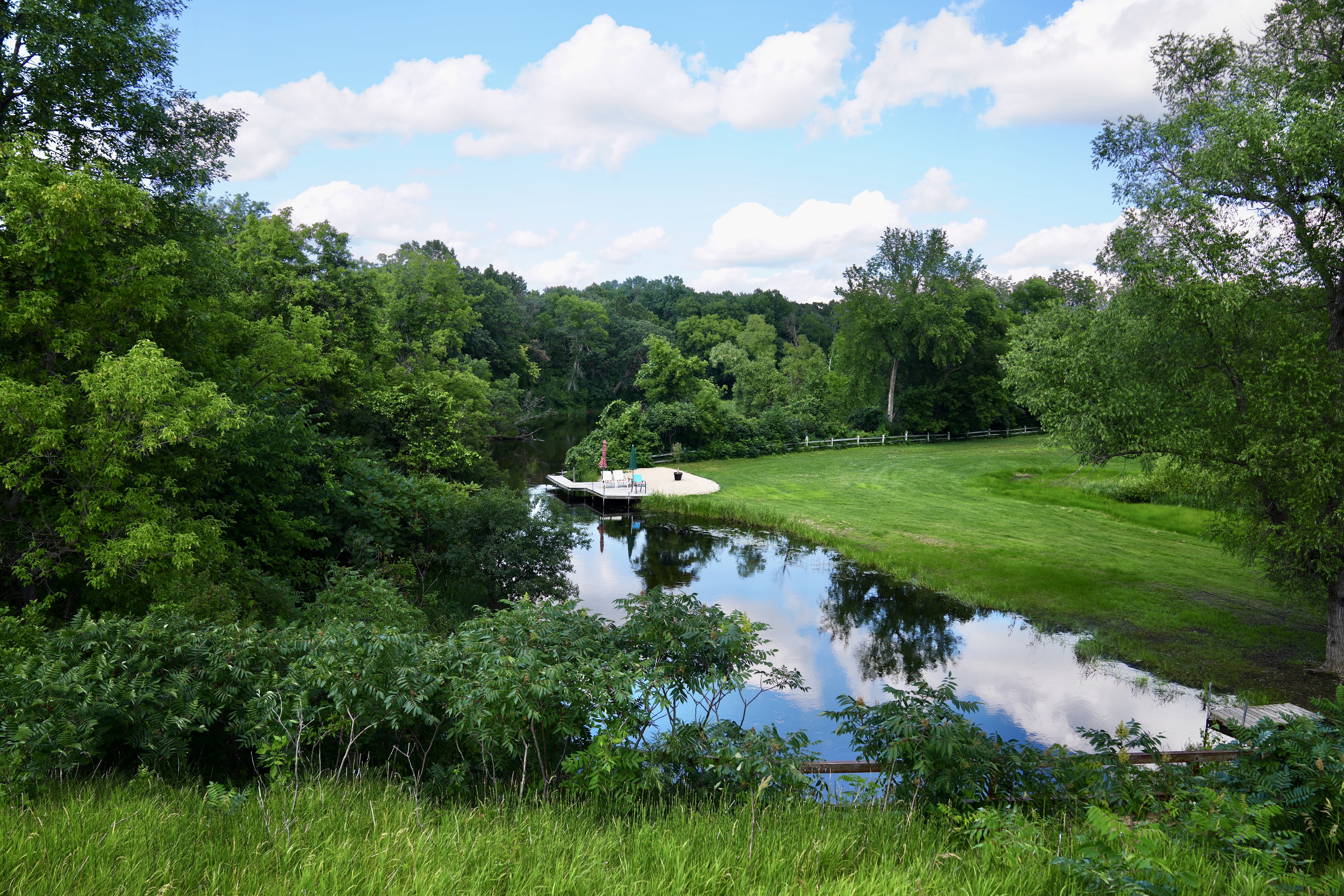
Pelican River, Becker County, Minnesota

== See also ==
- List of rivers of Minnesota
