= West Twin River (Washington) =

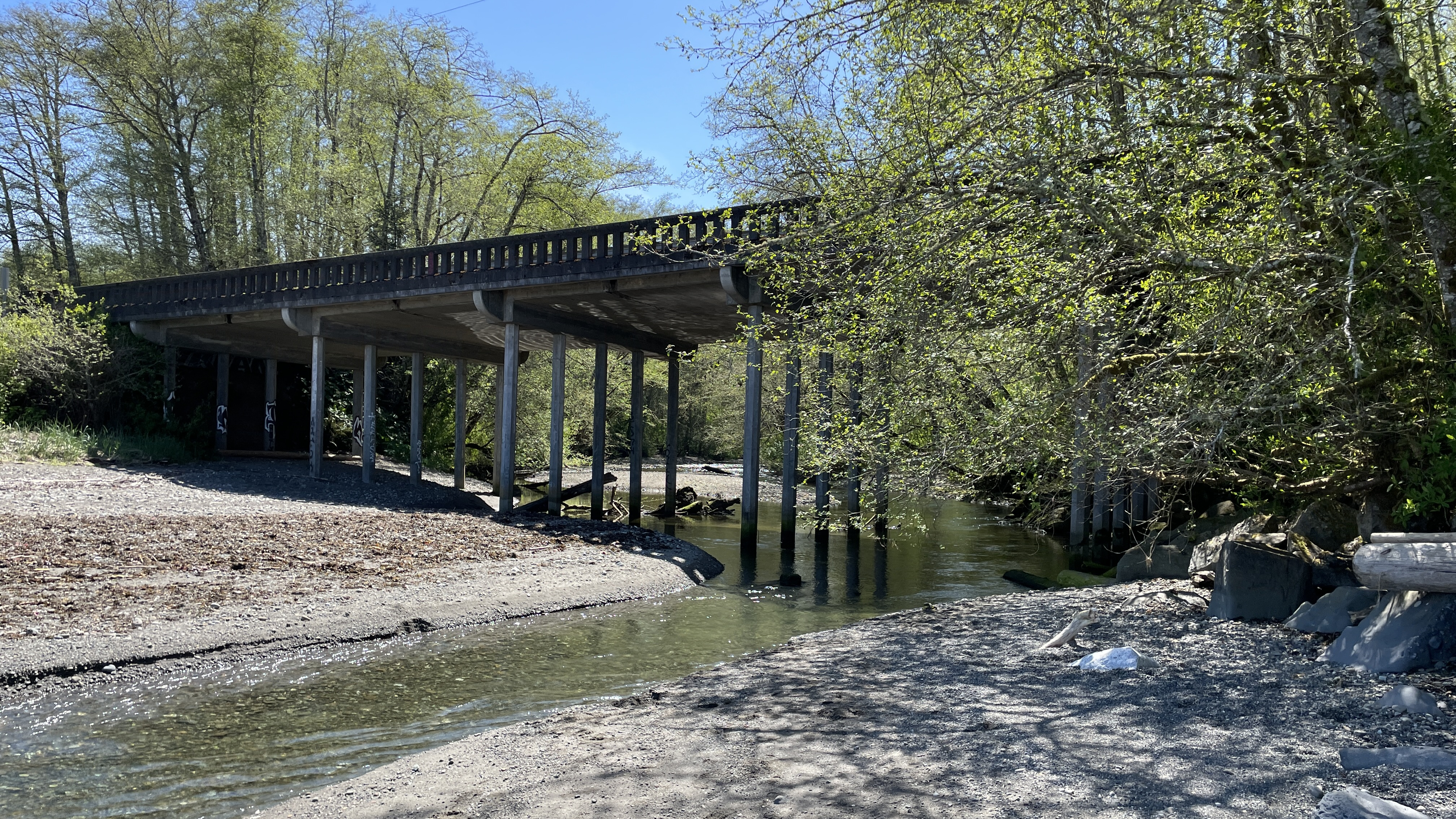
- Bridge on Washington State Route 112 crossing over the West Twin River.

- Location of the mouth of the West Twin River in Washington

Location
- Country: United States
- State: Washington
- County: Clallam

Physical characteristics
- Source: Olympic Mountains
  - coordinates: 48°6′11″N 124°2′32″W
- Mouth: Strait of Juan de Fuca
  - coordinates: 48°9′56″N 123°57′10″W

The West Twin River is a stream on the Olympic Peninsula in the U.S. state of Washington. It originates in the northern Olympic Mountains and flows north, emptying into the Strait of Juan de Fuca just east of East Twin River.

== Course ==
The West Twin River originates in the Olympic National Forest in the northern portion of Olympic Peninsula. It flows north and east, entering the Strait of Juan de Fuca near the town of Twin, less than 0.5 miles (0.80 km) east of the mouth of the East Twin River.

== See also ==
- List of rivers of Washington (state)
