= Middle Cormorant Lake =

Lake in Minnesota, U.S.

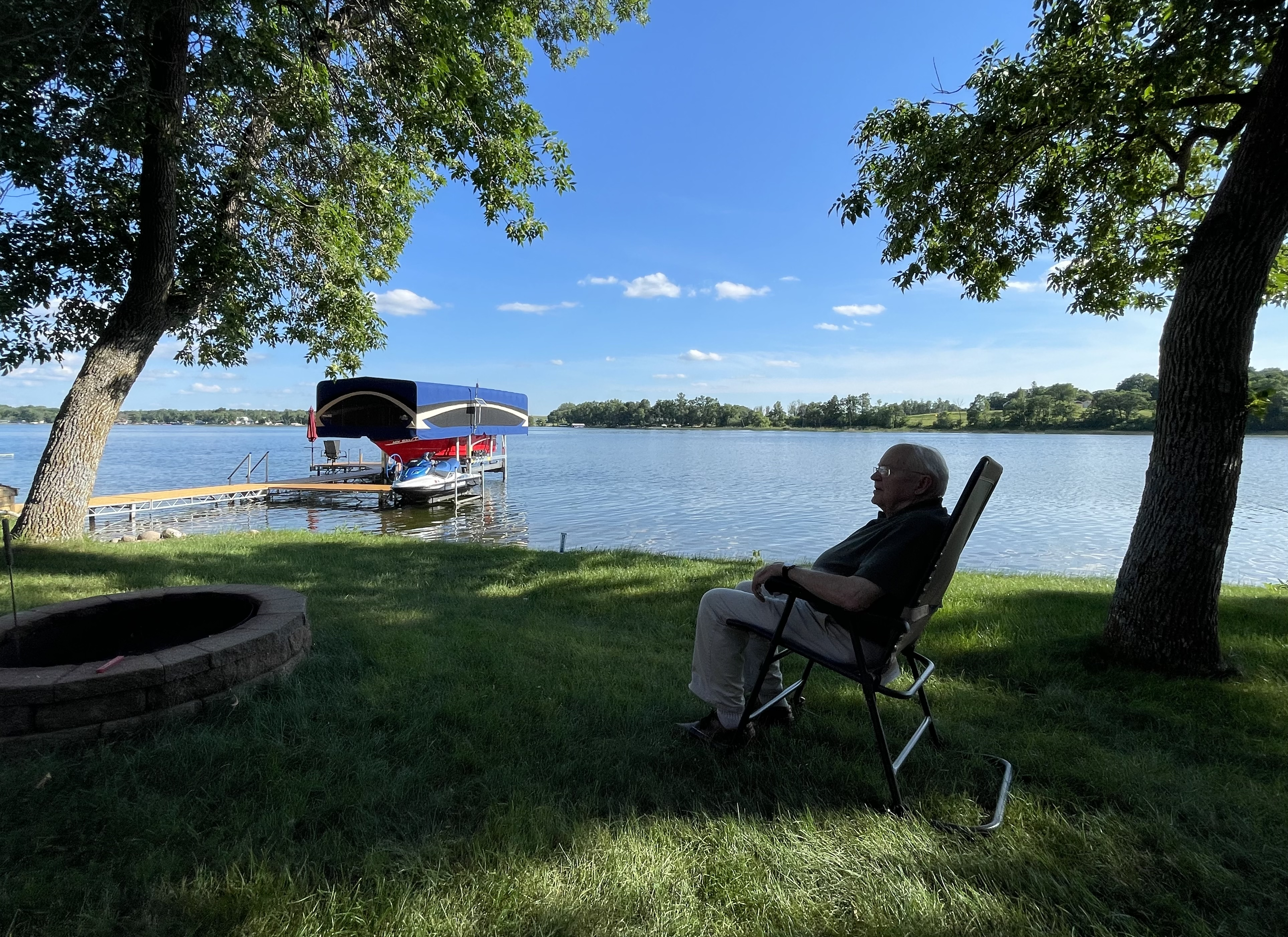
- Middle Cormorant Lake July 8, 2022

- Location within Minnesota
- Location: Becker County, Minnesota
- Coordinates: 46°45′25.6″N 96°06′23.8″W
- Basin countries: United States
- Surface area: 365 acres (148 ha)
- Max. depth: 40 feet (12 m)
- Shore length^{1}: 3.7 miles (6.0 km)
- ^{1} Shore length is not a well-defined measure.

Middle Cormorant Lake is a ground water-seepage freshwater lake with no inflow or outflow that is located south of the Audubon Township in Becker County, Minnesota. The lake has a surface area of 924 to 1,067 acres (374 to 432 ha) with a maximum depth of about 40 feet (12 m) and an average depth of about 17 feet (5.2 m). The lake contains many fish species including Walleye, Yellow Bullhead, Largemouth Bass, Northern Pike, Rock Bass, Yellow Perch, Black Bullhead, Bluegill and Brown Bullhead.
