= Lida Junction Airport =

- IATA: none; ICAO: none; FAA LID: 0L4

Summary
- Airport type: Public
- Owner: United States Bureau of Land Management
- Serves: Goldfield, Nevada
- Elevation AMSL: 4,684 ft / 1,428 m
- Coordinates: 37°29′31″N 117°11′18″W

Map
- Location of airport in Nevada 0L4 (the United States)

Runways
Direction	Length		Surface
Direction	ft	m	Surface
18/36	6,100	1,859	Dirt
- Source: Federal Aviation Administration

Lida Junction Airport (FAA LID: 0L4) is a public use airport located 14 nautical miles (16 mi, 26 km) south of the central business district of Goldfield, in Esmeralda County, Nevada, United States. The airport is owned by the United States Bureau of Land Management.

== History ==
The runway was built to provide access to the Kit Cat Ranch. It sits adjacent to the former Cottontail Ranch.

== Facilities ==
Lida Junction Airport covers an area of 168 acres (68 ha) at an elevation of 4,684 feet (1,428 m) above mean sea level. It has one runway designated 18/36 with a dirt surface measuring 6,100 by 80 feet (1,859 by 24 m).

== See also ==
- List of airports in Nevada
