= Lida Township, Otter Tail County, Minnesota =

Lida Township, Minnesota
- Township
- Location of Lida Township, within Otter Tail County, Minnesota

- Location within the state of Minnesota Lida Township, Minnesota (the United States)
- Coordinates: 46°36′6″N 95°57′39″W
- Country: United States
- State: Minnesota
- County: Otter Tail

Area
  - Total: 35.6 sq mi (92.3 km^{2})
  - Land: 20.6 sq mi (53.4 km^{2})
  - Water: 15.0 sq mi (38.9 km^{2})
- Elevation: 1,300 ft (400 m)

Population (2020)
  - Total: 780
  - Density: 38/sq mi (15/km^{2})
- Time zone: UTC-6 (Central (CST))
  - Summer (DST): UTC-5 (CDT)
- FIPS code: 27-36980
- GNIS feature ID: 0664778

Lida Township is a township in Otter Tail County, Minnesota, United States. The population was 780 at the 2020 census.

Lida Township was organized in 1879, and named for Lake Lida.

== Geography ==
According to the United States Census Bureau, the township has a total area of 35.6 square miles (92 km^{2}), of which 20.6 square miles (53 km^{2}) is land and 15.0 square miles (39 km^{2}) (42.14%) is water.

== Demographics ==
As of the census of 2000, there were 697 people, 297 households, and 223 families living in the township. The population density was 33.8 inhabitants per square mile (13.1/km^{2}). There were 976 housing units at an average density of 47.4 per square mile (18.3/km^{2}). The racial makeup of the township was 99.57% White, 0.29% Native American, and 0.14% from two or more races. Hispanic or Latino of any race were 0.14% of the population.

There were 297 households, out of which 24.9% had children under the age of 18 living with them, 70.7% were married couples living together, 1.3% had a female householder with no husband present, and 24.6% were non-families. 21.2% of all households were made up of individuals, and 8.8% had someone living alone who was 65 years of age or older. The average household size was 2.35 and the average family size was 2.71.

In the township the population was spread out, with 20.9% under the age of 18, 4.2% from 18 to 24, 22.4% from 25 to 44, 32.9% from 45 to 64, and 19.7% who were 65 years of age or older. The median age was 47 years. For every 100 females, there were 102.0 males. For every 100 females age 18 and over, there were 110.3 males.

The median income for a household in the township was $42,222, and the median income for a family was $48,409. Males had a median income of $35,288 versus $22,396 for females. The per capita income for the township was $22,291. About 6.3% of families and 7.1% of the population were below the poverty line, including 4.6% of those under age 18 and 13.7% of those age 65 or over.
