= Kettle River (Blueberry River tributary) =

- Location of the mouth of the Kettle River

Location
- Country: United States
- State: Minnesota

Physical characteristics
- Source
  - location: Spruce Grove Township, Becker County
  - coordinates: 46°47′52″N 95°20′32″W
  - elevation: 1,550 ft (470 m)
- Mouth: Blueberry River
  - location: Blueberry Township, Wadena County
  - coordinates: 46°45′51″N 95°08′20″W
  - elevation: 1,381 ft (421 m)
- Length: 17.2 mi (27.7 km)

The Kettle River, also known as Kettle Creek, is a tributary of the Blueberry River, 17 miles (28 km) long, in north-central Minnesota in the United States. Via the Blueberry, Shell, and Crow Wing Rivers, it is part of the watershed of the Mississippi River, draining a rural area.

The Blueberry River rises approximately one mile (2 km) south of Wolf Lake in Spruce Grove Township in southeastern Becker County and flows generally eastwardly through Runeberg Township into northwestern Wadena County. It flows into the Blueberry River in Blueberry Township, approximately two miles (3 km) west of Menahga. The Kettle River flows in the Northern Lakes and Forests ecoregion, which is characterized by conifer and hardwood forests on flat and rolling till plains and outwash plains.

== See also ==
- List of rivers in Minnesota
