= Runeberg Township, Becker County, Minnesota =

Runeberg Township, Minnesota
- Township
- Location of Runeberg Township, within Becker County, Minnesota

- Location within the state of Minnesota Runeberg Township, Minnesota (the United States)
- Coordinates: 46°46′7″N 95°13′1″W
- Country: United States
- State: Minnesota
- County: Becker

Area
  - Total: 35.7 sq mi (92.5 km^{2})
  - Land: 35.7 sq mi (92.5 km^{2})
  - Water: 0.039 sq mi (0.1 km^{2})
- Elevation: 1,519 ft (463 m)

Population (2020)
  - Total: 639
  - Density: 17.9/sq mi (6.91/km^{2})
- Time zone: UTC-6 (Central (CST))
  - Summer (DST): UTC-5 (CDT)
- ZIP code: 56464
- Area code: 218
- FIPS code: 27-56248
- GNIS feature ID: 0665485

Runeberg Township is a township in Becker County, Minnesota, United States. The population was 639 as of the 2020 census.

== History ==
Runeberg was organized in 1887. It was named for J. L. Runeberg, a Swedo-Finnish national poet of Finland.

== Geography ==
According to the United States Census Bureau, the township has a total area of 35.7 square miles (92.5 km^{2}), of which 35.7 square miles (92.5 km^{2}) is land and 0.04 square miles (0.1 km^{2}) (0.06%) is water. The Blueberry and Kettle Rivers flow through the township.

=== Major highway ===
- Minnesota State Highway 87

=== Lakes ===
- Lake Katie (east quarter)

=== Adjacent townships ===
- Green Valley Township (north)
- Straight River Township, Hubbard County (northeast)
- Blueberry Township, Wadena County (east)
- Red Eye Township, Wadena County (southeast)
- Paddock Township, Otter Tail County (south)
- Spruce Grove Township (west)
- Wolf Lake Township (northwest)

== Demographics ==
As of the census of 2000, there were 387 people, 130 households, and 101 families residing in the township. The population density was 10.8 people per square mile (4.2/km^{2}). There were 153 housing units at an average density of 4.3/sq mi (1.7/km^{2}). The racial makeup of the township was 97.42% White and 2.58% Native American. Hispanic or Latino of any race were 0.26% of the population.

There were 130 households, out of which 35.4% had children under the age of 18 living with them, 66.2% were married couples living together, 3.8% had a female householder with no husband present, and 22.3% were non-families. 20.0% of all households were made up of individuals, and 6.2% had someone living alone who was 65 years of age or older. The average household size was 2.98 and the average family size was 3.43.

In the township the population was spread out, with 29.7% under the age of 18, 9.3% from 18 to 24, 23.8% from 25 to 44, 23.8% from 45 to 64, and 13.4% who were 65 years of age or older. The median age was 37 years. For every 100 females, there were 127.6 males. For every 100 females age 18 and over, there were 126.7 males.

The median income for a household in the township was $36,500, and the median income for a family was $41,667. Males had a median income of $27,946 versus $18,333 for females. The per capita income for the township was $13,747. About 7.1% of families and 10.4% of the population were below the poverty line, including 8.0% of those under age 18 and 24.0% of those age 65 or over.
