= Wolf Lake Township, Becker County, Minnesota =

Wolf Lake Township, Minnesota
- Township
- Location of Wolf Lake Township, within Becker County, Minnesota

- Location within the state of Minnesota Wolf Lake Township, Minnesota (the United States)
- Coordinates: 46°50′35″N 95°21′54″W
- Country: United States
- State: Minnesota
- County: Becker

Area
  - Total: 35.9 sq mi (93.0 km^{2})
  - Land: 33.1 sq mi (85.8 km^{2})
  - Water: 2.8 sq mi (7.2 km^{2})
- Elevation: 1,604 ft (489 m)

Population (2020)
  - Total: 272
  - Density: 8.21/sq mi (3.17/km^{2})
- Time zone: UTC-6 (Central (CST))
  - Summer (DST): UTC-5 (CDT)
- ZIP code: 56593
- Area code: 218
- FIPS code: 27-71356
- GNIS feature ID: 0666035

Wolf Lake Township is a township in Becker County, Minnesota, United States. The population was 272 as of the 2020 census.

== History ==
Wolf Lake Township was organized in 1896. It took its name from Wolf Lake.

== Geography ==
According to the United States Census Bureau, the township has a total area of 35.9 square miles (93.0 km^{2}), of which 33.1 square miles (85.8 km^{2}) is land and 2.8 square miles (7.3 km^{2}) (7.80%) is water.

The vast majority of the city of Wolf Lake is within this township geographically but is a separate entity.

=== Major highway ===
- Minnesota State Highway 34

=== Lakes ===
- Branch Lake
- Cliff Lake
- Dog Lake
- Goose Lake
- Island Lake
- Otter Lake
- Peninsula Lake
- Pickerel Lake
- Section Ten Lake
- Spot Lake
- Wolf Lake (vast majority)

=== Adjacent townships ===
- Carsonville Township (north)
- Green Valley Township (east)
- Runeberg Township (southeast)
- Spruce Grove Township (south)
- Evergreen Township (southwest)
- Toad Lake Township (west)
- Shell Lake Township (northwest)

=== Cemeteries ===
The township contains these three cemeteries: Palm, Pickerel and Wolf Lake Community.

== Demographics ==
As of the census of 2000, there were 227 people, 68 households, and 49 families residing in the township. The population density was 6.9 people per square mile (2.6/km^{2}). There were 83 housing units at an average density of 2.5/sq mi (1.0/km^{2}). The racial makeup of the township was 99.12% White, and 0.88% from two or more races.

There were 68 households, out of which 35.3% had children under the age of 18 living with them, 58.8% were married couples living together, 10.3% had a female householder with no husband present, and 27.9% were non-families. 25.0% of all households were made up of individuals, and 11.8% had someone living alone who was 65 years of age or older. The average household size was 3.34 and the average family size was 4.18.

In the township the population was spread out, with 40.1% under the age of 18, 6.6% from 18 to 24, 17.6% from 25 to 44, 22.0% from 45 to 64, and 13.7% who were 65 years of age or older. The median age was 37 years. For every 100 females, there were 99.1 males. For every 100 females age 18 and over, there were 106.1 males.

The median income for a household in the township was $25,250, and the median income for a family was $35,000. Males had a median income of $27,500 versus $16,786 for females. The per capita income for the township was $10,622. About 21.4% of families and 41.0% of the population were below the poverty line, including 56.2% of those under the age of eighteen and 8.3% of those 65 or over.
