= Green Valley Township, Becker County, Minnesota =

Green Valley Township, Minnesota
- Township
- Location of Green Valley Township, within Becker County, Minnesota

- Location within the state of Minnesota Green Valley Township, Minnesota (the United States)
- Coordinates: 46°49′48″N 95°12′38″W
- Country: United States
- State: Minnesota
- County: Becker

Area
  - Total: 35.9 sq mi (93.1 km^{2})
  - Land: 35.4 sq mi (91.8 km^{2})
  - Water: 0.50 sq mi (1.3 km^{2})
- Elevation: 1,450 ft (442 m)

Population (2020)
  - Total: 348
  - Density: 9.82/sq mi (3.79/km^{2})
- Time zone: UTC-6 (Central (CST))
  - Summer (DST): UTC-5 (CDT)
- FIPS code: 27-25820
- GNIS feature ID: 0664347

Green Valley Township is a township in Becker County, Minnesota, United States. The population was 348 as of the 2020 census.

== History ==
Green Valley Township was organized in 1886. It was named for the green valley of the Shell River.

== Geography ==
According to the United States Census Bureau, the township has a total area of 36.0 square miles (93 km^{2}), of which 35.4 square miles (92 km^{2}) is land and 0.5 square miles (1.3 km^{2}) (1.45%) is water. The Shell River flows southeastwardly through the township, and the Blueberry River has its headwaters in the township.

=== Lakes ===
- Blueberry Lake
- Brush Lake
- Knutson Lake
- Little Lake
- Little Long Lake
- Little Round Lake
- Shipman Lake

=== Adjacent townships ===
- Osage Township (north)
- Todd Township, Hubbard County (northeast)
- Straight River Township, Hubbard County (east)
- Blueberry Township, Wadena County (southeast)
- Runeberg Township (south)
- Spruce Grove Township (southwest)
- Wolf Lake Township (west)
- Carsonville Township (northwest)

=== Cemeteries ===
The township contains Green Valley Cemetery.

== Demographics ==
As of the census of 2000, there were 346 people, 124 households, and 90 families residing in the township. The population density was 9.8 inhabitants per square mile (3.8/km^{2}). There were 165 housing units at an average density of 4.7 per square mile (1.8/km^{2}). The racial makeup of the township was 95.95% White, 1.16% Native American, 0.87% from other races, and 2.02% from two or more races. Hispanic or Latino of any race were 1.73% of the population.

There were 124 households, out of which 33.9% had children under the age of 18 living with them, 62.1% were married couples living together, 4.8% had a female householder with no husband present, and 27.4% were non-families. 25.0% of all households were made up of individuals, and 9.7% had someone living alone who was 65 years of age or older. The average household size was 2.79 and the average family size was 3.40.

In the township the population was spread out, with 29.5% under the age of 18, 7.5% from 18 to 24, 23.1% from 25 to 44, 26.9% from 45 to 64, and 13.0% who were 65 years of age or older. The median age was 39 years. For every 100 females, there were 107.2 males. For every 100 females age 18 and over, there were 112.2 males.

The median income for a household in the township was $40,417, and the median income for a family was $41,806. Males had a median income of $28,542 versus $18,750 for females. The per capita income for the township was $15,149. About 11.4% of families and 13.7% of the population were below the poverty line, including 5.1% of those under age 18 and 34.5% of those age 65 or over.
