= Hubbard =

Hubbard may refer to:

== Places ==
=== Antarctica ===
- Mount Hubbard (Antarctica), a mountain on Thurston Island

=== Canada ===
- Hubbard, Saskatchewan
- Hubbards, Nova Scotia

=== Canada/United States ===
- Mount Hubbard, a mountain on the Alaska/Yukon border
- Hubbard Glacier, a large freshwater glacier in Alaska and Yukon

=== Greenland ===
- Hubbard Glacier (Greenland), a glacier in the Inglefield Gulf

=== United States ===
- Hubbard, Iowa
- Hubbard, Minnesota
- Hubbard, Missouri
- Hubbard, Nebraska
- Hubbard, Ohio
- Hubbard, Oregon
- Hubbard, Texas
- Hubbard, Dodge County, Wisconsin
- Hubbard, Rusk County, Wisconsin
- Hubbard County, Minnesota
- Hubbard Lake, Michigan (disambiguation)
- Hubbard Township, Hubbard County, Minnesota
- Hubbard Township, Polk County, Minnesota
- Hubbard Township, Trumbull County, Ohio
- Hubbard Brook Experimental Forest, an outdoor laboratory for ecological studies in central New Hampshire
- Hubbard Creek, Texas
- Hubbard Street, in Chicago, Illinois
- Lake Ray Hubbard, a freshwater lake in Dallas and Rockwall County, Texas

== People ==
- Hubbard (surname), a surname
- Fern Hubbard Orme (1903–1993), American educator and politician

== Other ==
- Hubbard Broadcasting, a radio and television broadcaster based in Minneapolis
- Hubbard Medal, awarded by the National Geographic Society for distinction in exploration, discovery, and research
- Hubbard model, in physics, a model for correlated electrons
- Hubbard squash (Cucurbita maxima), a variety of winter squash
- "Old Mother Hubbard", a nursery rhyme

== See also ==
- Hubbard Lake (disambiguation)
- Hubard, a surname
