= Osage Township, Becker County, Minnesota =

Osage Township, Minnesota
- Township
- Location of Osage Township, within Becker County, Minnesota

- Location within the state of Minnesota Osage Township, Minnesota (the United States)
- Coordinates: 46°55′30″N 95°14′13″W
- Country: United States
- State: Minnesota
- County: Becker

Area
  - Total: 35.8 sq mi (92.8 km^{2})
  - Land: 34.9 sq mi (90.4 km^{2})
  - Water: 0.93 sq mi (2.4 km^{2})
- Elevation: 1,473 ft (449 m)

Population (2020)
  - Total: 885
  - Density: 25.4/sq mi (9.79/km^{2})
- Time zone: UTC-6 (Central (CST))
  - Summer (DST): UTC-5 (CDT)
- ZIP code: 56570
- Area code: 218
- FIPS code: 27-48778
- GNIS feature ID: 0665223

Osage Township is a township in Becker County, Minnesota, United States. The population was 885 as of the 2020 census. It contains the census-designated place of Osage.

Minnesota State Highways 34 and 225 are two of the main arterial routes in the township.

== History ==
The township was named after Osage, Iowa.

== Geography ==
According to the United States Census Bureau, the township has a total area of 35.8 square miles (92.8 km^{2}), of which 34.9 square miles (90.4 km^{2}) is land and 0.9 square miles (2.4 km^{2}) (2.57%) is water. The Straight and Shell Rivers flow southeastwardly through the township.

=== Major highway ===
- Minnesota State Highway 34

=== Lakes ===
- Bog Lake
- Straight Lake
- Valines Lake

=== Adjacent townships ===
- Two Inlets Township (north)
- Arago Township, Hubbard County (northeast)
- Todd Township, Hubbard County (east)
- Straight River Township, Hubbard County (southeast)
- Green Valley Township (south)
- Carsonville Township (west)

=== Cemeteries ===
The township contains Riverside Cemetery.

== Demographics ==
As of the census of 2000, there were 774 people, 300 households, and 221 families residing in the township. The population density was 22.2 people per square mile (8.6/km^{2}). There were 397 housing units at an average density of 11.4/sq mi (4.4/km^{2}). The racial makeup of the township was 98.19% White, 1.16% Native American, 0.13% from other races, and 0.52% from two or more races. Hispanic or Latino of any race were 0.13% of the population. 35.3% were of German, 13.1% Norwegian, 9.4% Finnish and 7.7% English ancestry according to Census 2000.

There were 300 households, out of which 32.3% had children under the age of 18 living with them, 67.3% were married couples living together, 2.7% had a female householder with no husband present, and 26.3% were non-families. 23.0% of all households were made up of individuals, and 11.7% had someone living alone who was 65 years of age or older. The average household size was 2.58 and the average family size was 3.04.

In the township the population was spread out, with 26.7% under the age of 18, 7.2% from 18 to 24, 27.0% from 25 to 44, 24.3% from 45 to 64, and 14.7% who were 65 years of age or older. The median age was 39 years. For every 100 females, there were 104.8 males. For every 100 females age 18 and over, there were 101.8 males.

The median income for a household in the township was $37,500, and the median income for a family was $41,563. Males had a median income of $32,292 versus $17,375 for females. The per capita income for the township was $14,788. About 3.7% of families and 6.2% of the population were below the poverty line, including 4.6% of those under age 18 and 7.0% of those age 65 or over.
