= Toad Lake =

Toad Lake may refer to:

- Toad Lake (Minnesota)
- Toad Lake (Washington)
- Toad Lake Township, Becker County, Minnesota
