= Hubbard Township, Minnesota =

Hubbard Township may refer to:

- Hubbard Township, Hubbard County, Minnesota
- Hubbard Township, Polk County, Minnesota

== See also ==
- Hubbard Township (disambiguation)
