= Straight River =

Straight River may refer to:

- Straight River (central Minnesota), a tributary of the Fish Hook River
- Straight River (southern Minnesota), a tributary of the Cannon River
- Straight River (Wisconsin), a tributary of the Apple River
- Straight River Township, Minnesota
