= Spruce Grove Township, Becker County, Minnesota =

Spruce Grove Township, Minnesota
- Township
- Location of Spruce Grove Township, within Becker County, Minnesota

- Location within the state of Minnesota Spruce Grove Township, Minnesota (the United States)
- Coordinates: 46°45′47″N 95°21′50″W
- Country: United States
- State: Minnesota
- County: Becker

Area
  - Total: 35.7 sq mi (92.4 km^{2})
  - Land: 35.6 sq mi (92.1 km^{2})
  - Water: 0.12 sq mi (0.3 km^{2})
- Elevation: 1,540 ft (470 m)

Population (2020)
  - Total: 406
  - Density: 11.4/sq mi (4.41/km^{2})
- Time zone: UTC-6 (Central (CST))
  - Summer (DST): UTC-5 (CDT)
- FIPS code: 27-62212
- GNIS feature ID: 0665685

Spruce Grove Township is a township in Becker County, Minnesota, United States. The population was 406 as of the 2020 census.

== History ==
Spruce Grove Township was organized in 1889. It was named for the abundant growth of evergreens.

== Geography ==
According to the United States Census Bureau, the township has a total area of 35.7 square miles (92.4 km^{2}), of which 35.6 square miles (92.1 km^{2}) is land and 0.1 square miles (0.3 km^{2}) (0.31%) is water.

The south quarter of the city of Wolf Lake is within this township geographically but is a separate entity.

=== Major highway ===
- Minnesota State Highway 87

=== Lakes ===
- Lake Katie (west three-quarters)
- Mud Lake

=== Adjacent townships ===
- Wolf Lake Township (north)
- Green Valley Township (northeast)
- Runeberg Township (east)
- Paddock Township, Otter Tail County (southeast)
- Butler Township, Otter Tail County (south)
- Corliss Township, Otter Tail County (southwest)
- Evergreen Township (west)
- Toad Lake Township (northwest)

=== Cemeteries ===
The township contains these two cemeteries: Bethany and Spruce Grove.

== Demographics ==
As of the census of 2000, there were 358 people, 131 households, and 94 families residing in the township. The population density was 10.1 people per square mile (3.9/km^{2}). There were 151 housing units at an average density of 4.2/sq mi (1.6/km^{2}). The racial makeup of the township was 96.09% White, 0.28% Native American, 2.79% Asian, and 0.84% from two or more races. Hispanic or Latino of any race were 0.28% of the population.

There were 131 households, out of which 31.3% had children under the age of 18 living with them, 66.4% were married couples living together, 3.1% had a female householder with no husband present, and 28.2% were non-families. 26.0% of all households were made up of individuals, and 15.3% had someone living alone who was 65 years of age or older. The average household size was 2.73 and the average family size was 3.36.

In the township the population was spread out, with 31.0% under the age of 18, 5.6% from 18 to 24, 24.0% from 25 to 44, 26.3% from 45 to 64, and 13.1% who were 65 years of age or older. The median age was 39 years. For every 100 females, there were 109.4 males. For every 100 females age 18 and over, there were 114.8 males.

The median income for a household in the township was $25,341, and the median income for a family was $38,036. Males had a median income of $24,861 versus $18,125 for females. The per capita income for the township was $12,135. About 2.1% of families and 4.7% of the population were below the poverty line, including 1.9% of those under age 18 and 11.3% of those age 65 or over.
