= Blueberry Lake Village Site =

- U.S. National Register of Historic Places
- Location: Address restricted, Blueberry Township, Minnesota
- NRHP reference No.: 73000996
- Designated: October 2, 1973

The Blueberry Lake Village Site (Smithsonian trinomial 21WD6) is a prehistoric Native American archaeological site in Blueberry Township, Minnesota, United States. It consists of a habitation site, possibly seasonal, whose period and duration of occupation is uncertain. It was listed on the National Register of Historic Places in 1973 for its state-level significance in the theme of archaeology. It was nominated as one of the few surviving archaeological sites in the Shell River basin of northwestern Wadena County, the region's most conducive zone for prehistoric human habitation.

== Geography ==
To the south and southeast of the Blueberry Lake Village Site lies the former basin of Glacial Lake Wadena, a poorly drained area of few lakes that likely provided little in the way of subsistence resources. Human habitation, therefore, was concentrated in the Shell River area, which lies on the southern edge of a large outwash plain extending through half of Hubbard County to the north. This region was characterized by rolling hills and shallow bodies of water, like Blueberry Lake, that would have supported abundant stands of wild rice. This region was also usefully situated between the coniferous forest to the north and the deciduous forest and prairie to the south. Additionally the river, which flows through Blueberry Lake, provided a good water transportation corridor between the Crow Wing River and the next drainage basin to the west.

== History ==
While conducting an archaeological field survey of Wadena County in 1899, Jacob V. Brower documented some mounds near Blueberry Lake. The mounds were later destroyed by plowing. The adjacent village site received a new survey in 1972 which suggested the site may retain its scientifically valuable stratigraphy.

== See also ==
- National Register of Historic Places listings in Wadena County, Minnesota
