= Evergreen Township, Becker County, Minnesota =

Evergreen Township, Minnesota
- Township
- Location of Evergreen Township, within Becker County, Minnesota

- Location within the state of Minnesota Evergreen Township, Minnesota (the United States)
- Coordinates: 46°45′46″N 95°28′14″W
- Country: United States
- State: Minnesota
- County: Becker

Area
  - Total: 36.4 sq mi (94.2 km^{2})
  - Land: 36.2 sq mi (93.8 km^{2})
  - Water: 0.15 sq mi (0.4 km^{2})
- Elevation: 1,493 ft (455 m)

Population (2020)
  - Total: 403
  - Density: 11.1/sq mi (4.30/km^{2})
- Time zone: UTC-6 (Central (CST))
  - Summer (DST): UTC-5 (CDT)
- FIPS code: 27-20006
- GNIS feature ID: 0664119
- Website: https://evergreentownship.com/

Evergreen Township is a township in Becker County, Minnesota, United States. The population was 403 as of the 2020 census.

== History ==
Evergreen Township was organized in 1888. It was named for the type of trees prevalent in the area.

== Geography ==
According to the United States Census Bureau, the township has a total area of 36.4 square miles (94 km^{2}), of which 36.2 square miles (94 km^{2}) is land and 0.1 square miles (0.26 km^{2}) (0.38%) is water.

=== Major highway ===
- Minnesota State Highway 87

=== Lakes ===
- Collet Lake

=== Adjacent townships ===
- Toad Lake Township (north)
- Wolf Lake Township (northeast)
- Spruce Grove Township (east)
- Butler Township, Otter Tail County (southeast)
- Corliss Township, Otter Tail County (south)
- Gorman Township, Otter Tail County (southwest)
- Silver Leaf Township (west)
- Height of Land Township (northwest)

=== Cemeteries ===
The township contains these two cemeteries: Pickett Family and Saint Paul's.

== Demographics ==
As of the census of 2000, there were 290 people, 102 households, and 83 families residing in the township. The population density was 8.0 inhabitants per square mile (3.1/km^{2}). There were 119 housing units at an average density of 3.3 units per square mile (1.3 units/km^{2}). The racial makeup of the township was 97.24% White, 1.03% Native American, 0.69% Asian, and 1.03% from two or more races. Hispanic or Latino of any race were 1.03% of the population.

There were 102 households, out of which 37.3% had children under the age of 18 living with them, 75.5% were married couples living together, 2.0% had a female householder with no husband present, and 18.6% were non-families. 16.7% of all households were made up of individuals, and 6.9% had someone living alone who was 65 years of age or older. The average household size was 2.84 and the average family size was 3.23.

In the township the population was spread out, with 30.3% under the age of 18, 6.6% from 18 to 24, 26.6% from 25 to 44, 24.5% from 45 to 64, and 12.1% who were 65 years of age or older. The median age was 36 years. For every 100 females, there were 107.1 males. For every 100 females age 18 and over, there were 104.0 males.

The median income for a household in the township was $32,692, and the median income for a family was $33,958. Males had a median income of $21,875 versus $16,786 for females. The per capita income for the township was $14,993. About 11.8% of families and 9.7% of the population were below the poverty line, including 6.8% of those under the age of eighteen and 17.1% of those 65 or over.
