= Shell Lake Township, Becker County, Minnesota =

Shell Lake Township, Minnesota
- Township
- Location of Shell Lake Township, within Becker County, Minnesota

- Location within the state of Minnesota Shell Lake Township, Minnesota (the United States)
- Coordinates: 46°54′51″N 95°28′40″W
- Country: United States
- State: Minnesota
- County: Becker

Area
  - Total: 35.9 sq mi (92.9 km^{2})
  - Land: 28.5 sq mi (73.8 km^{2})
  - Water: 7.4 sq mi (19.2 km^{2})
- Elevation: 1,558 ft (475 m)

Population (2020)
  - Total: 288
  - Density: 10.1/sq mi (3.90/km^{2})
- Time zone: UTC-6 (Central (CST))
  - Summer (DST): UTC-5 (CDT)
- FIPS code: 27-59512
- GNIS feature ID: 0665588

Shell Lake Township is a township in Becker County, Minnesota, United States. The population was 288 as of the 2020 census.

== History ==
Shell Lake Township was organized in 1897. The township took its name from Shell Lake.

== Geography ==
According to the United States Census Bureau, the township has a total area of 35.9 square miles (92.9 km^{2}), of which 28.5 square miles (73.8 km^{2}) is land and 7.4 square miles (19.2 km^{2}) (20.65%) is water.

=== Lakes ===
- Bass Lake
- Brenun Lake
- Dumbbell Lake
- Island Lake (vast majority)
- Jones Lake
- Lake Twentyfive (east edge)
- Mud Lake
- Shell Lake (vast majority)

=== Adjacent townships ===
- Round Lake Township (north)
- Pine Point Township (northeast)
- Carsonville Township (east)
- Wolf Lake Township (southeast)
- Toad Lake Township (south)
- Height of Land Township (west)

=== Cemeteries ===
The township contains Emmanuel Lutheran Cemetery.

== Demographics ==
As of the census of 2000, there were 314 people, 135 households, and 90 families residing in the township. The population density was 11.0 people per square mile (4.3/km^{2}). There were 247 housing units at an average density of 8.7/sq mi (3.3/km^{2}). The racial makeup of the township was 95.22% White, 4.14% Native American, and 0.64% from two or more races.

There were 135 households, out of which 22.2% had children under the age of 18 living with them, 56.3% were married couples living together, 5.2% had a female householder with no husband present, and 32.6% were non-families. 25.9% of all households were made up of individuals, and 6.7% had someone living alone who was 65 years of age or older. The average household size was 2.33 and the average family size was 2.81.

In the township the population was spread out, with 21.7% under the age of 18, 5.7% from 18 to 24, 27.1% from 25 to 44, 32.2% from 45 to 64, and 13.4% who were 65 years of age or older. The median age was 42 years. For every 100 females, there were 115.1 males. For every 100 females age 18 and over, there were 113.9 males.

The median income for a household in the township was $34,375, and the median income for a family was $34,167. Males had a median income of $26,250 versus $23,333 for females. The per capita income for the township was $16,107. About 5.1% of families and 9.8% of the population were below the poverty line, including 19.3% of those under age 18 and 13.9% of those age 65 or over.
