= Yellow Bluffs archeological site =

The Yellow Bluffs archeological site was occupied by people of the Middle Woodland Havana Tradition and consists of a habitation area and various burial mounds. The primary occupation of the Yellow Bluffs site, be it continuous or discrete, can be traced back to 200 B.C.E through 400 C.E. but the site represents activity from numerous prehistoric eras. The archaeological site can be found in Logan County, central Illinois and is closely linked to the Sangamon River drainage network. It is one of the larger known sites in the Sangamon River valley.

== Excavation history and mapping ==
=== Site mapping ===
The site was officially first visited by professional archaeologists from the Illinois Archaeological Survey(IAS) in 1957, however little data was recorded. In 1974, many years later, archaeologist John Claflin visited the site and was the first to report the presence of at least 17 burial mounds heavily impacted by prior indiscriminate disturbances or looting. The last official mapping and site assessment of Yellow Bluffs occurred in 1997 by the Illinois Transportation Archaeological Research Program (ITARP). This third investigation used GPS, Universal Transverse Mercater (UTM), and Sokkia electronic total station equipment to systematically map the Yellow Bluffs site. The ITARP's 1997 investigation yielded the most up-to-date site map which revealed the possibility of up to 23 mounds arranged in two distinct sections, The West Group and The East Group.

=== Site topography ===
The topography of the Yellow Bluffs location is attributed to Pleistocene glaciations which created the surrounding landforms and drainage systems. Today, Logan county is found on a rolling glacial till plain situated between two pronounced glacial moraine ridge systems. The prehistoric environmental conditions of the Yellow Bluffs site differed from the typical central Illinois landscape in two ways. The site remarkably had a large lake feature along with the presence of an area with dense woodland vegetation.

== Artifacts recovered ==
=== Points and pottery ===
Artifacts found at the Yellow Bluffs site can be dated to times ranging from the Archaic period to the Mississippian period. The artifacts found dating back to the Early Archaic period primarily consist of a variety of point types including Thebes, Kirk, and Hardin Barbed. Similarly, a range of Middle to Late Archaic period point styles are also present with a notable Archaic Riverton Culture presence. Early Woodland components are represented at Yellow Bluffs by the existence of Liverpool Series (Black Sand) ceramics. The presence of Morton-style ceramics could relate to either an Early Woodland or an early Middle Woodland occupation. Subsequently, an extensive array of Middle Woodland artifacts are indicative of the primary occupation period.

== Site occupation ==
The temporal limits of the Middle Woodland period vary in different parts of the state. In the central Illinois River valley, the period is divided into separate phases spanning 450–600 years from around 250 B.C.E through 400 C.E. Middle Woodland sites can be found distributed throughout the state but are generally associated with areas of both large and small drainage systems. The larger, more notable concentration of Middle Woodland Havana Traditional sites typically lie within the major river drainages. Due to the lack of proper investigation, information on these Middle Woodland sites is severely limited. Sites are primarily defined on the basis of artifacts recovered.

The Middle Woodland time period is affiliated with an extensive trade network involving the sharing of beliefs/rituals, artifacts, wares, and raw materials. This interaction is labelled the Hopewell Interaction Sphere. There is also scattered evidence of minor Late Woodland activity. The most recent site components, triangular points and shell-tempered ceramics, date to the era when Mississippian cultural influences were beginning to reach the Sangamon River valley. The triangular projectile points and shell-tempered ceramics could indicate Mississippian populations were occupying in nearby regions and interacting with the local Late Woodland populations.
