= Hubbard Township =

Hubbard Township is the name of a few townships in the United States:

- Hubbard Township, Hubbard County, Minnesota
- Hubbard Township, Polk County, Minnesota
- Hubbard Township, Trumbull County, Ohio
