= Spruce Grove (disambiguation) =

Spruce Grove is a city in Alberta, Canada.

Spruce Grove may also refer to:

Canada

- Edmonton—Spruce Grove, federal electoral district in Alberta
- Spruce Grove-Sturgeon-St. Albert, provincial electoral district in Alberta

United States

- Spruce Grove, California, former name of Harris, California
- Spruce Grove Township, Becker County, Minnesota, township in Minnesota
- Spruce Grove Township, Beltrami County, Minnesota, township in Minnesota
