= Minnesota State Highway 226 =

State highway in Minnesota, United States

Trunk Highway 226
- MN 226 highlighted in red

Route information
- Maintained by MnDOT
- Length: 1.494 mi (2.404 km)
- Existed: July 1, 1949–present

Major junctions
- South end: MN 34 in Henrietta Township
- North end: CSAH 7 at Dorset

Location
- Country: United States
- State: Minnesota
- Counties: Hubbard

Highway system
- Minnesota Trunk Highway System; Interstate; US; State; Legislative; Scenic
← MN 225	→ MN 227

Minnesota State Highway 226 (MN 226) is a short 1.494-mile-long (2.404 km) highway in north-central Minnesota, which runs from its intersection with State Highway 34 in Henrietta Township (east of Park Rapids) and continues north to its northern terminus at Dorset. The route becomes Hubbard County Road 7 at Dorset.

== Route description ==
Highway 226 serves as a short north–south connector route between State Highway 34 and the community of Dorset in north-central Minnesota.

The southern terminus of Highway 226 intersects State Highway 34, which is briefly four lanes to facilitate turns and two through lanes. The northern terminus of Highway 226 is approximately one-tenth of a mile north of the Heartland Trail intersection in Dorset, where the route becomes Hubbard County State-Aid Highway 7.

The route is legally defined as Route 226 in the Minnesota Statutes.

== History ==
Highway 226 was authorized on July 1, 1949.

The route was paved at the time it was marked.

== Major intersections ==
The entire route is in Hubbard County.

Location	mi	km	Destinations	Notes
Henrietta Township	0.000	0.000	MN 34 / CSAH 11 south	
Henrietta Township	0.998	1.606	CR 81	
Dorset	1.494	2.404	CSAH 7	
1.000 mi = 1.609 km; 1.000 km = 0.621 mi
