= Fish Hook River =

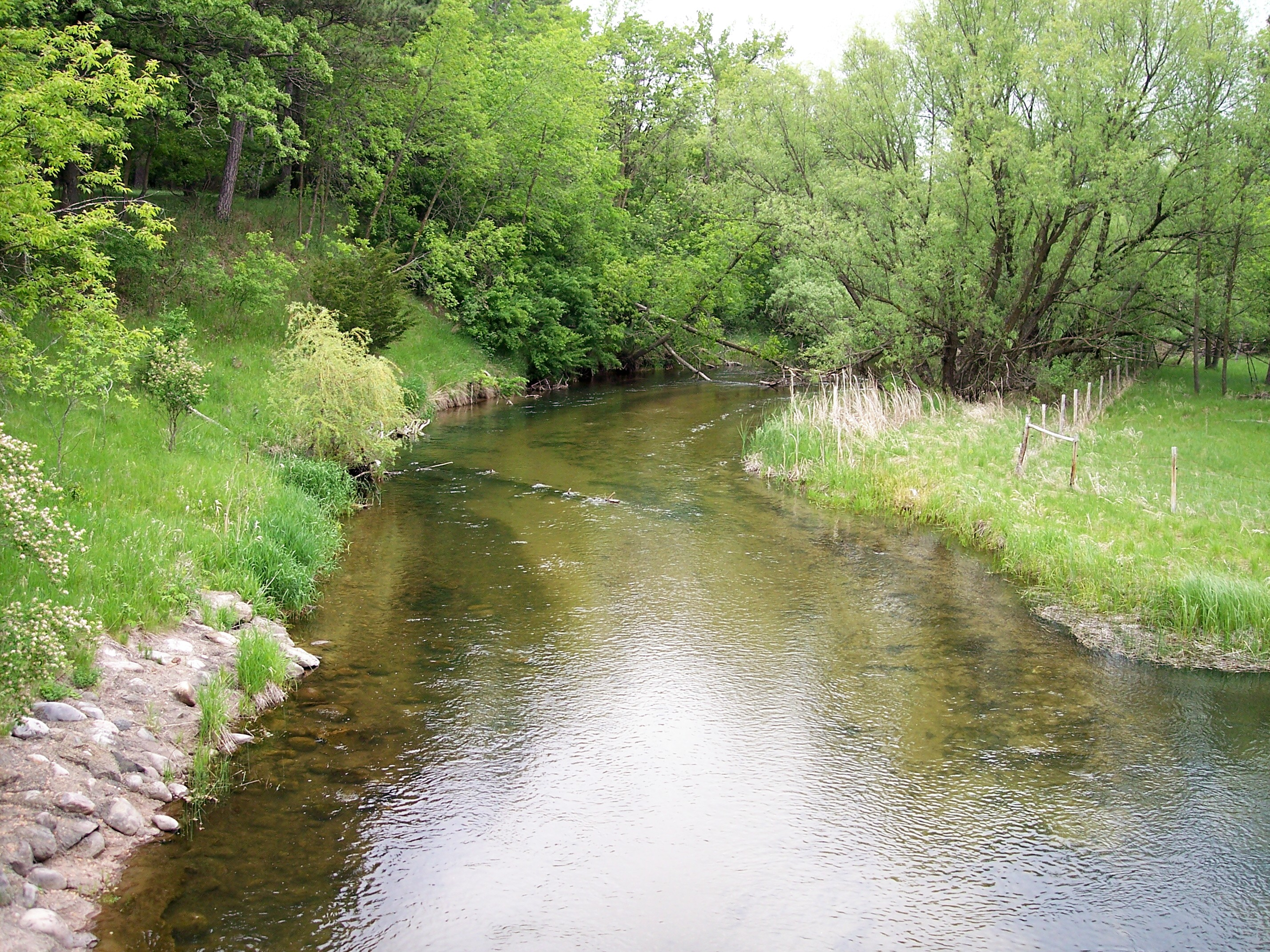
- The Fish Hook River in Park Rapids in 2007

- Location of the mouth of the Fish Hook River

Location
- Country: United States
- State: Minnesota

Physical characteristics
- Source: Fish Hook River Reservoir
  - location: Park Rapids, Hubbard County
  - coordinates: 46°55′10″N 95°03′10″W
  - elevation: 1,424 ft (434 m)
- Mouth: Shell River
  - location: Hubbard Township, Hubbard County
  - coordinates: 46°49′49″N 95°01′55″W
  - elevation: 1,362 ft (415 m)
- Length: 8.54 mi (13.74 km)

Basin features
- Tributaries
  - right: Straight River

The Fish Hook River, also spelled Fishhook River, is a tributary of the Shell River, 9 miles (14 km) long, in north-central Minnesota in the United States. The river's source, Fish Hook Lake, collects short tributaries known as the Portage River and the Potato River. Via the Shell and Crow Wing rivers, the Fish Hook River is part of the watershed of the Mississippi River. The river flows for its entire length in southwestern Hubbard County; its watershed extends into northeastern Becker County.

Its name is a translation of the Ojibwe name for the river and Fish Hook Lake, Pugidabani.

== Geography ==
The Fish Hook River is considered to begin in the city of Park Rapids, at a dam forming the 2-mile-long (3 km) Fish Hook River Reservoir, which was constructed to supply hydropower at the site of rapids on the river. From Park Rapids the Fish Hook River flows south-southeastwardly through Todd, Straight River, and Hubbard townships, collecting the Straight River from the west. It flows into the Shell River from the north in Hubbard Township.

The Fish Hook River Reservoir flows from Fish Hook Lake, which collects the river's northern watershed. The Portage and Potato rivers flow short distances to the lake from Portage and Potato Lakes, respectively. Potato Lake collects Hay Creek, which flows from northeastern Becker County, draining a region of lakes.

The Fish Hook River flows in the Northern Lakes and Forests ecoregion, which is characterized by conifer and hardwood forests on flat and rolling till plains and outwash plains. The river's fish population is dominated by suckers, but walleye and northern pike are also present.

== See also ==
- List of rivers of Minnesota
