= Dorset, Minnesota =

Unincorporated community in Minnesota, United States

Dorset
- Unincorporated community
- Motto: "The Restaurant Capital of the World"
- Location within Minnesota Location within the United States
- Coordinates: 46°57′23″N 94°57′09″W
- Country: United States
- State: Minnesota
- County: Hubbard
- Township: Henrietta

Government
  - Type: Unincorporated Community
  - Mayor (Unofficial): Jade Kruger
- Elevation: 1,476 ft (450 m)

Population
  - Estimate (2011): 24
- Time zone: UTC-6 (Central (CST))
  - Summer (DST): UTC-5 (CDT)
- ZIP code: 56470
- Area code: 218
- GNIS feature ID: 642900

Dorset is an unincorporated community in Henrietta Township, Hubbard County, Minnesota, United States. The population of Dorset is 22. It is a small, unincorporated community in Hubbard County, known as the "Restaurant Capital of the World" due to its high number of restaurants. Dorset is also home to its traditional event "Taste of Dorset" which includes live music, food and beverages, ice cream and desserts, and shops.

The tiny community (population 22) is located 6 mi (9.7 km) east-northeast of Park Rapids and six miles west of Nevis. Hubbard County State-Aid Highways 7 and 18; and State Highway 226 are three of the main routes in the community. State Highway 34 is nearby. Dorset is located along the Heartland State Trail.

== History ==
A post office called Dorset was established in 1898, and remained in operation until it was discontinued in 1964. The community was named by railroad officials.

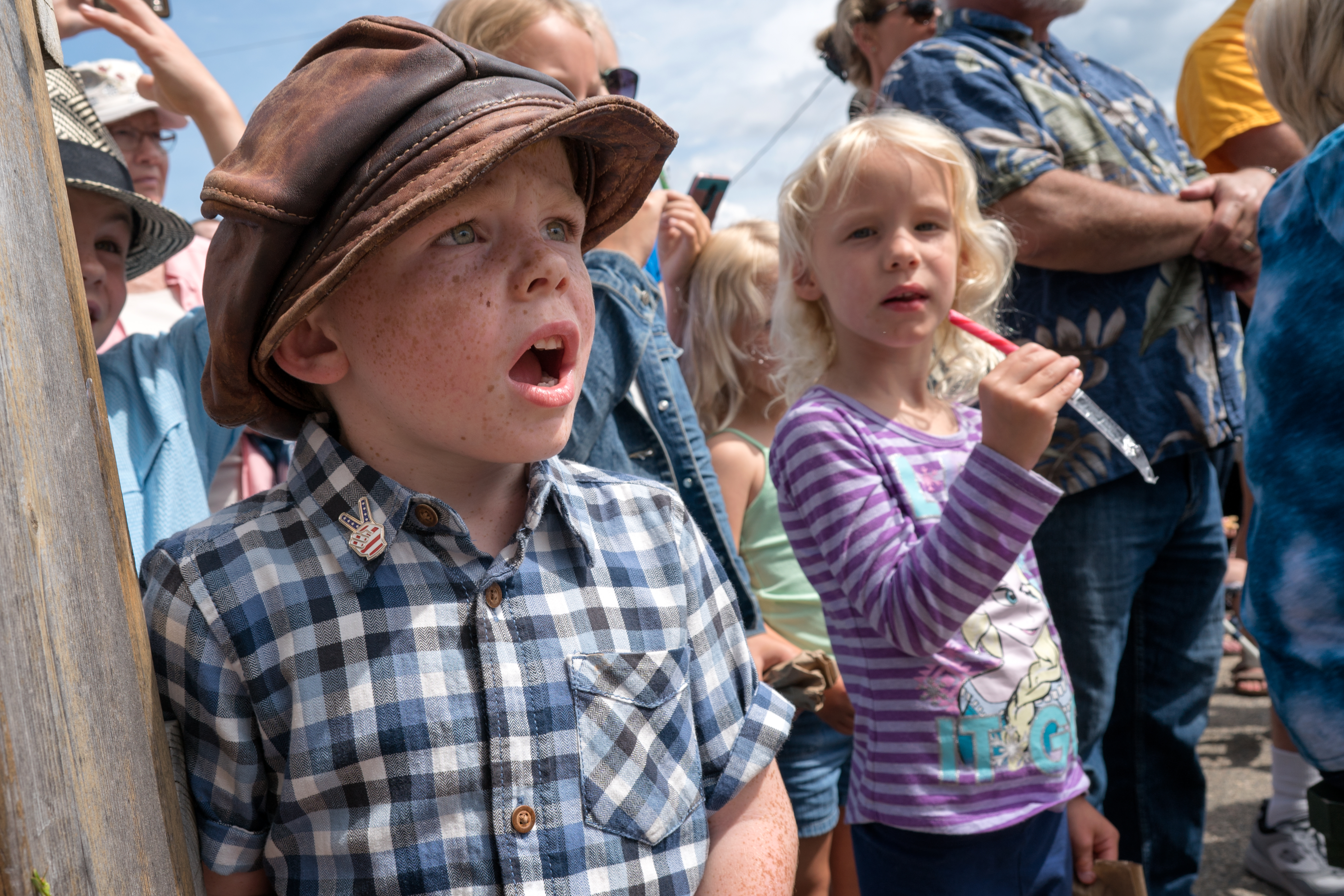
The former mayor of Dorset, James Tufts, reacts to losing a re-election bid

On the morning of September 4, 2014, a fire caused by a severe lightning storm destroyed two popular establishments, the Dorset House and Compañeros Mexican Restaurant. Both restaurants were rebuilt and reopened in May 2016.

== Mayor of Dorset ==
The position of mayor of Dorset is a symbolic one, the town being run by a group of five local business owners. The town holds a yearly election at the "Taste of Dorset" festival, residents paying one dollar to add a name of their choice to a hat, with a random slip being drawn to select a mayor.

In August 2012, then three-year-old Robert "Bobby" Tufts became mayor for a one-year term, when his name was drawn. On August 4, 2013, Tufts was elected for a second term. Tufts lost a re-election campaign in 2014 to 16-year-old Eric Mueller. Tufts's three-year-old brother, James, was also elected in August 2015. Four-year-old Gwendolyn Davis of Utah won the mayorship in 2016.

The mayor of Dorset for 2021 to 2022 was Jade Kruger of Moorhead.

The mayor in 2022 to 2023 was ten-year-old Evan Johnson of Minnetonka, Minnesota.

The mayor for the 2023 to 2024 term was golden retriever "Bear" Mohlin of Bemidji.

Another golden retriever, Waylon Lindlow, currently holds the office of the Mayor of Dorset for the 2026 to 2027 term.

== Dorset in popular culture ==
Ross Farrally, an author from the United Kingdom, published a psychological thriller/horror novel, "The Lonely Place", which is based on a fictionalised version of the town.
