= Sally Olsen (politician) =

American lawyer and politician (1934–2022)

Rosalia "Sally" Olsen
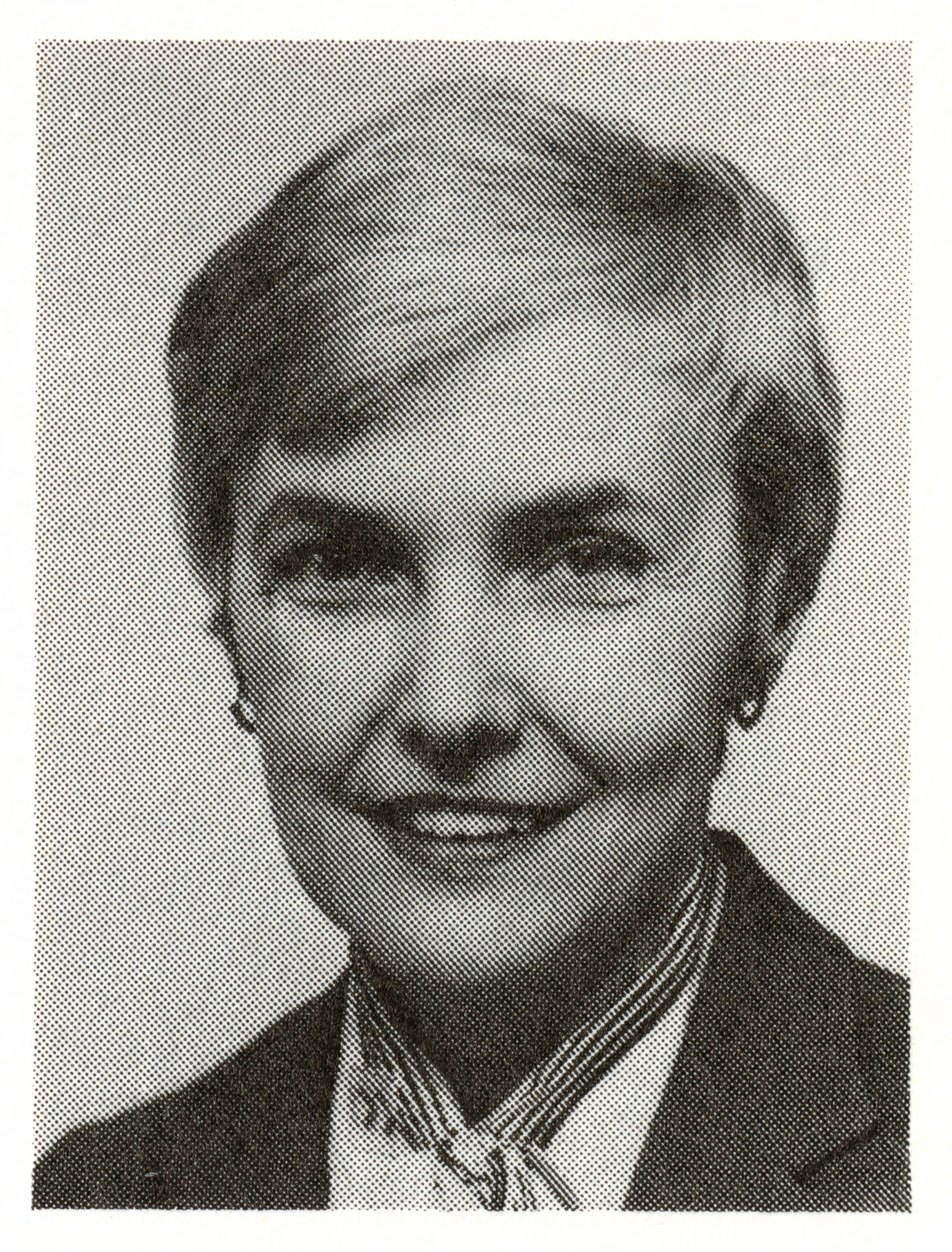

Member of the Minnesota House of Representatives
- In office January 1, 1979 – May 7, 1992
- Preceded by: John R. Arlandson
- Succeeded by: Steve Kelley
- Constituency: District 41A (1979–1983); District 44A (1983–1992)

Personal details
- Born: October 30, 1934 Saint Paul, Minnesota, U.S.
- Died: January 24, 2022 (aged 87) St. Louis Park, Minnesota, U.S.

Rosalia "Sally" Winnefred (née Van Dyke) Olsen, October 30, 1934 – January 24, 2022) was an American lawyer and politician.

Olsen was born in Saint Paul, Minnesota. She lived in St. Louis Park, Minnesota, with her husband and family, and was the office manager for the Edina Electric Company. Olsen received her bachelor's degree in business from Metropolitan State University and her Juris Doctor degree from Hamline University School of Law. She was a lawyer. Olsen served on the St. Louis Park School Board. She served in the Minnesota House of Representatives from 1979 until 1992 and was a Republican. In 1992, Olsen then served as a judge of The Minnesota Workers' Compensation Court of Appeals. Olsen died in St. Louis Park, Minnesota, on January 24, 2022, at the age of 87.
