= Minnesota State Highway 225 =

State highway in Minnesota, United States

Trunk Highway 225
- MN 225 highlighted in red

Route information
- Maintained by MnDOT
- Length: 8.809 mi (14.177 km)
- Existed: July 1, 1949–September 1, 2017

Major junctions
- West end: CSAH 26 in Ponsford
- East end: MN 34 in Osage Township

Location
- Country: United States
- State: Minnesota
- Counties: Becker

Highway system
- Minnesota Trunk Highway System; Interstate; US; State; Legislative; Scenic
← MN 223	→ MN 226

Minnesota State Highway 225 (MN 225) was a 8.809-mile-long (14.177 km) highway in north-central Minnesota, which ran from its intersection with County State-Aid Highway 26 and County Road 129 in the town of Ponsford south and east to its intersection with State Highway 34 in Osage Township of Becker County.

The route was 8.8 miles (14.2 km) in length and passed through the communities of Ponsford, Carsonville Township, and Osage Township. It was removed as a state highway in 2017, and became a county road.

== Route description ==
Highway 225 began in the unincorporated town of Ponsford, at an intersection with County State-Aid Highway 26 (CSAH 26) and County Road 129 (CR 129). It passed by the Carsonville Township town and fire hall before leaving the settlement and traveling amongst farm fields. The roadway curved to the south for a half mile before curving back east, following a section line; the roadway would thenceforth follow section lines for the remainder of its length. After one mile, the road turned southward again at its junction with CR 156 (north) and 270th Street (east). Another mile later, the road turned eastward again, with Guyles Road continuing south and Smokey Hills Road traveling to the west. Two miles afterward, the road turned south yet again at an intersection with Straight Lake Road heading north, and Eagle Bay Avenue heading east to Straight Lake. Another mile south, the highway turned east for the final time and then a mile subsequently reached the junction where it made its final turn south, connecting with Park Trail going north and Washington Drive continuing east. It traveled for one more mile before reaching its terminus at State Highway 34.

The route was legally defined as Route 225 in the Minnesota Statutes.

== History ==
Highway 225 was authorized on July 1, 1949. The route was paved at the time it was marked.

It had been part of the original routing of State Highway 34 until it was realigned in 1941.

The highway was removed from statute during the state Legislature's 2017 special session, and turned over to Becker County maintenance on September 1, 2017, becoming CSAH 26. MnDOT provided $9.5 million to the county for future improvements as part of the ownership transfer.

== Major intersections ==
The entire route is in Becker County.

Location	mi	km	Destinations	Notes
Ponsford	0.000	0.000	CSAH 26 west / CR 129 north	Western terminus of MN 225; eastern terminus of CSAH 26; southern terminus of CR 129
Carsonville Township	0.996	1.603	CSAH 44 north	Southern terminus of CSAH 44
Carsonville Township	2.945	4.740	CR 156 north	Southern terminus of CR 156
Osage Township	8.809	14.177	MN 34 / CSAH 47 south	Eastern terminus of MN 225; northern terminus of CSAH 47
1.000 mi = 1.609 km; 1.000 km = 0.621 mi
