= Kris Hasskamp =

American politician

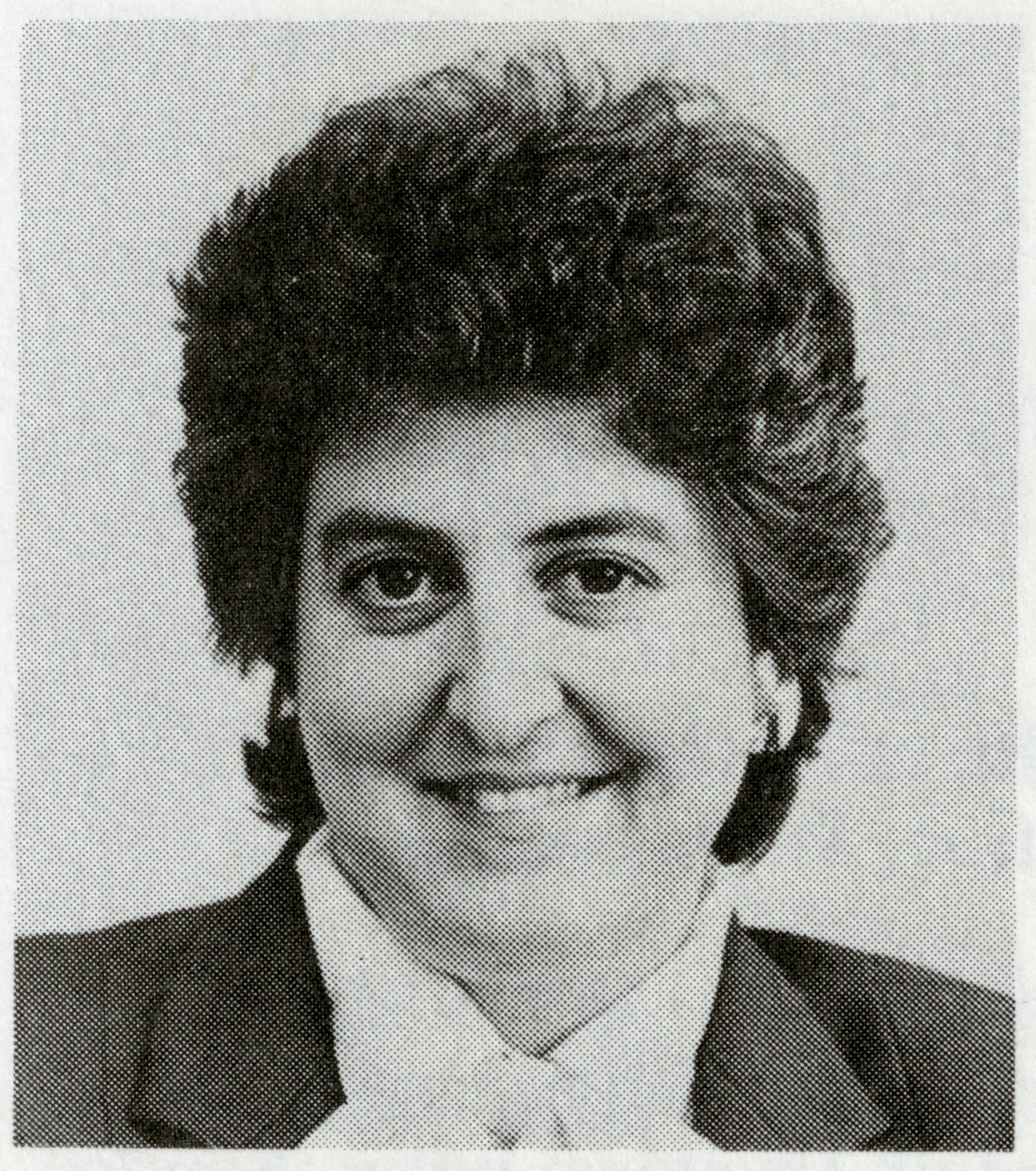

Member of the Minnesota House of Representatives from district 12A
- In office January 5, 1993 – January 2, 2001
- Preceded by: Syd Nelson
- Succeeded by: Dale Walz

Member of the Minnesota House of Representatives from district 13A
- In office January 3, 1989 – January 4, 1993
- Preceded by: Paul M. Thiede
- Succeeded by: Chuck Brown

Personal details
- Born: April 27, 1951 (age 75) Crosby, Minnesota, U.S.
- Party: Democratic

Kris Hasskamp (born April 27, 1951) is an American politician.

Hasskamp was born in Crosby, Minnesota. She went to the College of St. Scholastica and received her associate degree from Brainerd Community College. Hasskamp received her bachelor's degree, in health and physical education, from Bemidji State University. Hasskamp was an administrator and educator. Hasskamp served in the Minnesota House of Representatives from 1989 to 2001 and was a Democrat.
