= Glacial till plains (Ohio) =

Landform in Ohio, United States

The Glacial till plains are a till plain landform in Northern Ohio, located near the shore of Lake Erie and produced by the retreat of the Wisconsin glaciation. Since glacial till is highly fertile soil, agriculture on the glacial till plains is very productive.

The region has gently rolling moraine hills left over from the retreating glaciers, as well as small sandy ridges, which were formed as coastal dunes during periods in which Lake Erie was higher than it is today (14,000-12,000 years ago).It is known to be useful in farming.
