= Duane Benson =

American football player and politician (1945–2019)

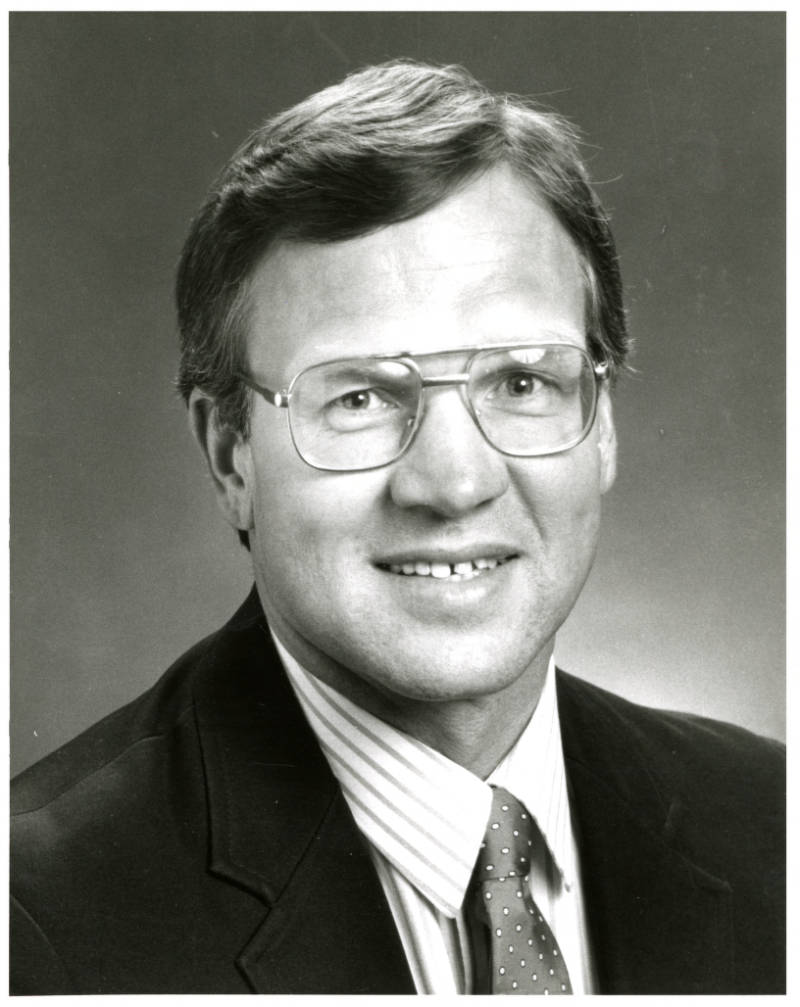
- Portrait of Benson from 1991

No. 50, 51, 52
- Position: Linebacker

Personal information
- Born: August 5, 1945; Belmond, Iowa, U.S.
- Died: January 26, 2019 (aged 73); Rochester, Minnesota, U.S.
- Listed height: 6 ft 2 in (1.88 m)
- Listed weight: 215 lb (98 kg)

Career information
- High school: Grand Meadow (MN)
- College: Hamline
- NFL draft: 1967: 11th round, 280th overall pick

Career history
- Oakland Raiders (1967-1971); Atlanta Falcons (1972–1973); Houston Oilers (1974–1976)

Awards and highlights
- AFL champion (1967)

Career NFL/AFL statistics
- Interceptions: 3
- Fumble recoveries: 3
- Sacks: 5.5
- Stats at Pro Football Reference

Dean Duane Benson (August 5, 1945 – January 26, 2019) was an American professional football linebacker and politician.

== Football career ==
Benson played college football and track and field at Hamline University. Benson graduated from Hamline University in 1967. He played professionally in American Football League for the Oakland Raiders (1967–1969) and in the National Football League for the Raiders (1970–1971), the Atlanta Falcons (1972–1973), and the Houston Oilers (1974–1976).

== Business and political career ==
Benson was a charter member of the Minnesota Sports Facilities Authority, created in 2012 to oversee construction of the state's new professional football stadium. He was the executive director of the Minnesota Business Partnership from 1994 to 2003. Benson owned and operated a cattle farm outside of Lanesboro, Minnesota.

Benson served in the Minnesota Senate, as a Republican, from 1980 to 1994 and was the Senate Minority Leader for six years.

Benson was founding co-director of the Minnesota Early Learning Foundation which brought together civic and business leaders to raise $20 million which was invested between 2006 and 2011 in support of finding approaches to ensure all Minnesota children enter kindergarten ready to learn. The group went on to recommend the creation of Minnesota's Early Learning Scholarship program, which has helped tens of thousands of children in low-income families to access quality early care and education.

== Death ==
Benson died from cancer, on January 26, 2019, at the Methodist Hospital-Mayo Clinic, in Rochester, Minnesota. He was 73.

== See also ==
- List of American Football League players
