= Syd Nelson =

American politician (1932–2021)

Member of the Minnesota House of Representatives from the 11A district
- In office 1993–1994

Member of the Minnesota House of Representatives from the 12A district
- In office 1991–1992

Personal details
- Born: December 9, 1932 Paddock Township, Otter Tail County, Minnesota
- Died: July 10, 2021 (aged 88) Sebeka, Minnesota
- Party: Minnesota Democratic–Farmer–Labor Party
- Spouse: Kathryn Louise Johnson
- Children: three
- Education: Moorhead State University, St. Cloud State University
- Occupation: Farmer

Sydney George Nelson (December 9, 1932 – July 10, 2021) was an American politician in the state of Minnesota. He served in the Minnesota House of Representatives from 1991 to 1992 and from 1993 to 1994. He was previously a Wadena County, Minnesota county commissioner, serving from 1986 to 1991.
