= Jeffrey O. Hanson =

American politician (1958–2006)

Member of the Minnesota House of Representatives from the 56A district
- In office January 8, 1991 – January 4, 1993

Personal details
- Born: Jeffrey Orlis Hanson; February 9, 1958 Milwaukee, Wisconsin, U.S.
- Died: November 17, 2006 (aged 48) Woodbury, Minnesota, U.S.
- Party: Democratic
- Spouse: Robin Rudolph (m. 1982, divorced)
- Children: 1
- Education: Moorhead State University (BA); University of Minnesota
- Profession: Politician

Jeffrey Orlis "Jeff" Hanson (February 9, 1958 – November 17, 2006) was an American politician.

== Early life and education ==
Born in Milwaukee, Hanson received his bachelor's degree in mass communication from Moorhead State University and his master's degree from the University of Minnesota.

== Career ==
He lived in Woodbury, Minnesota and was the Washington County, Minnesota Public Information Officer. From 1991 to 1993, Hanson served in the Minnesota House of Representatives and was a Democrat. Hanson then served as executor director of the Minnesota Utility Contractors Association from 1994 until his death. Hanson died of Creutzfeldt–Jakob disease in a hospital in Woodbury, Minnesota.
