= Toad Lake Township, Becker County, Minnesota =

Toad Lake Township, Minnesota
- Township
- Location of Toad Lake Township, within Becker County, Minnesota

- Location within the state of Minnesota Toad Lake Township, Minnesota (the United States)
- Coordinates: 46°51′0″N 95°28′59″W
- Country: United States
- State: Minnesota
- County: Becker

Area
  - Total: 36.3 sq mi (94.0 km^{2})
  - Land: 32.6 sq mi (84.4 km^{2})
  - Water: 3.7 sq mi (9.6 km^{2})
- Elevation: 1,540 ft (470 m)

Population (2020)
  - Total: 496
  - Density: 15.2/sq mi (5.88/km^{2})
- Time zone: UTC-6 (Central (CST))
  - Summer (DST): UTC-5 (CDT)
- FIPS code: 27-65002
- GNIS feature ID: 0665792

Toad Lake Township is a township in Becker County, Minnesota, United States. The population was 496 as of the 2020 census.

== History ==
Toad Lake Township was organized in 1892. It took its name from Toad Lake.

== Geography ==
According to the United States Census Bureau, the township has a total area of 36.3 square miles (94.0 km^{2}), of which 32.6 square miles (84.4 km^{2}) is land and 3.7 square miles (9.6 km^{2}) (10.22%) is water.

=== Major highways ===
- Minnesota State Highway 34

=== Lakes ===
- Goose Lake
- Mud Lake
- S Twin Lake (east edge)
- Sieverson Lake
- Sock Lake
- Toad Lake
- Wolf Lake (west edge)

=== Adjacent townships ===
- Shell Lake Township (north)
- Carsonville Township (northeast)
- Wolf Lake Township (east)
- Spruce Grove Township (southeast)
- Evergreen Township (south)
- Silver Leaf Township (southwest)
- Height of Land Township (west)

=== Cemeteries ===
The township contains two cemeteries, Snellman and Zion Lutheran.

== Demographics ==
As of the census of 2000, there were 465 people, 180 households, and 138 families residing in the township. The population density was 14.3 people per square mile (5.5/km^{2}). There were 276 housing units at an average density of 8.5/sq mi (3.3/km^{2}). The racial makeup of the township was 98.06% White, 0.22% African American, 0.65% Native American, 0.65% Asian, and 0.43% from two or more races. Hispanic or Latino of any race were 0.22% of the population.

There were 180 households, out of which 25.0% had children under the age of 18 living with them, 69.4% were married couples living together, 5.0% had a female householder with no husband present, and 22.8% were non-families. 16.7% of all households were made up of individuals, and 7.8% had someone living alone who was 65 years of age or older. The average household size was 2.58 and the average family size was 2.91.

In the township the population was spread out, with 24.7% under the age of 18, 5.2% from 18 to 24, 22.4% from 25 to 44, 30.3% from 45 to 64, and 17.4% who were 65 years of age or older. The median age was 43 years. For every 100 females, there were 112.3 males. For every 100 females age 18 and over, there were 113.4 males.

The median income for a household in the township was $35,703, and the median income for a family was $36,932. Males had a median income of $23,125 versus $17,708 for females. The per capita income for the township was $13,315. About 9.1% of families and 15.1% of the population were below the poverty line, including 28.3% of those under age 18 and 9.0% of those age 65 or over.
