= Straight River (central Minnesota) =

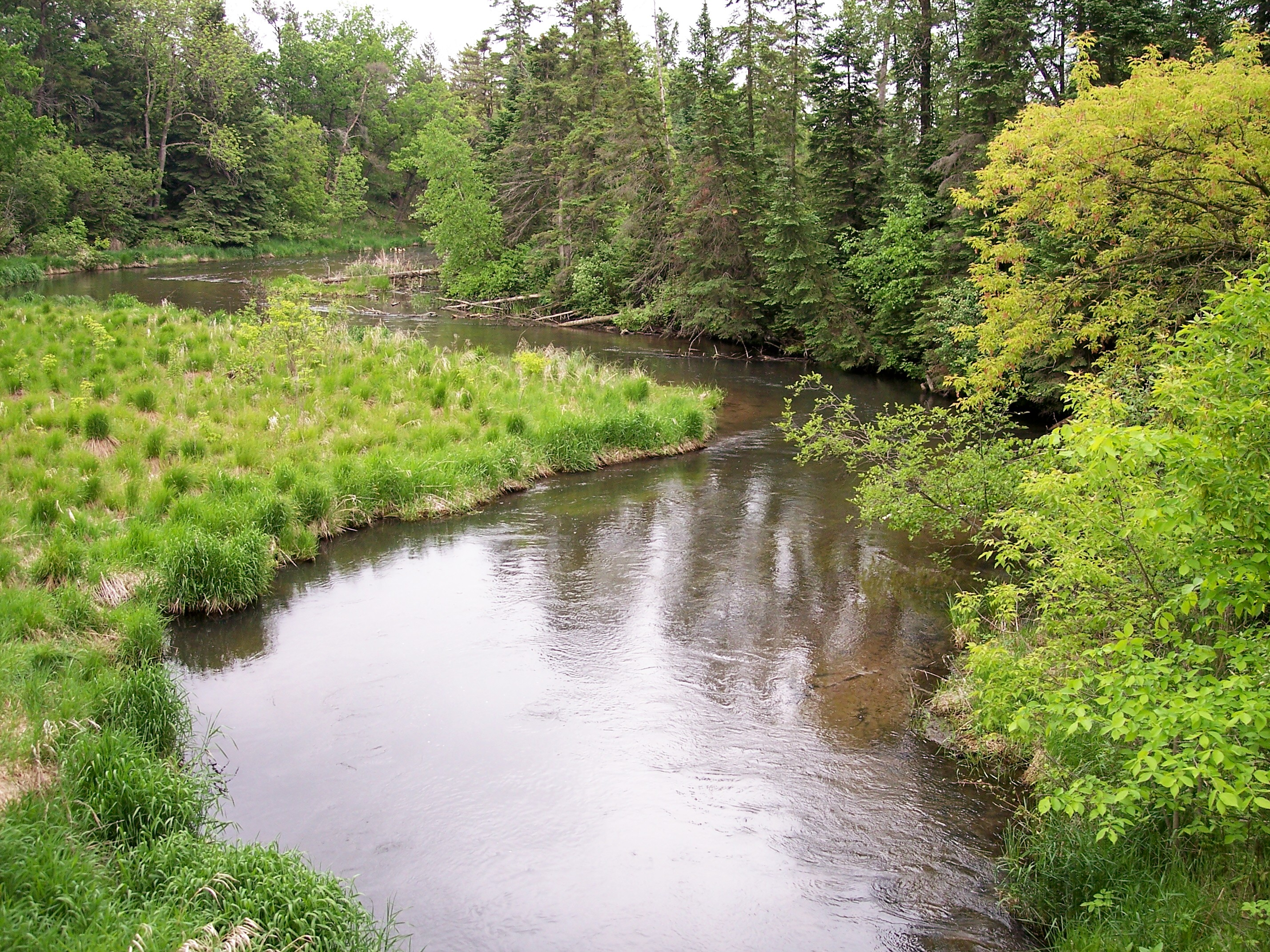
- The Straight River in Straight River Township in 2007

- Location of the mouth of the Straight River

Location
- Country: United States
- State: Minnesota
- Counties: Becker County, Hubbard County

Physical characteristics
- Source
  - location: Pine Point Township, Becker County
  - coordinates: 47°00′08″N 95°18′34″W
  - elevation: 1,506 ft (459 m)
- Mouth: Fish Hook River
  - location: Hubbard Township, Hubbard County
  - coordinates: 46°52′08″N 95°01′55″W
  - elevation: 1,384 ft (422 m)
- Length: 22.7 mi (36.5 km)
- Basin size: 60 mi^{2} (160 km^{2})approx.
- Discharge
  - location: near Park Rapids
  - average: 60.8 cu ft/s (1.72 m^{3}/s)
  - minimum: 21 cu ft/s (0.59 m^{3}/s)
  - maximum: 149 cu ft/s (4.2 m^{3}/s)

The Straight River is a tributary of the Fish Hook River, 23 miles (37 km) long, in the north-central region of the U.S. state of Minnesota. Via the Fish Hook, Shell, and Crow Wing Rivers, it is part of the watershed of the Mississippi River, draining an area of approximately 60 square miles (160 km^{2}) in a rural region. The river is known as one of Minnesota's best trout fishing streams.

The river's name is a translation of the Ojibwe name for Straight Lake, through which the river flows near its source.

== Geography ==
The Straight River rises in the White Earth Indian Reservation and Two Inlets State Forest, approximately 6 miles (9.7 km) northeast of Pine Point in Pine Point Township in northeastern Becker County. It flows initially southeastwardly, passing through Straight Lake, then east-southeastwardly into southwestern Hubbard County. It flows into the Fish Hook River in Hubbard Township, approximately 4 miles (6.4 km) south of Park Rapids. The river flows in the Northern Lakes and Forests ecoregion, which is characterized by conifer and hardwood forests on flat and rolling till plains and outwash plains.

The Straight River is fed by springs which provide water cold enough to support an abundant trout population, and is known in sport fishing for catches of brown trout exceeding 20 inches (51 cm) in length. The river formerly supported a population of brook trout which declined due to rising water temperatures. In the early 1990s a group of organizations including Trout Unlimited sued the Minnesota Department of Natural Resources, seeking heightened protection of the Straight River; the department has since begun scrutinizing the irrigation activities of agricultural operations in the river's watershed, which may threaten the springs feeding cold water to the river.

== Flow rate ==
At the United States Geological Survey's stream gauge in Straight River Township near Park Rapids, the annual mean flow of the river between 1987 and 2005 was 60.8 cubic feet (1.72 m^{3}) per second. The highest recorded flow during the period was 149 cubic feet (4.2 m^{3}) per second on April 6, 1997. The lowest recorded flow was 21 cubic feet (0.59 m^{3}) per second on November 23, 2003.

== See also ==
- List of rivers in Minnesota
