= Hubbard Lake (disambiguation) =

Hubbard Lake is a large inland lake in northern Alcona County, Michigan, United States

Hubbard Lake may also refer to:

- Hubbard Lake, Alcona County, Michigan, a census-designated place encompassing the area immediately surrounding the Hubbard Lake in Alcona County
- Hubbard Lake, Alpena County, Michigan, a small, unincorporated community about a mile north of Lake Hubbard in Alpena County

== See also ==
- Lake Ray Hubbard, a reservoir located near Dallas, Texas, United States
- Hubbard (disambiguation)
