= Carsonville Township, Becker County, Minnesota =

Carsonville Township, Minnesota
- Township
- Location of Carsonville Township, within Becker County, Minnesota

- Location within the state of Minnesota Carsonville Township, Minnesota (the United States)
- Coordinates: 46°56′33″N 95°21′6″W
- Country: United States
- State: Minnesota
- County: Becker

Area
  - Total: 35.8 sq mi (92.7 km^{2})
  - Land: 35.1 sq mi (90.8 km^{2})
  - Water: 0.73 sq mi (1.9 km^{2})
- Elevation: 1,570 ft (480 m)

Population (2020)
  - Total: 213
  - Density: 6.08/sq mi (2.35/km^{2})
- Time zone: UTC-6 (Central (CST))
  - Summer (DST): UTC-5 (CDT)
- FIPS code: 27-10126
- GNIS feature ID: 0663758

Carsonville Township is a township in Becker County, Minnesota, United States. The population was 213 as of the 2020 census.

== History ==
Carsonville Township was organized in 1881. It was named for George M. Carson, a settler who arrived in 1879.

== Geography ==
According to the United States Census Bureau, the township has a total area of 35.8 square miles (93 km^{2}), of which 35.1 square miles (91 km^{2}) is land and 0.7 square miles (1.8 km^{2}) (2.04%) is water. The Shell River flows eastwardly through the township from its source in Shell Lake in the northwestern part of the township.

=== Major highway ===
- Minnesota State Highway 34

=== Lakes ===
- Bottomless Lake
- Cranberry Lake
- Elbow Lake
- Guyles Lake
- Linbom Lake
- Mud Lake
- Shell Lake (east edge)

=== Adjacent townships ===
- Pine Point Township (north)
- Two Inlets Township (northeast)
- Osage Township (east)
- Green Valley Township (southeast)
- Wolf Lake Township (south)
- Toad Lake Township (southwest)
- Shell Lake Township (west)

=== Cemeteries ===
The township contains these two cemeteries: Linnel and Saint Paul's Lutheran.

== Demographics ==
As of the census of 2000, there were 252 people, 99 households, and 69 families residing in the township. The population density was 7.2 inhabitants per square mile (2.8/km^{2}). There were 120 housing units at an average density of 3.4 per square mile (1.3/km^{2}). The racial makeup of the township was 83.33% White, 14.68% Native American, and 1.98% from two or more races. Hispanic or Latino of any race were 1.19% of the population.

There were 99 households, out of which 34.3% had children under the age of 18 living with them, 56.6% were married couples living together, 11.1% had a female householder with no husband present, and 29.3% were non-families. 26.3% of all households were made up of individuals, and 11.1% had someone living alone who was 65 years of age or older. The average household size was 2.55 and the average family size was 3.04.

In the township the population was spread out, with 29.0% under the age of 18, 4.0% from 18 to 24, 27.8% from 25 to 44, 24.6% from 45 to 64, and 14.7% who were 65 years of age or older. The median age was 39 years. For every 100 females, there were 101.6 males. For every 100 females age 18 and over, there were 108.1 males.

The median income for a household in the township was $35,000, and the median income for a family was $37,000. Males had a median income of $27,188 versus $20,208 for females. The per capita income for the township was $15,768. About 9.1% of families and 10.7% of the population were below the poverty line, including 10.0% of those under the age of eighteen and 3.8% of those 65 or over.
