= Snellman, Minnesota =

Unincorporated community in Minnesota, US

Snellman
- Unincorporated community
- Location within Minnesota Location within the United States
- Coordinates: 46°53′22″N 95°24′47″W
- Country: United States
- State: Minnesota
- County: Becker
- Elevation: 1,591 ft (485 m)
- Time zone: UTC-6 (Central (CST))
  - Summer (DST): UTC-5 (CDT)
- Area code: 218
- GNIS feature ID: 652203

Snellman is an unincorporated community in Becker County, Minnesota, United States.

The community is located between Detroit Lakes and Park Rapids on Minnesota State Highway 34.
