= Osage, Minnesota =

Unincorporated community in Minnesota, US

Osage
- Census-designated place
- Location within Minnesota
- Coordinates: 46°55′13″N 95°15′25″W
- Country: United States
- State: Minnesota
- County: Becker

Area
  - Total: 3.17 sq mi (8.20 km^{2})
  - Land: 2.73 sq mi (7.06 km^{2})
  - Water: 0.44 sq mi (1.14 km^{2})
- Elevation: 1,493 ft (455 m)

Population (2020)
  - Total: 282
  - Density: 103.4/sq mi (39.92/km^{2})
- Time zone: UTC-6 (Central (CST))
  - Summer (DST): UTC-5 (CDT)
- Area code: 218
- GNIS feature ID: 649009

Osage is a census-designated place and unincorporated community in Osage Township, Becker County, Minnesota, United States. As of the 2020 census, Osage had a population of 282.

== Demographics ==
Historical population
Census	Pop.	Note	%±
2020	282		—
U.S. Decennial Census
