= Ponsford, Minnesota =

Unincorporated community in Minnesota, US

Ponsford Nenzhigwaakokaang (Ojibwe)
- Unincorporated community
- Location within Minnesota Location within the United States
- Coordinates: 46°58′12″N 95°23′01″W
- Country: United States
- State: Minnesota
- County: Becker
- Elevation: 1,535 ft (468 m)
- Time zone: UTC-6 (Central (CST))
  - Summer (DST): UTC-5 (CDT)
- ZIP Code: 56575
- Area code: 218
- GNIS feature ID: 649629

Ponsford (/ˈpɒnsfərd/ PONSS-fərd) is an unincorporated community in Becker County, Minnesota, United States. It is west of Park Rapids on former Minnesota State Highway 225.

Minnesota State Highway 34 is nearby.
