= Hubard =

Hubard is a surname. Notable people with the surname include:

- Edmund W. Hubard (1806–1878), American politician and appraiser
- William James Hubard (1807–1862), British artist

== See also ==
- Isabel Hubard Escalera, Mexican mathematician
- Hubbard (disambiguation)
