= Paul Hufnagle =

American businessman and politician

Member of the Minnesota House of Representatives from the 41A district
- In office 8 January 1991 – 4 January 1993
- Preceded by: Alice Seagren
- Succeeded by: John Himle

Personal details
- Born: January 1936
- Died: October 11, 2017 (aged 81)
- Party: Republican
- Spouse: Phyllis Hufnagle
- Children: 5

Paul C. Hufnagle (January 1936 – October 11, 2017) was an American businessman and politician and former member of the Minnesota House of Representatives from the 41A district.

Hufnagle was born in Cleveland, Ohio. In 1937, Hufnagle and his family moved to Minneapolis, Minnesota. He graduated from DeLaSalle High School in Minneapolis, and then went to the University of St. Thomas. In 1957, Hufnagle received his bachelor's degree in economics from University of Minnesota and went to graduate school at University of Minnesota. He lived in Bloomington, Minnesota and was a banker. Hufnagle served in the Minnesota House of Representatives and was a Republican. Hufnagle died in Bloomington, Minnesota.
