= Crow Wing Lake Township, Hubbard County, Minnesota =

Crow Wing Lake Township, Minnesota
- Township
- Location of Crow Wing Lake Township, within Hubbard County, Minnesota
- Coordinates: 46°50′59″N 94°52′12″W
- Country: United States
- State: Minnesota
- County: Hubbard

Area
  - Total: 35.3 sq mi (91.4 km^{2})
  - Land: 29.5 sq mi (76.3 km^{2})
  - Water: 5.8 sq mi (15.1 km^{2})
- Elevation: 1,381 ft (421 m)

Population (2020)
  - Total: 358
  - Density: 12.2/sq mi (4.69/km^{2})
- Time zone: UTC-6 (Central (CST))
  - Summer (DST): UTC-5 (CDT)
- FIPS code: 27-14140
- GNIS feature ID: 0663901
- Website: http://www.crowwinglaketownship.com/

Crow Wing Lake Township is a township in Hubbard County, Minnesota, United States. The population was 358 at the 2020 census.

Crow Wing Lake Township was so named on account of there being many lakes near the Crow Wing River within its borders.

== Geography ==
According to the United States Census Bureau, the township has a total area of 35.3 square miles (91 km^{2}), of which 29.5 square miles (76 km^{2}) is land and 5.8 square miles (15 km^{2}) (16.52%) is water.

== Demographics ==
As of the census of 2000, there were 266 people, 122 households, and 89 families residing in the township. The population density was 9.0 inhabitants per square mile (3.5/km^{2}). There were 544 housing units at an average density of 18.5 per square mile (7.1/km^{2}). The racial makeup of the township was 97.74% White, 0.75% Native American, and 1.50% from two or more races. Hispanic or Latino of any race were 1.13% of the population.

There were 122 households, out of which 15.6% had children under the age of 18 living with them, 63.9% were married couples living together, 5.7% had a female householder with no husband present, and 27.0% were non-families. 22.1% of all households were made up of individuals, and 9.8% had someone living alone who was 65 years of age or older. The average household size was 2.18 and the average family size was 2.53.

In the township the population was spread out, with 15.8% under the age of 18, 5.3% from 18 to 24, 16.5% from 25 to 44, 32.7% from 45 to 64, and 29.7% who were 65 years of age or older. The median age was 54 years. For every 100 females, there were 114.5 males. For every 100 females age 18 and over, there were 113.3 males.

The median income for a household in the township was $41,875, and the median income for a family was $44,250. Males had a median income of $29,375 versus $24,583 for females. The per capita income for the township was $21,673. About 4.1% of families and 7.1% of the population were below the poverty line, including 16.7% of those under the age of eighteen and none of those 65 or over.
