= Minnesota State Highway 34 =

State highway in Minnesota, United States

Trunk Highway 34
- MN 34 highlighted in red

Route information
- Maintained by MnDOT
- Length: 103.163 mi (166.025 km)
- Existed: 1920–present

Major junctions
- West end: MN 9 / CR 2 at Barnesville
- I-94 / US 52 at Barnesville; MN 32 near Barnesville; US 10 / US 59 at Detroit Lakes; US 71 at Park Rapids; MN 64 at Akeley
- East end: MN 200 / MN 371 at Walker

Location
- Country: United States
- State: Minnesota
- Counties: Clay, Otter Tail, Becker, Hubbard, Cass

Highway system
- Minnesota Trunk Highway System; Interstate; US; State; Legislative; Scenic
← MN 33	→ I-35

Minnesota State Highway 34 (MN 34) is a 103.163-mile-long (166.025 km) highway in west-central and north-central Minnesota, which runs from its intersection with State Highway 9 (near Interstate 94/US Highway 52) in Barnesville and continues east to its eastern terminus at its intersection with State Highways 200 and 371 in Walker.

The route is concurrent with U.S. Highway 59 for 16.6 miles (26.7 km) in Otter Tail and Becker counties near Detroit Lakes.

== Route description ==
State Highway 34 serves as an east–west route between Barnesville, Detroit Lakes, Park Rapids, and Walker in west-central and north-central Minnesota.

Highway 34 passes through the Smoky Hills State Forest in Becker County between Detroit Lakes and Park Rapids.

The route passes through the Chippewa National Forest in Cass County between Akeley and Walker. The western terminus for Highway 34 is its intersection with State Highway 9 in Barnesville, one mile from Interstate 94/US Highway 52.

== History ==
State Highway 34 was established November 2, 1920. At this time, it ran from State Highway 2 (present-day U.S. 10) in Detroit Lakes to State Highway 8 (present-day U.S. 2) in Cohasset, west of Grand Rapids.

By 1923, the road was graveled from Park Rapids to Walker and on a short section west of Cohasset; the remainder was unimproved. The entirety of the highway was graveled by 1930.

The roadway was paved through most of Hubbard County in 1932.

In 1933, the route was extended west, from Detroit Lakes to U.S. Route 52 and Minnesota State Highway 82 in Barnesville; it was rerouted on its east end, continuing eastward from Remer to U.S. 2 between Swan River and Floodwood. State Highway 6 replaced it north of Remer. The only paved portion of the highway extensions was the concurrency with then-State Highway 73 (now U.S. 59) from Dunvilla to Detroit Lakes.

It was paved from Osage to the Becker-Hubbard county line in 1938 and from Osage to Ponsford in 1940. Paving was also done in 1938 west of Remer, and the remaining portion westward to Highway 87 in 1947.

In 1941, the highway was realigned through Becker County. It now took a more direct route to Osage through Snellman, instead of traveling northward along the shore of Shell Lake, east through Ponsford, and southeast to Osage; the portion of this former routing from Ponsford eastward became State Highway 225 in 1949. The segment between the new alignment and Detroit Lakes was paved that year, and the realigned section was paved in 1946. The remaining portion from Highway 371 to Remer was paved in 1947, and the paving from Remer to Hill City was completed in 1950. The section of roadway between Barnesville and Dunvilla was paved in stages in the early 1950s: several miles east of Barnesville in 1951, from the Clay-Otter Tail county line to U.S. 59 in 1952, and the remainder in 1954.

From Hill City to the Mississippi River near Jacobson was paved in 1957 and the remaining segment from Jacobson to U.S. 2 the following year; this completed the paving of the highway.

In 1969, the portion of Highway 34 from U.S. 371 near Walker to U.S. 2 was renumbered as part of the newly-marked State Highway 200.

In 2008, Highway 34 was expanded to a five-lane route through Park Rapids on its surface street alignment.

== Major intersections ==
County	Location	mi	km	Destinations	Notes
Clay	Barnesville	0.000	0.000	MN 9 – Moorhead, Breckenridge	
Clay	Humboldt Township	1.099– 1.285	1.769– 2.068	I-94 / US 52 – Fergus Falls, Moorhead	Interchange; I-94 Exit 24
Clay	Tansem Township	8.770	14.114	MN 32 north – Rollag	Southern terminus of MN 32
Otter Tail	Dunn Township	18.862	30.355	US 59 south – Pelican Rapids, Fergus Falls	Southern end of US 59 concurrency
Becker	Detroit Lakes	35.230	56.697	US 10 – Wadena, Moorhead	
Becker	Detroit Lakes	35.515	57.156	US 59 north – Mahnomen	Northern end of US 59 concurrency
Becker	Osage Township	65.011	104.625	CSAH 26 west – Ponsford	Former MN 225
Hubbard	Park Rapids	74.963	120.641	US 71 – Menahga, Wadena, Bemidji	
Hubbard	Henrietta Township	80.172	129.024	MN 226 north – Dorset	Southern terminus of MN 226
Hubbard	Akeley	92.891	149.494	MN 64 south – Motley	Western end of MN 64 concurrency
Hubbard	Akeley	93.494	150.464	MN 64 north – Bemidji	Eastern end of MN 64 concurrency
Cass	Walker	103.170	166.036	MN 200 / MN 371 – Remer, Brainerd, Cass Lake	
1.000 mi = 1.609 km; 1.000 km = 0.621 mi: Concurrency terminus
