= Toad Lake (Washington) =

- Emerald Lake
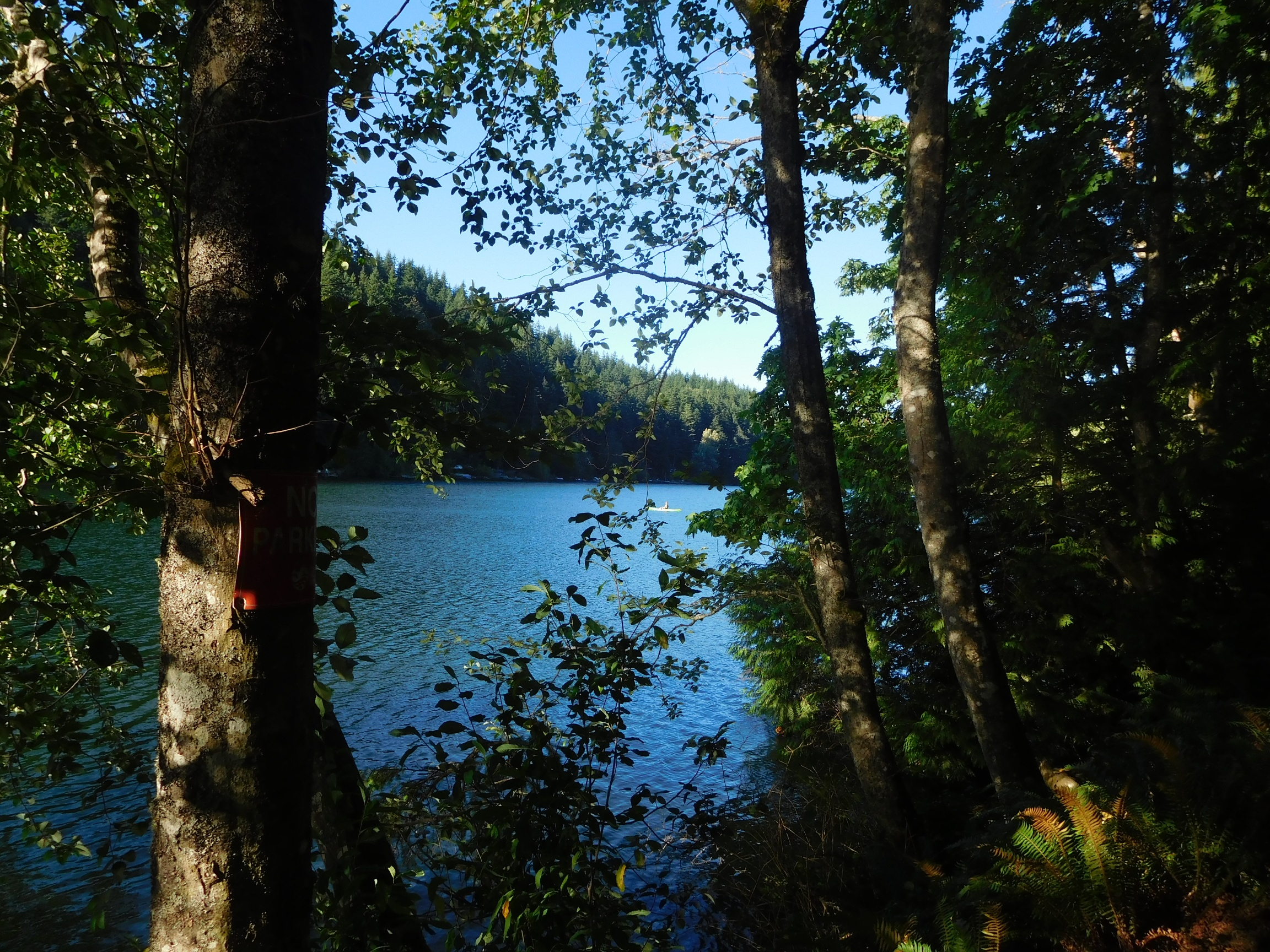
- Toad Lake in July 2017

- Location within Washington (state)
- Location: Whatcom County, Washington
- Coordinates: 48°47′28″N 122°23′42″W
- Type: lake
- Basin countries: United States
- Surface area: 30 acres (12 ha)
- Surface elevation: 719 ft (219 m)

Toad Lake is a lake near the city of Bellingham in the U.S. state of Washington.

Toad Lake was named for the fact that the lake was the habitat of an abundance of toads.

== See also ==
- List of lakes in Washington
