= Wolf Lake (Becker County, Minnesota) =

Lake in the state of Minnesota, United States

- Location within Minnesota
- Location: Becker County, Minnesota
- Coordinates: 46°49′28″N 95°22′55″W
- Type: lake

Wolf Lake is a lake in Becker County, Minnesota, in the United States.

Wolf Lake was so named from the fact it was once a hunting ground of wolves and other animals.

== See also ==
- List of lakes in Minnesota
