= Minnesota Workers' Compensation Court of Appeals =

The Minnesota Workers' Compensation Court of Appeals (WCCA) is an independent agency of the Minnesota State executive branch. It was created by Minn. Chap. 175A. The WCCA consists of four judges and one chief judge. Each judge is appointed for a six-year term by the governor. Positions are confirmed by the Minnesota Senate.

== Judges ==
The sitting judges include:

- Chief Judge Patricia J. Milun (2011)
- Judge Deborah K. Sundquist (2015)
- Judge Sean M. Quinn (2018)
- Judge Thomas J. Christenson (2022)
- Judge Kathryn H. Carlson (2023)
