= Toad Lake (Minnesota) =

Lake in the state of Minnesota, United States

- Location within Minnesota
- Location: Toad Lake Township, Becker County, Minnesota
- Coordinates: 46°51′56″N 95°29′26″W
- Type: lake

Toad Lake is a lake in Toad Lake Township, Becker County, Minnesota, in the United States.

Toad Lake is the English translation of the Native American name.
