= Blueberry River (Minnesota) =

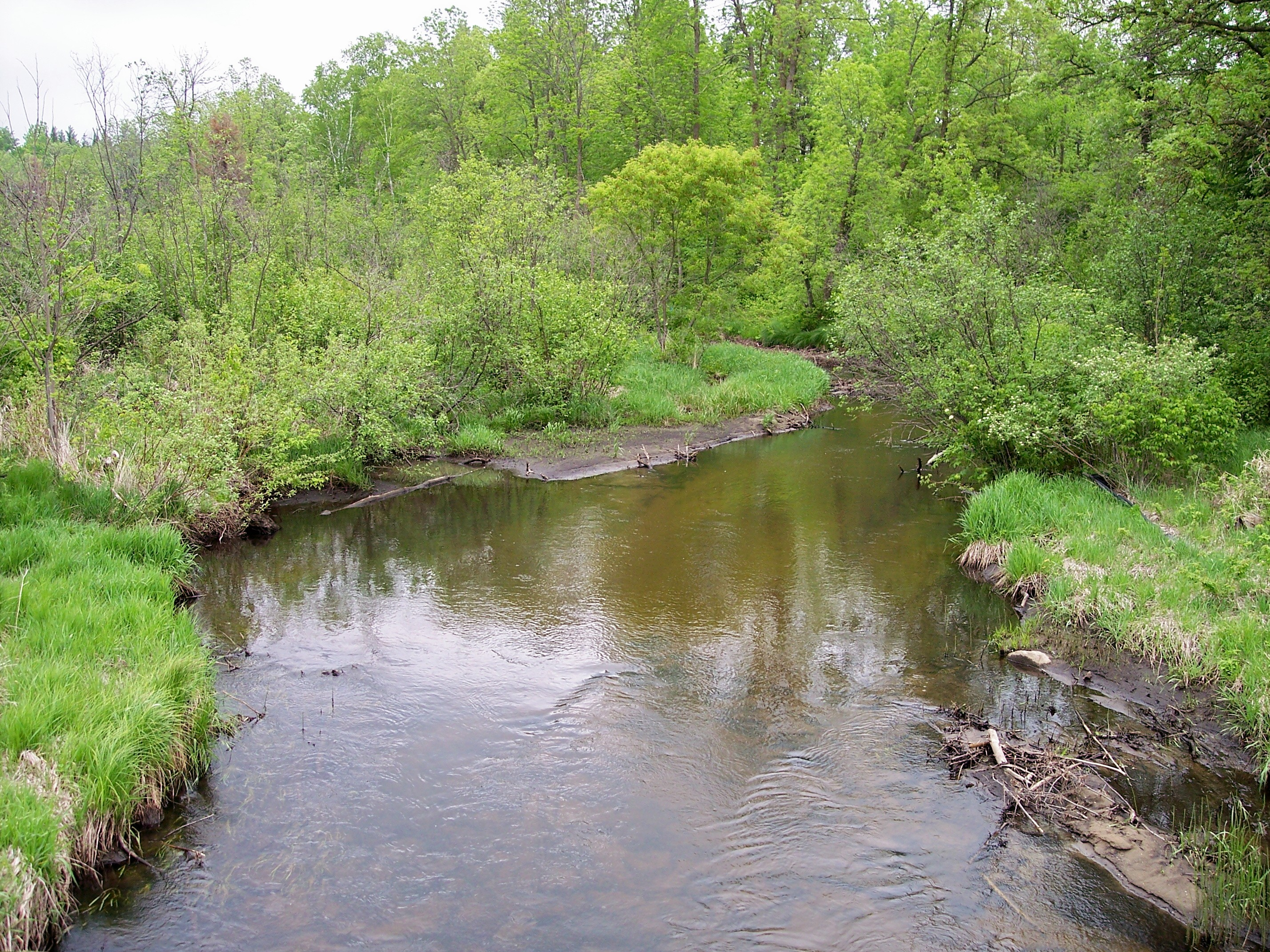
- The Blueberry River in Blueberry Township in 2007

- Location of the mouth of the Blueberry River

Location
- Country: United States
- State: Minnesota

Physical characteristics
- Source
  - location: Green Valley Township, Becker County
  - coordinates: 46°50′30″N 95°16′45″W
  - elevation: 1,506 ft (459 m)
- Mouth: Blueberry Lake, Shell River
  - location: Blueberry Township, Wadena County
  - coordinates: 46°46′48″N 95°05′34″W
  - elevation: 1,362 ft (415 m)
- Length: 20 mi (32 km)

Basin features
- Tributaries
  - right: Kettle River

The Blueberry River is a tributary of the Shell River, approximately twenty miles (32 km) long, in north-central Minnesota in the United States. Via the Shell and Crow Wing Rivers, it is part of the watershed of the Mississippi River, draining a rural area.

The river's name is a translation from its name in the Ojibwe language.

== Geography ==
The Blueberry River rises in Green Valley Township in southeastern Becker County and flows generally southeastwardly. It flows for a short distance in southwestern Hubbard County and enters northwestern Wadena County, collecting the Kettle River and passing through the city of Menahga. It flows into Blueberry Lake on the Shell River in Blueberry Township in Wadena County, approximately two miles (3.2 km) north of Menahga. The Blueberry River flows in the Northern Lakes and Forests ecoregion, which is characterized by conifer and hardwood forests on flat and rolling till plains and outwash plains.

== See also ==
- List of rivers in Minnesota
