= Hubbard, Minnesota =

Community in Minnesota

- Census-designated place
- Location within Minnesota Location within the United States
- Coordinates: 46°50′12″N 95°0′37″W
- Country: United States
- State: Minnesota
- County: Hubbard
- Township: Hubbard

Area
  - Total: 0.10 sq mi (0.26 km^{2})
  - Land: 0.10 sq mi (0.26 km^{2})
  - Water: 0 sq mi (0.00 km^{2})
- Elevation: 1,416 ft (432 m)

Population (2020)
  - Total: 56
  - Density: 567.3/sq mi (219.04/km^{2})
- Time zone: UTC-6 (Central (CST))
  - Summer (DST): UTC-5 (CDT)
- ZIP Code: 56470 (Park Rapids)
- Area code: 218
- FIPS code: 27-30320
- GNIS feature ID: 2806360

Hubbard is an unincorporated community and census-designated place (CDP) in the western part of Hubbard Township, Hubbard County, Minnesota, United States. It is in southern Hubbard County, along Minnesota State Highway 87, at the outlet of Long Lake. Park Rapids is 8 miles (13 km) to the northwest. As of the 2020 census, Hubbard had a population of 56.

Hubbard was first listed as a CDP prior to the 2020 census.

== Demographics ==
Historical population
Census	Pop.	Note	%±
2020	56		—
U.S. Decennial Census
