= Blueberry Township, Wadena County, Minnesota =

Blueberry Township, Minnesota
- Township
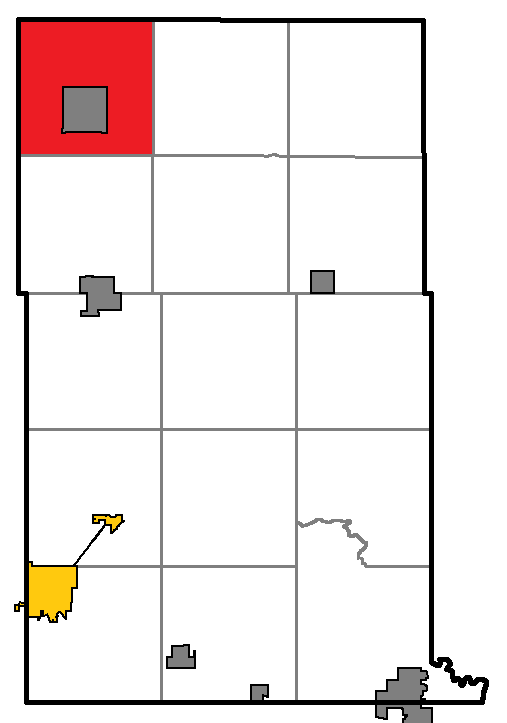
- Location of Blueberry Township, within Wadena County
- Coordinates: 46°46′13″N 95°5′48″W
- Country: United States
- State: Minnesota
- County: Wadena

Area
  - Total: 32.0 sq mi (82.8 km^{2})
  - Land: 30.1 sq mi (78.0 km^{2})
  - Water: 1.8 sq mi (4.7 km^{2})
- Elevation: 1,375 ft (419 m)

Population (2020)
  - Total: 828
  - Density: 27.5/sq mi (10.6/km^{2})
- Time zone: UTC-6 (Central (CST))
  - Summer (DST): UTC-5 (CDT)
- ZIP code: 56464
- Area code: 218
- FIPS code: 27-06670
- GNIS feature ID: 0663623

Blueberry Township is a township in Wadena County, Minnesota, United States. The population was 828 at the time of the 2020 census.

Blueberry Township was named after the Blueberry River.

== Geography ==
According to the United States Census Bureau, the township has a total area of 32.0 square miles (83 km^{2}); 30.1 square miles (78 km^{2}) of it is land and 1.8 square miles (4.7 km^{2}) of it (5.73%) is water. The Blueberry, Kettle, and Shell Rivers flow through the township.

== Demographics ==
As of the census of 2000, there were 732 people, 285 households, and 204 families residing in the township. The population density was 24.3 inhabitants per square mile (9.4/km^{2}). There were 435 housing units at an average density of 14.4 per square mile (5.6/km^{2}). The racial makeup of the township was 98.50% White, 0.96% African American, 0.14% Native American, 0.14% Asian, and 0.27% from two or more races. Hispanic or Latino of any race were 0.41% of the population.

There were 285 households, out of which 29.8% had children under the age of 18 living with them, 63.5% were married couples living together, 4.9% had a female householder with no husband present, and 28.1% were non-families. 26.7% of all households were made up of individuals, and 15.1% had someone living alone who was 65 years of age or older. The average household size was 2.57 and the average family size was 3.09.

In the township the population was spread out, with 27.9% under the age of 18, 4.8% from 18 to 24, 25.5% from 25 to 44, 23.2% from 45 to 64, and 18.6% who were 65 years of age or older. The median age was 40 years. For every 100 females, there were 111.6 males. For every 100 females age 18 and over, there were 107.9 males.

The median income for a household in the township was $35,833, and the median income for a family was $42,647. Males had a median income of $32,054 versus $20,500 for females. The per capita income for the township was $17,780. About 5.9% of families and 7.9% of the population were below the poverty line, including 10.9% of those under age 18 and 5.9% of those age 65 or over.
