= Shell Lake (Becker County, Minnesota) =

Lake in the state of Minnesota, United States

- Gaa-jiigajiwegamaag-zaaga'igan (Ojibwe)
- Location within Minnesota
- Location: Becker County, Minnesota
- Coordinates: 46°56′50.5″N 95°26′50″W
- Type: lake

Shell Lake is a lake in Becker County, Minnesota, in the United States.

Shell Lake was likely named from the shells on the lakeshore. Its name in the Ojibwe is Gaa-jiigajiwegamaag-zaaga'igan meaning "'lake lying near the mountain' lake", in reference to the lake's position along the Smoky Hills complex. Shell River flows out from this lake.

== See also ==
- List of lakes in Minnesota
