= Butler Township, Otter Tail County, Minnesota =

Butler Township, Minnesota
- Township
- Location of Butler Township, within Otter Tail County, Minnesota

- Location within the state of Minnesota Butler Township, Minnesota (the United States)
- Coordinates: 46°39′52″N 95°22′19″W
- Country: United States
- State: Minnesota
- County: Otter Tail

Area
  - Total: 35.9 sq mi (92.9 km^{2})
  - Land: 35.1 sq mi (90.9 km^{2})
  - Water: 0.77 sq mi (2.0 km^{2})
- Elevation: 1,453 ft (443 m)

Population (2020)
  - Total: 256
  - Density: 7.29/sq mi (2.82/km^{2})
- Time zone: UTC-6 (Central (CST))
  - Summer (DST): UTC-5 (CDT)
- ZIP code: 56567
- Area code: 218
- FIPS code: 27-08974
- GNIS feature ID: 0663714

Butler Township is a township in Otter Tail County, Minnesota, United States. The population was 256 at the 2020 census.

== Geography ==
According to the United States Census Bureau, the township has a total area of 35.9 square miles (93 km^{2}), of which 35.1 square miles (91 km^{2}) is land and 0.8 square miles (2.1 km^{2}) (2.17%) is water.

== Demographics ==
As of the census of 2000, there were 315 people, 98 households, and 83 families residing in the township. The population density was 9.0 inhabitants per square mile (3.5/km^{2}). There were 119 housing units at an average density of 3.4 per square mile (1.3/km^{2}). The racial makeup of the township was 96.19% White, 0.95% Pacific Islander, 2.54% from other races, and 0.32% from two or more races. Hispanic or Latino of any race were 2.54% of the population.

There were 98 households, out of which 48.0% had children under the age of 18 living with them, 82.7% were married couples living together, 2.0% had a female householder with no husband present, and 14.3% were non-families. 14.3% of all households were made up of individuals, and 9.2% had someone living alone who was 65 years of age or older. The average household size was 3.21 and the average family size was 3.54.

In the township the population was spread out, with 36.8% under the age of 18, 5.7% from 18 to 24, 28.3% from 25 to 44, 15.9% from 45 to 64, and 13.3% who were 65 years of age or older. The median age was 33 years. For every 100 females, there were 112.8 males. For every 100 females age 18 and over, there were 114.0 males.

The median income for a household in the township was $29,479, and the median income for a family was $31,607. Males had a median income of $23,594 versus $15,938 for females. The per capita income for the township was $10,353. About 11.5% of families and 14.0% of the population were below the poverty line, including 12.5% of those under age 18 and 5.8% of those age 65 or over.

== History ==
Butler Township was organized in 1883, and named for Stephen Butler, a county official.

Between 1900 and 1910, the township's population exploded more than five-fold with a large influx of immigrants and other arrivals, with an increase in population from 260 in 1900 to 1,439 in 1910.

A piece of the township's history is explained in They Chose Minnesota: A Survey of the State's Ethnic Groups, as in 1909 the Minnesota Catholic Colonization Society of St. Paul selected the rapidly growing Butler township as an ideal location for a Dutch Catholic settlement. The plan was spearheaded by a Catholic land spectator named D.S.B. Johnston, who at the time held ownership of roughly 28 of the township's 35 square miles of land. He recruited three Dutch priests from Minnesota to return to their native land to visit several Catholic parishes and preach the benefits of emigration while offering parcels of land for sale as future farmsteads for the newcomers. In return, Johnston also promised the priests he'd recruited 40 acres of land in Butler on which a Catholic church was to be built. The venture proved to be a success, and on March 12, 1910, a party of 76 Dutch immigrants led by the three clergymen, consisting of 9 single agricultural and general laborers and 9 family groups consisting of 17 men, 14 women and 36 children under the age of 12 sailed from Antwerp to New York aboard the Red Star Line steamship Lapland. A 10th family consisting of a Dutch farmer, his wife and nine children were delayed in their departure from Antwerp and were forced to follow the rest of the party aboard the White Star Line steamer Megantic, which departed Liverpool for Boston on March 15.

According to Louis deGryse, the summer of 1910 proved very difficult for the new arrivals, as the intense summer heat and plagues of flies and mosquitoes gave many the desire to leave the area. While some did relocate, most families stayed and developed a prosperous dairying community. In October 1910, the Holy Cross Catholic Church was dedicated, becoming the nucleus of the community.
