= Hubbard Township, Hubbard County, Minnesota =

Hubbard Township, Minnesota
- Township
- Location of Hubbard Township, within Hubbard County, Minnesota
- Coordinates: 46°50′56″N 94°59′45″W
- Country: United States
- State: Minnesota
- County: Hubbard

Area
  - Total: 36.0 sq mi (93.2 km^{2})
  - Land: 32.8 sq mi (84.9 km^{2})
  - Water: 3.2 sq mi (8.3 km^{2})
- Elevation: 1,421 ft (433 m)

Population (2020)
  - Total: 770
  - Density: 23/sq mi (9.1/km^{2})
- Time zone: UTC-6 (Central (CST))
  - Summer (DST): UTC-5 (CDT)
- ZIP code: 56470
- Area code: 218
- FIPS code: 27-30338
- GNIS feature ID: 0664525

Hubbard Township is a township in Hubbard County, Minnesota, United States. The population was 770 at the 2020 census.

The township is named for Lucius Frederick Hubbard, ninth governor of Minnesota.

== Geography ==
According to the United States Census Bureau, the township has a total area of 36.0 square miles (93 km^{2}), of which 32.8 square miles (85 km^{2}) is land and 3.2 square miles (8.3 km^{2}) (8.94%) is water. The Straight, Fish Hook, and Shell rivers flow in the western part of the township. The unincorporated community of Hubbard is near the confluence of the Shell and Fish Hook rivers.

== Demographics ==
As of the census of 2000, there were 786 people, 311 households, and 235 families residing in the township. The population density was 24.0 inhabitants per square mile (9.3/km^{2}). There were 744 housing units at an average density of 22.7 per square mile (8.8/km^{2}). The racial makeup of the township was 98.73% White, 0.76% African American, 0.13% Native American, 0.13% Asian, and 0.25% from two or more races. Hispanic or Latino of any race were 0.38% of the population.

There were 311 households, out of which 29.9% had children under the age of 18 living with them, 68.5% were married couples living together, 4.8% had a female householder with no husband present, and 24.4% were non-families. 22.2% of all households were made up of individuals, and 11.3% had someone living alone who was 65 years of age or older. The average household size was 2.53, and the average family size was 2.95.

In the township, the population was spread out, with 24.8% under the age of 18, 5.2% from 18 to 24, 22.8% from 25 to 44, 28.1% from 45 to 64, and 19.1% who were 65 years of age or older. The median age was 43 years. For every 100 females, there were 112.4 males. For every 100 females age 18 and over, there were 109.6 males.

The median income for a household in the township was $33,679, and the median income for a family was $36,442. Males had a median income of $28,194 versus $22,031 for females. The per capita income for the township was $20,979. About 6.3% of families and 8.1% of the population were below the poverty line, including 13.1% of those under age 18 and 9.9% of those age 65 or over.

== See also ==
- Hubbard Township, Polk County, Minnesota
