= Corliss Township, Otter Tail County, Minnesota =

Corliss Township, Minnesota
- Township
- Location of Corliss Township, within Otter Tail County, Minnesota

- Location within the state of Minnesota Corliss Township, Minnesota (the United States)
- Coordinates: 46°39′47″N 95°28′37″W
- Country: United States
- State: Minnesota
- County: Otter Tail

Area
  - Total: 36.9 sq mi (95.5 km^{2})
  - Land: 35.0 sq mi (90.7 km^{2})
  - Water: 1.9 sq mi (4.8 km^{2})
- Elevation: 1,424 ft (434 m)

Population (2020)
  - Total: 625
  - Density: 17.8/sq mi (6.89/km^{2})
- Time zone: UTC-6 (Central (CST))
  - Summer (DST): UTC-5 (CDT)
- ZIP code: 56573
- Area code: 218
- FIPS code: 27-13240
- GNIS feature ID: 0663871
- Website: https://www.corlisstownship.com/

Corliss Township is a township in Otter Tail County, Minnesota, United States. The population was 625 at the 2020 census.

Corliss Township was organized in 1884, and named for Eben Eaton Corliss, a Minnesota legislator.

== Geography ==
According to the United States Census Bureau, the township has a total area of 36.9 square miles (96 km^{2}), of which 35.0 square miles (91 km^{2}) is land and 1.9 square miles (4.9 km^{2}) (5.02%) is water.

== Demographics ==
As of the census of 2000, there were 462 people, 167 households, and 132 families living in the township. The population density was 13.2 inhabitants per square mile (5.1/km^{2}). There were 266 housing units at an average density of 7.6 per square mile (2.9/km^{2}). The racial makeup of the township was 99.78% White, and 0.22% from two or more races. Hispanic or Latino of any race were 0.22% of the population.

There were 167 households, out of which 36.5% had children under the age of 18 living with them, 75.4% were married couples living together, 1.8% had a female householder with no husband present, and 20.4% were non-families. 17.4% of all households were made up of individuals, and 6.0% had someone living alone who was 65 years of age or older. The average household size was 2.77 and the average family size was 3.15.

In the township the population was spread out, with 28.6% under the age of 18, 7.1% from 18 to 24, 26.6% from 25 to 44, 24.7% from 45 to 64, and 13.0% who were 65 years of age or older. The median age was 37 years. For every 100 females, there were 113.9 males. For every 100 females age 18 and over, there were 112.9 males.

The median income for a household in the township was $37,000, and the median income for a family was $42,679. Males had a median income of $26,667 versus $20,417 for females. The per capita income for the township was $14,936. About 7.1% of families and 8.8% of the population were below the poverty line, including 13.1% of those under age 18 and none of those age 65 or over.
