= Henrietta Township, Hubbard County, Minnesota =

Henrietta Township, Minnesota
- Township
- Location of Henrietta Township, within Hubbard County, Minnesota
- Coordinates: 46°55′52″N 94°57′53″W
- Country: United States
- State: Minnesota
- County: Hubbard

Area
  - Total: 35.1 sq mi (90.9 km^{2})
  - Land: 31.7 sq mi (82.1 km^{2})
  - Water: 3.4 sq mi (8.8 km^{2})
- Elevation: 1,394 ft (425 m)

Population (2020)
  - Total: 1,514
  - Density: 47.8/sq mi (18.4/km^{2})
- Time zone: UTC-6 (Central (CST))
  - Summer (DST): UTC-5 (CDT)
- FIPS code: 27-28556
- GNIS feature ID: 0664455
- Website: https://henriettatownship.govoffice2.com/

Henrietta Township is a township in Hubbard County, Minnesota, United States. The population was 1,514 at the 2020 census.

Henrietta Township was named for Henrietta Martin, the wife of an early settler.

== Geography ==
According to the United States Census Bureau, the township has a total area of 35.1 square miles (91 km^{2}), of which 31.7 square miles (82 km^{2}) is land and 3.4 square miles (8.8 km^{2}) (9.69%) is water.

== Demographics ==
As of the census of 2000, there were 1,582 people, 607 households, and 472 families residing in the township. The population density was 49.9 inhabitants per square mile (19.3/km^{2}). There were 913 housing units at an average density of 28.8 per square mile (11.1/km^{2}). The racial makeup of the township was 97.85% White, 1.14% Native American, 0.51% Asian, and 0.51% from two or more races. Hispanic or Latino of any race were 0.13% of the population.

There were 607 households, out of which 34.8% had children under the age of 18 living with them, 68.4% were married couples living together, 6.4% had a female householder with no husband present, and 22.1% were non-families. 18.8% of all households were made up of individuals, and 7.9% had someone living alone who was 65 years of age or older. The average household size was 2.61 and the average family size was 2.94.

In the township the population was spread out, with 26.5% under the age of 18, 6.7% from 18 to 24, 25.5% from 25 to 44, 27.2% from 45 to 64, and 14.0% who were 65 years of age or older. The median age was 39 years. For every 100 females, there were 107.6 males. For every 100 females age 18 and over, there were 100.3 males.

The median income for a household in the township was $40,061, and the median income for a family was $42,316. Males had a median income of $31,538 versus $20,441 for females. The per capita income for the township was $18,760. About 7.4% of families and 9.4% of the population were below the poverty line, including 14.4% of those under age 18 and 12.2% of those age 65 or over.
