= Straight River Township, Hubbard County, Minnesota =

Coordinates: 46°51′26″N 95°06′07″W

Straight River Township, Minnesota
- Township
- Location of Straight River, within Hubbard County, Minnesota
- Country: United States
- State: Minnesota
- County: Hubbard

Area
  - Total: 35.32 sq mi (91.5 km^{2})
  - Land: 34.29 sq mi (88.8 km^{2})
  - Water: 1.03 sq mi (2.7 km^{2})

Population (2020)
  - Total: 788
  - Density: 23.0/sq mi (8.87/km^{2})
- Time zone: UTC-6 (Central (CST))
  - Summer (DST): UTC-5 (CDT)
- Area code: 218

Straight River Township is a township in Hubbard County, Minnesota, United States. The population was 788 at the 2020 census.

This township took its name from the Straight River.

== Geography ==
According to the United States Census Bureau, the township has a total area of 35.3 square miles (91.6 km^{2}), of which 34.3 square miles (88.8 km^{2}) is land and 1.1 square miles (2.7 km^{2}) (3.00%) is water. The Fish Hook, Straight, Shell and Blueberry Rivers flow through the township.

== Demographics ==
As of the census of 2000, there were 662 people, 249 households, and 204 families residing in the township. The population density was 19.3 people per square mile (7.5/km^{2}). There were 304 housing units at an average density of 8.9/sq mi (3.4/km^{2}). The racial makeup of the township was 99.09% White, 0.15% Asian, 0.30% from other races, and 0.45% from two or more races. Hispanic or Latino of any race were 1.21% of the population.

There were 249 households, out of which 32.5% had children under the age of 18 living with them, 66.3% were married couples living together, 10.4% had a female householder with no husband present, and 17.7% were non-families. 15.3% of all households were made up of individuals, and 4.4% had someone living alone who was 65 years of age or older. The average household size was 2.66 and the average family size was 2.86.

In the township the population was spread out, with 25.7% under the age of 18, 6.9% from 18 to 24, 26.1% from 25 to 44, 27.5% from 45 to 64, and 13.7% who were 65 years of age or older. The median age was 40 years. For every 100 females, there were 96.4 males. For every 100 females age 18 and over, there were 103.3 males.

The median income for a household in the township was $30,952, and the median income for a family was $32,500. Males had a median income of $25,625 versus $23,281 for females. The per capita income for the township was $14,887. About 10.2% of families and 11.3% of the population were below the poverty line, including 14.9% of those under age 18 and 15.5% of those age 65 or over.
