= Wolf Lake, Minnesota =

City in Minnesota, United States

Wolf Lake
- City
- Location of Wolf Lake, Minnesota
- Coordinates: 46°48′10″N 95°21′8″W
- Country: United States
- State: Minnesota
- County: Becker

Area
  - Total: 0.32 sq mi (0.83 km^{2})
  - Land: 0.32 sq mi (0.83 km^{2})
  - Water: 0 sq mi (0.00 km^{2})
- Elevation: 1,570 ft (480 m)

Population (2020)
  - Total: 71
  - Estimate (2021): 68
  - Density: 222/sq mi (85.8/km^{2})
- Time zone: UTC-6 (CST)
  - Summer (DST): UTC-5 (CDT)
- ZIP code: 56593
- Area code: 218
- FIPS code: 27-71338
- GNIS feature ID: 0654321

Wolf Lake is a city in Becker County, Minnesota, United States. The population was 71 at the 2020 census.

== Geography ==
According to the United States Census Bureau, the city has an area of 0.30 square miles (0.78 km^{2}), all land.

== Demographics ==
Historical population
Census	Pop.	Note	%±
1950	109		—
1960	83		−23.9%
1970	58		−30.1%
1980	67		15.5%
1990	35		−47.8%
2000	31		−11.4%
2010	57		83.9%
2020	71		24.6%
2021 (est.)	68		−4.2%
U.S. Decennial Census; 2020 Census

=== 2010 census ===
As of the census of 2010, there were 57 people, 22 households, and 13 families living in the city. The population density was 190.0 inhabitants per square mile (73.4/km^{2}). There were 35 housing units at an average density of 116.7 per square mile (45.1/km^{2}). The racial makeup of the city was 96.5% White and 3.5% from two or more races.

There were 22 households, of which 31.8% had children under the age of 18 living with them, 31.8% were married couples living together, 22.7% had a female householder with no husband present, 4.5% had a male householder with no wife present, and 40.9% were non-families. 27.3% of all households were made up of individuals, and 13.6% had someone living alone who was 65 years of age or older. The average household size was 2.59 and the average family size was 3.46.

The median age in the city was 25.3 years. 35.1% of residents were under the age of 18; 14% were between the ages of 18 and 24; 26.3% were from 25 to 44; 15.8% were from 45 to 64; and 8.8% were 65 years of age or older. The gender makeup of the city was 47.4% male and 52.6% female.

=== 2000 census ===
As of the census of 2000, there were 31 people, 17 households, and 7 families living in the city. The population density was 218.9 inhabitants per square mile (84.5/km^{2}). There were 22 housing units at an average density of 155.4 per square mile (60.0/km^{2}). The racial makeup of the city was 93.55% White, 3.23% Native American, and 3.23% from two or more races.

There were 17 households, out of which 23.5% had children under the age of 18 living with them, 35.3% were married couples living together, and 58.8% were non-families. 52.9% of all households were made up of individuals, and 17.6% had someone living alone who was 65 years of age or older. The average household size was 1.82 and the average family size was 2.71.

In the city, the population was spread out, with 16.1% under the age of 18, 29.0% from 18 to 24, 25.8% from 25 to 44, 16.1% from 45 to 64, and 12.9% who were 65 years of age or older. The median age was 28 years. For every 100 females, there were 106.7 males. For every 100 females age 18 and over, there were 116.7 males.

The median income for a household in the city was $22,083, and the median income for a family was $40,500. Males had a median income of $19,375 versus $21,250 for females. The per capita income for the city was $13,569. There were no families and 7.7% of the population living below the poverty line, including no under eighteens and 33.3% of those over 64.
