= Paddock Township, Otter Tail County, Minnesota =

Paddock Township, Minnesota
- Township
- Location of Paddock Township, within Otter Tail County, Minnesota

- Location within the state of Minnesota Paddock Township, Minnesota (the United States)
- Coordinates: 46°39′50″N 95°13′5″W
- Country: United States
- State: Minnesota
- County: Otter Tail

Area
  - Total: 35.8 sq mi (92.6 km^{2})
  - Land: 35.7 sq mi (92.5 km^{2})
  - Water: 0.039 sq mi (0.1 km^{2})
- Elevation: 1,417 ft (432 m)

Population (2020)
  - Total: 327
  - Density: 9.16/sq mi (3.54/km^{2})
- Time zone: UTC-6 (Central (CST))
  - Summer (DST): UTC-5 (CDT)
- FIPS code: 27-49408
- GNIS feature ID: 0665247

Paddock Township is a township in Otter Tail County, Minnesota, United States. The population was 327 at the 2020 census.

Paddock Township was organized in 1882 and named after L. A. Paddock, the owner of a sawmill.

== Geography ==
According to the United States Census Bureau, the township has a total area of 35.8 square miles (92.6 km^{2}), of which 35.7 square miles (92.5 km^{2}) is land and 0.1 square mile (0.2 km^{2}) (0.17%) is water.

== Demographics ==
As of the census of 2000, there were 323 people, 108 households, and 84 families living in the township. The population density was 9.0 people per square mile (3.5/km^{2}). There were 128 housing units at an average density of 3.6/sq mi (1.4/km^{2}). The racial makeup of the township was 97.52% White, 0.62% Native American, and 1.86% from two or more races. Hispanic or Latino of any race were 0.31% of the population.

There were 108 households, out of which 38.9% had children under the age of 18 living with them, 72.2% were married couples living together, 2.8% had a female householder with no husband present, and 21.3% were non-families. 16.7% of all households were made up of individuals, and 6.5% had someone living alone who was 65 years of age or older. The average household size was 2.99 and the average family size was 3.44.

In the township the population was spread out, with 31.3% under the age of 18, 9.3% from 18 to 24, 23.5% from 25 to 44, 26.3% from 45 to 64, and 9.6% who were 65 years of age or older. The median age was 36 years. For every 100 females, there were 111.1 males. For every 100 females age 18 and over, there were 131.3 males.

The median income for a household in the township was $33,542, and the median income for a family was $35,833. Males had a median income of $21,458 versus $18,875 for females. The per capita income for the township was $14,081. About 7.1% of families and 11.8% of the population were below the poverty line, including 17.4% of those under age 18 and 27.8% of those age 65 or over.
