= Shell River (Minnesota) =

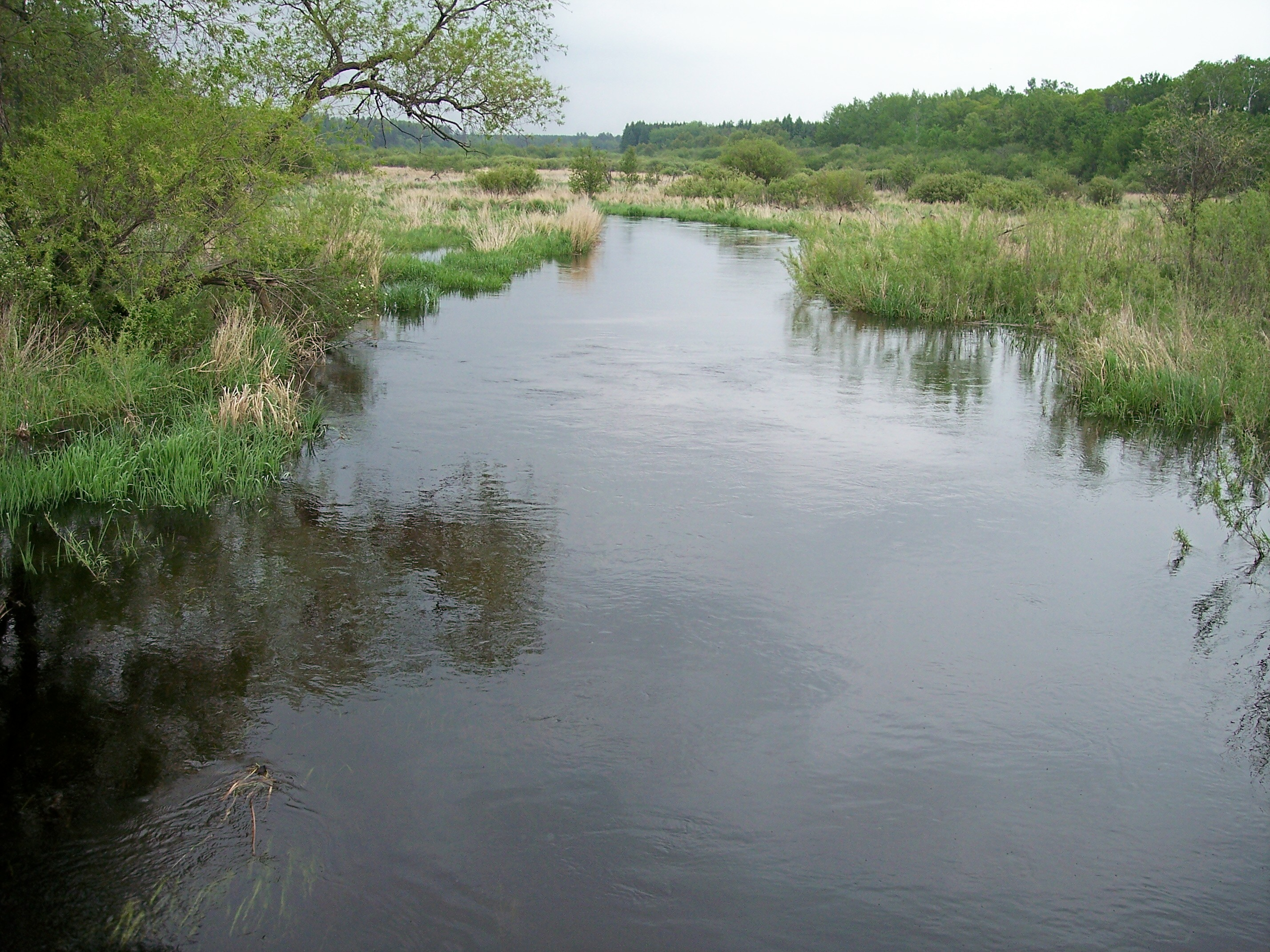
- The Shell River in Straight River Township in 2007

- Location of the mouth of the Shell River in Crow Wing Lake Township

Location
- Country: United States
- State: Minnesota

Physical characteristics
- Source: Shell Lake
  - location: Carsonville Township, Becker County
  - coordinates: 46°56′50″N 95°24′39″W
  - elevation: 1,519 ft (463 m)
- Mouth: Crow Wing River
  - location: Crow Wing Lake Township, Hubbard County
  - coordinates: 46°48′26″N 94°53′16″W
  - elevation: 1,362 ft (415 m)
- Length: 47.8 mi (76.9 km)
- Discharge
  - location: at mouth
  - average: 250 cu ft/s (7.1 m^{3}/s)

Basin features
- Tributaries
  - left: Fish Hook River
  - right: Blueberry River

The Shell River is a 47.8-mile-long (76.9 km) tributary of the Crow Wing River in north-central Minnesota in the United States. Via the Crow Wing River, it is part of the watershed of the Mississippi River, draining a rural region.

The river was named for mussel and clam shells found along the river and along Shell Lake, its origin.

== Geography ==
The Shell River issues from Shell Lake approximately 3 miles (5 km) southwest of Pine Point in Carsonville Township in eastern Becker County, and initially flows southeastwardly through the Smoky Hills State Forest into southwestern Hubbard County and northwestern Wadena County, to Blueberry Lake, which collects the Blueberry River. From Blueberry Lake, the Shell River flows eastwardly in a winding course through northern Wadena and southern Hubbard counties, passing through Huntersville State Forest and collecting the Fish Hook River from the north. It flows into the Crow Wing River in Crow Wing Lake Township in Hubbard County. The Shell River is the Crow Wing River's first significant tributary, and is substantially the larger of the two at their confluence; the Shell's average discharge of 250 cubic feet per second (7.1 m^{3}/s) is approximately three times the Crow Wing's discharge above the confluence.

The Shell River flows in the Northern Lakes and Forests ecoregion, which is characterized by conifer and hardwood forests on flat and rolling till plains and outwash plains. The lower course of the river below Blueberry Lake can be canoed, and supports a sport fishing population of northern pike. Clams are present in great quantities on the river bottom, and the former community of Shell City in Shell River Township was once the site of a button factory which made use of their shells.

== See also ==
- List of rivers of Minnesota
