= Till plain =

Plain of glacial till

Till plains are an extensive flat plain of glacial till that forms when a sheet of ice becomes detached from the main body of a glacier and melts in place, depositing the sediments it carried. Ground moraines are formed with melts out of the glacier in irregular heaps, forming rolling hills. Till plains are common in areas such as the Midwestern United States, due to multiple glaciation events that occurred in the Holocene epoch. During this period, the Laurentide Ice Sheet advanced and retreated during the Pleistocene epoch. Till plains formed by the Wisconsin glaciation cover much of the Midwest, including North Dakota, South Dakota, Indiana, Minnesota, Wisconsin, Iowa, Illinois, and northern Ohio at the Glacial till plains (Ohio).

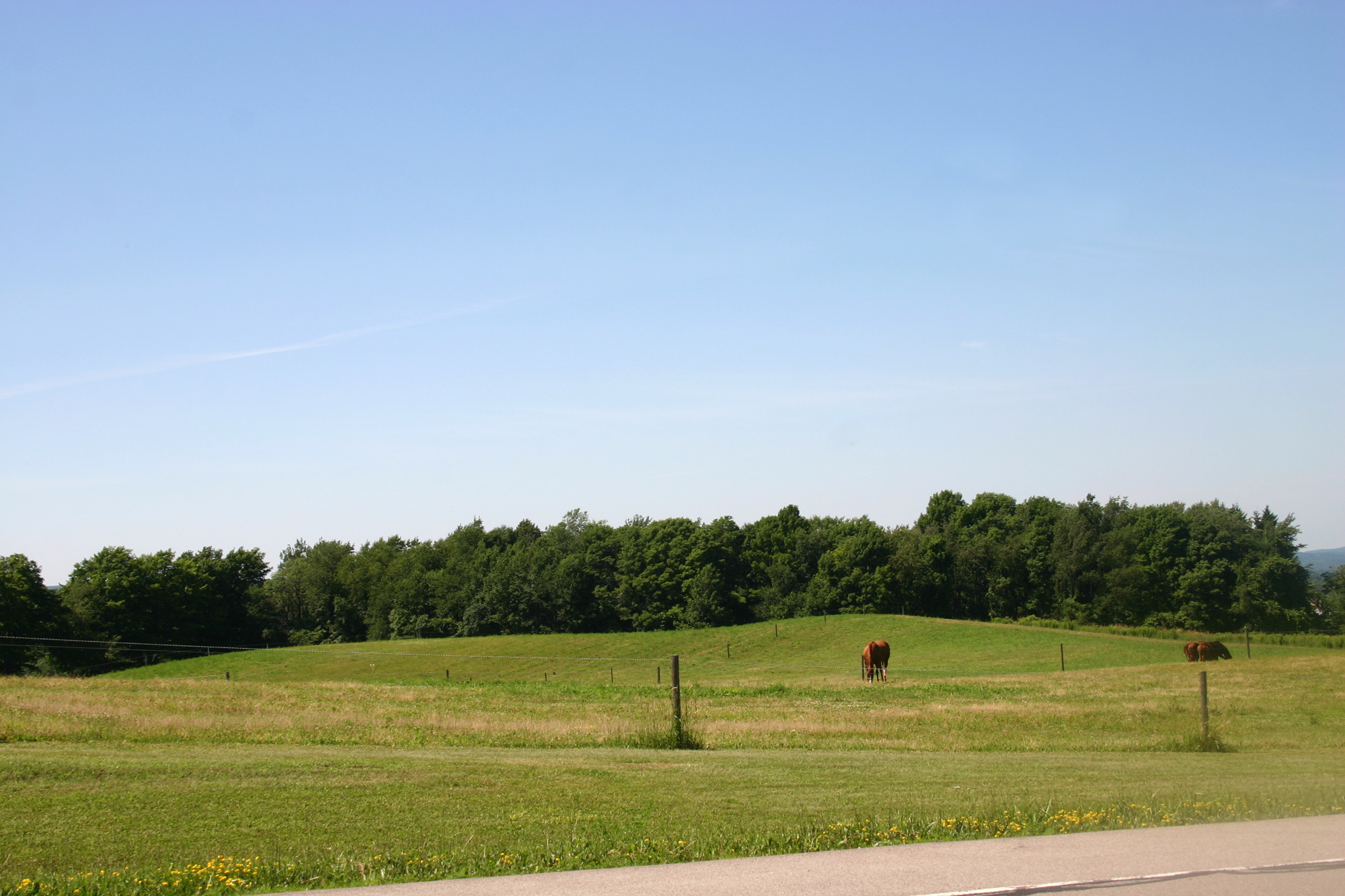
The rolling terrain of the till plain in Gainesville, New York

== Characteristics ==
Till plains are large flat or gently sloping areas of land on which glacial till has been deposited from a melted glacier. In some areas, these depositions can be up to hundreds of feet thick. The morphology of the till plain is generally reflective of the topography of the bedrock below the glacier. Another term for till plain is ground moraine. Not to be confused with outwash plains, till plains differ due to their sorting mechanisms and resulting deposit characteristics. Till plains are deposited as unsorted material picked up by ice as glaciers advance and retreat, or if a body of ice becomes detached from the main glacier and melts in place. Glacial till contain various sizes of material from clay to large glacial erratics, and form a loam texture due to variance in deposited material. Till plains are also the location in which drumlins, drumlin fields, flutes, and additional moraines form, all composed of glacial till. The material composition of till plains vary greatly, and is dependent on the travel path of the transporting glacier, indicated by the provenance of the deposited material. Till plains may be deposited as a single sheet of till, but often a single plain may contain multiple sheets of till. This occurs where changing climate and/or ice dynamics led to multiple phases of glacier advance and retreat.

== Hydrogeologic importance ==
Subglacial meltwater is the main product of glacial ablation. This meltwater acts as the force that causes subglacial tills to deform, and also plays a significant role in shaping the morphology and distribution of the till on the till plain. The composition of till plains is economically important due to their hydraulic properties. This property typically makes them confining units, or aquitards, which inhibit groundwater flow. Meltwater, as well as groundwater, tends to preferentially flow through subglacial sediment deposits, given that they are sufficiently porous, soft, and deformable. The flow regime is assumed to be either darcian or advective flows, although the precise method is often speculated and debated.

== Soil formation and fertility ==
During the last glaciation, much of the Midwestern and Central United States were covered by glaciers. As the glaciers retreated and melted, much of the land was covered in till plains. These till plains were the basis from which the present day soil formed from. The parent material which these soils formed from varies greatly from one area to another, and is dependent on the path of the glacier which deposited the initial glacial till. This has caused different soils to form over time, but most generally share similar properties such as a loamy texture and poor drainage if derived from glacial till. The soils developed from till plains have become some of the most productive agricultural regions in the United States, due to the combination of thick till deposits forming rich fertile soils, and the gently rolling to flat topography being very suitable for farming practices.

== See also ==
- Glacial till plains (Ohio)
- Southeastern Wisconsin Till Plains (ecoregion)
- See plain article for other types of plains.
