= Greater Grand Forks =

Coordinates: 47°55′37″N 97°01′42″W

Greater Grand Forks The Grand Cities The Forks
- Metropolitan statistical area
- Grand Forks, ND-MN Metropolitan Statistical Area
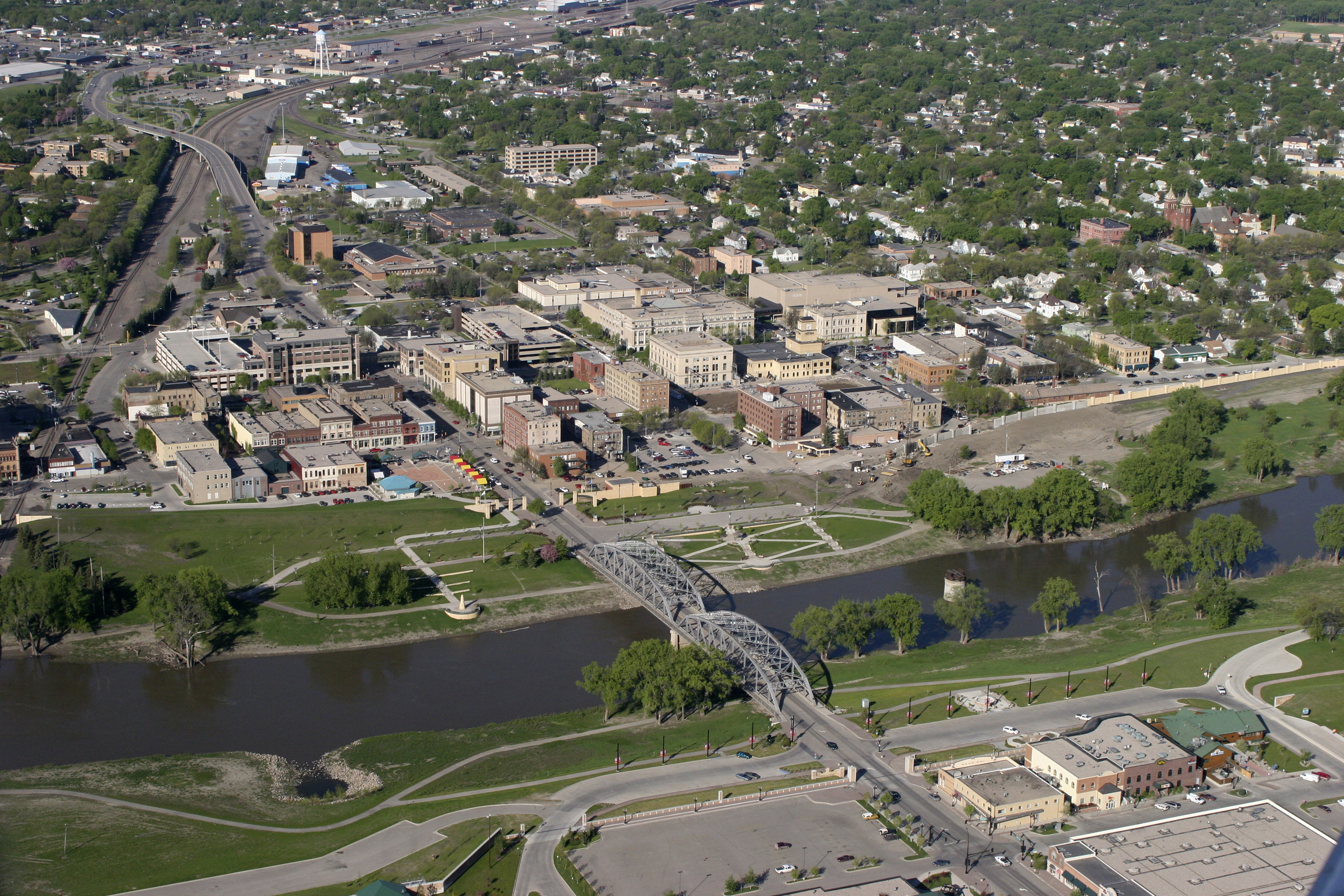
- Aerial View of Downtown Grand Forks (2006)
- Nickname: The Sunflake City
Interactive Map of Grand Forks, ND–MN MSA
City of Grand Forks
City of East Grand Forks
Grand Forks, ND–MN MSA
- Country: United States
- State: North Dakota; Minnesota
- Largest city: Grand Forks, ND
- Other cities: Crookston, MN, East Grand Forks, MN, Fosston, MN, Larimore, ND, Thompson, ND

Area
  - Total: 3,407.352 sq mi (8,825.00 km^{2})
- Highest elevation: 840 ft (256 m)
- Lowest elevation: 778 ft (237 m)

Population (2020)
  - Total: 104,362
  - Estimate (2024): 104,184 ▼
  - Rank: 356th in the U.S.
  - Density: 30.6/sq mi (11.81/km^{2})
- Time zone: UTC–6 (Central (CST))
  - Summer (DST): UTC–5 (CDT)
- Area codes: 218 and 701
- Website: visitgrandforks.com

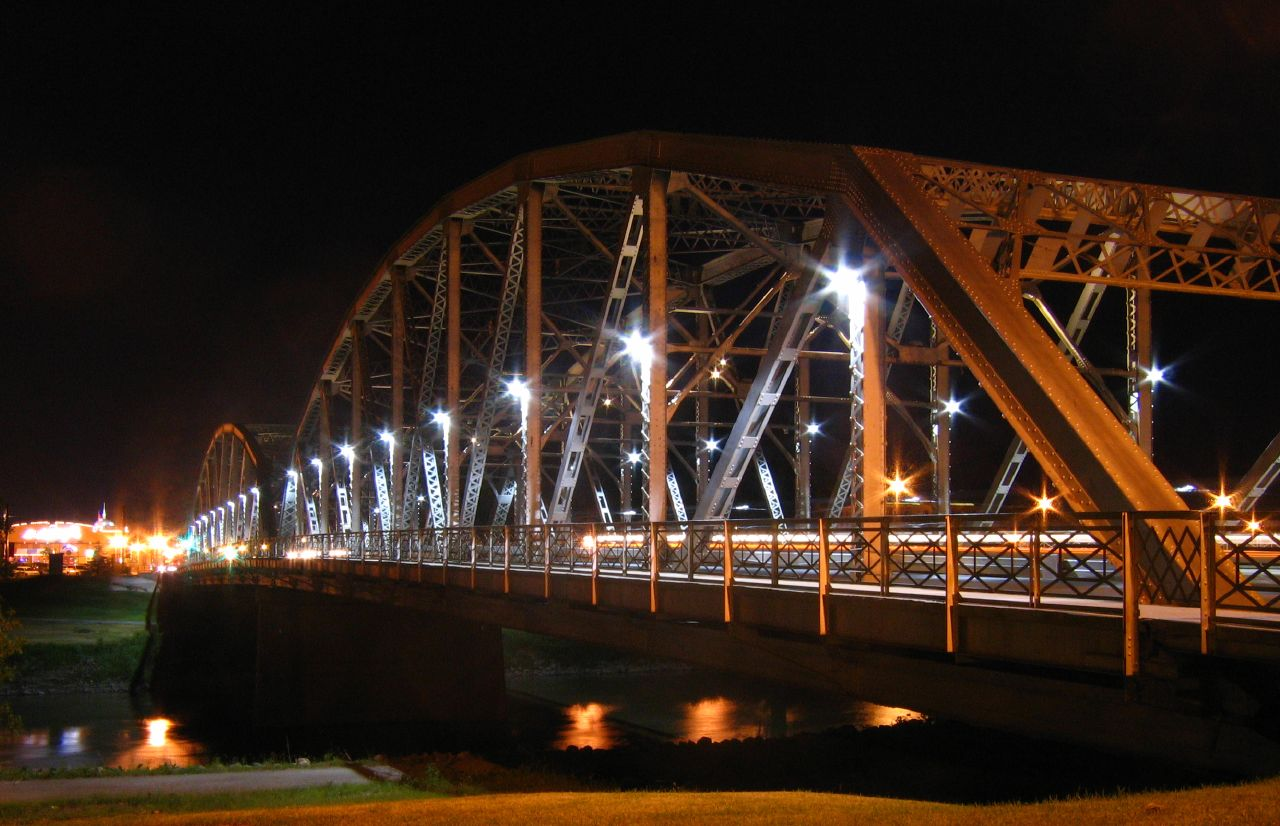
The Sorlie bridge carries DeMers Avenue between Grand Forks and East Grand Forks.

The Greater Grand Forks (officially the Grand Forks, ND-MN Metropolitan statistical area), as defined by the Census Bureau as comprising all of Grand Forks County in North Dakota and Polk County in Minnesota, anchored by the twin cities of Grand Forks, North Dakota and East Grand Forks, Minnesota. As of the 2020 census, the population was 104,362 and was estimated to be 104,184 in 2024.

The metropolitan area is also sometimes called The Forks. Several years ago, local promoters attempted to "brand" the metropolitan area as The Grand Cities. This name has not found widespread use in the area, although several buildings and organizations now bear the "Grand Cities" title. Occasionally, the city of Grand Forks uses the nickname "The Sunflake City."

== Counties ==
- Grand Forks (73,771)
- Polk (30,413)

== Communities ==
=== Incorporated Places ===
- Grand Forks, ND (59,845)
- East Grand Forks, MN (8,915)
- Crookston, MN (7,269)
- Fosston, MN (1,377)
- Larimore, ND (1,239)
- Thompson, ND (1,091)
- Northwood, ND (950)
- Fertile, MN (780)
- McIntosh, MN (581)
- Emerado, ND (450)
- Fisher, MN (403)
- Erskine, MN (387)
- Manvel, ND (366)
- Reynolds, ND (273)
- Gilby, ND (242)
- Climax, MN (241)
- Winger, MN (172)
- Mentor, MN (103)
- Beltrami, MN (90)
- Lengby, MN (89)
- Nielsville, MN (78)
- Gully, MN (55)
- Niagara, ND (42)
- Trail, MN (38)
- Inkster, ND (37)

=== Census-designated places ===
- Grand Forks Air Force Base (2,002)

=== Township Places ===
- Mekinock, ND (2,178)
- Brenna, ND (793)
- Knute, MN (561)
- Allendale, ND (553)
- Walle, ND (530)
- Garfield, MN (511)
- Woodside, MN (505)
- Grand Forks, ND (477)
- Columbia, MN (439)
- Huntsville, MN (435)
- Crookston, MN (414)
- Rye, ND (408)
- Ferry, ND (375)
- Rosebud, MN (310)
- Blooming, ND (293)
- Godfrey, MN (290)
- Arvilla, ND (284)
- Lowell, MN (284)
- Gentilly, MN (258)
- Falconer, ND (254)
- Bygland, MN (251)
- Grove Park-Tilden, MN (251)
- Brandsvold, MN (246)
- King, MN (222)
- Garden, MN (219)
- Queen, MN (216)
- Hegton, ND (201)
- Sletten, MN (195)
- Winger, MN (192)
- Grand Forks, MN (191)
- Hill River, MN (191)
- Inkster, ND (190)
- Eden, MN (188)
- Fisher, MN (185)
- Americus, ND (184)
- Union, ND (182)
- Oakville, ND (180)
- Turtle River, ND (168)
- Roome, MN (163)
- Sullivan, MN (162)
- Fairfax, MN (157)
- Chester, ND (150)
- Esther, MN (150)
- Northland, MN (149)
- Lessor, MN (141)
- Pleasant View, ND (139)
- Euclid, MN (137)
- Gully, MN (135)
- Northwood, ND (135)
- Fairfield, ND (132)
- Rhinehart, MN (127)
- Washington, ND (127)
- Elm Grove, ND (124)
- Michigan, ND (115)
- Tabor, MN (114)
- Badger, MN (112)
- Liberty, MN (112)
- Nesbit, MN (110)
- Andover, MN (108)
- Larimore, ND (104)
- Chester, MN (97)
- Fanny, MN (93)
- Vineland, MN (90)
- Avon, ND (89)
- Johnstown, ND (89)
- Kertsonville, MN (88)
- Strabane, ND (88)
- Angus, MN (83)
- Grace, ND (82)
- Higdem, MN (82)
- Gilby, ND (77)
- Lakeville, ND (76)
- Tynsid, MN (75)
- Agnes, ND (73)
- Reis, MN (73)
- Niagara, ND (70)
- Keystone, MN (69)
- Scandia, MN (66)
- Wheatfield, ND (66)
- Moraine, ND (62)
- Onstad, MN (64)
- Parnell, MN (60)
- Bentru, ND (59)
- Belgium, MN (58)
- Hubbard, MN (58)
- Logan Center, ND (56)
- Loretta, ND (55)
- Lind, ND (54)
- Farley, MN (53)
- Levant, ND (52)
- Brandt, MN (50)
- Plymouth, ND (49)
- Sandsville, MN (46)
- Brislet, MN (45)
- Johnson, MN (45)
- Elkmount, ND (41)
- Hammond, MN (41)
- Helgeland, MN (39)
- Russia, MN (29)

=== Unincorporated places ===
- Arvilla, ND
- Benoit, MN
- Calspur, ND
- Cisco, MN
- Dugdale, MN
- Eldred, MN
- Euclid, MN
- Hannah Junction, ND
- Johnstown, ND
- Kelly, ND
- Kempton, ND
- Key West, MN
- Mallory, MN
- Maple Bay, MN
- Mekinock, ND
- Merrifield, ND
- Powell, ND
- Shirley, MN

== Demographics ==
Historical population
Census	Pop.	Note	%±
1880	17,681		—
1890	48,549		174.6%
1900	59,888		23.4%
1910	63,889		6.7%
1920	65,885		3.1%
1930	67,975		3.2%
1940	72,252		6.3%
1950	75,348		4.3%
1960	84,859		12.6%
1970	95,537		12.6%
1980	100,944		5.7%
1990	103,181		2.2%
2000	97,478		−5.5%
2010	98,461		1.0%
2020	104,362		6.0%
2024 (est.)	104,184		−0.2%
U.S. Decennial Census; 1790–1960 1900–1990; 1990–2000 2010–2020

=== 2020 census ===
As of the 2020 census, there were 104,362 people, 43,192 households, and 24,038 families residing in the MSA. The population density was 30.63 inhabitants per square mile (11.8/km^{2}). There were 48,051 housing units at an average density of 14.1 per square mile (5.4/km^{2}). The racial makeup of the MSA was 83.64% White, 3.87% African American, 2.17% Native American, 2.54% Asian, 0.06% Pacific Islander, 1.55% from some other races and 6.16% from two or more races. Hispanic or Latino people of any race were 5.42% of the population.

=== Age ===
- Under 5 years: 6.3%
- 5–9 years: 5.5%
- 10–14 years: 6.1%
- 15–19 years: 9.6%
- 20–24 years: 13.3%
- 25–34 years: 12.7%
- 35–44 years: 11.3%
- 45–54 years: 13.6%
- 55–59 years: 5.4%
- 60–64 years: 4.2%
- 65–74 years: 5.6%
- 75–84 years: 4.5%
- 85 years and over: 2.0%
- Median age: 31.8 years

=== Ancestry ===
According to the 2006–2008 American Community Survey, the top ten European ancestry groups were the following:

- Norwegian: 38.8%
- German: 32.9%
- Irish: 9.4%
- Swedish: 6.4%
- Polish: 6.2%
- French: 6.1%
- English: 5.2%
- Czech: 2.5%
- American: 2.2%
- French Canadian: 1.8%

=== Language spoken at home ===
- English only: 95.1%
- Language other than English: 4.9%
- Spanish: 2.3%
- Other Indo-European languages: 2.1%
- Asian and Pacific Islander languages: 0.4%
- Other languages: 0.1%

== Education ==
=== K-12 ===
==== Public schools ====
The Grand Forks Public Schools system serves Grand Forks and Grand Forks Air Force Base. The district consists of 12 elementary schools, four middle schools, two high schools, an alternative high school, an adult learning center, and a Head Start program.

The East Grand Forks School District serves East Grand Forks and the surrounding rural areas. The district consists of two elementary schools, a middle school, and a high school.

The Crookston School District 593 serves Crookston and the surrounding rural areas. The district consists of two elementary schools and a high school.

==== Private schools ====
In Grand Forks, St. Michael's Catholic Church and Holy Family Catholic Church both have Catholic elementary schools. There are no Catholic middle or high schools in Grand Forks, but East Grand Forks is home to Sacred Heart Catholic Church's school, which educates from kindergarten through the 12th grade. East Grand Forks is also home to Riverside Christian School, a nondenominational elementary school.

=== Higher education ===
- University of North Dakota (Grand Forks)
- Northland Community & Technical College (East Grand Forks)*
- University of Minnesota Crookston (Crookston)

*also has a campus in Thief River Falls, Minnesota

== Media ==
See Media in Grand Forks, North Dakota for a list of newspapers, television stations, and radio stations

=== Print ===
The major daily newspaper is the Grand Forks Herald. The only other daily newspaper in the area is the Crookston Daily Times of Crookston. The Exponent of East Grand Forks is a weekly newspaper. The Dakota Student is a campus newspaper published twice a week (during the school year) by students of the University of North Dakota. There are also several other weekly newspapers in the area including the Hillsboro Banner.

=== Television ===
The metropolitan area receives all major broadcast networks over the air, along with cable, and satellite television. The major cable television company is Midcontinent Communications.

The only broadcast stations based in the metro area are WDAZ-TV 8 (ABC) and KCPM 27 (MNTV). KVLY-TV and KRDK-TV both have news bureaus in Grand Forks, though the stations are based in Fargo.

Local TV stations include:

- KRDK-TV Channel 4 (CBS) – based in Fargo, ND (digital channel 38)
- WDAZ-TV Channel 8 (ABC)
- WDAZ-DT2, digital channel 8.2, Cable channel 7 (The CW)
- KBRR Channel 10 (Fox) – rebroadcasts KVRR of Fargo, ND
- KVLY-TV Channel 11 (NBC)
- KCGE Digital Channel 16 (PBS) – main studio in Fargo, ND, cable channel 13
- K17HG Channel 17 (3ABN) – religious programming – Digital cable channel 192
- KCPM Channel 27 (MNTV) – cable channel 9
- K49FF Channel 49 (TBN) – religious programming, (Digital cable channel 73, 190 & 109.7)

=== Radio ===
See Media in Grand Forks, North Dakota for a list of all radio stations

There are several radio stations available in the area. All of the commercial radio stations in Grand Forks are owned by either Clear Channel Communications or Leighton Broadcasting. The area is also served by stations of North Dakota Public Radio (KUND 89.3 FM and KFJM 90.7 FM) and Minnesota Public Radio (KQMN 91.5 FM classical music and KNTN 102.7 FM news/talk). Several religious organizations have Christian radio stations throughout the area.

== See also ==
- Metropolitan statistical area
- Minnesota statistical areas
- North Dakota statistical areas
