= Minnesota State Highway 102 =

State highway in Minnesota, United States

Trunk Highway 102
- MN 102 highlighted in red

Route information
- Maintained by MnDOT
- Length: 19.297 mi (31.056 km)
- Existed: April 22, 1933–present

Major junctions
- South end: MN 32 near Fertile
- North end: MN 9 at Fairfax Township, near Crookston

Location
- Country: United States
- State: Minnesota
- Counties: Polk

Highway system
- Minnesota Trunk Highway System; Interstate; US; State; Legislative; Scenic
← MN 101	→ MN 104

Minnesota State Highway 102 (MN 102) is a 19.297-mile-long (31.056 km) highway in northwest Minnesota, which runs from its intersection with State Highway 32 outside Fertile and continues northwest to its northern terminus at its intersection with State Highway 9 (one mile south of U.S. Highway 2) near the city of Crookston.

Highway 102 passes through the communities of Garfield Township, Onstad Township, Kertsonville Township, and Fairfax Township.

== Route description ==
State Highway 102 serves as a northwest–southeast route in northwest Minnesota between the cities of Fertile and Crookston.

Highway 102 is located in the Red River Valley region of Minnesota.

The route is legally defined as Route 178 in the Minnesota Statutes. It is not marked with this number.

== History ==
State Highway 102 was authorized on April 22, 1933.

The route was paved in 1949.

== Major intersections ==
The entire route is in Polk County.

Location	mi	km	Destinations	Notes
Garfield Township	0.000	0.000	MN 32 – Fertile	Southern terminus
Onstad Township	6.395	10.292	CSAH 41 east	Eastern end of CSAH 41 concurrency
Onstad Township	7.217	11.615	CSAH 41 west	Western end of CSAH 41 concurrency
Kertsonville Township	12.562	20.217	CSAH 46 north	
Fairfax Township	14.925	24.019	CSAH 45	
Fairfax Township	19.320	31.093	MN 9 – Crookston, Beltrami, Ada	Northern terminus; roadway continues as MN 9 north
1.000 mi = 1.609 km; 1.000 km = 0.621 mi: Concurrency terminus
