= Minnesota State Highway 32 =

State highway in Minnesota, United States

Trunk Highway 32
- MN 32 highlighted in red

Route information
- Maintained by MnDOT
- Length: 144.845 mi (233.105 km)
- Existed: November 2, 1920–present

Major junctions
- South end: MN 34 / CR 35 near Barnesville
- US 10 near Hawley; MN 113 at Syre; MN 200 near Twin Valley; MN 102 at Fertile; US 2 at Marcoux; MN 92 near Red Lake Falls; US 59 / MN 1 at Thief River Falls
- North end: MN 11 at Greenbush

Location
- Country: United States
- State: Minnesota
- Counties: Clay, Norman, Polk, Red Lake, Pennington, Marshall, Roseau

Highway system
- Minnesota Trunk Highway System; Interstate; US; State; Legislative; Scenic
← MN 30	→ MN 33

Minnesota State Highway 32 (MN 32) is a 144.845-mile-long (233.105 km) highway in west-central and northwest Minnesota, which runs from its intersection with State Highway 34 in Tansem Township near Barnesville and continues north to its intersection with State Highway 11 at Greenbush in Roseau County.

== Route description ==
State Highway 32 serves as a north–south route between Tansem Township, Twin Valley, Fertile, Red Lake Falls, Thief River Falls, and Greenbush in west-central and northwest Minnesota.

The route is also known as:

- 1st Street in Ulen
- 1st Street in Twin Valley
- Mill Street in Fertile
- Main Avenue and Bridge Street in Red Lake Falls
- Broadway Avenue in St. Hilaire
- Main Avenue in Thief River Falls
- 1st Street in Middle River

Highway 32 parallels U.S. 75 and U.S. 59 throughout its route.

The route passes through the Glacial Ridge National Wildlife Refuge in Polk County, east of Crookston, west of Erskine.

== History ==
State Highway 32 was established November 2, 1920. At this time, it ran from State Highway 8 (present-day U.S. 2) east of Crookston to Greenbush.

By 1923, the road was mostly graveled, with a section of unimproved dirt between Holt and Middle River and another north of Strathcona. All graveling was completed by 1930.

In 1933, the route was extended south, from U.S. 2 to State Highway 34 south of Rollag. This extension was graveled in its entirety.

When U.S. 59 was established in Minnesota in 1935, it ran concurrent with Highway 32 between Thief River Falls and present-day Marshall County State-Aid Highway 28 (north of Holt) until 1960.

North of U.S. 2, the highway was paved in sections throughout the 1940s.

South of U.S. 2, the first section of highway to be paved was from the junction with then-Highway 31 (now Highway 200) north of Twin Valley to a point just south of Fertile in 1937; paving was extended into both Fertile and Twin Valley in 1940, as well as from U.S. 10 to Hitterdal (although part of the latter segment was reverted to gravel in 1943). In 1948, it was paved from U.S. 10 north to Ulen, and then from Ulen to Twin Valley the following year. Paving from Highway 102 to U.S. 2 and from Rollag to U.S. 10 was done in 1952 and the final segment from Highway 34 to Rollag in 1954, making the route paved in its entirety.

== Major intersections ==
County	Location	mi	km	Destinations	Notes
Clay	Tansem Township	0.000	0.000	MN 34 – I-94, US 59, Barnesville	Southern terminus
Clay	Eglon Township	15.389– 15.598	24.766– 25.103	US 10 – Moorhead, Detroit Lakes	Interchange
Norman	Home Lake Township	36.460	58.677	MN 113 east – Waubun	Western terminus of MN 113
Norman	Wild Rice Township	44.822	72.134	MN 200 west – Ada	Southern end of MN 200 concurrency
Norman	Wild Rice Township	46.949	75.557	MN 200 east – Mahnomen	Northern end of MN 200 concurrency
Polk	Garfield Township	62.425	100.463	MN 102 north – Crookston	Southern terminus of MN 102
Polk	Grove Park-Tilden Township	77.001	123.921	US 2 – Crookston, Bagley	
Red Lake	Lake Pleasant Township	82.130	132.175	MN 92 east – Brooks	Western terminus of MN 92
Pennington	Thief River Falls	104.234	167.748	US 59 / MN 1 west (3rd Street W, 3rd Street E)	Southern end of MN 1 concurrency
Pennington	Thief River Falls	104.588	168.318	MN 1 east (8th Street E) – Northland Community & Technical College	Northern end of MN 1 concurrency
Marshall	No major junctions				
Roseau	Greenbush	144.879	233.160	MN 11 – Roseau, Karlstad	Northern terminus
1.000 mi = 1.609 km; 1.000 km = 0.621 mi: Concurrency terminus
