= Carlott Funseth Round Barn =

- U.S. National Register of Historic Places
- Location within North Dakota Location within the United States
- Location: ND 38, Kempton, North Dakota
- Coordinates: 47°46′46″N 97°35′56″W
- Area: less than 1 acre (0.40 ha)
- Built: 1909
- Architect: Sven & Ole Olson
- Architectural style: Round barn
- MPS: North Dakota Round Barns TR
- NRHP reference No.: 86002752
- Added to NRHP: October 7, 1986

The Carlott Funseth Round Barn is a round barn in Kempton, North Dakota, United States, that was listed on the National Register of Historic Places in 1986. It's one of few round barns that was still in use as a barn (as of the nomination date, 1986) and has been continuously maintained as a barn.

It was designed and built by Sven Olson and Ole Olson. The previous barn was an octagonal structure, and Sven and Ole must have decided that the round barn layout worked so well for them that they built another round barn instead of going with a conventional rectangular barn. The barn was rebuilt in 1909.

The listing is just for the barn itself and a circle going out 10 feet all around.

The Funseth barn was one of 41 evaluated in a study of North Dakota round barns. The study led to the NRHP listing of 13 barns including:

- Robert Abell Round Barn, NRHP-listed
- Cecil Baker Round Barn, NRHP-listed
- Urbain Cote Round Barn, NRHP-listed
