= Lake Pleasant Township, Red Lake County, Minnesota =

Lake Pleasant Township, Minnesota
- Township
- Location of Lake Pleasant Township, within Red Lake County, Minnesota
- Coordinates: 47°48′37″N 96°17′0″W
- Country: United States
- State: Minnesota
- County: Red Lake

Area
  - Total: 35.9 sq mi (93.0 km^{2})
  - Land: 35.9 sq mi (93.0 km^{2})
  - Water: 0 sq mi (0.0 km^{2})
- Elevation: 1,056 ft (322 m)

Population (2020)
  - Total: 104
  - Density: 2.90/sq mi (1.12/km^{2})
- Time zone: UTC-6 (Central (CST))
  - Summer (DST): UTC-5 (CDT)
- FIPS code: 27-34820
- GNIS feature ID: 0664695

Lake Pleasant Township is a township in Red Lake County, Minnesota, United States. The population of the township was 104 at the 2020 census. The unincorporated community of Marcoux or Marcoux Corner (/mɑːrˈkuː/ mar-KOO) is located within the township.

== History ==
Lake Pleasant Township took its name from a former lake which has since been drained.

== Geography ==
According to the United States Census Bureau, the township has a total area of 35.9 square miles (93 km^{2}), all land.

== Demographics ==
As of the census of 2000, there were 126 people, 41 households, and 35 families residing in the township. The population density was 3.5 inhabitants per square mile (1.4/km^{2}). There were 43 housing units at an average density of 1.2 per square mile (0.46/km^{2}). The racial makeup of the township was 99.21% White and 0.79% African American.

There were 41 households, out of which 41.5% had children under the age of 18 living with them, 75.6% were married couples living together, 7.3% had a female householder with no husband present, and 14.6% were non-families. 14.6% of all households were made up of individuals, and 4.9% had someone living alone who was 65 years of age or older. The average household size was 3.07 and the average family size was 3.37.

In the township the population was spread out, with 31.7% under the age of 18, 6.3% from 18 to 24, 28.6% from 25 to 44, 19.8% from 45 to 64, and 13.5% who were 65 years of age or older. The median age was 38 years. For every 100 females, there were 93.8 males. For every 100 females age 18 and over, there were 115.0 males.

The median income for a household in the township was $41,875, and the median income for a family was $42,813. Males had a median income of $24,583 versus $23,500 for females. The per capita income for the township was $13,242. There were 9.1% of families and 13.6% of the population living below the poverty line, including 16.7% of under eighteens and none of those over 64.

== Marcoux Corner ==
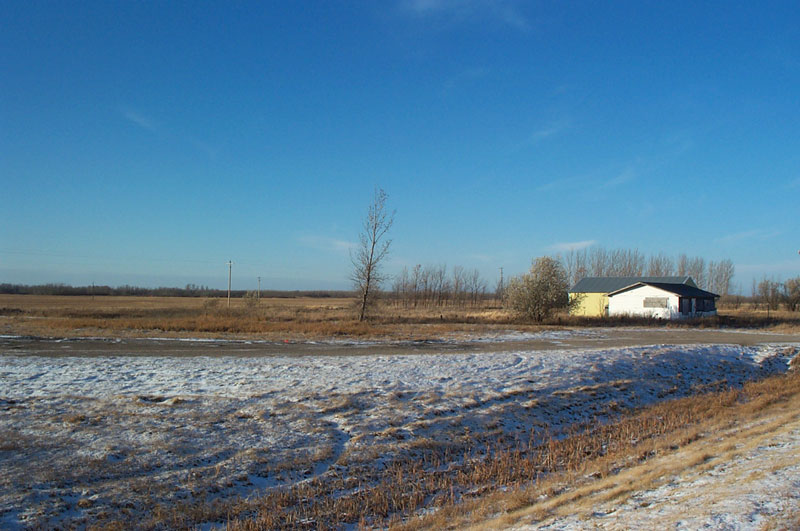
Former site of Marcoux Corner bar

Marcoux Corner was a prominent landmark on an otherwise bleak stretch of U.S. Highway 2 in Polk County, between Mentor and Crookston at the intersection with Minnesota Highway 32. At this spot, originally settled by Edward Joseph Marcoux in 1927, a roadhouse and tavern were established in a former school building relocated in the late 1930s from Cisco in Badger Township, which remained in operation throughout the latter half of the 20th century. After passing through more than a dozen owners, the business closed in 2001. Shortly thereafter, the building was burned down intentionally by the fire department.
