= Badger Township =

Badger Township may refer to the following townships in the US:

- Badger Township, Webster County, Iowa
- Badger Township, Polk County, Minnesota
