= U.S. Route 2 in Minnesota =

Section of U.S. Highway in Minnesota, United States

U.S. Highway 2
- U.S. 2 highlighted in red

Route information
- Maintained by MnDOT
- Length: 264.07 mi (424.98 km)
- Existed: November 11, 1926–present
- Tourist routes: Great River Road; Lake Superior Circle Tour

Major junctions
- West end: US 2 at the North Dakota state line in East Grand Forks
- MN 220 at East Grand Forks; US 75 at Crookston; US 59 at Erskine; MN 92 at Bagley; US 71 at Bemidji; MN 371 at Cass Lake; US 169 at Grand Rapids; MN 200 at Northeast Aitkin; MN 33 at Saginaw; I-35 at Duluth
- East end: US 2 at the Wisconsin state line in Duluth

Location
- Country: United States
- State: Minnesota
- Counties: Polk, Clearwater, Beltrami, Hubbard, Cass, Itasca, Aitkin, St. Louis

Highway system
- United States Numbered Highway System; List; Special; Divided; Minnesota Trunk Highway System; Interstate; US; State; Legislative; Scenic
← MN 1	→ MN 3

U.S. Highway 2 (US 2) is a United States Numbered Highway in northwest and northeast Minnesota, which runs from the Red River at East Grand Forks and continues east to Duluth, where the route crosses the Richard I. Bong Memorial Bridge over the Saint Louis Bay. The route connects the cities of East Grand Forks, Bemidji, Grand Rapids, and Duluth.

Of the 264 miles (425 km) of US 2 in Minnesota, 146 miles (235 km) have four lanes, mostly located in the northwest part of the state.

== Route description ==
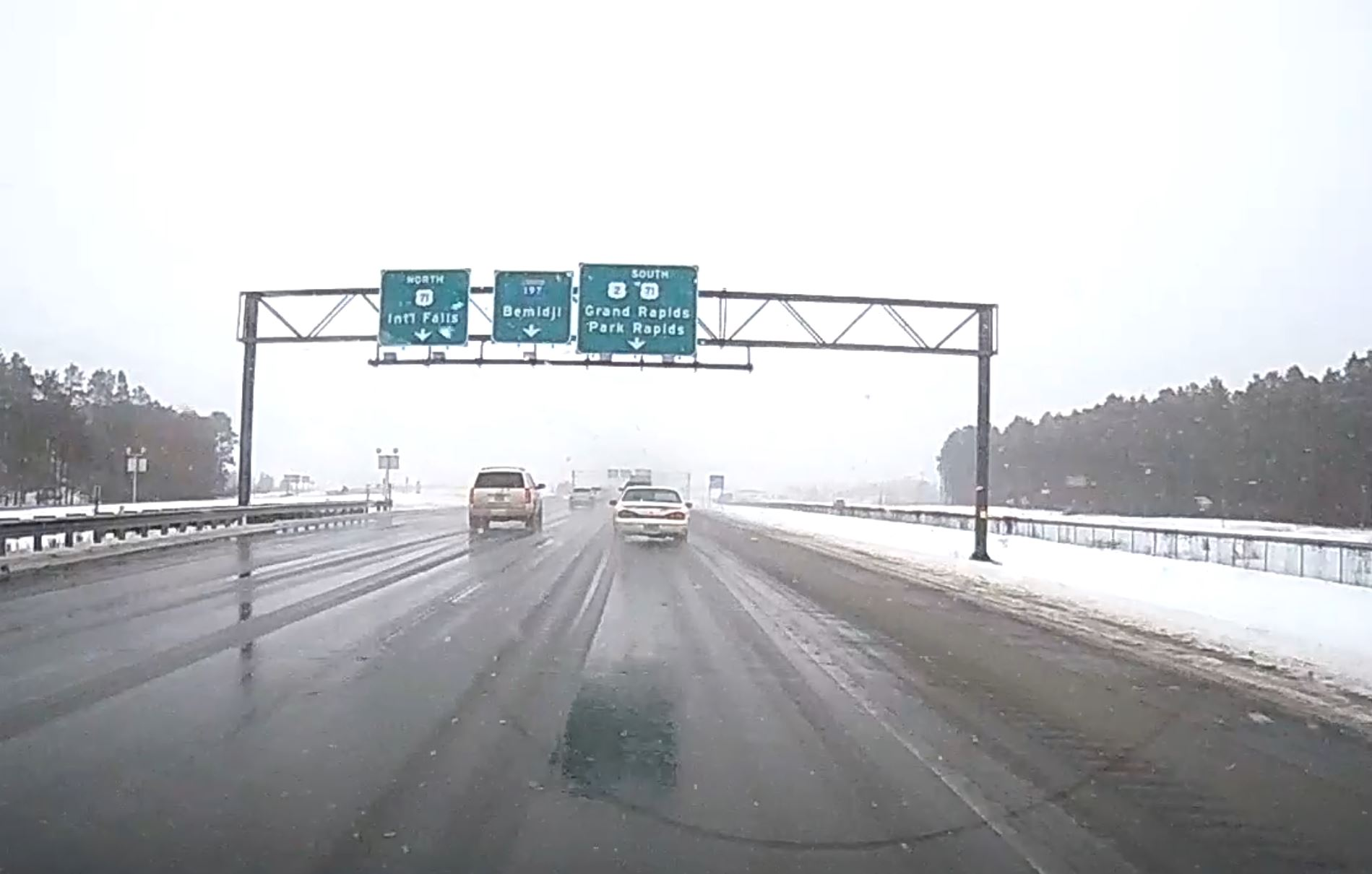
The MN 197 interchange; traffic wishing to continue into Bemidji via MN 197 can use the left two lanes. Likewise, traffic that wishes to stay on the freeway and bypass Bemidji can use the right two lanes.

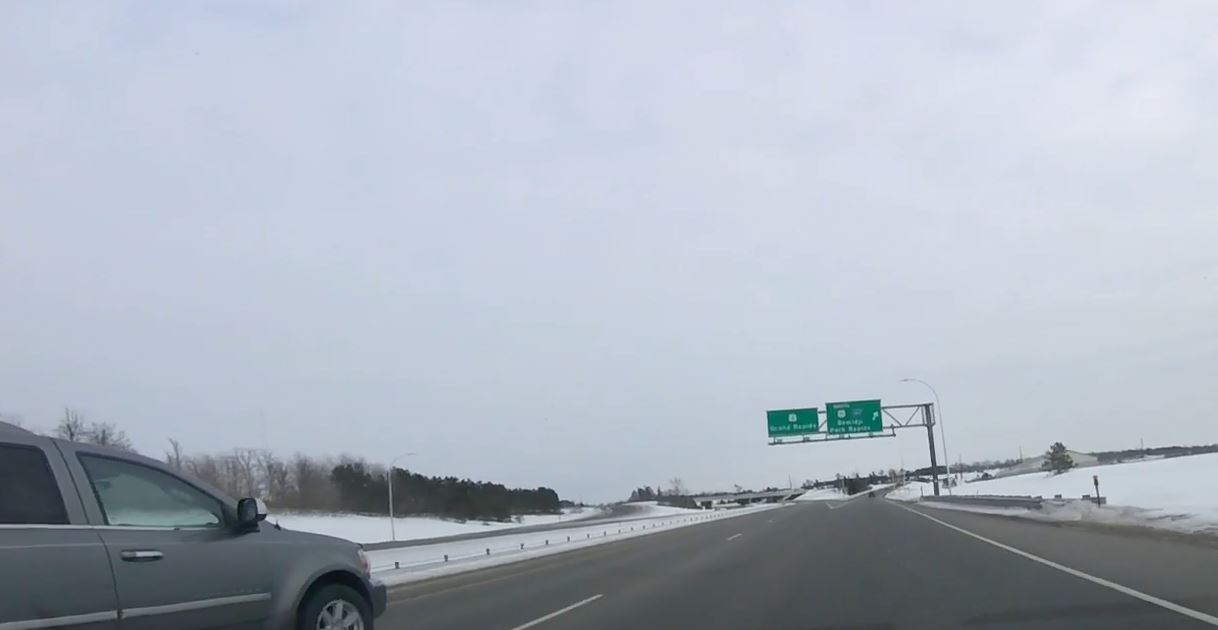
US 71 and MN 197 interchange south of Bemidji at the end of the US 2 concurrency

US 2 enters the state from the west at the city of East Grand Forks, at the Red River. From the North Dakota state line to Crookston, US 2 is a four-lane divided highway built to expressway standards for 26 miles (42 km). Upon entering Crookston, US 2 follows the city streets of North Main, North Broadway, and East Robert streets.

Once US 2 leaves Crookston, it becomes a four-lane divided highway built to expressway standards for 83 miles (134 km). This expressway portion of US 2 in northwest Minnesota passes through the cities of Mentor, Erskine, Fosston, Bagley, and the west of Bemidji.

After the Minnesota State Highway 197 (MN 197) interchange, US 2 becomes a four-lane freeway for nine miles (14 km) as it bypasses Bemidji. US 71 joins the freeway after 1.5 miles (2.4 km) and runs concurrently with US 2 for 4.5 miles (7.2 km). The freeway crosses the Mississippi River after 115 miles (185 km).

The freeway ends at an at-grade junction with Animal Land Drive south of Bemidji. US 2 continues as a four-lane divided highway built to expressway standards for 12 miles (19 km) to Cass Lake. The portion of US 2 from Bemidji to Cass Lake is officially designated the Paul Bunyan Expressway.

After Cass Lake, US 2 continues east as a two-lane roadway for 40 miles (64 km) to Deer River. East of Deer River, US 2 is a four-lane divided highway for seven miles (11 km) until the city of Grand Rapids, where it has a junction with US 169. US 2 then heads southeasterly as a two-lane roadway for 59 miles (95 km) to the unincorporated area of Saginaw, where it has an interchange with MN 33. The route then continues east for two miles (3.2 km) to its intersection with MN 194 at Solway Township. US 2 then continues southeasterly for 12 miles (19 km) before entering the city of Proctor, where it is the main street through town. The route widens to a three-lane roadway as it approaches its intersection with Boundary Avenue (County Road 14 [CR 14]). The route enters the city limits of Duluth, where it has a junction with Interstate 35 (I-35), US 2 joins that route's freeway. US 2 runs concurrently with I-35 for two miles (3.2 km) in West Duluth, proceeding down Thompson Hill. US 2 then exits the I-35 freeway in West Duluth and crosses the Richard I. Bong Memorial Bridge over the Saint Louis Bay, entering the state of Wisconsin and the city of Superior. US 2 then follows Belknap Street in Superior.

Legally, the Minnesota section of US 2 is defined as Constitutional Route 8 and Legislative Route 106 in the Minnesota Statutes §§ 161.114(2) and 161.115(134). The route is not marked with those numbers.

== History ==
US 2 in Minnesota was authorized on November 11, 1926. It followed the route of old state Trunk Highway 8 in its entirety. At the time it was marked, it was paved along a short concurrency with US 75 north of Crookston and from its junction with then-Trunk Highway 11 (present-day US 53) through Duluth. The remainder was graveled or graded, except for a section west of Bagley which was simply a maintained dirt surface.

The route in Minnesota was completely paved in 1939. The last segment to be completed was between then-State Highway 94 (now MN 194) at Solway Township and the community of Adolph.

A few short (four-lane) divided highway segments of US 2 were constructed west of Bemidji during the 1960s. In the present day, from East Grand Forks to Cass Lake, this route is built to expressway standards and a posted 65-mile-per-hour (105 km/h) speed limit. The highway from Bemidji to Cass Lake was designated the Paul Bunyan Expressway in 1991. That designation originally extended down MN 371 to Little Falls, but that section was repealed in 2005.

From Cass Lake to Duluth, there are only a couple of short four-lane divided highway segments, but the nonurban portions of this segment are a posted 60-mile-per-hour (97 km/h) speed limit.

== Major intersections ==
County	Location	mi	km	Destinations	Notes
Red River of the North		0.000	0.000	US 2 west (Gateway Drive NW) – Grand Forks	Continuation into North Dakota
Red River of the North		0.000	0.000	North Dakota–Minnesota state line	
Polk	East Grand Forks	0.830	1.336	MN 220 north (Central Avenue NW) – Alvarado	Western end of MN 220 overlap
Polk	East Grand Forks	4.393	7.070	US 2 Bus. west – East Grand Forks Business District	
Polk	Huntsville Township	5.625	9.053	MN 220 south – Climax	Eastern end of MN 220 overlap
Polk	Lowell Township	23.489	37.802	US 75 south – Moorhead	Western end of US 75 overlap
Polk	Lowell Township	24.365	39.212	US 75 north – Warren	Eastern end of US 75 overlap
Polk	Crookston			CSAH 11 / CSAH 61 / US 2 Truck – Gentilly	
Polk	Fairfax Township	28.934	46.565	MN 9 south – Ada, Fertile	
Polk	Gentilly Township–Kertsonville Township line			CSAH 46 / US 2 Truck – Gentilly	
Polk	Grove Park-Tilden Township	43.038	69.263	MN 32 – Fertile, Red Lake Falls	
Polk	Knute Township	58.197	93.659	US 59 – Mahnomen, Thief River Falls	Interchange
Clearwater	Bagley	88.349	142.184	MN 92 (Main Avenue) – Itasca State Park, Clearbrook	
Beltrami	Eckles Township	108.149	174.049	MN 89 north – Red Lake, Roseau	Interchange; Southern terminus of MN 89
Beltrami	Bemidji Township	110.758– 110.827	178.248– 178.359	MN 197 south – Bemidji	Interchange; Northern terminus of MN 197
Beltrami	Bemidji	111.905– 112.118	180.094– 180.436	US 71 north – International Falls	Interchange; Eastern end of US 71 overlap
Beltrami	Bemidji Township	115.349– 115.387	185.636– 185.697	Mississippi River	
Beltrami	Bemidji Township	116.905	188.140	US 71 south / MN 197 north – Park Rapids, Bemidji	Interchange; Western end of US 71 overlap; Southern terminus of MN 197
Hubbard	No major junctions				
Cass	Cass Lake	129.982	209.186	MN 371 south – Walker	
Mississippi River		160.939– 160.971	259.006– 259.058		
Itasca	Bowstring Lake			CSAH 39 (Ball Club Lake Road) / Great River Road (National Route) north	Western end of Great River Road overlap
Itasca	Bowstring Lake			CSAH 18 (Schoolcraft Park Road) / Great River Road (National Route) south	Eastern end of Great River Road overlap
Itasca	Morse Township	168.032	270.421	MN 46 north – Northome	
Itasca	Deer River	169.051	272.061	MN 6 north – Big Falls	Western end of MN 6 overlap
Itasca	Deer Lake	174.550	280.911	MN 6 south – Remer	Eastern end of MN 6 overlap
Itasca	Grand Rapids	183.479	295.281	MN 38 north – Bigfork, Effie	
Itasca	Grand Rapids	183.698	295.633	US 169 south – Aitkin	Western end of US 169 overlap
Itasca	Grand Rapids	184.130	296.329	US 169 north – Hibbing	Eastern end of US 169 overlap
Itasca	Swan River	203.049	326.776	MN 65 – McGregor, Nashwauk	
Aitkin	Northeast Aitkin	211.261	339.992	MN 200 west – Hill City	
St. Louis	Floodwood	220.754	355.269	MN 73 north – Hibbing	Eastern end of MN 73 overlap
St. Louis	Floodwood Township	221.028	355.710	MN 73 south – Cromwell, Moose Lake	Western end of MN 73 overlap
St. Louis	Stoney Brook Township	239.099– 239.259	384.793– 385.050	Saint Louis River	
St. Louis	Brevator Township	244.837	394.027	MN 33 – Cloquet, Canyon	
St. Louis	Solway Township	246.786	397.164	MN 194 east – Hermantown	
St. Louis	Duluth	260.579	419.361	I-35 south – St. Paul, Minneapolis	Western end of I-35 overlap, exit 250
St. Louis	Duluth	261.141– 261.307	420.266– 420.533	Cody Street	Northbound exit and southbound entrance only, exit 251A
St. Louis	Duluth	261.966	421.593	MN 23 (Grand Avenue)	Southbound exit and northbound entrance, exit 251B
St. Louis	Duluth	262.331	422.181	Central Avenue	Exit 252
St. Louis	Duluth	263.085	423.394	I-35 north / LSCT north – Duluth	Eastern end of I-35 overlap, exit 253A
Saint Louis Bay		264.089	425.010	Richard I. Bong Memorial Bridge; Minnesota–Wisconsin state line	
Saint Louis Bay		264.089	425.010	US 2 east / LSCT – Superior	Continuation into Wisconsin
1.000 mi = 1.609 km; 1.000 km = 0.621 mi: Concurrency terminus; Incomplete access

U.S. Route 2
Previous state: North Dakota	Minnesota	Next state: Wisconsin
