= Minnesota State Highway 9 =

State highway in Minnesota, United States

Trunk Highway 9
- MN 9 highlighted in red

Route information
- Maintained by MnDOT
- Length: 225.945 mi (363.623 km)
- Existed: 1933–present

Major junctions
- East end: MN 23 in New London
- US 71 near New London; US 12 / MN 29 at Benson; US 59 / MN 28 at Morris; MN 27 at Herman; MN 55 near Tintah, Nashua; US 75 at Doran; US 75 / MN 210 at Breckenridge; I-94 / US 52 / MN 34 at Barnesville; US 10 near Glyndon; MN 200 at Ada
- North end: US 2 in Fairfax Township, near Crookston

Location
- Country: United States
- State: Minnesota
- Counties: Kandiyohi, Swift, Pope, Stevens, Grant, Traverse, Wilkin, Clay, Norman, Polk

Highway system
- Minnesota Trunk Highway System; Interstate; US; State; Legislative; Scenic
| ← US 8 | → US 10 |

State Highway 9 or Trunk Highway 9 (MN 9, TH 9) is a 225.945-mile-long (363.623 km) state highway in west-central and northwest Minnesota, which runs from its intersection with MN 23 in New London and continues west and then north to its northern terminus at its intersection with US Highway 2 (US 2) in Fairfax Township near Crookston. This highway has two distinct segments, a north–south section and an east–west section, connected by US 75 between Doran and Breckenridge.

== Route description ==
MN 9 serves as a north–south and east–west route between New London, Benson, Morris, Breckenridge, Barnesville, Ada, and Crookston in west-central and northwest Minnesota.

Monson Lake State Park is located west of Sunburg and west of the junction of 9 and MN 104. The park entrance is located off MN 9 via County Road 95 (CR 95). A portion of the route passes through the Red River Valley region in northwest Minnesota.

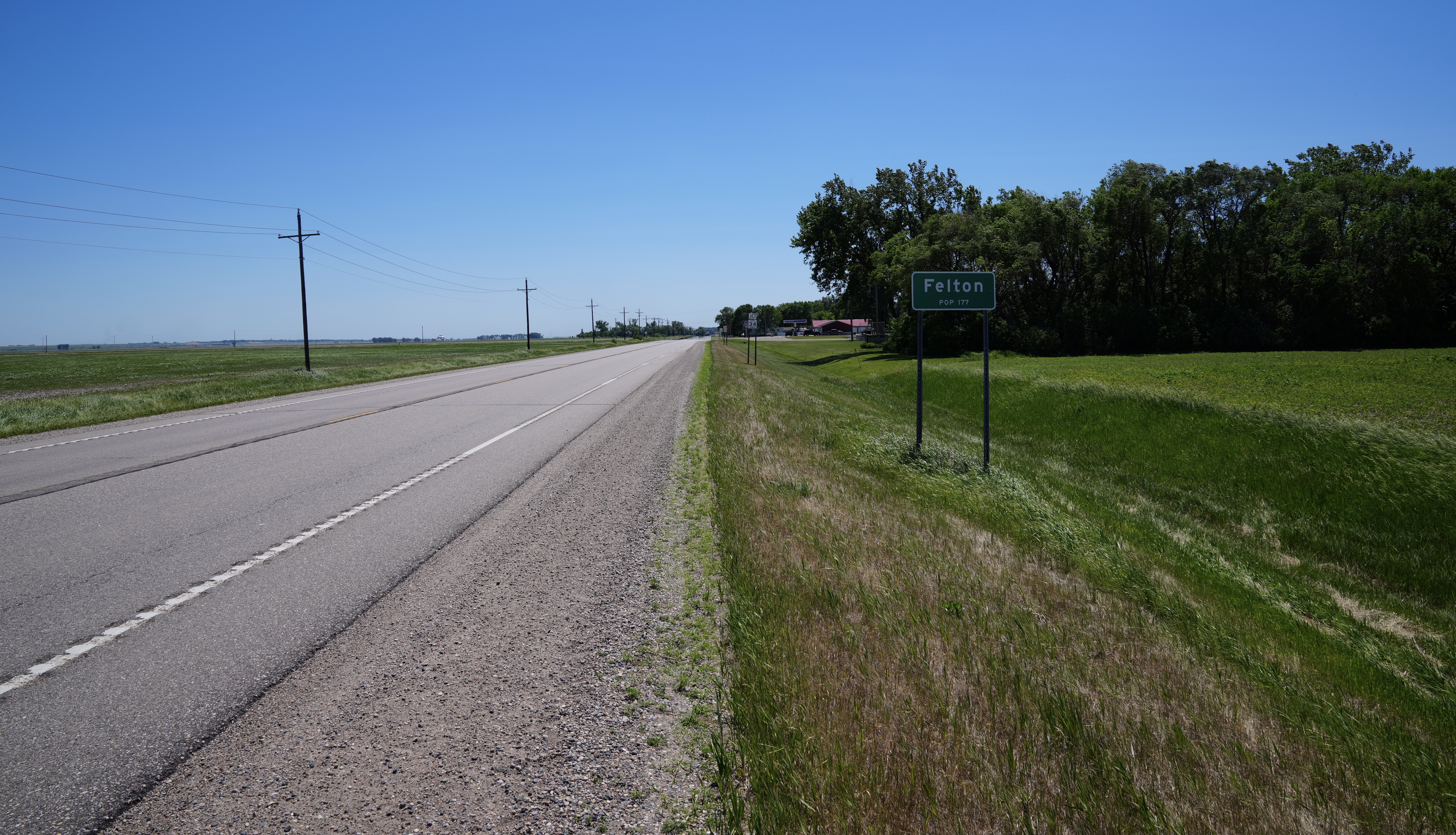
Sign for Felton along MN 9

=== East–west section ===
The eastern terminus for MN 9 is its intersection with MN 23 in New London in west-central Minnesota. The western terminus for the route is its intersection with US 75 in Doran.

=== North–south section ===
The southern terminus for MN 9 is its second intersection with US 75, immediately north of Breckenridge. The northern terminus for the route is its intersection with US 2 in Fairfax Township, immediately east of Crookston in northwest Minnesota.

== History ==
MN 9 was authorized in 1933. At this time, it ran from US 12 in Benson northwest to US 75 at Doran. The last section of the original MN 9 to be paved was the section between Nashua and Norcross, which was paved in 1952. In the mid-1950s, when US 75 between Ada and Crookston was rerouted to another roadway, the MN 9 designation was extended along the former MN 82 from Breckenridge to Ada and along the former route of US 75 to its current northern terminus. This extended segment of the highway was completely paved in 1959; the last section completed was between Barnesville and US 10. In 1961, MN 9 was extended again, replacing MN 17 from Benson to New London.

== Major intersections ==
| County | Location | mi | km | Destinations | Notes |
|---|---|---|---|---|---|
| Kandiyohi | New London | 0.000 | 0.000 | MN 23 – Paynesville, Spicer, Willmar | Eastern terminus for east-west section |
| Kandiyohi | Burbank Township | 5.269 | 8.480 | US 71 – Willmar, Belgrade | |
| Kandiyohi | Sunburg | 16.646 | 26.789 | CSAH 36 / Glacial Ridge Trail Scenic Byway | |
| Kandiyohi | Sunburg | 16.807 | 27.048 | CSAH 7 / Glacial Ridge Trail Scenic Byway | Former MN 104 south |
| Kandiyohi–Swift county line | Norway Lake–Kerkhoven township line | 17.648 | 28.402 | MN 104 north – Glenwood | |
| Swift | Benson | 35.791 | 57.600 | US 12 east – Willmar | Eastern end of US 12 concurrency |
| Swift | Benson | 35.861 | 57.713 | US 12 west / MN 29 – Ortonville, Montevideo, Starbuck | Western end of US 12 concurrency |
| Pope | No major junctions | | | | |
| Stevens | Morris | 59.073 | 95.069 | US 59 – Elbow Lake, Appleton | US 59 crosses bridge over railroad and MN 9; road just to the north connects the highways |
| Stevens | Morris | 60.431 | 97.254 | MN 28 west | Southern end of MN 28 concurrency |
| Stevens | Morris | 60.939 | 98.072 | MN 28 east – Glenwood, Elbow Lake | Northern end of MN 28 concurrency |
| Grant | Herman | 79.565 | 128.047 | MN 27 | |
| Traverse | No major junctions | | | | |
| Wilkin | Champion Township | 98.031 | 157.766 | MN 55 – Nashua, Fairmount ND | |
| Wilkin | Brandrup Township | 110.855 | 178.404 | US 75 south – Wheaton | Southern end of US 75 concurrency; western terminus for east-west section |
| Wilkin | Breckenridge | 119.401 | 192.157 | US 75 north / MN 210 west – Moorhead, Wahpeton | Northern end of US 75 concurrency; western end of MN 210 concurrency; southern terminus for north-south section |
| Wilkin | Connelly Township | 119.820 | 192.832 | MN 210 east – Fergus Falls | Eastern end of MN 210 concurrency |
| Clay | Barnesville | 147.527 | 237.422 | MN 34 – Detroit Lakes | |
| Clay | Barnesville Township | 148.808 | 239.483 | I-94 / US 52 – Fergus Falls, Moorhead | I-94 Exit 22 |
| Clay | Riverton Township | 163.769– 163.784 | 263.561– 263.585 | US 10 – Detroit Lakes, Moorhead | |
| Norman | Ada | 192.995 | 310.595 | MN 200 – US 75, Mahnomen | |
| Polk | Fairfax Township | 224.834 | 361.835 | MN 102 south – Fertile | Northern terminus of MN 102 |
| Polk | Fairfax Township | 225.811 | 363.408 | US 2 – Bagley, Crookston | Northern terminus for north-south section |
1.000 mi = 1.609 km; 1.000 km = 0.621 mi: Concurrency terminus
