= Greenbush, Minnesota =

City in Minnesota, United States

Greenbush
- City
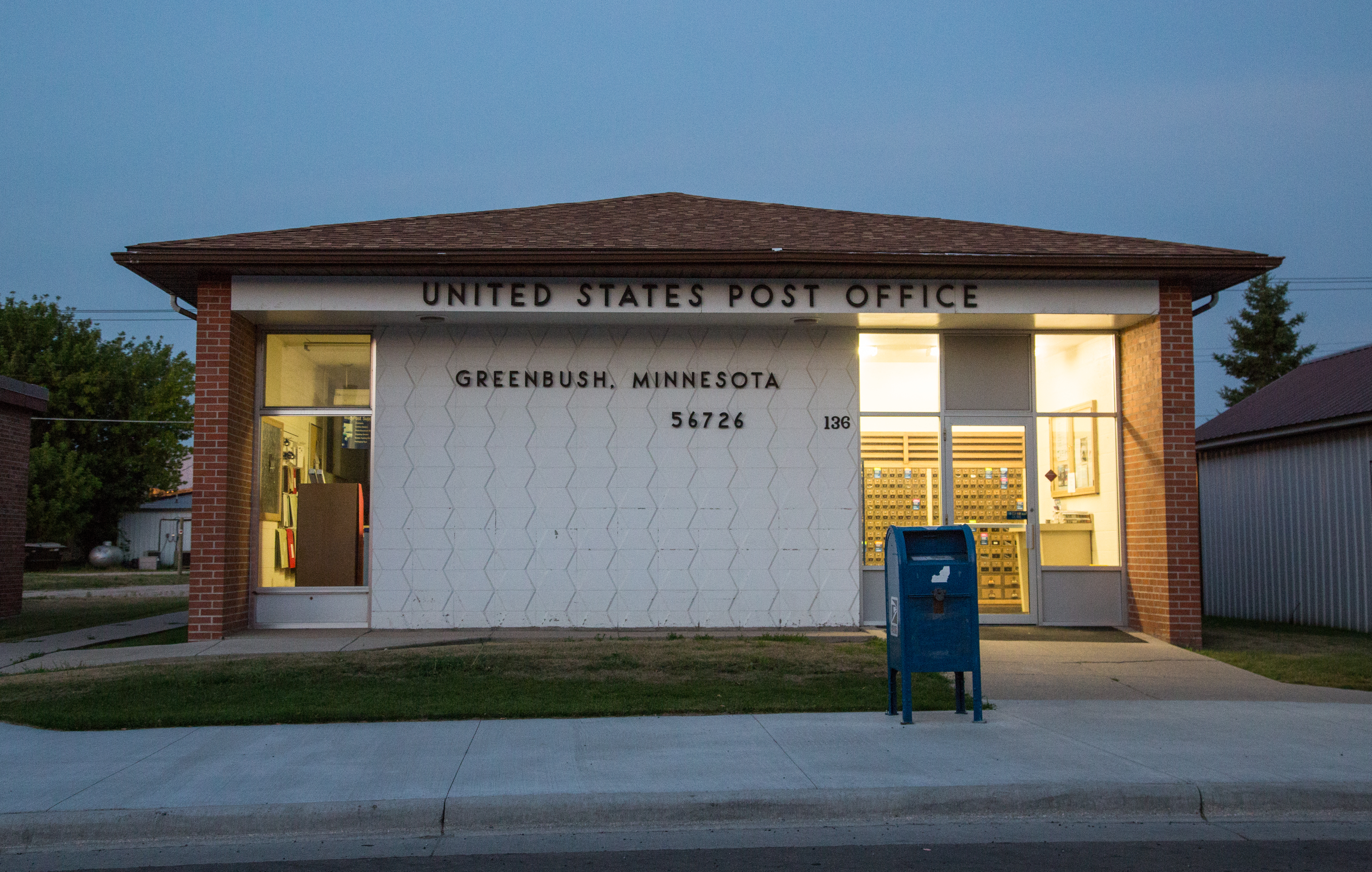
- Post office

- Location of Greenbush, Minnesota
- Coordinates: 48°41′57″N 96°10′59″W
- Country: United States
- State: Minnesota
- County: Roseau

Area
  - Total: 1.54 sq mi (3.98 km^{2})
  - Land: 1.54 sq mi (3.98 km^{2})
  - Water: 0 sq mi (0.00 km^{2})
- Elevation: 1,076 ft (328 m)

Population (2020)
  - Total: 682
  - Density: 444.2/sq mi (171.49/km^{2})
- Time zone: UTC-6 (Central (CST))
  - Summer (DST): UTC-5 (CDT)
- ZIP code: 56726
- Area code: 218
- FIPS code: 27-25604
- GNIS feature ID: 0644432
- Website: greenbushmn.govoffice2.com

Greenbush is a city in Roseau County, Minnesota, United States. As of the 2020 census, Greenbush had a population of 682.

Minnesota State Highways 11 and 32 are two of the main arterial routes in the community.

== History ==
The word Greenbush comes from "Sha Ach Wah," which means spruce tree or green bush in Ojibwe. Scandinavian, Polish and Bohemian settlers arrived in the area in 1880s, with the largest influx immigrating in the early 1890s. The Homestead Act gave 160 acres (0.65 km^{2}) free to settlers if they set up living quarters and developed a few acres into the fields.

The original setting of the city was on a ridge of what was formerly known to be the shores of ancient Lake Agassiz. This village is now referred to as "Old Greenbush," and is marked by Hvidso cemetery (also known as Pioneer Haven) along Highway 11. In 1904, the Great Northern railroad came to the area. It expanded north from Thief River Falls to the location of present day Greenbush, where it stopped construction. Greenbush merchants moved their businesses, buildings and all, to the new town known as "West Greenbush", a feat which they accomplished by rolling the buildings along logs, with horses tied up to posts and walking beside them. Businesses remained open during the moving days.

A few years later, the rail line to Warroad was completed and ran directly through the old town site.

Greenbush officially became a registered city in 1905, with a population of approximately 450 people. Volunteers travelled to Crookston on foot to deliver the official documents, a journey of about 85 miles (137 km) one way.

== Geography ==
According to the United States Census Bureau, the city has a total area of 1.51 square miles (3.91 km^{2}), all land.

== Demographics ==
Historical population
Census	Pop.	Note	%±
1910	274		—
1920	310		13.1%
1930	387		24.8%
1940	556		43.7%
1950	713		28.2%
1960	706		−1.0%
1970	787		11.5%
1980	817		3.8%
1990	800		−2.1%
2000	784		−2.0%
2010	719		−8.3%
2020	682		−5.1%
U.S. Decennial Census

=== 2010 census ===
As of the census of 2010, there were 719 people, 300 households, and 183 families living in the city. The population density was 476.2 inhabitants per square mile (183.9/km^{2}). There were 354 housing units at an average density of 234.4 per square mile (90.5/km^{2}). The racial makeup of the city was 97.6% White, 0.6% African American, 1.0% Native American, 0.1% Asian, and 0.7% from two or more races. Hispanic or Latino of any race were 1.5% of the population.

There were 300 households, of which 30.0% had children under the age of 18 living with them, 47.7% were married couples living together, 6.3% had a female householder with no husband present, 7.0% had a male householder with no wife present, and 39.0% were non-families. 36.0% of all households were made up of individuals, and 19.3% had someone living alone who was 65 years of age or older. The average household size was 2.22 and the average family size was 2.89.

The median age in the city was 44.8 years. 23.6% of residents were under the age of 18; 6.9% were between the ages of 18 and 24; 20% were from 25 to 44; 23.6% were from 45 to 64; and 26% were 65 years of age or older. The gender makeup of the city was 46.9% male and 53.1% female.

=== 2000 census ===
As of the census of 2000, there were 784 people, 317 households, and 194 families living in the city. The population density was 534.6 inhabitants per square mile (206.4/km^{2}). There were 348 housing units at an average density of 237.3 per square mile (91.6/km^{2}). The racial makeup of the city was 98.98% White, 0.38% African American, 0.26% Native American, 0.13% Asian, and 0.26% from two or more races. Hispanic or Latino of any race were 0.13% of the population.

There were 317 households, out of which 28.1% had children under the age of 18 living with them, 52.7% were married couples living together, 4.1% had a female householder with no husband present, and 38.8% were non-families. 36.9% of all households were made up of individuals, and 20.5% had someone living alone who was 65 years of age or older. The average household size was 2.28 and the average family size was 3.02.

In the city, the population was spread out, with 23.2% under the age of 18, 7.1% from 18 to 24, 26.3% from 25 to 44, 18.4% from 45 to 64, and 25.0% who were 65 years of age or older. The median age was 40 years. For every 100 females, there were 95.0 males. For every 100 females age 18 and over, there were 94.2 males.

The median income for a household in the city was $33,750, and the median income for a family was $46,339. Males had a median income of $30,268 versus $20,250 for females. The per capita income for the city was $18,565. About 2.4% of families and 6.6% of the population were below the poverty line, including 2.3% of those under age 18 and 18.2% of those age 65 or over.

== Economy ==
=== Outdoor Furnaces ===
Central Boiler, established in 1984 and located near Greenbush, Minnesota in Northern America, is an outdoor furnace manufacturer. In the mid-1980s, Dennis Brazier founded Central Boiler in his hometown of Greenbush. The company has a sales and dealer network that has now established itself throughout the United States and Canada. Central Boiler remains a privately held corporation. Since 1991, Central Boiler has grown from a 25,000-square-foot (2,300 m^{2}) facility to over a 240,000-square-foot (22,000 m^{2}) manufacturing facility.

Greenbush is also the home of Wahl Bros. Racing.

== Local Life ==
=== Oak View Golf Course ===
Oak View Golf Course is located at 993 Central Avenue West next to the Legion Park. It is a 9-hole Par 35 course with narrow fairways, mature oak trees, and grass greens. The clubhouse has a small pro shop that sells beverages and snacks. The clubhouse is also equipped with modern bathrooms, a kitchen, a dining room, a television, and a porch with picnic tables, gas grills and pop machines. Rental cars, pull carts, and clubs are available.

=== Parks ===
The City of Greenbush provides many parks for the enjoyment of citizens. The parks are located throughout town and offer many different views. Playground equipment, shelters and picnic areas are available at most of the parks. All the parks that have basketball courts provide basketballs for use. The parks include: North End Park, Welcome Park, Shanoah Park, and Legion Park.

=== Swimming Pool ===
The Greenbush swimming pool has changing rooms, showers, heated L-Shaped pool, heated wading pool, diving board and slide. The pool is tentatively open June 1 of each year, closing for the season at the end of August.
