= Fisher, Minnesota =

City in Minnesota, United States

- City
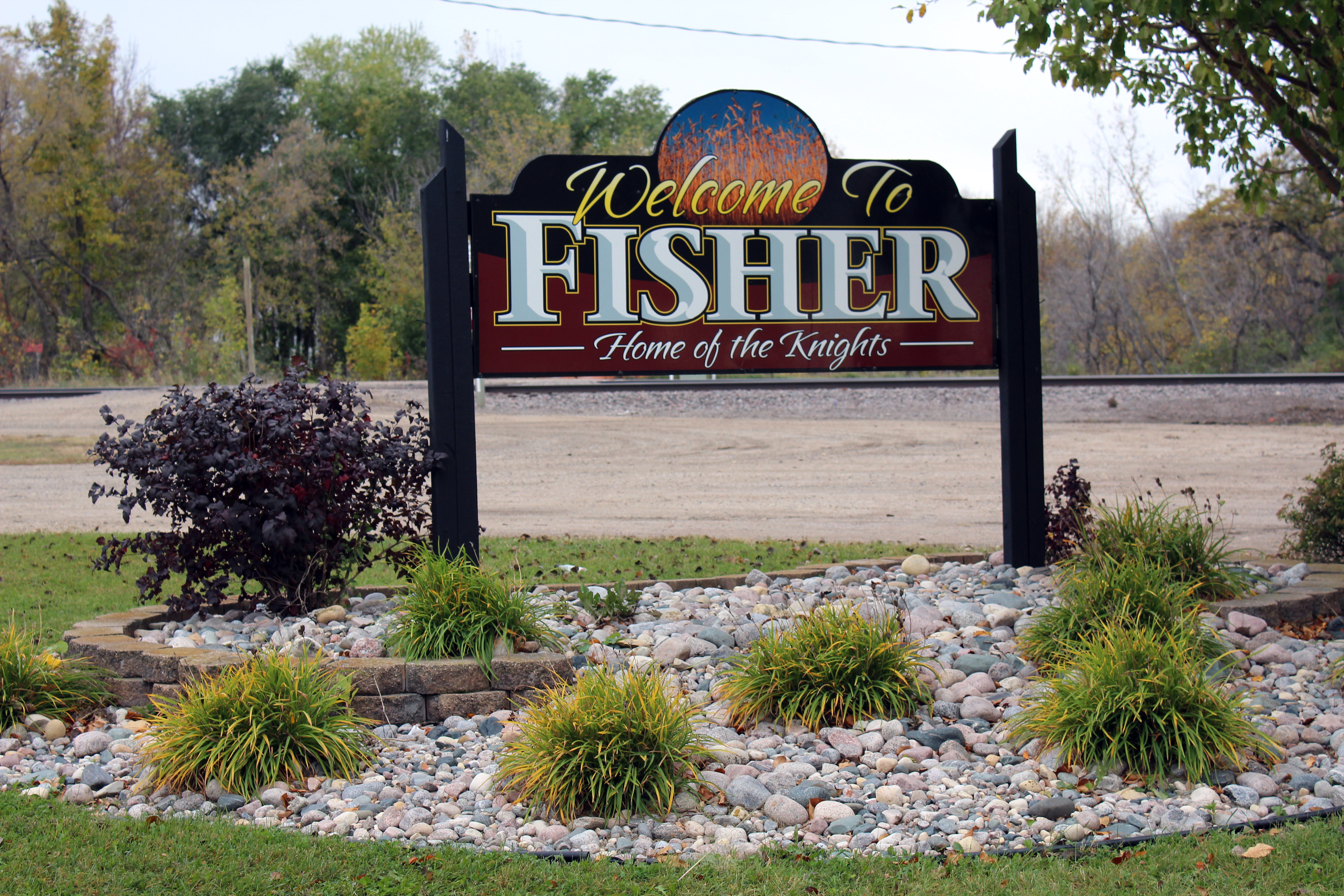
- Welcome sign

- Location of Fisher in Polk County, Minnesota
- Coordinates: 47.7991698°N 96.7995274°W
- Country: United States
- State: Minnesota
- County: Polk
- Metro: Greater Grand Forks
- Founded: 1875
- Organized: 1876
- Incorporated: February 9, 1881

Government
  - Mayor: Emily Tinkham
  - Councilmembers: Laurie Anderson; Mitch Bakken; Mark Clauson; Adam Wagner

Area
  - Total: 0.426 sq mi (1.103 km^{2})
  - Land: 0.426 sq mi (1.103 km^{2})
  - Water: 0 sq mi (0.000 km^{2})
- Elevation: 850 ft (260 m)

Population (2020)
  - Total: 422
  - Estimate (2024): 403
  - Density: 948.4/sq mi (366.19/km^{2})
- Time zone: UTC−6 (Central (CST))
  - Summer (DST): UTC−5 (CDT)
- ZIP Code: 56723
- Area code: 218
- FIPS code: 27-21158
- GNIS feature ID: 2394767
- Sales tax: 7.375%
- Website: cityoffishermn.com

Fisher is a town in Polk County, Minnesota, United States. It is part of the Grand Forks-ND-MN Metropolitan Statistical Area. The population was 422 at the 2020 census. Fisher has become a bedroom community for the nearby Greater Grand Forks Metropolitan Area.

== History ==
Fisher is one of the oldest settlements in Polk County. It was originally named "Shirt-Tail Bend" because a shirt had once been tied to a stick to warn steamboats of a bend in the river. It was renamed 'Fisher's Landing', and later shortened to Fisher. These names were adopted in honor of William H. Fisher, who was born in Hunterdon county, N. J., December 24, 1844; engaged in railroad business after 1864; settled in St. Paul in 1873, as attorney for the receiver of the St. Paul and Pacific railroad, and as its assistant manager and superintendent; later was president and manager of the St. Paul and Duluth railroad company, 1883–99; was vice president and general manager of the Duluth and Winnipeg railroad company, 1888-93.

== Geography ==
According to the United States Census Bureau, the city has a total area of 0.426 square miles (1.10 km^{2}), all land.

== Demographics ==
Historical population
Census	Pop.	Note	%±
1880	239		—
1890	481		101.3%
1900	410		−14.8%
1910	328		−20.0%
1920	305		−7.0%
1930	297		−2.6%
1940	333		12.1%
1950	302		−9.3%
1960	326		7.9%
1970	383		17.5%
1980	453		18.3%
1990	395		−12.8%
2000	435		10.1%
2010	435		0.0%
2020	422		−3.0%
2024 (est.)	403		−4.5%
U.S. Decennial Census; 2020 Census

As of the 2022 American Community Survey, there are 159 estimated households in Fisher with an average of 2.41 persons per household. The city has a median household income of $88,393. Approximately 8.6% of the city's population lives at or below the poverty line. Fisher has an estimated 71.7% employment rate, with 25.8% of the population holding a bachelor's degree or higher and 97.1% holding a high school diploma.

The top five reported ancestries (people were allowed to report up to two ancestries, thus the figures will generally add to more than 100%) were English (94.6%), Spanish (1.6%), Indo-European (3.8%), Asian and Pacific Islander (0.0%), and Other (0.0%).

The median age in the city was 31.6 years.

Fisher, Minnesota – racial and ethnic composition Note: the US Census treats Hispanic/Latino as an ethnic category. This table excludes Latinos from the racial categories and assigns them to a separate category. Hispanics/Latinos may be of any race.
Race / ethnicity (NH = non-Hispanic)	Pop. 2000	Pop. 2010	Pop. 2020	% 2000	% 2010	% 2020
White alone (NH)	424	409	378	97.47%	94.02%	89.57%
Black or African American alone (NH)	0	1	0	0.00%	0.23%	0.00%
Native American or Alaska Native alone (NH)	0	4	3	0.00%	0.92%	0.71%
Asian alone (NH)	0	0	0	0.00%	0.00%	0.00%
Pacific Islander alone (NH)	0	0	0	0.00%	0.00%	0.00%
Other race alone (NH)	0	0	2	0.00%	0.00%	0.47%
Mixed race or multiracial (NH)	1	1	20	0.23%	0.23%	4.74%
Hispanic or Latino (any race)	10	20	19	2.30%	4.60%	4.50%
Total	435	435	422	100.00%	100.00%	100.00%

=== 2020 census ===
As of the 2020 census, there were 422 people and 171 households, and 99 families residing in the city. The population density was 990.6 inhabitants per square mile (382.5/km^{2}). There were 196 housing units at an average density of 460.1 inhabitants per square mile (177.6/km^{2}). The racial makeup of the city was 91.00% White, 0.24% African American, 0.71% Native American, 0.00% Asian, 0.00% Pacific Islander, 2.37% from some other races and 5.69% from two or more races. Hispanic or Latino people of any race were 4.50% of the population. 24.0% of residents were under the age of 18, 3.9% were under 5 years of age, and 13.3% were 65 and older.

=== 2010 census ===
As of the 2010 census, there were 435 people, 180 households, and 114 families living in the city. The population density was 1,011.6 inhabitants per square mile (390.6/km^{2}). There were 196 housing units at an average density of 455.8 inhabitants per square mile (176.0/km^{2}). The racial makeup of the city was 97.93% White, 0.23% African American, 0.92% Native American, 0.00% Asian, 0.00% Pacific Islander, 0.69% from some other races and 0.23% from two or more races. Hispanic or Latino people of any race were 4.60% of the population.

There were 180 households, of which 35.6% had children under the age of 18 living with them, 50.6% were married couples living together, 8.3% had a female householder with no husband present, 4.4% had a male householder with no wife present, and 36.7% were non-families. 29.4% of all households were made up of individuals, and 13.9% had someone living alone who was 65 years of age or older. The average household size was 2.42 and the average family size was 3.07.

The median age in the city was 32.2 years. 25.7% of residents were under the age of 18; 11.5% were between the ages of 18 and 24; 28.5% were from 25 to 44; 19.5% were from 45 to 64; and 14.7% were 65 years of age or older. The gender makeup of the city was 50.3% male and 49.7% female.

=== 2000 census ===
As of the 2000 census, there were 435 people, 177 households, and 120 families living in the city. The population density was 1,092.3 inhabitants per square mile (421.7/km^{2}). There were 197 housing units at an average density of 494.7 inhabitants per square mile (191.0/km^{2}). The racial makeup of the city was 98.62% White, 1.15% African American, 0.00% Native American, 0.00% Asian, 0.00% Pacific Islander, 0.00% from some other races and 0.23% from two or more races. Hispanic or Latino people of any race were 2.30% of the population.

There were 177 households, out of which 28.8% had children under the age of 18 living with them, 52.0% were married couples living together, 12.4% had a female householder with no husband present, and 32.2% were non-families. 26.6% of all households were made up of individuals, and 14.7% had someone living alone who was 65 years of age or older. The average household size was 2.46 and the average family size was 2.93.

In the city, the population was spread out, with 26.0% under the age of 18, 7.8% from 18 to 24, 29.0% from 25 to 44, 22.3% from 45 to 64, and 14.9% who were 65 years of age or older. The median age was 37 years. For every 100 females, there were 99.5 males. For every 100 females age 18 and over, there were 98.8 males.

The median income for a household in the city was $38,750, and the median income for a family was $49,444. Males had a median income of $32,656 versus $20,208 for females. The per capita income for the city was $19,083. About 5.5% of families and 6.8% of the population were below the poverty line, including 13.5% of those under age 18 and 3.3% of those age 65 or over.

== Gallery ==
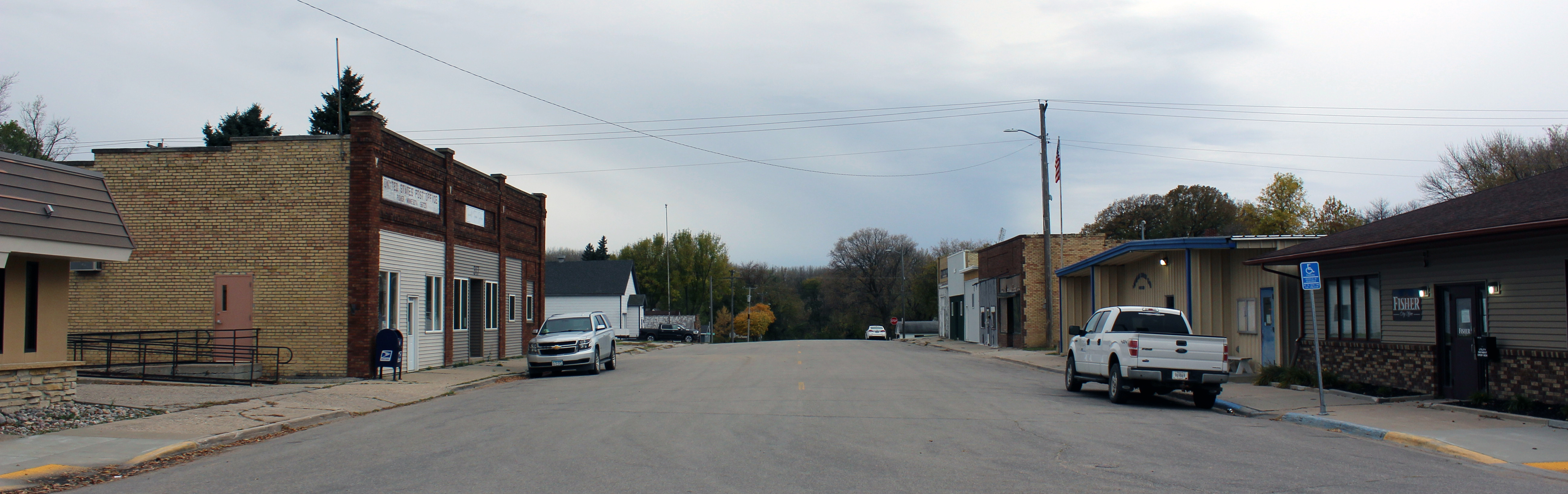
Businesses on Thompson Avenue

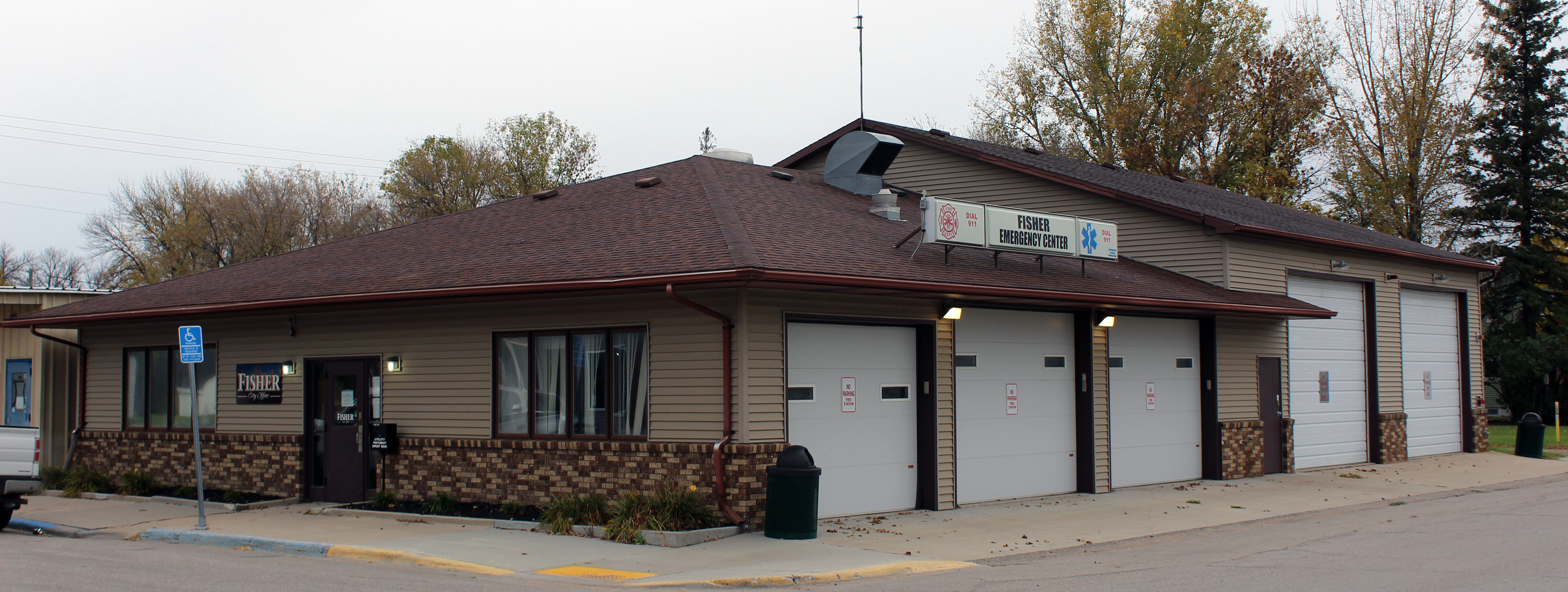
Fisher Emergency Center

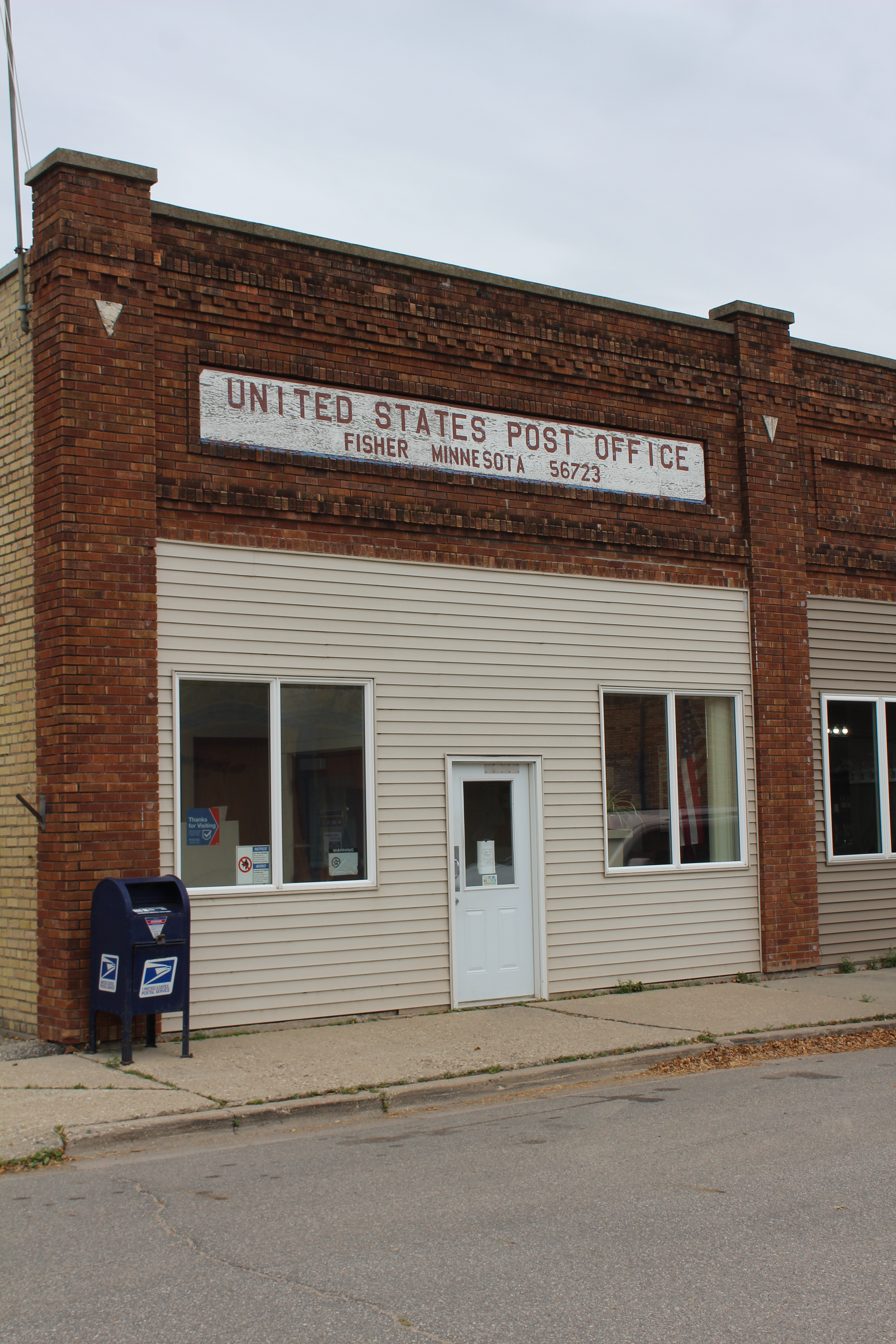
United States Post Office

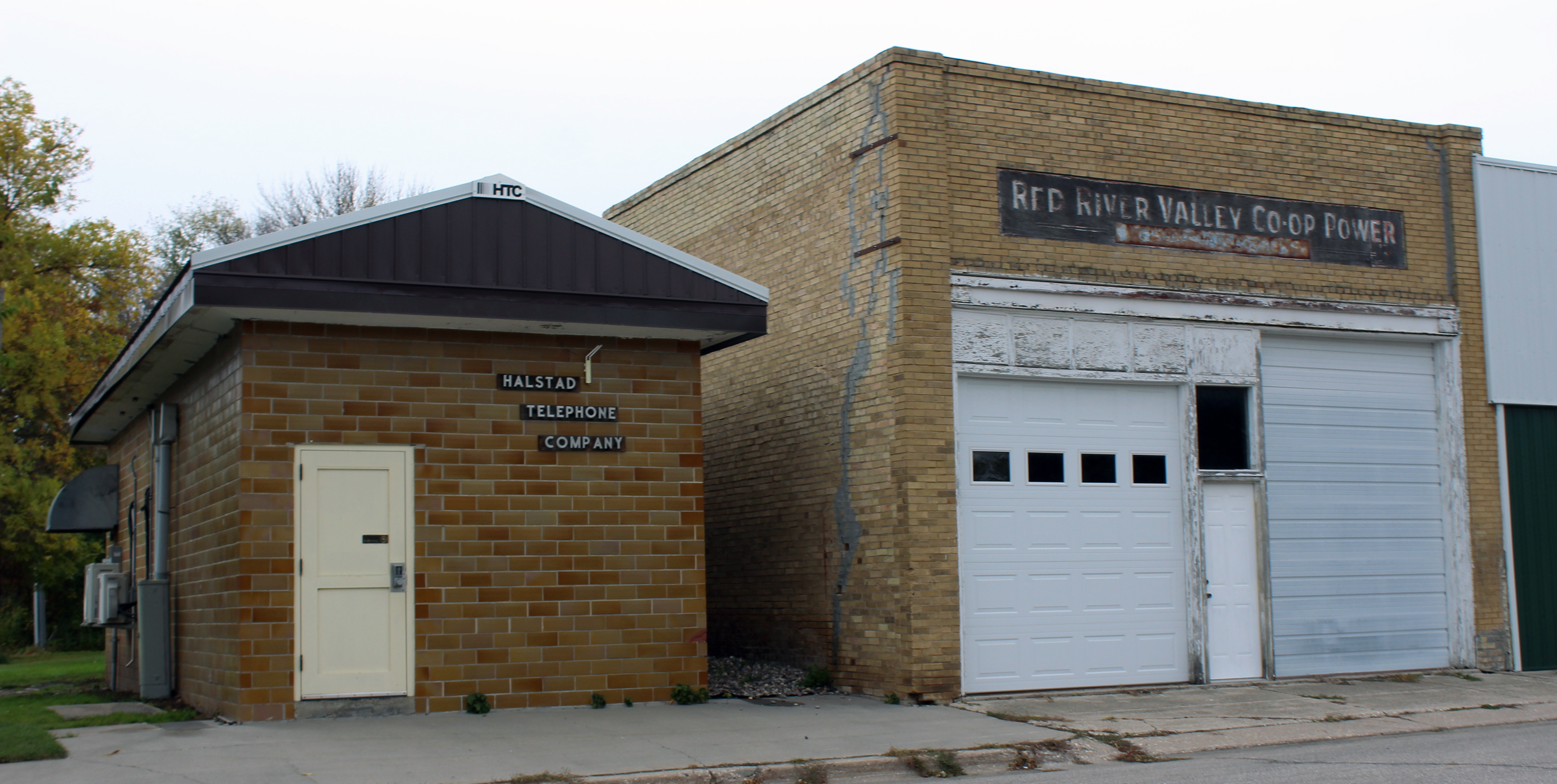
Halstad Telephone Company building and Red River Valley Co-op Power building
