= Tansem Township, Clay County, Minnesota =

Township in Minnesota, United States

Tansem Township
- Township
- Location of Tansem Township, within Clay County, Minnesota

- Location within the state of Minnesota Tansem Township (the United States)
- Coordinates: 46°39′15″N 96°13′30″W
- Country: United States
- State: Minnesota
- County: Clay

Area
  - Total: 36.1 sq mi (93.5 km^{2})
  - Land: 35.6 sq mi (92.2 km^{2})
  - Water: 0.50 sq mi (1.3 km^{2})
- Elevation: 1,329 ft (405 m)

Population (2020)
  - Total: 269
  - Density: 7.56/sq mi (2.92/km^{2})
- Time zone: UTC-6 (Central (CST))
  - Summer (DST): UTC-5 (CDT)
- FIPS code: 27-64192
- GNIS feature ID: 0665762

Tansem Township is a township in Clay County, Minnesota, United States. The population was 269 at the 2020 census.

Minnesota State Highways 32 and 34 are two of the main arterial routes in the township.

== History ==
Tansem Township was named for John O. Tansem, a Norwegian immigrant and pioneer farmer.

== Geography ==
According to the United States Census Bureau, the township has a total area of 36.1 square miles (93.5 km^{2}), of which 35.6 square miles (92.2 km^{2}) is land and 0.5 square mile (1.3 km^{2}) (1.44%) is water.

== Demographics ==
As of the census of 2000, there were 222 people, 79 households, and 71 families residing in the township. The population density was 6.2 people per square mile (2.4/km^{2}). There were 93 housing units at an average density of 2.6/sq mi (1.0/km^{2}). The racial makeup of the township was 98.20% White, 0.45% African American, 0.90% from other races, and 0.45% from two or more races. Hispanic or Latino of any race were 0.90% of the population.

There were 79 households, out of which 39.2% had children under the age of 18 living with them, 82.3% were married couples living together, 3.8% had a female householder with no husband present, and 8.9% were non-families. 7.6% of all households were made up of individuals, and 3.8% had someone living alone who was 65 years of age or older. The average household size was 2.81 and the average family size was 2.96.

In the township the population was spread out, with 28.8% under the age of 18, 3.2% from 18 to 24, 32.4% from 25 to 44, 22.1% from 45 to 64, and 13.5% who were 65 years of age or older. The median age was 38 years. For every 100 females, there were 101.8 males. For every 100 females age 18 and over, there were 107.9 males.

The median income for a household in the township was $43,750, and the median income for a family was $45,000. Males had a median income of $35,833 versus $28,750 for females. The per capita income for the township was $18,917. About 9.8% of families and 16.2% of the population were below the poverty line, including 37.7% of those under the age of eighteen and 5.6% of those 65 or over.
