= Urbain Cote Round Barn =

Historic barn in North Dakota, United States

- U.S. National Register of Historic Places
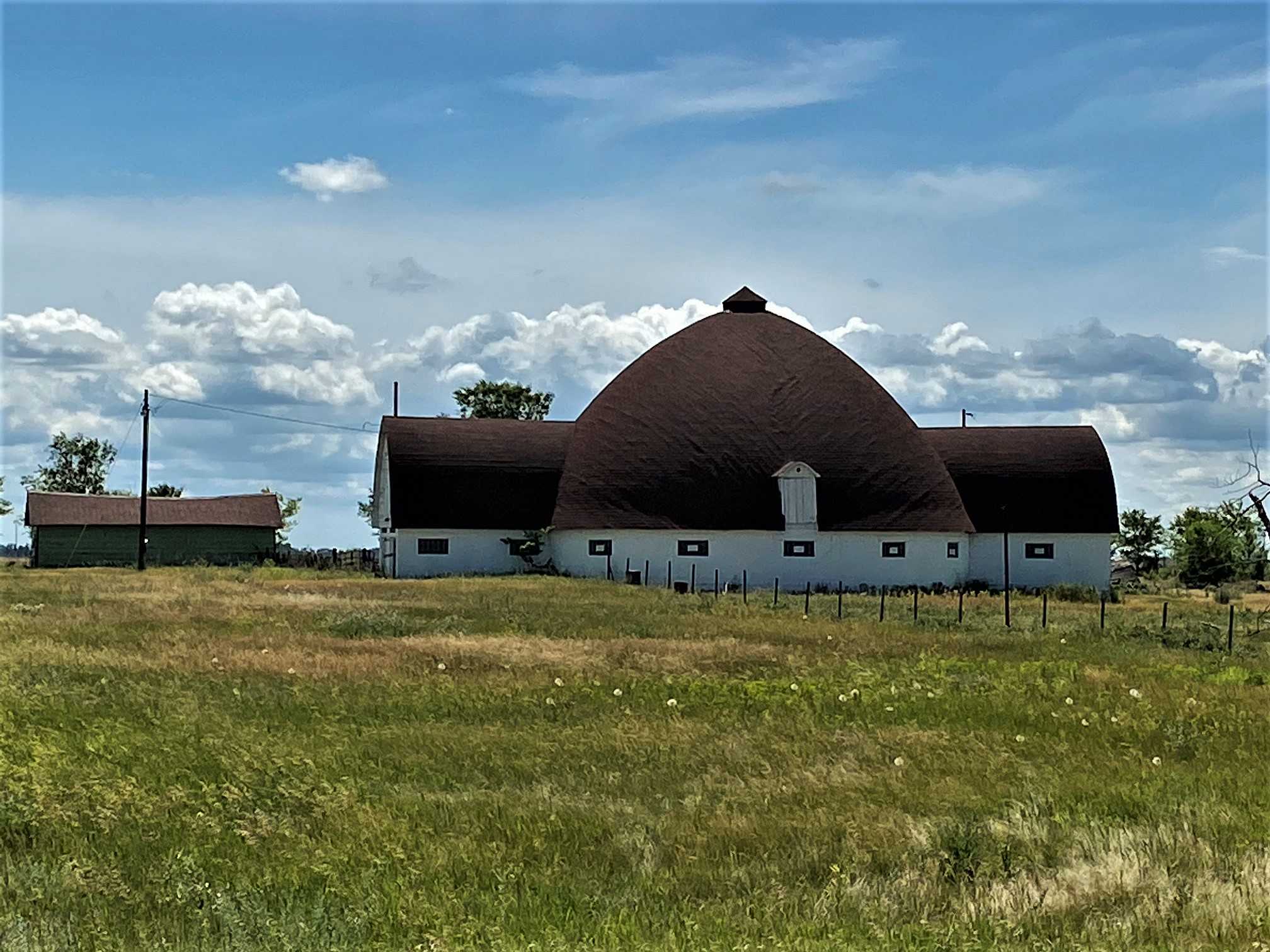

- Location within North Dakota Location within the United States
- Nearest city: Dunseith, North Dakota
- Coordinates: 47°38′40″N 100°3′30″W
- Area: less than one acre
- Built: 1943
- Built by: Cote, Urbain
- Architectural style: Round barn
- MPS: North Dakota Round Barns TR
- NRHP reference No.: 86002755
- Added to NRHP: October 7, 1986

The Urbain Cote Round Barn near Dunseith, North Dakota, United States, is a round barn that was built in 1943. It was listed on the National Register of Historic Places in 1986.

== History ==
The owners, the Cote family, were French-Canadian immigrants from Eastern Canada who immigrated and purchased the farm in 1943 and built the barn the same year. In the years before World War II, the Cotes specialized in barn construction; they modeled the barn after the Levi Glick Round Barn in Surrey, 100 miles southwest of Dunseith. The Glick barn was built in 1923 with hollow clay tile walls and a central silo.

The Cotes Barn was constructed of masonry walls, "double mow floor, gracious stairway, decorative shingling, lack of interior silo, and opposing dormers for ventillation." It is significant due to its dual use of housing cattle on the first floor and dances on the second. Its hay loft floor has "double floor boards, an unusual expenditure of materials in hay loft floors. The barn was used by roller skaters during the 1950s and shows little wear or sagging." The Cotes were reportedly so proud of the barn, they shingled the domed roof with eight different colors of shingles.

In a 1976 State Historical Society of North Dakota survey, the barn was identified as the only surviving barn of its type. A 1986 survey about round barn locations found it to be the barn "most frequently mentioned". In 2000, the State Historical Society of North Dakota and the National Park Service provided a grant to restore and re-shingle the roof and restore the barn doors.
