= Kempton, North Dakota =

- Unincorporated community
- Location within the state of North Dakota Kempton (the United States)
- Coordinates: 47°49′08″N 97°36′51″W
- Country: United States
- State: North Dakota
- County: Grand Forks
- Township: Avon
- Elevation: 1,125 ft (343 m)
- Time zone: UTC-6 (Central (CST))
  - Summer (DST): UTC-5 (CDT)
- ZIP codes: 58267
- Area code: 701
- GNIS feature ID: 1029727

Kempton is an unincorporated community in Avon Township, Grand Forks County, North Dakota, United States. It is located northwest of Northwood. Kempton is the location of the Carlott Funseth Round Barn, which is listed on the National Register of Historic Places. A post office operated in Kempton from 1887 to 1963.
