= Cisco, Minnesota =

Cisco
- Unincorporated community
- Location within Minnesota Location within the United States
- Coordinates: 47°44′20″N 96°00′02″W
- Country: United States
- State: Minnesota
- County: Polk
- Time zone: UTC-6 (Central (CST))
  - Summer (DST): UTC-5 (CDT)
- Area code: 218

Cisco is a place name for the remnants of a former unincorporated community located along the Soo Line Railroad and US 59 in the northwestern quarter of Section 11 of Badger Township, 149 North, Range 42 West, in Polk County, Minnesota, United States, approximately four miles north of the city of Erskine, and about the same distance south of the city of Brooks.

Cisco was still in use as a place name by local people as late as 1990, but now is but a dim memory among some of the old-timers.

== History ==
Beginning with the construction of the railroad in the late 19th century until the late 1940s, Cisco was a water station and rail siding on the Soo Line Railroad. At one time, Cisco boasted a grain elevator, a stockyard, a general store and a school (District 146, commonly known as the Cisco School), in addition to the railroad facilities and several homes. After the demise of steam locomotion, the railroad no longer stopped in Cisco. By 1938, the elevator and stockyards had been torn down, the school had been consolidated and discontinued operations (the physical building having been moved to Marcoux Corner), and the store had closed forever. By 1983, Cisco had shrunk to a couple of houses, both of which remain standing in 2019. One of these was the former Cisco store. It is said that the grandchildren of the owners of the Cisco store live in the area and the stepmother lives in that home.
