= Shirley, Minnesota =

Shirley
- Unincorporated community
- Location within Minnesota Location within the United States
- Coordinates: 47°52′08″N 96°36′52″W
- Country: United States
- State: Minnesota
- County: Polk
- Elevation: 906 ft (276 m)
- Time zone: UTC-6 (Central (CST))
  - Summer (DST): UTC-5 (CDT)
- Area code: 218
- GNIS feature ID: 654939

Shirley is an unincorporated community in Polk County, in the U.S. state of Minnesota.

== History ==
Shirley had a depot on the Great Northern Railroad. Iron mining occurred in Shirley from 1882 to 1911.
