= Avon Township, Grand Forks County, North Dakota =

Avon Township, North Dakota
- Township
- Location within North Dakota
- Coordinates: 47°48′08″N 97°33′34″W
- Country: United States
- State: North Dakota
- Counties: Grand Forks

Area
  - Total: 35.87 sq mi (92.91 km^{2})
  - Land: 35.87 sq mi (92.91 km^{2})
  - Water: 0 sq mi (0.00 km^{2})
- Elevation: 1,122 ft (342 m)

Population (2020)
  - Total: 87
  - Density: 2.4/sq mi (0.94/km^{2})
- Time zone: UTC-6 (Central (CST))
  - Summer (DST): UTC-5 (CDT)
- ZIP codes: 58214 (Arvilla); 58267 (Northwood)
- Area code: 701
- FIPS code: 38-03940
- GNIS feature ID: 1036597

Avon Township is a township in Grand Forks County, North Dakota, United States. The population was 87 at the 2020 census.

The unincorporated community of Kempton lies within the township.

== Geography ==
Avon Township has a total area of 35.874 square miles (92.91 km^{2}), all land.
