= Fairfax Township, Polk County, Minnesota =

Fairfax Township, Minnesota
- Township
- Location of Fairfax Township, within Polk County, Minnesota
- Coordinates: 47°43′26″N 96°33′44″W
- Country: United States
- State: Minnesota
- County: Polk

Area
  - Total: 36.0 sq mi (93.2 km^{2})
  - Land: 36.0 sq mi (93.2 km^{2})
  - Water: 0 sq mi (0.0 km^{2})
- Elevation: 889 ft (271 m)

Population (2020)
  - Total: 160
  - Density: 4.4/sq mi (1.7/km^{2})
- Time zone: UTC-6 (Central (CST))
  - Summer (DST): UTC-5 (CDT)
- FIPS code: 27-20204
- GNIS feature ID: 0664128

Fairfax Township is a township in Polk County, Minnesota, United States. It is part of the Grand Forks-ND-MN Metropolitan Statistical Area. The population was 160 at the 2020 census.

Fairfax Township was organized in 1879.

== Geography ==
According to the United States Census Bureau, the township has a total area of 36.0 square miles (93 km^{2}), all land.

U.S. Highway 2 and Minnesota Highways 9 and 102 are three of the main routes in the community.

== Demographics ==
As of the census of 2000, there were 213 people, 74 households, and 54 families residing in the township. The population density was 5.9 inhabitants per square mile (2.3/km^{2}). There were 77 housing units at an average density of 2.1 per square mile (0.81/km^{2}). The racial makeup of the township was 98.12% White, 0.47% Native American, 0.94% from other races, and 0.47% from two or more races. Hispanic or Latino of any race were 0.94% of the population.

There were 74 households, out of which 37.8% had children under the age of 18 living with them, 62.2% were married couples living together, 6.8% had a female householder with no husband present, and 25.7% were non-families. 21.6% of all households were made up of individuals, and 5.4% had someone living alone who was 65 years of age or older. The average household size was 2.66 and the average family size was 3.09.

In the township the population was spread out, with 26.3% under the age of 18, 3.8% from 18 to 24, 31.0% from 25 to 44, 18.3% from 45 to 64, and 20.7% who were 65 years of age or older. The median age was 40 years. For every 100 females, there were 95.4 males. For every 100 females age 18 and over, there were 89.2 males.

The median income for a household in the township was $43,214, and the median income for a family was $44,250. Males had a median income of $30,357 versus $26,875 for females. The per capita income for the township was $15,402. About 14.5% of families and 22.2% of the population were below the poverty line, including 29.3% of those under the age of eighteen and 21.6% of those 65 or over.
