= Mallory, Minnesota =

Mallory
- Unincorporated community
- Location within Minnesota Location within the United States
- Coordinates: 47°52′36″N 96°54′42″W
- Country: United States
- State: Minnesota
- County: Polk
- Elevation: 840 ft (260 m)
- Time zone: UTC-6 (Central (CST))
  - Summer (DST): UTC-5 (CDT)
- Area code: 218
- GNIS feature ID: 647412

Mallory is an unincorporated community in Polk County, in the U.S. state of Minnesota. Mallory is 830 feet [253 m] above sea level and lies in the Central Time Zone.

== History ==
A post office called Mallory was established in 1880, and remained in operation until 1916. The community was named for Charles P. Mallory, a local businessperson in the lumber industry.
