= Badger Township, Polk County, Minnesota =

Badger Township, Minnesota
- Township
- Location of Badger Township, within Polk County, Minnesota
- Coordinates: 47°42′22″N 96°1′12″W
- Country: United States
- State: Minnesota
- County: Polk

Area
  - Total: 36.1 sq mi (93.6 km^{2})
  - Land: 35.7 sq mi (92.4 km^{2})
  - Water: 0.46 sq mi (1.2 km^{2})
- Elevation: 1,175 ft (358 m)

Population (2020)
  - Total: 118
  - Density: 3.31/sq mi (1.28/km^{2})
- Time zone: UTC−6 (Central (CST))
  - Summer (DST): UTC−5 (CDT)
- FIPS code: 27-03142
- GNIS feature ID: 0663490

Badger Township is a township in Polk County, Minnesota, United States. It is part of the Grand Forks-ND-MN Metropolitan Statistical Area. Under the United States Public Land Survey System it is a survey township identified as Township 149 North, Range 42 West, Fifth Principal Meridian. The population was 118 at the 2020 census.

== Geography ==
Badger Township is located at the eastern edge of the Red River Valley. The township is located entirely within the drainage of the Clearwater River and its tributaries, which in turn flow into the Red Lake River, the Red River of the North, and on to Hudson Bay. Most of the township is part of the glacial moraine that formed the southeast shore of prehistoric Lake Agassiz. According to the United States Census Bureau, Badger Township has a total area of 36.2 square miles (94 km^{2}), of which 35.7 square miles (92 km^{2}) is land and 0.5 square miles (1.3 km^{2}) (1.33%) is water. It is located near geocoordinates 47.73N, 96.03W.

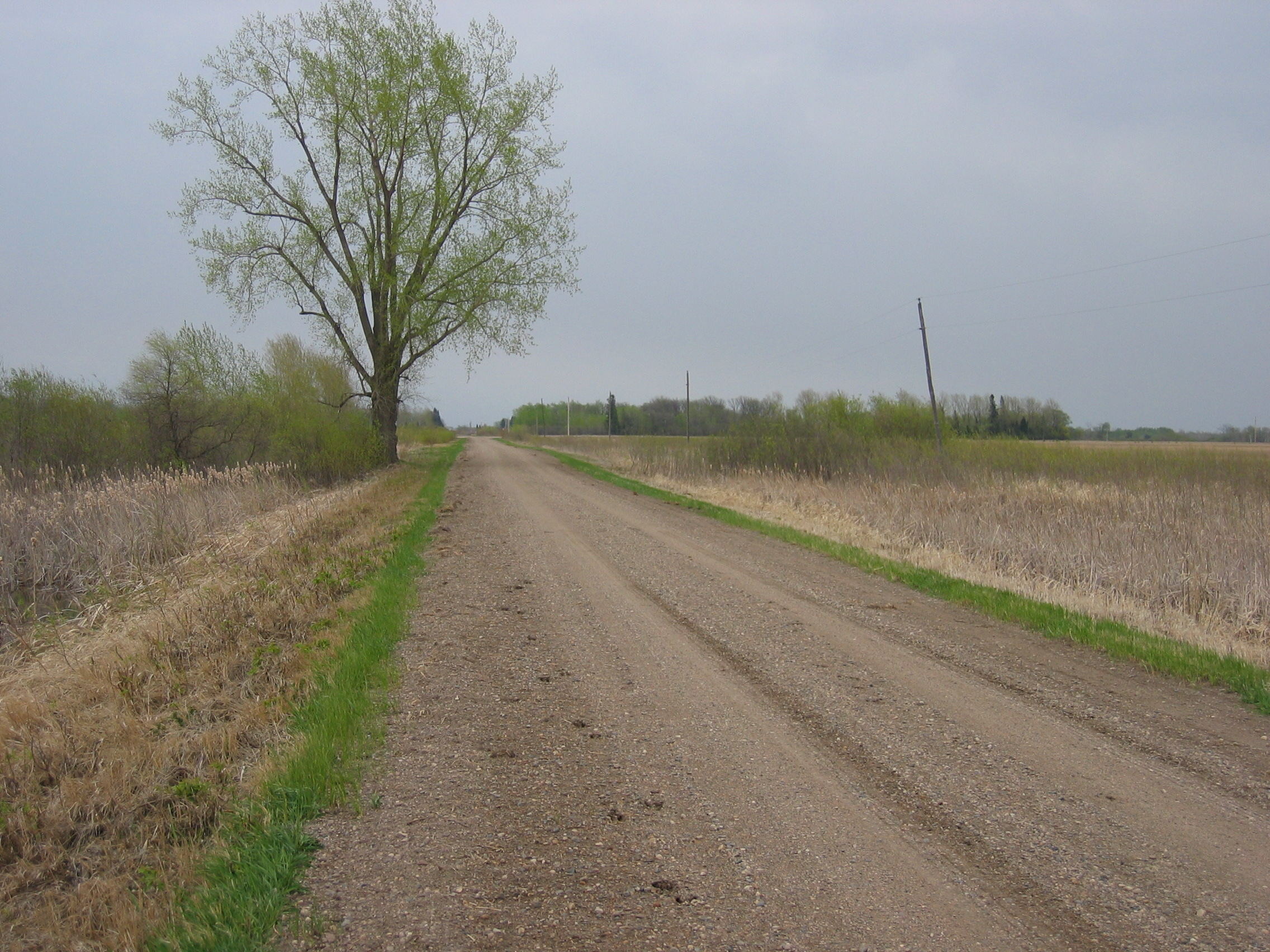
Roadside, Badger Township, May, 2007

== Demographics ==
=== Demographic trends ===
Badger Township is an area undergoing rural depopulation. The highest population shown by United States Census data was 448 in 1900. The population then dipped to 391 in 1910, rose back to 447 in 1920, and fell back to 350 in 1930. The population has been in decline ever since.

=== Current demographics (2000 Census) ===
As of the census of 2000, there were 166 people, 46 households, and 31 families residing in the township. The population density was 4.7 inhabitants per square mile (1.8/km^{2}). There were 57 housing units at an average density of 1.6 per square mile (0.62/km^{2}). The racial makeup of the township was 95.78% White, 3.01% Native American, and 1.20% from two or more races. Hispanic or Latino of any race were 3.01% of the population.

There were 46 households, out of which 32.6% had children under the age of 18 living with them, 56.5% were married couples living together, 4.3% had a female householder with no husband present, and 32.6% were non-families. 30.4% of all households were made up of individuals, and 10.9% had someone living alone who was 65 years of age or older. The average household size was 2.52 and the average family size was 3.10.

In the township the population was spread out, with 19.3% under the age of 18, 5.4% from 18 to 24, 17.5% from 25 to 44, 13.9% from 45 to 64, and 44.0% who were 65 years of age or older. The median age was 52 years. For every 100 females, there were 95.3 males. For every 100 females age 18 and over, there were 94.2 males.

Only 3 of the 166 people in Badger Township in 2000 (1.8%) were foreign born. Of those born in the United States, 95 were born in Minnesota, 52 were born elsewhere in the Midwest, 6 were born in the South, 2 were born in the West and 0 were born in the Northeast.

The median income for a household in the township was $25,625, and the median income for a family was $33,750. Males had a median income of $26,875 versus $25,417 for females. The per capita income for the township was $16,999. About 6.7% of families and 8.9% of the population were below the poverty line, including none of those under the age of eighteen and 6.1% of those 65 or over.

=== Early demographics (1900 Census) ===
As of the census of 1900, Badger Township had 448 people in 91 households, a density of 12.44 people per square mile, more than 2½ times as many people as in 2000. The population in 1900 was overwhelmingly Norwegian, with 72 heads of households (79.12%) having been born in Norway, 6 (6.59%) born in Sweden, 4 (4.40%) born in Wisconsin, 3 (3.30%) born in Denmark, 2 (2.20%) born in Minnesota, and 1 (1.10%) in each of Michigan, Illinois and Canada.

One hundred percent (100%) of the population in 1900 was reported as white. One family consisting of four individuals (4.40% of the township population) had a French surname (Dion) and another family from Wisconsin had a likely Yankee surname (Gundy). Other than these, every surname of residents in the township was obviously of Scandinavian origin. Of all residents in the township in 1900, 84 (17.21%) were born in the United States, and 404 (82.79%) were of foreign birth. Not a single resident of Badger Township in 1900 who had been born in the United States was born in a state other than Minnesota, Michigan, Illinois, Iowa, North Dakota or Wisconsin. The vast majority of these were born in Minnesota, most of them children.

A surprising number of those born in the United States but not in Minnesota (11, or 2.25% of the total population) were born in North Dakota, indicating that at least some of the families in Badger Township had initially traveled further west before settling (at least temporarily) in Minnesota. The rest had migrated directly from Scandinavia or from the immediately adjoining states in the Upper Midwest.

No persons of Native American descent were listed in the Census of 1900, nor were there any persons of Hispanic descent, Asian or Pacific Islander descent, or Black, Negro or African American descent. In 1900, the Census focused more upon ethnicity as defined by country of origin rather than racial background, but it is noteworthy that no residents of Badger Township in the Census of 1900 were of German, English, Slavic, Italian or Southern European descent.

== History ==
=== European occupancy and settlement ===
==== Pre-European contact ====
There were no permanent settlements in Badger Township prior to European settlement. The territory was traversed by occasional Ojibwe and Dakota hunting expeditions and may have been a seasonal food-gathering area for Ojibwe families, but was otherwise unpeopled until the mid-19th century. Indian artifacts, including grinding rocks, were excavated near Badger Creek in the SW 1/4 of Section 8 in the mid-1960s, indicating a periodic visitation pattern but no permanent residency. Bison roamed over Badger Township into the 1870s, and were actively pursued by Indians and Metis from the Pembina Settlements. Several bison skulls and skeletal remains thought to be over 2000 years old, as well as an Indian grinding rock, were unearthed in a peat bog by the Nikolayson family in Section 33 in the 1960s, and now are on display in the University of Minnesota in nearby Crookston.

==== Native land cessions and incorporation into United States territory ====
Badger Township is not connected with any verifiable native or European historic events or circumstances until transfer in the Treaty of Old Crossing (1863) and the Treaty of Old Crossing (1864), which included extensive other areas and involved no physical acts within the township. Prior to that time, the territory now included in Badger Township was within the watershed of the Red River Valley and hence technically a part of Rupert's Land and Assiniboia before becoming part of British Canada as a result of the boundary settlement in the Treaty of 1818, a which fixed the international border at the 49th parallel north from the Northwest Angle of Lake of the Woods westward to the Rocky Mountains.

==== Red River Trail ====
The easternmost Red River Trail between Pembina, North Dakota and St. Paul, Minnesota crossed the Red Lake River at Huot, Minnesota (the site of the Treaty of Old Crossing (1863)), which is a few miles northwest of Badger Township in what is now Red Lake County, Minnesota. The trail skirted the western edges of adjoining Grove Park-Tilden Township, Minnesota and Knute Township, Minnesota but is not generally considered to have crossed into the territory of Badger Township. (Since Red River ox cart trains used in trading expeditions between Pembina and St. Paul, Minnesota included many family members and hunters in addition to the oxcart drivers, they tended to spread out across the prairie except at key fords and crossings. It is likely that people in the trains entered what is now Badger Township many times before the extension of the railroad to Fargo, North Dakota put the Red River ox carts out of business in the early 1860s. Thereafter, while there is no specific record of its occupation prior to 1880, the history of the township is essentially indistinguishable from areas to the west, north and east in Northwest Minnesota).

==== Initial Euro-American settlement ====
Badger Township was traversed by trappers and traders, including Indians, Métis and other half-breed people as well as white men incidental to the fur trade between 1790 and 1870. In 1797, the North West Company established a fur trading post approximately 15 miles northwest of Badger Township at the confluence of the Red Lake River and the Clearwater River, near the current site of Red Lake Falls. The American Fur Company, the Hudson's Bay Company and several other fur trading companies had active trapping and trading operations throughout the Red River Valley and Red Lake region prior to 1858. After Minnesota statehood, although the area remained unsurveyed and closed to settlement, some squatters may have encroached into the territory of Badger Township as permanent settlers before 1880. The township was not opened for settlement until 1883, when as part of the "Thirteen Towns" of eastern Polk County it was finally surveyed as a township and made available for homestead under the Homestead Act. Most of the township was initially settled by Norwegian immigrants in the late 1880s. The subsequent history of Badger Township is virtually indistinguishable from that of most of Northern Minnesota. Virtually all of the land was homesteaded or sold as railroad land to farmers.

=== Current land use and occupancy ===
Badger Township is essentially agricultural in character, although a large percentage of it is of marginal quality with thin, sandy soils or swampland and potholed, essentially abandoned or unused for any cropland or pasturage purpose. As a result, much of the land is now included in wildlife management areas, including Kakaik State Wildlife Management Area, Erskine State Wildlife Management Area, and Polk State Wildlife Management Area, and much of the remainder of the township has been enrolled as CRP land.

== Business ==
Until recently, no active business enterprises were operating in Badger Township, excepting farming operations which are mostly family owned. A general store and railroad depot were in operation in Cisco until the late 1940s, and a few other home-operated family businesses may have had a fleeting existence, but none have endured. For example, the C.C. Spray Service operated between 1964 and 1966, providing Carbola whitewashing services to Grade A dairy farms throughout Northwestern Minnesota and Northeastern North Dakota. A large grain terminal, including a mile-long circular siding capable of holding a 110-car freight train, is now operating in Section 32 of Badger Township on the east side of along County Road 18, south of Highway 2 and the Great Northern Railway (BNSF). This facility, known as the Erskine Grain Terminal, was developed in 2006–2007 by the grain co-ops of Oklee, Newfolden and Winger to allow area growers to assemble trainloads of grain for direct shipment to market in order to meet current freight pricing policies of the railroads.

== Community organizations ==
There is no incorporated or unincorporated community of any size within Badger Township, although the former places known as Sletten and Cisco were located within its territory. The nearest towns are Erskine, Mentor and Brooks, all located outside the township. There are no stoplights and no paved roads (other than a state highway and a US highway which pass through the township's eastern and southern fringes). The township is managed by a town board which mainly provides for road grading. The only public building in the township is a town hall on the north side of Section 21. There are no school buildings although at one time there were several; the township now is served by Win-E-Mac School District, near Erskine. There is one historically active church (Saron Lutheran Church) and one new church (the brand new Old Believers Church on the southwest quarter of Section 17, built in 2003), within the township, and there are four cemeteries (one at Saron Lutheran Church, another on Section 32 known as the Broderheim cemetery, a third at the northeast corner of Section 17 known as Sorum Cemetery, and the fourth and newest just established on the southwest quarter of Section 17 by the Old Believers Church).

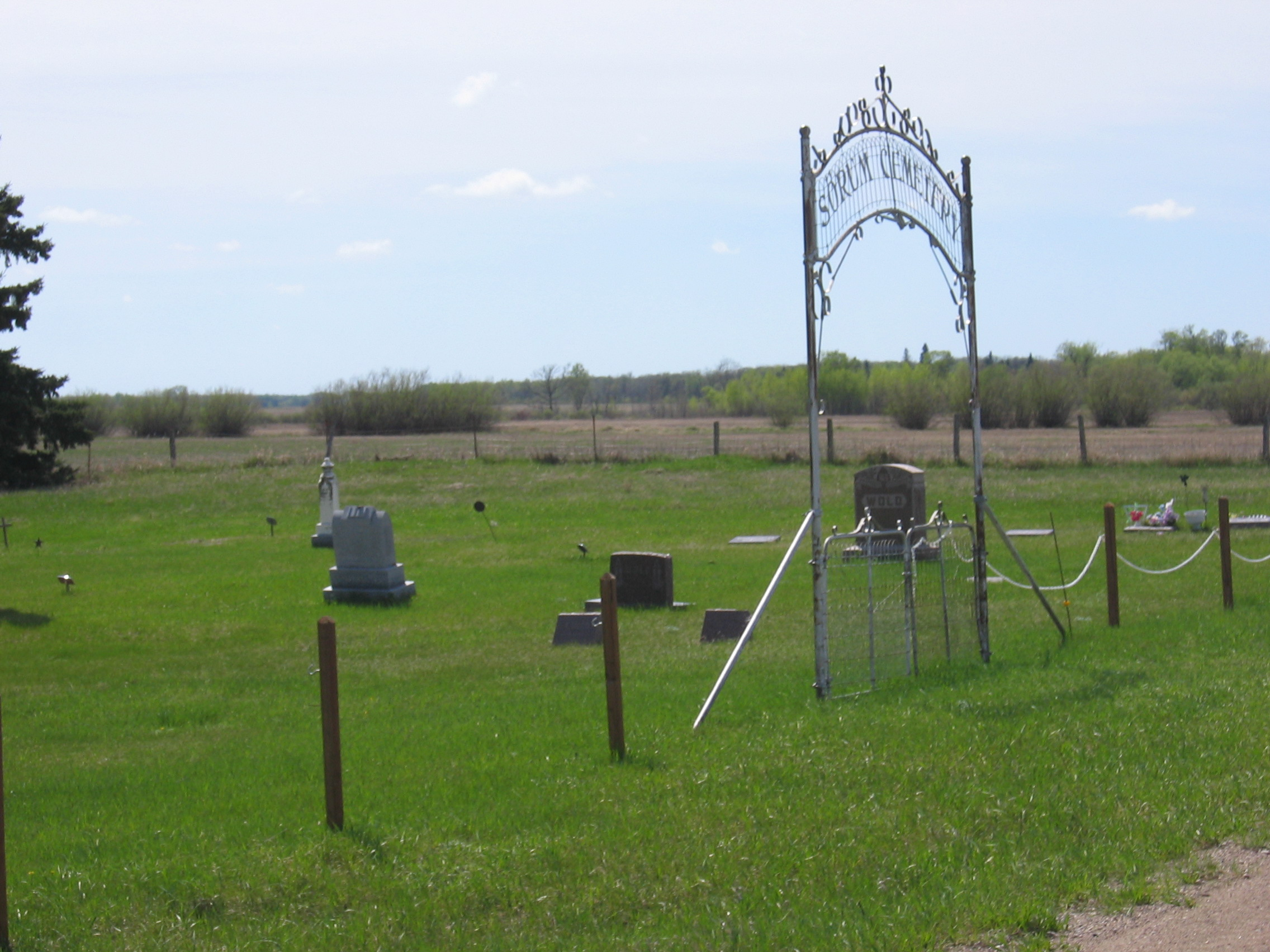
Sorum Cemetery Gate 2007
