= Onstad Township, Polk County, Minnesota =

Onstad Township, Minnesota
- Township
- Location of Onstad Township, within Polk County, Minnesota
- Coordinates: 47°38′14″N 96°22′38″W
- Country: United States
- State: Minnesota
- County: Polk

Area
  - Total: 35.7 sq mi (92.4 km^{2})
  - Land: 35.6 sq mi (92.1 km^{2})
  - Water: 0.12 sq mi (0.3 km^{2})
- Elevation: 1,020 ft (311 m)

Population (2020)
  - Total: 61
  - Density: 1.7/sq mi (0.66/km^{2})
- Time zone: UTC-6 (Central (CST))
  - Summer (DST): UTC-5 (CDT)
- FIPS code: 27-48418
- GNIS feature ID: 0665211

Onstad Township is a township in Polk County, Minnesota, United States. It is part of the Grand Forks-ND-MN Metropolitan Statistical Area. The population was 61 at the 2020 census.

Onstad Township was organized in 1882, and named for Ole P. Onstad, a Norwegian settler.

== Geography ==
According to the United States Census Bureau, the township has a total area of 35.7 square miles (92.4 km^{2}), of which 35.6 square miles (92.1 km^{2}) is land and 0.1 square mile (0.3 km^{2}) (0.31%) is water.

== Demographics ==
As of the census of 2000, there were 70 people, 26 households, and 21 families residing in the township. The population density was 2.0 people per square mile (0.8/km^{2}). There were 30 housing units at an average density of 0.8/sq mi (0.3/km^{2}). The racial makeup of the township was 97.14% White and 2.86% Asian.

There were 26 households, out of which 30.8% had children under the age of 18 living with them, 73.1% were married couples living together, 3.8% had a female householder with no husband present, and 15.4% were non-families. 15.4% of all households were made up of individuals, and 7.7% had someone living alone who was 65 years of age or older. The average household size was 2.69 and the average family size was 2.95.

In the township the population was spread out, with 25.7% under the age of 18, 8.6% from 18 to 24, 20.0% from 25 to 44, 37.1% from 45 to 64, and 8.6% who were 65 years of age or older. The median age was 39 years. For every 100 females, there were 118.8 males. For every 100 females age 18 and over, there were 108.0 males.

The median income for a household in the township was $43,125, and the median income for a family was $43,125. Males had a median income of $30,000 versus $21,250 for females. The per capita income for the township was $12,807. None of the population or the families were below the poverty line.
