= Garfield Township, Polk County, Minnesota =

Garfield Township, Minnesota
- Township
- Location of Garfield Township, within Polk County, Minnesota
- Coordinates: 47°32′28″N 96°15′53″W
- Country: United States
- State: Minnesota
- County: Polk

Area
  - Total: 33.9 sq mi (87.7 km^{2})
  - Land: 33.1 sq mi (85.8 km^{2})
  - Water: 0.77 sq mi (2.0 km^{2})
- Elevation: 1,142 ft (348 m)

Population (2020)
  - Total: 519
  - Density: 15.7/sq mi (6.05/km^{2})
- Time zone: UTC-6 (Central (CST))
  - Summer (DST): UTC-5 (CDT)
- FIPS code: 27-23156
- GNIS feature ID: 0664246

Garfield Township is a township in Polk County, Minnesota, United States. It is part of the Grand Forks-ND-MN Metropolitan Statistical Area. The population was 519 at the 2020 census.

Garfield Township was organized in 1880, and named for James A. Garfield (1831–1881), the 20th President of the United States.

== Geography ==
According to the United States Census Bureau, the township has a total area of 33.9 square miles (88 km^{2}), of which 33.1 square miles (86 km^{2}) is land and 0.8 square miles (2.1 km^{2}) (2.24%) is water.

== Demographics ==
As of the census of 2000, there were 391 people, 149 households, and 123 families residing in the township. The population density was 11.8 inhabitants per square mile (4.6/km^{2}). There were 167 housing units at an average density of 5.0 per square mile (1.9/km^{2}). The racial makeup of the township was 98.21% White, 1.28% Native American, and 0.51% from two or more races.

There were 149 households, out of which 34.9% had children under the age of 18 living with them, 75.2% were married couples living together, 6.0% had a female householder with no husband present, and 16.8% were non-families. 15.4% of all households were made up of individuals, and 7.4% had someone living alone who was 65 years of age or older. The average household size was 2.62 and the average family size was 2.94.

In the township the population was spread out, with 25.6% under the age of 18, 7.7% from 18 to 24, 26.1% from 25 to 44, 26.6% from 45 to 64, and 14.1% who were 65 years of age or older. The median age was 40 years. For every 100 females, there were 116.0 males. For every 100 females age 18 and over, there were 107.9 males.

The median income for a household in the township was $32,292, and the median income for a family was $35,833. Males had a median income of $27,813 versus $15,625 for females. The per capita income for the township was $15,760. About 7.6% of families and 9.7% of the population were below the poverty line, including 10.4% of those under age 18 and 10.0% of those age 65 or over.
