= Fertile, Minnesota =

City in Minnesota, United States

Fertile
- City
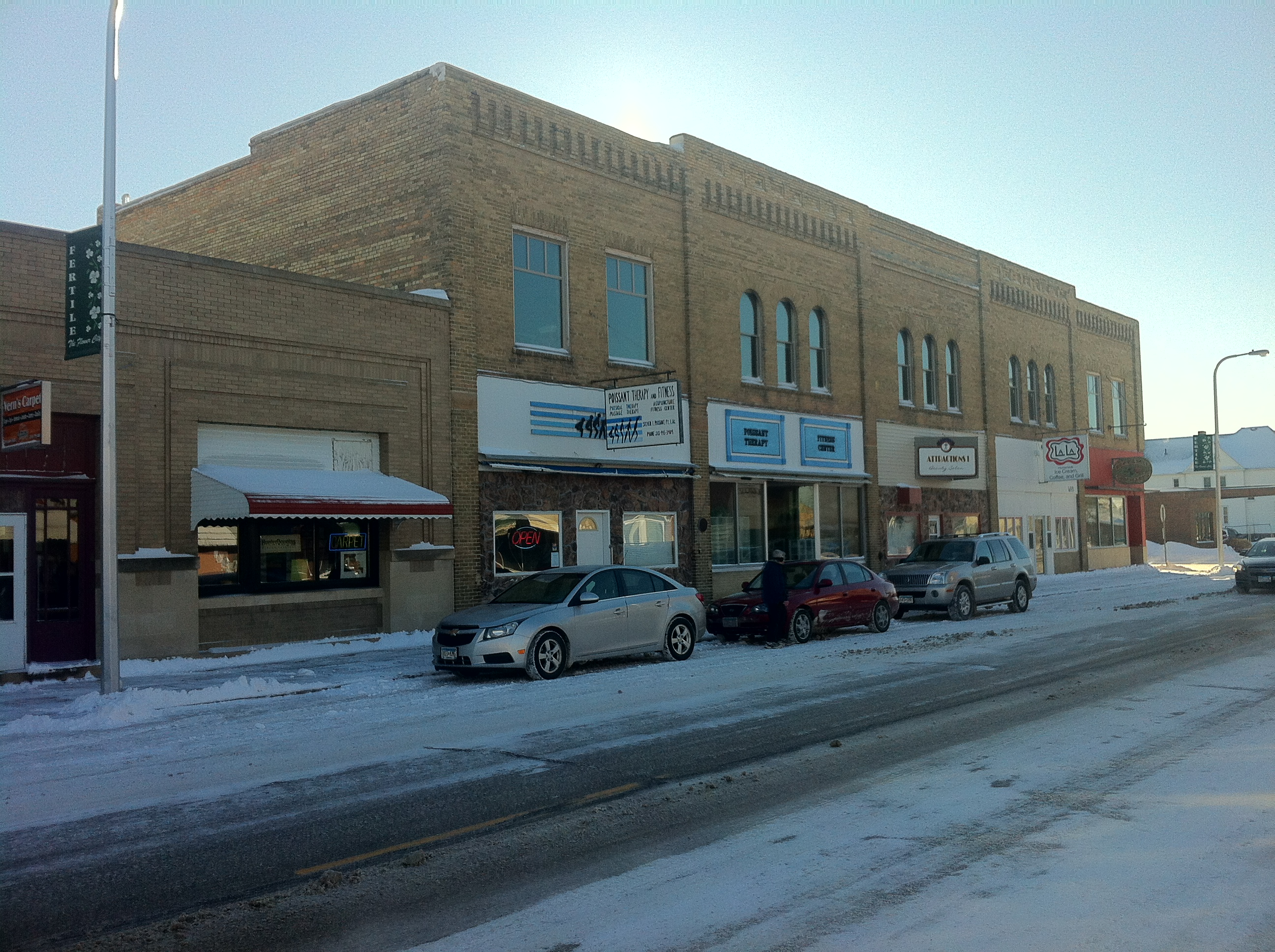
- Commercial Businesses on Mill Street
- Nickname: "The Flower City"
- Location of Fertile, Minnesota
- Coordinates: 47°32′04″N 96°16′54″W
- Country: United States
- State: Minnesota
- County: Polk

Area
  - Total: 2.08 sq mi (5.38 km^{2})
  - Land: 2.08 sq mi (5.38 km^{2})
  - Water: 0 sq mi (0.00 km^{2})
- Elevation: 1,135 ft (346 m)

Population (2020)
  - Total: 804
  - Estimate (2021): 788
  - Density: 387.3/sq mi (149.53/km^{2})
- Time zone: UTC-6 (CST)
  - Summer (DST): UTC-5 (CDT)
- ZIP code: 56540
- Area code: 218
- FIPS code: 27-20978
- GNIS feature ID: 2394761
- Website: www.fertilemn.gov

Fertile (/ˈfɜːrtɪl/ FUR-til) is a city in Polk County, Minnesota, United States. It is part of the Grand Forks ND-MN Metropolitan Statistical Area. The population was 804 at the 2020 census.

The annual Polk County Fair is held in Fertile and dates to 1900. This is Fertile's main attraction during the summer. It holds many competitions for crops, animals, and manmade items.

== History ==
A post office called Fertile has been in operation since 1881. The city was named after Fertile, Iowa, the former home of a share of the first settlers.

== Geography and climate ==
According to the United States Census Bureau, the city has an area of 2.13 square miles (5.52 km^{2}), all land. The area east, south, and southwest of Fertile is hilly while the area north and west is very flat and good for agriculture.

Fertile is home to the Fertile Sand Hills, sand dunes left behind by the ancient Lake Agassiz, which host several rare plants and insects. Lake Agassiz existed mostly in what is now Canada. The Fertile Sand Hills are Minnesota's only such dune field. Parts of the Sand Hills are protected in the Agassiz Dunes Scientific and Natural Area and the Fertile Sand Hills Wilderness Sanctuary and West Mill Recreation Area.

Minnesota State Highways 32 and Minnesota Highway 102 are two of the community's main routes. The Agassiz Recreational Trail, a 53-mile multi-use trail built on an abandoned railroad grade, passes through the city.

The city has a climate typical of a humid continental climate, with long, cold winters and warm, humid summers. The town averages 24 inches (610 mm) of rain and roughly 45 inches (1,100 mm) of snow each year. The record low is −46 °F (−43 °C) and the record high is 105 °F (41 °C). Because Fertile is near North America's geographic center, it experiences many types of weather.

== Economy ==
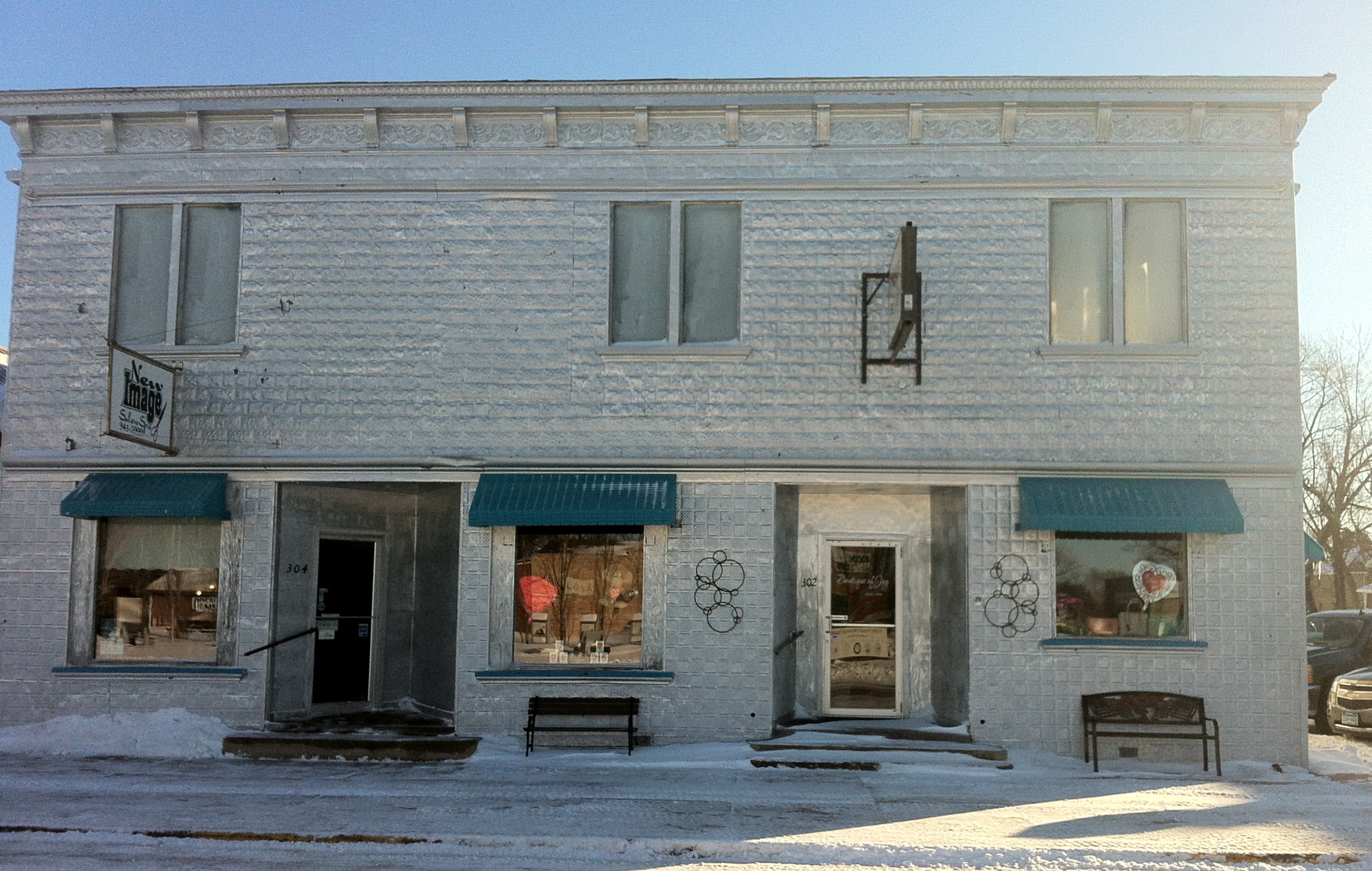
Business in Fertile

Fertile has sandy soil, which makes the area immediately around it poor farming land, as the soil dries out very easily. The areas east and west of town, however, are prime for corn, soybeans, wheat, sunflowers, oats, barley, sugar beets (to the west of Fertile), berries, hay, potatoes, vegetables, and much more. Livestock used to be a big area of agriculture for Fertile. Remaining livestock production is mainly beef cattle, with a few dairy farms.

Although not directly related to farming, another vital part of Fertile's economy is hunting and fishing. The area is prime for deer, waterfowl, small game and pheasant hunting, as well as multiple types of fishing in the area's many lakes.

=== Polk County Fair ===
Fertile has been home to the yearly Polk County Fair for over 110 years. This event is known to be family-friendly with free admission, many food stands, rides, a free stage and grandstand. The fairgrounds are east of Highway 32, providing easy access for the many visitors every year.

== Education ==
Fertile-Beltrami Public School is in Fertile at the intersection of Mill Street and Jefferson Avenue. The school is a K-12 grade building shared by Fertile and the smaller community of Beltrami, which is about 12 miles to the west. The school's team is the Fertile Falcons, which includes softball, baseball, basketball, volleyball, football, and golf.

Advance Com

Advance Com is a student-based web hosting service that creates and designs web pages for the community. It is managed by Year-3 computer students who "apply" and manage the school, and other websites that pay the business to update throughout the year. The business also takes on video editing jobs on occasion.

Knowledge Bowl

Knowledge Bowl is a question-based competition in Minnesota. The first round is a test taken by five team members to determine their ranking. The written round is usually followed by four oral rounds in which four team members participate. In 2011 the Fertile-Beltrami Knowledge Bowl went to the state competition for the first time.

== Demographics ==
Historical population
Census	Pop.	Note	%±
1890	273		—
1900	587		115.0%
1910	614		4.6%
1920	800		30.3%
1930	800		0.0%
1940	907		13.4%
1950	890		−1.9%
1960	968		8.8%
1970	955		−1.3%
1980	869		−9.0%
1990	859		−1.2%
2000	893		4.0%
2010	842		−5.7%
2020	804		−4.5%
2021 (est.)	788		−2.0%
U.S. Decennial Census; 2020 Census

=== 2010 census ===
As of the census of 2010, there were 842 people, 372 households, and 211 families living in the city. The population density was 395.3 inhabitants per square mile (152.6/km^{2}). There were 428 housing units at an average density of 200.9 per square mile (77.6/km^{2}). The racial makeup of the city was 97.1% White, 0.4% African American, 0.5% Native American, 0.4% Asian, 0.4% from other races, and 1.3% from two or more races. Hispanic or Latino people of any race were 1.3% of the population.

There were 372 households, of which 24.7% had children under age 18 living with them, 44.4% were married couples living together, 9.7% had a female householder with no husband present, 2.7% had a male householder with no wife present, and 43.3% were non-families. 39.5% of all households were made up of individuals, and 22.8% had someone living alone who was 65 or older. The average household size was 2.13 and the average family size was 2.90.

The median age in the city was 44.1. 23% of residents were under 18; 6.1% were between 18 and 24; 22.2% were from 25 to 44; 21.4% were from 45 to 64; and 27.2% were 65 or older. The gender makeup of the city was 46.4% male and 53.6% female.

=== 2000 census ===
As of the census of 2000, there were 893 people, 396 households, and 220 families living in the city. The population density was 471.9 inhabitants per square mile (182.2/km^{2}). There were 433 housing units at an average density of 228.8 per square mile (88.3/km^{2}). The racial makeup of the city was 97.20% White, 0.56% Native American, 0.34% Asian, 0.56% from other races, and 1.34% from two or more races. Hispanic or Latino people of any race were 1.34% of the population.

Fertile has the nation's second-highest percentage of residents claiming Norwegian ancestry, at 54.4%.

There were 396 households, of which 21.7% had children under 18 living with them, 45.7% were married couples living together, 8.3% had a female householder with no husband present, and 44.2% were non-families. 42.2% of all households were made up of individuals, and 29.3% had someone living alone who was 65 or older. The average household size was 2.08 and the average family size was 2.87.

In the city, the population was spread out, with 20.3% under 18, 4.8% from 18 to 24, 20.9% from 25 to 44, 16.1% from 45 to 64, and 37.8% who were 65 or older. The median age was 49. For every 100 females, there were 79.7 males. For every 100 females 18 and over, there were 72.8 males.

The median income for a household was $23,021, and the median income for a family was $30,192. Males had a median income of $27,344 versus $20,341 for females. The per capita income was $14,866. About 11.1% of families and 17.0% of the population were below the poverty line, including 35.4% of those under 18 and 9.0% of those 65 or older.
