= Grove Park-Tilden Township, Polk County, Minnesota =

Grove Park-Tilden Township, Minnesota
- Township
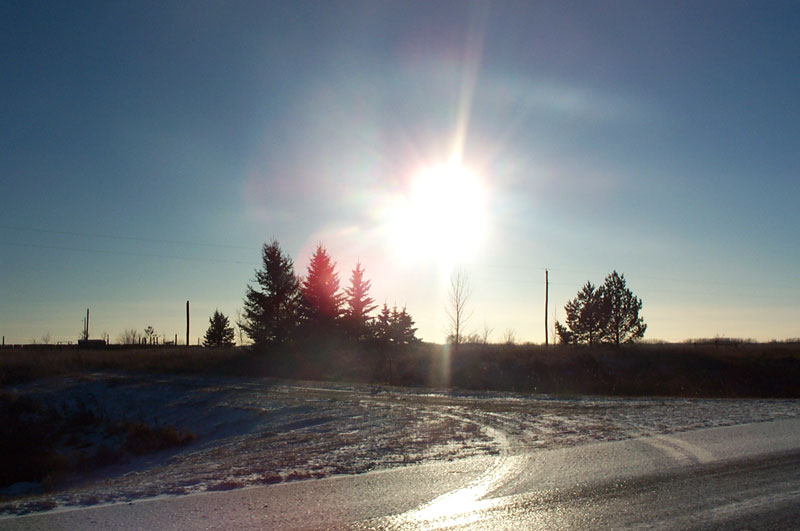
- Dugdale, a community in Grove Park–Tilden Township

- Location of Grove Park-Tilden Township, within Polk County, Minnesota
- Coordinates: 47°42′31″N 96°11′30″W
- Country: United States
- State: Minnesota
- County: Polk

Area
  - Total: 70.1 sq mi (181.5 km^{2})
  - Land: 69.3 sq mi (179.5 km^{2})
  - Water: 0.77 sq mi (2.0 km^{2})
- Elevation: 1,161 ft (354 m)

Population (2020)
  - Total: 257
  - Density: 3.71/sq mi (1.43/km^{2})
- Time zone: UTC-6 (Central (CST))
  - Summer (DST): UTC-5 (CDT)
- FIPS code: 27-26190
- GNIS feature ID: 1729757

Grove Park-Tilden Township is a township in Polk County, Minnesota, United States which surrounds the city of Mentor. The unincorporated community of Dugdale, and the location of Tilden Junction are located within the township, and the unincorporated community of Marcoux Corner is located at the edge of the township. It is part of the Grand Forks-ND-MN Metropolitan Statistical Area. The population was 257 at the 2020 census.

== History ==
Grove Park-Tilden township was formed in 1992 from the merger of Grove Park Township and Tilden Township. Grove Township was organized in 1880. Tilden Township was organized in 1882, and named for Samuel J. Tilden (1814–1886), candidate for President of the United States in 1876.

== Geography ==
According to the United States Census Bureau, the township has a total area of 70.1 square miles (182 km^{2}), of which 69.3 square miles (179 km^{2}) is land and 0.8 square miles (2.1 km^{2}) (1.11%) is water.

== Demographics ==
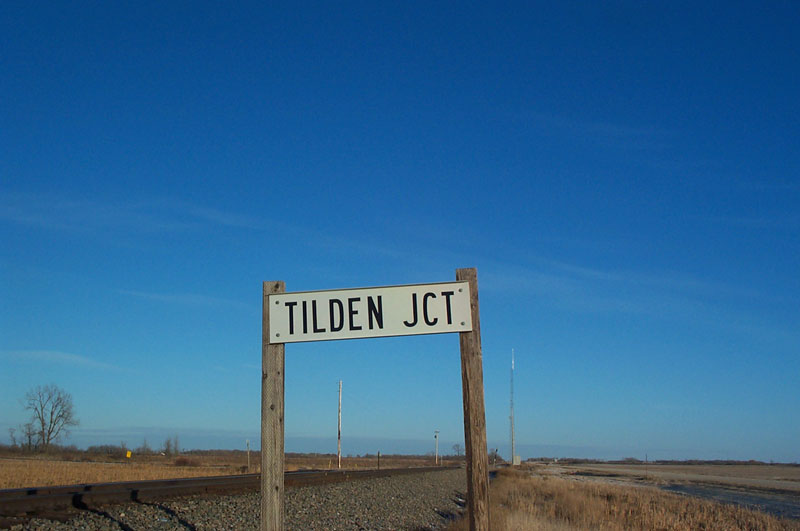
Tilden Junction, a location in the township

As of the census of 2000, there were 311 people, 119 households, and 89 families residing in the township. The population density was 4.5 inhabitants per square mile (1.7/km^{2}). There were 204 housing units at an average density of 2.9 per square mile (1.1/km^{2}). The racial makeup of the township was 98.07% White, 0.32% African American, 0.32% Native American, 0.64% Asian, and 0.64% from two or more races. Hispanic or Latino of any race were 0.64% of the population.

There were 119 households, out of which 32.8% had children under the age of 18 living with them, 63.9% were married couples living together, 5.9% had a female householder with no husband present, and 24.4% were non-families. 21.8% of all households were made up of individuals, and 12.6% had someone living alone who was 65 years of age or older. The average household size was 2.61 and the average family size was 2.93.

In the township the population was spread out, with 28.3% under the age of 18, 8.4% from 18 to 24, 18.3% from 25 to 44, 26.4% from 45 to 64, and 18.6% who were 65 years of age or older. The median age was 40 years. For every 100 females, there were 101.9 males. For every 100 females age 18 and over, there were 100.9 males.

The median income for a household in the township was $39,375, and the median income for a family was $41,250. Males had a median income of $29,286 versus $20,750 for females. The per capita income for the township was $16,342. None of the families and 0.6% of the population were living below the poverty line, including no under eighteens and none of those over 64.
