= Kertsonville Township, Polk County, Minnesota =

Kertsonville Township, Minnesota
- Township
- Location of Kertsonville Township, within Polk County, Minnesota
- Coordinates: 47°42′12″N 96°24′55″W
- Country: United States
- State: Minnesota
- County: Polk

Area
  - Total: 36.5 sq mi (94.6 km^{2})
  - Land: 36.5 sq mi (94.6 km^{2})
  - Water: 0 sq mi (0.0 km^{2})
- Elevation: 980 ft (300 m)

Population (2020)
  - Total: 90
  - Density: 2.5/sq mi (0.95/km^{2})
- Time zone: UTC-6 (Central (CST))
  - Summer (DST): UTC-5 (CDT)
- FIPS code: 27-32948
- GNIS feature ID: 0664622

Kertsonville Township is a township in Polk County, Minnesota, United States. It is part of the Grand Forks-ND-MN Metropolitan Statistical Area. The population was 90 at the 2020 census.

Kertsonville Township was organized in 1881.

== Geography ==
According to the United States Census Bureau, the township has a total area of 36.5 square miles (95 km^{2}), all land.

== Demographics ==
As of the census of 2000, there were 105 people, 39 households, and 32 families residing in the township. The population density was 2.9 inhabitants per square mile (1.1/km^{2}). There were 42 housing units at an average density of 1.1 per square mile (0.42/km^{2}). The racial makeup of the township was 99.05% White and 0.95% Native American. Hispanic or Latino of any race were 0.95% of the population.

There were 39 households, out of which 30.8% had children under the age of 18 living with them, 76.9% were married couples living together, 2.6% had a female householder with no husband present, and 15.4% were non-families. 12.8% of all households were made up of individuals, and 5.1% had someone living alone who was 65 years of age or older. The average household size was 2.69 and the average family size was 2.91.

In the township the population was spread out, with 21.9% under the age of 18, 5.7% from 18 to 24, 25.7% from 25 to 44, 30.5% from 45 to 64, and 16.2% who were 65 years of age or older. The median age was 44 years. For every 100 females, there were 110.0 males. For every 100 females age 18 and over, there were 95.2 males.

The median income for a household in the township was $64,000, and the median income for a family was $63,750. Males had a median income of $31,750 versus $21,250 for females. The per capita income for the township was $24,474. There were 6.1% of families and 3.9% of the population living below the poverty line, including no under eighteens and none of those over 64.
