= Godfrey Township =

Godfrey Township may refer to the following townships in the United States:

- Godfrey Township, Madison County, Illinois
- Godfrey Township, Polk County, Minnesota
