= Russia Township =

Russia Township may refer to:

- Russia Township, Polk County, Minnesota
- New Russia Township, Lorain County, Ohio
