= Northland Township, Minnesota =

Northland Township is the name of some places in the U.S. state of Minnesota:

- Northland Township, Polk County, Minnesota
- Northland Township, St. Louis County, Minnesota
