= Queen Township, Polk County, Minnesota =

Queen Township, Minnesota
- Township
- Location of Queen Township, within Polk County, Minnesota
- Coordinates: 47°38′41″N 95°37′41″W
- Country: United States
- State: Minnesota
- County: Polk

Area
  - Total: 36.6 sq mi (94.8 km^{2})
  - Land: 32.7 sq mi (84.8 km^{2})
  - Water: 3.9 sq mi (10.0 km^{2})
- Elevation: 1,306 ft (398 m)

Population (2020)
  - Total: 219
  - Density: 6.69/sq mi (2.58/km^{2})
- Time zone: UTC-6 (Central (CST))
  - Summer (DST): UTC-5 (CDT)
- FIPS code: 27-52774
- GNIS feature ID: 0665366

Queen Township is a township in Polk County, Minnesota, United States. It is part of the Grand Forks-ND-MN Metropolitan Statistical Area. The population was 219 at the 2020 census.

Queen Township was named in complement to nearby King Township.

== Geography ==
According to the United States Census Bureau, the township has a total area of 36.6 square miles (94.8 km^{2}), of which 32.7 square miles (84.8 km^{2}) is land and 3.9 square miles (10.0 km^{2}) (10.60%) is water.

== Demographics ==
As of the census of 2000, there were 198 people, 85 households, and 61 families residing in the township. The population density was 6.1 people per square mile (2.3/km^{2}). There were 120 housing units at an average density of 3.7/sq mi (1.4/km^{2}). The racial makeup of the township was 99.49% White and 0.51% Native American.

There were 85 households, out of which 23.5% had children under the age of 18 living with them, 64.7% were married couples living together, 3.5% had a female householder with no husband present, and 28.2% were non-families. 27.1% of all households were made up of individuals, and 12.9% had someone living alone who was 65 years of age or older. The average household size was 2.33 and the average family size was 2.82.

In the township the population was spread out, with 19.2% under the age of 18, 9.1% from 18 to 24, 22.2% from 25 to 44, 31.8% from 45 to 64, and 17.7% who were 65 years of age or older. The median age was 44 years. For every 100 females, there were 104.1 males. For every 100 females age 18 and over, there were 113.3 males.

The median income for a household in the township was $31,071, and the median income for a family was $48,000. Males had a median income of $31,250 versus $26,250 for females. The per capita income for the township was $18,046. About 3.8% of families and 9.6% of the population were below the poverty line, including none of those under the age of eighteen and 33.3% of those sixty five or over.
