= Brandt Township, Polk County, Minnesota =

Brandt Township, Minnesota
- Township
- Location of Brandt Township, within Polk County, Minnesota
- Coordinates: 48°3′54″N 96°35′54″W
- Country: United States
- State: Minnesota
- County: Polk

Area
  - Total: 36.0 sq mi (93.3 km^{2})
  - Land: 36.0 sq mi (93.3 km^{2})
  - Water: 0 sq mi (0.0 km^{2})
- Elevation: 938 ft (286 m)

Population (2020)
  - Total: 45
  - Density: 1.2/sq mi (0.48/km^{2})
- Time zone: UTC-6 (Central (CST))
  - Summer (DST): UTC-5 (CDT)
- FIPS code: 27-07408
- GNIS feature ID: 0663655

Brandt Township is a township in Polk County, Minnesota, United States. The population was 45 according to the 2020 census. It is part of the Grand Forks-ND-MN Metropolitan Statistical Area.

== Geography ==
The township is located near geocoordinates 48.04N, 96.565W. According to the United States Census Bureau, the township has a total area of 36.0 square miles (93 km^{2}), all land.

== Demographics ==
At the 2020 census, there were 45 people, 25 households and 31 families residing in the township. The population density was 1.7 per square mile (0.66/km^{2}). There were 29 housing units at an average density of 0.8 per square mile (0.31/km^{2}). The racial make-up of the township was 95.16% White, 4.84% from other races. Hispanic or Latino of any race were 4.84% of the population.

There were 25 households, of which 23.1% had children under the age of 18 living with them, 73.1% were married couples living together, 7.7% had a female householder with no husband present and 19.2% were non-families. 19.2% of all households were made up of individuals, and 15.4% had someone living alone who was 65 years of age or older. The average household size was 2.38 and the average family size was 2.71.

15.5% of the population were under the age of 18, 13.3% from 18 to 24, 11.1% from 25 to 44, 31.1% from 45 to 64 and 35.5% were 65 years of age or older. The median age was 60 years. For every 100 females, there were 106.7 males. For every 100 females age 18 and over, there were 84.6 males.

The median household income was $29,583 and the median family income was $.42,813. Males had a median income of $14,167 and females $17,917. The per capita income was $13,030. There were 5.6% of the population living below the poverty line, including 13.6% of those over 64.
