= Esther Township, Polk County, Minnesota =

Esther Township, Minnesota
- Township
- Location of Esther Township, within Polk County, Minnesota
- Coordinates: 48°3′19″N 97°3′6″W
- Country: United States
- State: Minnesota
- County: Polk

Area
  - Total: 19.4 sq mi (50.2 km^{2})
  - Land: 19.2 sq mi (49.6 km^{2})
  - Water: 0.23 sq mi (0.6 km^{2})
- Elevation: 817 ft (249 m)

Population (2020)
  - Total: 148
  - Density: 7.73/sq mi (2.98/km^{2})
- Time zone: UTC-6 (Central (CST))
  - Summer (DST): UTC-5 (CDT)
- FIPS code: 27-19790
- GNIS feature ID: 0664111

Esther Township is a township in Polk County, Minnesota, United States. It is part of the Grand Forks-ND-MN Metropolitan Statistical Area. The population was 148 at the 2020 census.

Esther Township was named for Esther Cleveland, daughter of Grover and Frances Cleveland.

== Geography ==
According to the United States Census Bureau, the township has a total area of 19.4 square miles (50 km^{2}), of which 19.1 square miles (49 km^{2}) is land and 0.2 square miles (0.52 km^{2}) (1.24%) is water.

== Demographics ==
As of the census of 2000, there were 158 people, 59 households, and 45 families residing in the township. The population density was 8.3 inhabitants per square mile (3.2/km^{2}). There were 63 housing units at an average density of 3.3 per square mile (1.3/km^{2}). The racial makeup of the township was 99.37% White and 0.63% African American.

There were 59 households, out of which 27.1% had children under the age of 18 living with them, 69.5% were married couples living together, 1.7% had a female householder with no husband present, and 23.7% were non-families. 20.3% of all households were made up of individuals, and 5.1% had someone living alone who was 65 years of age or older. The average household size was 2.68 and the average family size was 3.07.

In the township the population was spread out, with 21.5% under the age of 18, 7.6% from 18 to 24, 25.3% from 25 to 44, 29.1% from 45 to 64, and 16.5% who were 65 years of age or older. The median age was 40 years. For every 100 females, there were 125.7 males. For every 100 females age 18 and over, there were 138.5 males.

The median income for a household in the township was $46,563, and the median income for a family was $55,625. Males had a median income of $25,938 versus $15,625 for females. The per capita income for the township was $20,997. About 7.0% of families and 8.6% of the population were below the poverty line, including 13.3% of those under the age of eighteen and none of those 65 or over.
