= Euclid, Minnesota =

Euclid
- Unincorporated community
- Location within Minnesota Location within the United States
- Coordinates: 47°58′19″N 96°38′20″W
- Country: United States
- State: Minnesota
- County: Polk

Area
  - Total: 35.6 sq mi (92 km^{2})
  - Land: 35.6 sq mi (92 km^{2})
  - Water: 0 sq mi (0 km^{2})
- Elevation: 892 ft (272 m)

Population
  - Total: 132
  - Density: 3.7/sq mi (1.4/km^{2})
- Time zone: UTC-6 (Central (CST))
  - Summer (DST): UTC-5 (CDT)
- ZIP code: 56722
- Area code: 218
- GNIS feature ID: 643426

Euclid (/ˈjuːklɪd/ YOO-klid) is an unincorporated community in Polk County, Minnesota, United States. It is situated on U.S. Route 75, 13.5 miles (21.7 km) north of Crookston. Euclid has a post office with ZIP code 56722.

== History ==
A post office called Euclid has been in operation since 1879. The community was named after Euclid Avenue, a main boulevard of Cleveland, Ohio.

== Population ==
Historical population
Census	Pop.	Note	%±
1880	67		—
1990	184		—
2000	149		−19.0%
2010	148		−0.7%
U.S. Decennial Census

Euclid has a population of 132, of whom 54.5% are male and 45.5% female. The average age is estimated at 48.5. There are two main ethnicities, white and Hispanic, which are respectively 97% and 3% of the population. The average number of residents per household is estimated at 2.32, with an estimated 57 households in the area.
