= Liberty Township, Polk County, Minnesota =

Liberty Township, Minnesota
- Township
- Location of Liberty Township, within Polk County, Minnesota
- Coordinates: 47°32′9″N 96°23′5″W
- Country: United States
- State: Minnesota
- County: Polk

Area
  - Total: 36.1 sq mi (93.5 km^{2})
  - Land: 36.1 sq mi (93.4 km^{2})
  - Water: 0.039 sq mi (0.1 km^{2})
- Elevation: 1,007 ft (307 m)

Population (2020)
  - Total: 113
  - Density: 3.13/sq mi (1.21/km^{2})
- Time zone: UTC-6 (Central (CST))
  - Summer (DST): UTC-5 (CDT)
- FIPS code: 27-36962
- GNIS feature ID: 0664777

Liberty Township is a township in Polk County, Minnesota, United States. It is part of the Grand Forks-ND-MN Metropolitan Statistical Area. The population was 113 at the 2020 census.

Liberty Township was erected in 1880.

== Geography ==
According to the United States Census Bureau, the township has a total area of 36.1 square miles (93.5 km^{2}), of which 36.1 square miles (93.4 km^{2}) is land and 0.04 square mile (0.1 km^{2}) (0.08%) is water.

== Demographics ==
At the 2000 census there were 144 people, 51 households, and 42 families in the township. The population density was 4.0 people per square mile (1.5/km^{2}). There were 54 housing units at an average density of 1.5/sq mi (0.6/km^{2}). The racial makeup of the township was 99.31% White, and 0.69% from two or more races. Hispanic or Latino of any race were 5.56%.

Of the 51 households 37.3% had children under the age of 18 living with them, 70.6% were married couples living together, 5.9% had a female householder with no husband present, and 17.6% were non-families. 17.6% of households were one person and 11.8% were one person aged 65 or older. The average household size was 2.82 and the average family size was 3.19.

The age distribution was 33.3% under the age of 18, 4.2% from 18 to 24, 24.3% from 25 to 44, 22.9% from 45 to 64, and 15.3% 65 or older. The median age was 37 years. For every 100 females, there were 102.8 males. For every 100 females age 18 and over, there were 113.3 males.

The median household income was $31,250 and the median family income was $32,813. Males had a median income of $25,357 versus $27,500 for females. The per capita income for the township was $28,938. There were 7.7% of families and 9.1% of the population living below the poverty line, including 4.0% of under eighteens and 13.6% of those over 64.
