= Trail, Minnesota =

City in Minnesota, United States

- City
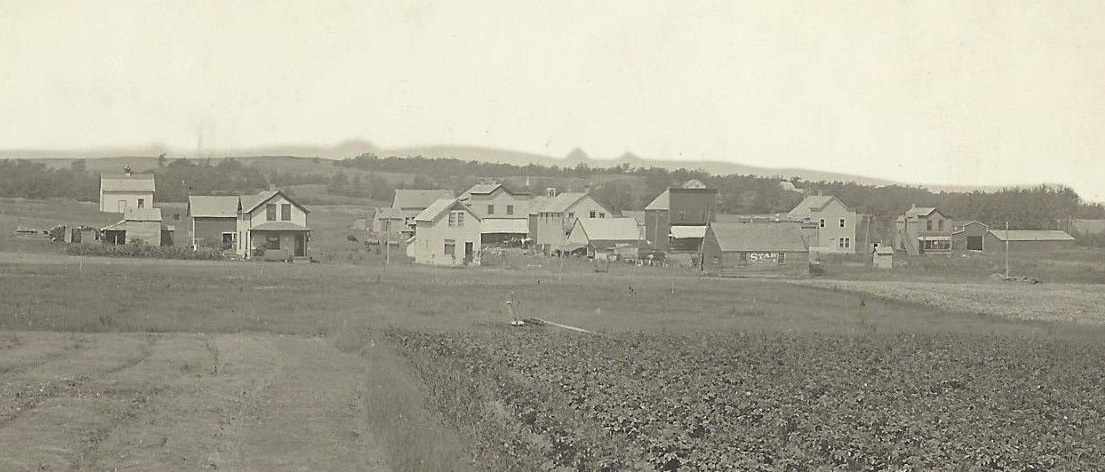
- 1915 postcard of Trail, Minnesota

- Location of Trail, Minnesota
- Coordinates: 47°47′00″N 95°41′53″W
- Country: United States
- State: Minnesota
- County: Polk
- Incorporated: April 17, 1950

Government
  - Mayor: Frank Buer

Area
  - Total: 0.998 sq mi (2.586 km^{2})
  - Land: 0.998 sq mi (2.586 km^{2})
  - Water: 0 sq mi (0.000 km^{2})
- Elevation: 1,207 ft (368 m)

Population (2020)
  - Total: 40
  - Estimate (2022): 39
  - Density: 40.1/sq mi (15.47/km^{2})
- Time zone: UTC−6 (Central (CST))
  - Summer (DST): UTC−5 (CDT)
- ZIP Code: 56684
- Area code: 218
- FIPS code: 27-65344
- GNIS feature ID: 2397047
- Sales tax: 7.125%

Trail is a city in Polk County, Minnesota, United States. It is part of the Grand Forks, ND-MN Metropolitan Statistical Area. The population was 40 at the 2020 census.

== History ==
A post office called Trail has been in operation since 1910. An Indian trail passed near the original town site, hence the name Trail.

== Geography ==
According to the United States Census Bureau, the city has a total area of 0.998 square miles (2.58 km^{2}), all land.

Trail is along State Highway 92 (MN 92).

== Demographics ==
Historical population
Census	Pop.	Note	%±
1960	100		—
1970	99		−1.0%
1980	97		−2.0%
1990	77		−20.6%
2000	62		−19.5%
2010	46		−25.8%
2020	40		−13.0%
2022 (est.)	39		−2.5%
U.S. Decennial Census; 2020 Census

=== 2010 census ===
As of the 2010 census, there were 46 people, 26 households, and 12 families living in the city. The population density was 46.5 inhabitants per square mile (18.0/km^{2}). There were 36 housing units at an average density of 36.4 per square mile (14.1/km^{2}). The racial makeup of the city was 100.0% White.

There were 26 households, of which 7.7% had children under the age of 18 living with them, 34.6% were married couples living together, 7.7% had a female householder with no husband present, 3.8% had a male householder with no wife present, and 53.8% were non-families. 46.2% of all households were made up of individuals, and 19.2% had someone living alone who was 65 years of age or older. The average household size was 1.77 and the average family size was 2.42.

The median age in the city was 52.5 years. 6.5% of residents were under the age of 18; 17.3% were between the ages of 18 and 24; 10.9% were from 25 to 44; 50% were from 45 to 64; and 15.2% were 65 years of age or older. The gender makeup of the city was 56.5% male and 43.5% female.

=== 2000 census ===
As of the 2000 census, there were 62 people, 26 households, and 13 families living in the city. The population density was 62.4 inhabitants per square mile (24.1/km^{2}). There were 35 housing units at an average density of 35.3 per square mile (13.6/km^{2}). The racial makeup of the city was 95.16% White, 1.61% Native American, 1.61% from other races, and 1.61% from two or more races. Hispanic or Latino of any race were 1.61% of the population.

There were 26 households, out of which 30.8% had children under the age of 18 living with them, 30.8% were married couples living together, 11.5% had a female householder with no husband present, and 50.0% were non-families. 38.5% of all households were made up of individuals, and 19.2% had someone living alone who was 65 years of age or older. The average household size was 2.38 and the average family size was 3.23.

In the city, the population was spread out, with 30.6% under the age of 18, 6.5% from 18 to 24, 30.6% from 25 to 44, 21.0% from 45 to 64, and 11.3% who were 65 years of age or older. The median age was 36 years. For every 100 females, there were 158.3 males. For every 100 females age 18 and over, there were 152.9 males.

The median income for a household in the city was $30,000, and the median income for a family was $36,250. Males had a median income of $35,833 versus $33,750 for females. The per capita income for the city was $16,211. There were 20.0% of families and 22.2% of the population living below the poverty line, including no under eighteens and 22.2% of those over 64.
