= Bygland Township, Polk County, Minnesota =

Bygland Township, Minnesota
- Township
- Location of Bygland Township, within Polk County, Minnesota
- Coordinates: 47°48′43″N 96°55′47″W
- Country: United States
- State: Minnesota
- County: Polk

Area
  - Total: 28.1 sq mi (72.9 km^{2})
  - Land: 28.1 sq mi (72.9 km^{2})
  - Water: 0 sq mi (0.0 km^{2})
- Elevation: 843 ft (257 m)

Population (2020)
  - Total: 258
  - Density: 9.17/sq mi (3.54/km^{2})
- Time zone: UTC-6 (Central (CST))
  - Summer (DST): UTC-5 (CDT)
- FIPS code: 27-09118
- GNIS feature ID: 0663719

Bygland Township is a township in Polk County, Minnesota, United States. The population was 258 at the 2020 census. It is part of the Grand Forks-ND-MN Metropolitan Statistical Area.

== History ==
Bygland Township was organized in 1877, and named after Bygland Municipality, Norway.

== Geography ==
According to the United States Census Bureau, the township has a total area of 28.2 square miles (73 km^{2}), all land.

== Demographics ==
As of the census of 2000, there were 297 people, 106 households, and 83 families residing in the township. The population density was 10.5 inhabitants per square mile (4.1/km^{2}). There were 109 housing units at an average density of 3.9 per square mile (1.5/km^{2}). The racial makeup of the township was 97.64% White, 0.34% African American, 0.67% Native American, and 1.35% from two or more races. Hispanic or Latino of any race were 1.01% of the population.

There were 106 households, out of which 34.0% had children under the age of 18 living with them, 69.8% were married couples living together, 4.7% had a female householder with no husband present, and 20.8% were non-families. 16.0% of all households were made up of individuals, and 2.8% had someone living alone who was 65 years of age or older. The average household size was 2.80 and the average family size was 3.13.

In the township the population was spread out, with 27.3% under the age of 18, 7.7% from 18 to 24, 31.0% from 25 to 44, 24.2% from 45 to 64, and 9.8% who were 65 years of age or older. The median age was 36 years. For every 100 females, there were 132.0 males. For every 100 females age 18 and over, there were 125.0 males.

The median income for a household in the township was $47,500, and the median income for a family was $49,107. Males had a median income of $40,208 versus $22,500 for females. The per capita income for the township was $18,260. About 9.2% of families and 11.0% of the population were below the poverty line, including 8.3% of those under the age of eighteen and none of those 65 or over.
