= Tabor Township, Polk County, Minnesota =

Tabor Township, Minnesota
- Township
- Location of Tabor Township, within Polk County, Minnesota
- Coordinates: 48°3′26″N 96°49′21″W
- Country: United States
- State: Minnesota
- County: Polk

Area
  - Total: 36.3 sq mi (93.9 km^{2})
  - Land: 36.3 sq mi (93.9 km^{2})
  - Water: 0 sq mi (0.0 km^{2})
- Elevation: 846 ft (258 m)

Population (2020)
  - Total: 115
  - Density: 3.17/sq mi (1.22/km^{2})
- Time zone: UTC-6 (Central (CST))
  - Summer (DST): UTC-5 (CDT)
- FIPS code: 27-64030
- GNIS feature ID: 0665758

Tabor Township is a township in Polk County, Minnesota, United States. It is part of the Grand Forks-ND-MN Metropolitan Statistical Area. The population was 115 at the 2020 census.

Tabor Township was named after Tábor (German: Tabor), in the Czech Republic.

== Geography ==
According to the United States Census Bureau, the township has a total area of 36.2 square miles (93.9 km^{2}), all land.

== Demographics ==
As of the census of 2000, there were 122 people, 47 households, and 35 families residing in the township. The population density was 3.4 people per square mile (1.3/km^{2}). There were 51 housing units at an average density of 1.4/sq mi (0.5/km^{2}). The racial makeup of the township was 93.44% White, 0.82% African American, 5.74% from other races. Hispanic or Latino of any race were 5.74% of the population.

There were 47 households, out of which 25.5% had children under the age of 18 living with them, 68.1% were married couples living together, 2.1% had a female householder with no husband present, and 25.5% were non-families. 21.3% of all households were made up of individuals, and 10.6% had someone living alone who was 65 years of age or older. The average household size was 2.60 and the average family size was 3.09.

In the township the population was 21.3% under the age of 18, 8.2% from 18 to 24, 27.9% from 25 to 44, 23.0% from 45 to 64, and 19.7% who were 65 years of age or older. The median age was 39 years. For every 100 females, there were 117.9 males. For every 100 females age 18 and over, there were 108.7 males.

The median income for a household in the township was $51,875, and the median income for a family was $58,750. Males had a median income of $38,036 versus $20,625 for females. The per capita income for the township was $19,429. None of the population or the families were below the poverty line.
