= Crookston Township, Polk County, Minnesota =

Crookston Township, Minnesota
- Township
- Location of Crookston Township, within Polk County, Minnesota
- Coordinates: 47°47′48″N 96°32′9″W
- Country: United States
- State: Minnesota
- County: Polk

Area
  - Total: 37.6 sq mi (97.4 km^{2})
  - Land: 37.6 sq mi (97.3 km^{2})
  - Water: 0.039 sq mi (0.1 km^{2})
- Elevation: 925 ft (282 m)

Population (2020)
  - Total: 441
  - Density: 11.7/sq mi (4.53/km^{2})
- Time zone: UTC-6 (Central (CST))
  - Summer (DST): UTC-5 (CDT)
- ZIP code: 56716
- Area code: 218
- FIPS code: 27-13888
- GNIS feature ID: 0663894
- Website: http://www.crookstontownship.com/

Crookston Township is a township in Polk County, Minnesota, United States. It is part of the Grand Forks-ND-MN Metropolitan Statistical Area. The population was 441 at the 2020 census.

== History ==
Crookston Township was erected in 1876. The township was named for Col. William Crooks, an early settler.

== Geography ==
According to the United States Census Bureau, the township has a total area of 30 square miles (78 km^{2}), of which 30 square miles (78 km^{2}) is land and 0.04 square miles (0.10 km^{2}) (0.08%) is water.

== Demographics ==
As of the census of 2000, there were 554 people, 148 households, and 128 families residing in the township. The population density was 14.7 inhabitants per square mile (5.7/km^{2}). There were 156 housing units at an average density of 4.2 per square mile (1.6/km^{2}). The racial makeup of the township was 98.56% White, 0.72% African American, 0.18% Native American and 0.54% Asian. Hispanic or Latino of any race were 1.08% of the population.

There were 148 households, out of which 45.3% had children under the age of 18 living with them, 79.7% were married couples living together, 4.1% had a female householder with no husband present, and 13.5% were non-families. 11.5% of all households were made up of individuals, and 2.7% had someone living alone who was 65 years of age or older. The average household size was 2.99 and the average family size was 3.25.

In the township the population was spread out, with 24.2% under the age of 18, 9.4% from 18 to 24, 23.8% from 25 to 44, 22.2% from 45 to 64, and 20.4% who were 65 years of age or older. The median age was 41 years. For every 100 females, there were 100.7 males. For every 100 females age 18 and over, there were 96.3 males.

The median income for a household in the township was $54,688, and the median income for a family was $61,875. Males had a median income of $38,750 versus $30,694 for females. The per capita income for the township was $19,664. About 5.4% of families and 6.7% of the population were below the poverty line, including 9.2% of those under age 18 and none of those age 65 or over.
