= Sletten Township, Polk County, Minnesota =

Sletten Township, Minnesota
- Township
- Location of Sletten Township, within Polk County, Minnesota
- Coordinates: 47°33′20″N 95°51′52″W
- Country: United States
- State: Minnesota
- County: Polk

Area
  - Total: 36.1 sq mi (93.5 km^{2})
  - Land: 36.0 sq mi (93.2 km^{2})
  - Water: 0.12 sq mi (0.3 km^{2})
- Elevation: 1,237 ft (377 m)

Population (2020)
  - Total: 200
  - Density: 5.6/sq mi (2.1/km^{2})
- Time zone: UTC-6 (Central (CST))
  - Summer (DST): UTC-5 (CDT)
- FIPS code: 27-60880
- GNIS feature ID: 0665634

Sletten Township is a township in Polk County, Minnesota, United States. It is part of the Grand Forks-ND-MN Metropolitan Statistical Area. The population was 200 at the 2020 census.

Sletten Township was named for Paul C. Sletten, a land agent.

== Geography ==
According to the United States Census Bureau, the township has a total area of 36.1 square miles (93.5 km^{2}), of which 36.0 square miles (93.2 km^{2}) is land and 0.1 square mile (0.3 km^{2}) (0.33%) is water.

== Demographics ==
As of the census of 2000, there were 140 people, 58 households, and 44 families residing in the township. The population density was 3.9 people per square mile (1.5/km^{2}). There were 68 housing units at an average density of 1.9/sq mi (0.7/km^{2}). The racial makeup of the township was 99.29% White and 0.71% Native American.

There were 58 households, out of which 29.3% had children under the age of 18 living with them, 62.1% were married couples living together, 3.4% had a female householder with no husband present, and 24.1% were non-families. 24.1% of all households were made up of individuals, and 12.1% had someone living alone who was 65 years of age or older. The average household size was 2.41 and the average family size was 2.82.

In the township the population was spread out, with 21.4% under the age of 18, 5.7% from 18 to 24, 24.3% from 25 to 44, 33.6% from 45 to 64, and 15.0% who were 65 years of age or older. The median age was 44 years. For every 100 females, there were 125.8 males. For every 100 females age 18 and over, there were 115.7 males.

The median income for a household in the township was $35,313, and the median income for a family was $42,083. Males had a median income of $26,875 versus $8,750 for females. The per capita income for the township was $29,178. There were 8.6% of families and 8.0% of the population living below the poverty line, including no under eighteens and none of those over 64.
