= Brandsvold Township, Polk County, Minnesota =

Brandsvold Township, Minnesota
- Township
- Location of Brandsvold Township, within Polk County, Minnesota
- Coordinates: 47°37′23″N 95°44′33″W
- Country: United States
- State: Minnesota
- County: Polk

Area
  - Total: 35.4 sq mi (91.6 km^{2})
  - Land: 34.5 sq mi (89.3 km^{2})
  - Water: 0.93 sq mi (2.4 km^{2})
- Elevation: 1,368 ft (417 m)

Population (2020)
  - Total: 253
  - Density: 7.34/sq mi (2.83/km^{2})
- Time zone: UTC-6 (Central (CST))
  - Summer (DST): UTC-5 (CDT)
- FIPS code: 27-07390
- GNIS feature ID: 0663654

Brandsvold Township is a township in Polk County, Minnesota, United States. The population was 253 at the 2020 census. It is part of the Grand Forks-ND-MN Metropolitan Statistical Area.

Brandsvold Township was named for a Norwegian settler.

== Geography ==
Brandsvold Township is located near geocoordinates 47.65N, 95.745W. According to the United States Census Bureau, the township has a total area of 35.4 square miles (92 km^{2}), of which 34.5 square miles (89 km^{2}) is land and 0.9 square miles (2.3 km^{2}) (2.60%) is water.

== Demographics ==
As of the census of 2000, there were 241 people, 95 households, and 77 families residing in the township. The population density was 7.0 inhabitants per square mile (2.7/km^{2}). There were 104 housing units at an average density of 3.0 per square mile (1.2/km^{2}). The racial makeup of the township was 97.93% White, 0.83% Asian, and 1.24% from two or more races.

There were 95 households, out of which 31.6% had children under the age of 18 living with them, 75.8% were married couples living together, 3.2% had a female householder with no husband present, and 18.9% were non-families. 18.9% of all households were made up of individuals, and 11.6% had someone living alone who was 65 years of age or older. The average household size was 2.54 and the average family size was 2.88.

In the township the population was spread out, with 25.3% under the age of 18, 4.1% from 18 to 24, 20.7% from 25 to 44, 35.3% from 45 to 64, and 14.5% who were 65 years of age or older. The median age was 45 years. For every 100 females, there were 115.2 males. For every 100 females age 18 and over, there were 104.5 males.

The median income for a household in the township was $39,000, and the median income for a family was $44,063. Males had a median income of $26,875 versus $21,429 for females. The per capita income for the township was $15,094. About 5.8% of families and 9.8% of the population were below the poverty line, including 11.1% of those under the age of eighteen and 19.4% of those 65 or over.
