= Keystone Township, Polk County, Minnesota =

Keystone Township, Minnesota
- Township
- Location of Keystone Township, within Polk County, Minnesota
- Coordinates: 47°58′15″N 96°47′41″W
- Country: United States
- State: Minnesota
- County: Polk

Area
  - Total: 35.6 sq mi (92.3 km^{2})
  - Land: 35.6 sq mi (92.3 km^{2})
  - Water: 0 sq mi (0.0 km^{2})
- Elevation: 850 ft (259 m)

Population (2020)
  - Total: 70
  - Density: 2.0/sq mi (0.76/km^{2})
- Time zone: UTC-6 (Central (CST))
  - Summer (DST): UTC-5 (CDT)
- FIPS code: 27-33002
- GNIS feature ID: 0664625

Keystone Township is a township in Polk County, Minnesota, United States. It is part of the Grand Forks-ND-MN Metropolitan Statistical Area. The population was 70 at the 2020 census.

Keystone Township was organized in 1881, and took its name from the Keystone state: Pennsylvania.

== Geography ==
According to the United States Census Bureau, the township has a total area of 35.6 square miles (92 km^{2}), all land.

== Demographics ==
As of the census of 2000, there were 100 people, 34 households, and 24 families residing in the township. The population density was 2.8 inhabitants per square mile (1.1/km^{2}). There were 38 housing units at an average density of 1.1 per square mile (0.42/km^{2}). The racial makeup of the township was 98.00% White, 1.00% Native American, and 1.00% from two or more races.

There were 34 households, out of which 38.2% had children under the age of 18 living with them, 67.6% were married couples living together, 5.9% had a female householder with no husband present, and 26.5% were non-families. 17.6% of all households were made up of individuals, and 5.9% had someone living alone who was 65 years of age or older. The average household size was 2.94 and the average family size was 3.48.

In the township the population was spread out, with 31.0% under the age of 18, 6.0% from 18 to 24, 31.0% from 25 to 44, 19.0% from 45 to 64, and 13.0% who were 65 years of age or older. The median age was 38 years. For every 100 females, there were 122.2 males. For every 100 females age 18 and over, there were 115.6 males.

The median income for a household in the township was $33,438, and the median income for a family was $40,625. Males had a median income of $27,917 versus $18,750 for females. The per capita income for the township was $15,645. There were no families and 6.1% of the population living below the poverty line, including no under eighteens and none of those over 64.
