= Winger Township, Polk County, Minnesota =

Winger Township, Minnesota
- Township
- Location of Winger Township, within Polk County, Minnesota
- Coordinates: 47°33′8″N 96°0′31″W
- Country: United States
- State: Minnesota
- County: Polk

Area
  - Total: 35.6 sq mi (92.3 km^{2})
  - Land: 35.1 sq mi (91.0 km^{2})
  - Water: 0.50 sq mi (1.3 km^{2})
- Elevation: 1,230 ft (375 m)

Population (2020)
  - Total: 195
  - Density: 5.55/sq mi (2.14/km^{2})
- Time zone: UTC-6 (Central (CST))
  - Summer (DST): UTC-5 (CDT)
- ZIP code: 56592
- Area code: 218
- FIPS code: 27-70888
- GNIS feature ID: 0666019

Winger Township is a township in Polk County, Minnesota, United States. It is part of the Grand Forks-ND-MN Metropolitan Statistical Area. The population was 195 at the 2020 census.

The township was named after a place called Winger, in Norway.

== Geography ==
According to the United States Census Bureau, the township has a total area of 35.6 square miles (92.3 km^{2}), of which 35.1 square miles (91.0 km^{2}) is land and 0.5 square mile (1.3 km^{2}) (1.38%) is water.

== Demographics ==
As of the census of 2000, there were 177 people, 67 households, and 48 families residing in the township. The population density was 5.0 people per square mile (1.9/km^{2}). There were 81 housing units at an average density of 2.3/sq mi (0.9/km^{2}). The racial makeup of the township was 96.61% White, 2.82% Native American, and 0.56% from two or more races.

There were 67 households, out of which 31.3% had children under the age of 18 living with them, 59.7% were married couples living together, 7.5% had a female householder with no husband present, and 26.9% were non-families. 19.4% of all households were made up of individuals, and 7.5% had someone living alone who was 65 years of age or older. The average household size was 2.64 and the average family size was 3.06.

In the township the population was spread out, with 29.4% under the age of 18, 5.1% from 18 to 24, 22.0% from 25 to 44, 28.2% from 45 to 64, and 15.3% who were 65 years of age or older. The median age was 38 years. For every 100 females, there were 90.3 males. For every 100 females age 18 and over, there were 104.9 males.

The median income for a household in the township was $34,583, and the median income for a family was $36,250. Males had a median income of $23,125 versus $28,125 for females. The per capita income for the township was $13,028. About 13.0% of families and 11.6% of the population were below the poverty line, including none of those under the age of eighteen and 6.7% of those 65 or over.
