= Fisher Township, Polk County, Minnesota =

Fisher Township, Minnesota
- Township
- Location of Fisher Township, within Polk County, Minnesota
- Coordinates: 47°48′18″N 96°47′58″W
- Country: United States
- State: Minnesota
- County: Polk

Area
  - Total: 35.6 sq mi (92.1 km^{2})
  - Land: 35.6 sq mi (92.1 km^{2})
  - Water: 0 sq mi (0.0 km^{2})
- Elevation: 833 ft (254 m)

Population (2020)
  - Total: 189
  - Density: 5.31/sq mi (2.05/km^{2})
- Time zone: UTC-6 (Central (CST))
  - Summer (DST): UTC-5 (CDT)
- ZIP code: 56723
- Area code: 218
- FIPS code: 27-21176
- GNIS feature ID: 0664171

Fisher Township is a township in Polk County, Minnesota, United States. It is part of the Grand Forks-ND-MN Metropolitan Statistical Area. The population was 189 at the 2020 census.

Fisher Township was organized in 1876. The township took its name from a riverboat landing named for William H. Fisher, a railroad official.

== Geography ==
According to the United States Census Bureau, the township has a total area of 35.6 square miles (92 km^{2}), all land.

== Demographics ==
As of the census of 2000, there were 219 people, 69 households, and 58 families residing in the township. The population density was 6.2 inhabitants per square mile (2.4/km^{2}). There were 73 housing units at an average density of 2.1 per square mile (0.81/km^{2}). The racial makeup of the township was 97.26% White, 1.37% Native American, 1.37% from other races. Hispanic or Latino of any race were 4.11% of the population.

There were 69 households, out of which 50.7% had children under the age of 18 living with them, 75.4% were married couples living together, 4.3% had a female householder with no husband present, and 14.5% were non-families. 14.5% of all households were made up of individuals, and 7.2% had someone living alone who was 65 years of age or older. The average household size was 3.17 and the average family size was 3.51.

In the township the population was spread out, with 35.2% under the age of 18, 5.9% from 18 to 24, 32.9% from 25 to 44, 18.7% from 45 to 64, and 7.3% who were 65 years of age or older. The median age was 35 years. For every 100 females, there were 104.7 males. For every 100 females age 18 and over, there were 102.9 males.

The median income for a household in the township was $65,000, and the median income for a family was $71,875. Males had a median income of $35,625 versus $31,250 for females. The per capita income for the township was $21,074. None of the families and 0.5% of the population were living below the poverty line.
