= Rhinehart Township, Polk County, Minnesota =

Rhinehart Township, Minnesota
- Township
- Location of Rhinehart Township, within Polk County, Minnesota
- Coordinates: 47°52′45″N 97°0′14″W
- Country: United States
- State: Minnesota
- County: Polk

Area
  - Total: 2.9 sq mi (7.4 km^{2})
  - Land: 2.9 sq mi (7.4 km^{2})
  - Water: 0 sq mi (0.0 km^{2})
- Elevation: 833 ft (254 m)

Population (2020)
  - Total: 139
  - Density: 49/sq mi (19/km^{2})
- Time zone: UTC-6 (Central (CST))
  - Summer (DST): UTC-5 (CDT)
- FIPS code: 27-53980
- GNIS feature ID: 0665404

Rhinehart Township is a township in Polk County, Minnesota, United States. It is part of the Grand Forks-ND-MN Metropolitan Statistical Area. The population was 139 at the 2020 census.

Rhinehart Township was named for Captain A. C. Rhinehart, a county official.

== Geography ==
According to the United States Census Bureau, the township has a total area of 2.8 square miles (7.4 km^{2}), all land.

== Demographics ==
Historical population
Census	Pop.	Note	%±
1900	160		—
1910	225		40.6%
1920	165		−26.7%
1930	149		−9.7%
1940	125		−16.1%
1950	148		18.4%
1960	220		48.6%
1970	416		89.1%
1980	98		−76.4%
1990	132		34.7%
2000	91		−31.1%
2010	139		52.7%
2020	139		0.0%
U.S. Decennial Census

As of the census of 2000, there were 91 people, 31 households, and 23 families residing in the township. The population density was 31.9 inhabitants per square mile (12.3/km^{2}). There were 32 housing units at an average density of 11.2/sq mi (4.3/km^{2}). The racial makeup of the township was 98.90% White and 1.10% Asian.

There were 31 households, out of which 38.7% had children under the age of 18 living with them, 74.2% were married couples living together, 3.2% had a female householder with no husband present, and 22.6% were non-families. 22.6% of all households were made up of individuals, and 6.5% had someone living alone who was 65 years of age or older. The average household size was 2.94 and the average family size was 3.46.

In the township the population was spread out, with 33.0% under the age of 18, 5.5% from 18 to 24, 25.3% from 25 to 44, 26.4% from 45 to 64, and 9.9% who were 65 years of age or older. The median age was 36 years. For every 100 females, there were 85.7 males. For every 100 females age 18 and over, there were 96.8 males.

The median income for a household in the township was $63,500, and the median income for a family was $63,333. Males had a median income of $63,125 versus $24,375 for females. The per capita income for the township was $24,876. There were no families and 2.2% of the population living below the poverty line, including no under eighteens and none of those over 64.
