= Roome Township, Polk County, Minnesota =

Roome Township, Minnesota
- Township
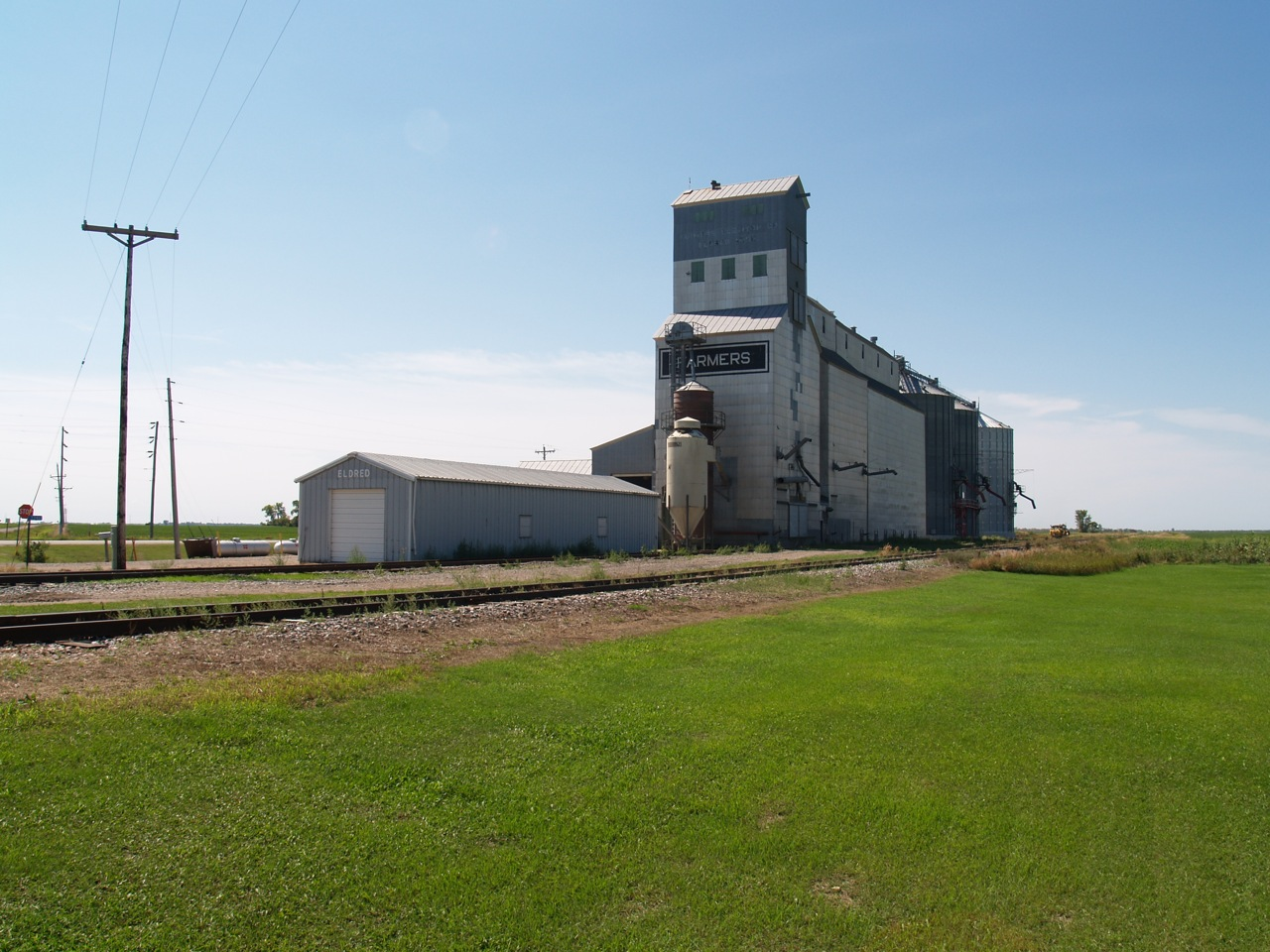
- Grain elevator in Eldred, a community in Roome Township

- Location of Roome Township, within Polk County, Minnesota
- Coordinates: 47°42′47″N 96°47′32″W
- Country: United States
- State: Minnesota
- County: Polk

Area
  - Total: 36.1 sq mi (93.4 km^{2})
  - Land: 36.1 sq mi (93.4 km^{2})
  - Water: 0 sq mi (0.0 km^{2})
- Elevation: 860 ft (262 m)

Population (2020)
  - Total: 167
  - Density: 4.63/sq mi (1.79/km^{2})
- Time zone: UTC-6 (Central (CST))
  - Summer (DST): UTC-5 (CDT)
- FIPS code: 27-55384
- GNIS feature ID: 0665453

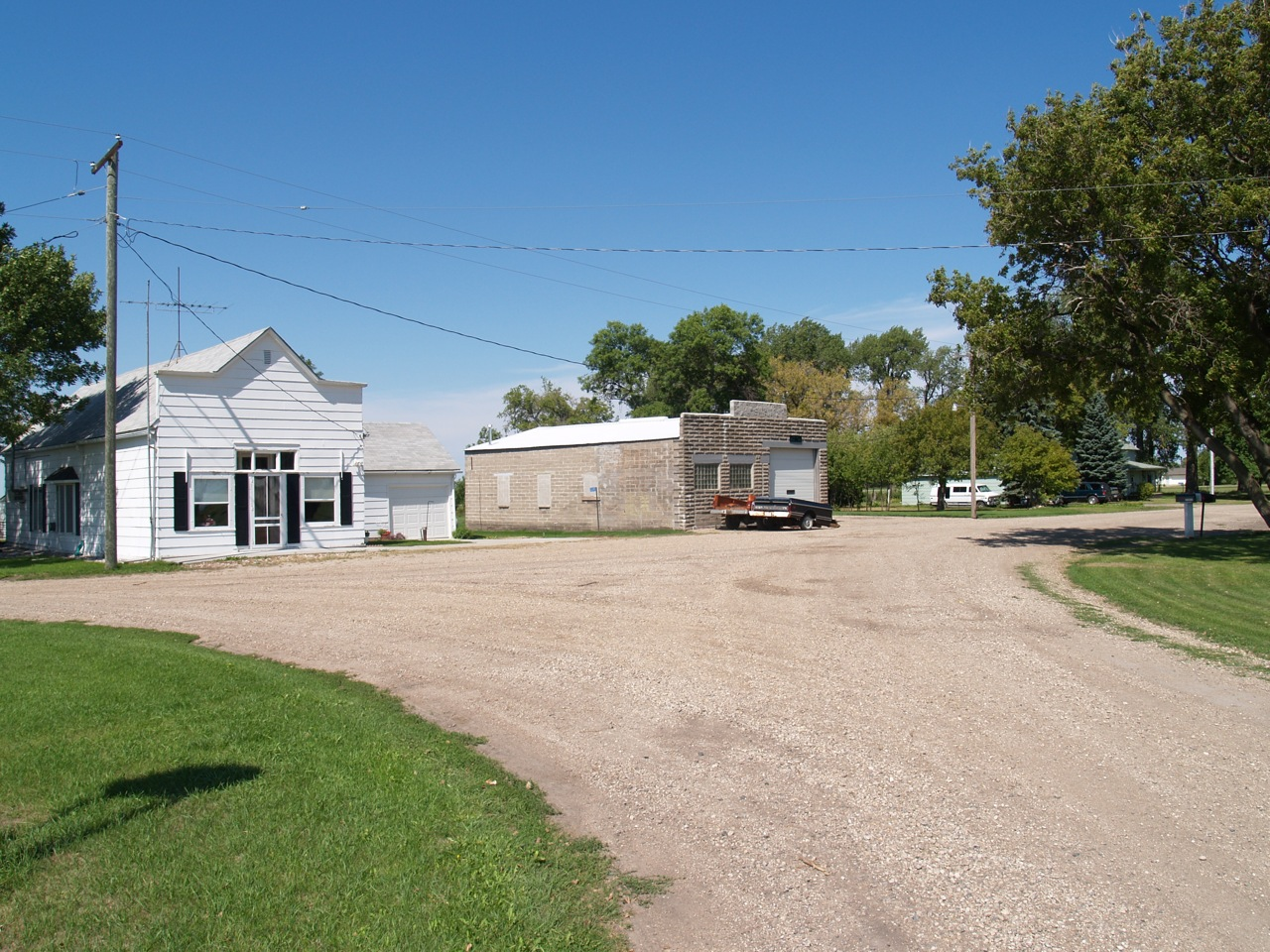
Buildings in Eldred, a community in Roome Township

Roome Township is a township in Polk County, Minnesota, United States. It is part of the Grand Forks-ND-MN Metropolitan Statistical Area. The population of the township was 167 at the 2020 census. The unincorporated community of Eldred is located within Roome Township.

Roome Township was organized in 1879.

== Geography ==
According to the United States Census Bureau, the township has a total area of 36.1 square miles (93.4 km^{2}), all land.

== Demographics ==
As of the census of 2000, there were 185 people, 66 households, and 52 families residing in the township. The population density was 5.1 people per square mile (2.0/km^{2}). There were 69 housing units at an average density of 1.9/sq mi (0.7/km^{2}). The racial makeup of the township was 100.00% White. Hispanic or Latino of any race were 1.08% of the population.

There were 66 households, out of which 34.8% had children under the age of 18 living with them, 74.2% were married couples living together, 4.5% had a female householder with no husband present, and 21.2% were non-families. 16.7% of all households were made up of individuals, and 7.6% had someone living alone who was 65 years of age or older. The average household size was 2.80 and the average family size was 3.23.

In the township the population was spread out, with 30.3% under the age of 18, 4.3% from 18 to 24, 22.7% from 25 to 44, 26.5% from 45 to 64, and 16.2% who were 65 years of age or older. The median age was 40 years. For every 100 females, there were 88.8 males. For every 100 females age 18 and over, there were 101.6 males.

The median income for a household in the township was $48,125, and the median income for a family was $47,500. Males had a median income of $41,563 versus $25,357 for females. The per capita income for the township was $19,929. None of the families and 1.1% of the population were living below the poverty line.
