= Reis Township, Polk County, Minnesota =

Reis Township, Minnesota
- Township
- Location of Reis Township, within Polk County, Minnesota
- Coordinates: 47°33′52″N 96°31′16″W
- Country: United States
- State: Minnesota
- County: Polk

Area
  - Total: 34.0 sq mi (88.1 km^{2})
  - Land: 34.0 sq mi (88.1 km^{2})
  - Water: 0 sq mi (0.0 km^{2})
- Elevation: 909 ft (277 m)

Population (2020)
  - Total: 82
  - Density: 2.4/sq mi (0.93/km^{2})
- Time zone: UTC-6 (Central (CST))
  - Summer (DST): UTC-5 (CDT)
- FIPS code: 27-53764
- GNIS feature ID: 0665395

Reis Township is a township in Polk County, Minnesota, United States. It is part of the Grand Forks-ND-MN Metropolitan Statistical Area. The population was 82 at the 2020 census.

Reis Township was organized in 1880, and named for George Reis, a pioneer settler.

== Geography ==
According to the United States Census Bureau, the township has a total area of 34.0 square miles (88.1 km^{2}), all land.

== Demographics ==
As of the census of 2000, there were 74 people, 33 households, and 22 families residing in the township. The population density was 2.2 people per square mile (0.8/km^{2}). There were 35 housing units at an average density of 1.0/sq mi (0.4/km^{2}). The racial makeup of the township was 100.00% White.

There were 33 households, out of which 24.2% had children under the age of 18 living with them, 57.6% were married couples living together, 6.1% had a female householder with no husband present, and 33.3% were non-families. 30.3% of all households were made up of individuals, and 15.2% had someone living alone who was 65 years of age or older. The average household size was 2.24 and the average family size was 2.82.

In the township the population was spread out, with 21.6% under the age of 18, 8.1% from 18 to 24, 20.3% from 25 to 44, 33.8% from 45 to 64, and 16.2% who were 65 years of age or older. The median age was 45 years. For every 100 females, there were 117.6 males. For every 100 females age 18 and over, there were 107.1 males.

The median income for a household in the township was $33,125, and the median income for a family was $32,917. Males had a median income of $41,250 versus $27,500 for females. The per capita income for the township was $18,261. There were no families and 5.0% of the population living below the poverty line, including no under eighteens and none of those over 64.
