= Fanny Township, Polk County, Minnesota =

Fanny Township, Minnesota
- Township
- Location of Fanny Township, within Polk County, Minnesota
- Coordinates: 47°53′53″N 96°40′14″W
- Country: United States
- State: Minnesota
- County: Polk

Area
  - Total: 35.8 sq mi (92.6 km^{2})
  - Land: 35.8 sq mi (92.6 km^{2})
  - Water: 0 sq mi (0.0 km^{2})
- Elevation: 883 ft (269 m)

Population (2020)
  - Total: 89
  - Density: 2.5/sq mi (0.96/km^{2})
- Time zone: UTC-6 (Central (CST))
  - Summer (DST): UTC-5 (CDT)
- FIPS code: 27-20510
- GNIS feature ID: 0664141

Fanny Township is a township in Polk County, Minnesota, United States. It is part of the Grand Forks-ND-MN Metropolitan Statistical Area. The population was 89 at the 2020 census. It is part of the Grand Forks-ND-MN Metropolitan Statistical Area.

Fanny Township was organized in 1880.

== Geography ==
According to the United States Census Bureau, the township has a total area of 35.7 square miles (92 km^{2}), all land.

== Demographics ==
As of the census of 2000, there were 105 people, 32 households, and 28 families residing in the township. The population density was 2.9 inhabitants per square mile (1.1/km^{2}). There were 35 housing units at an average density of 1.0 per square mile (0.39/km^{2}). The racial makeup of the township was 100.00% White.

There were 32 households, out of which 56.3% had children under the age of 18 living with them, 71.9% were married couples living together, 9.4% had a female householder with no husband present, and 9.4% were non-families. 9.4% of all households were made up of individuals, and 6.3% had someone living alone who was 65 years of age or older. The average household size was 3.28 and the average family size was 3.45.

In the township the population was spread out, with 36.2% under the age of 18, 6.7% from 18 to 24, 25.7% from 25 to 44, 23.8% from 45 to 64, and 7.6% who were 65 years of age or older. The median age was 34 years. For every 100 females, there were 105.9 males. For every 100 females age 18 and over, there were 103.0 males.

The median income for a household in the township was $59,063, and the median income for a family was $58,438. Males had a median income of $40,000 versus $30,833 for females. The per capita income for the township was $27,809. None of the population or the families were below the poverty line.
