= Scandia Township, Polk County, Minnesota =

Scandia Township, Minnesota
- Township
- Location of Scandia Township, within Polk County, Minnesota
- Coordinates: 47°33′0″N 96°38′38″W
- Country: United States
- State: Minnesota
- County: Polk

Area
  - Total: 36.1 sq mi (93.4 km^{2})
  - Land: 36.1 sq mi (93.4 km^{2})
  - Water: 0 sq mi (0.0 km^{2})
- Elevation: 876 ft (267 m)

Population (2000)
  - Total: 86
  - Density: 2.3/sq mi (0.9/km^{2})
- Time zone: UTC-6 (Central (CST))
  - Summer (DST): UTC-5 (CDT)
- FIPS code: 27-58882
- GNIS feature ID: 0665564

Scandia Township is a township in Polk County, Minnesota, United States. It is part of the Grand Forks-ND-MN Metropolitan Statistical Area. The population was 64 at the 2020 census.

This township was named after Scandia.

== Geography ==
According to the United States Census Bureau, the township has a total area of 36.1 square miles (93.4 km^{2}), all land.

== Demographics ==
As of the census of 2000, there were 86 people, 24 households, and 24 families residing in the township. The population density was 2.4 people per square mile (0.9/km^{2}). There were 27 housing units at an average density of 0.7/sq mi (0.3/km^{2}). The racial makeup of the township was 100% White.

There were 24 households, out of which 45.8% had children under the age of 18, 95.8% were married couples living together, and 4.2% had a female householder with no husband present. No households were individuals living alone. The average household size was 3.58 and the average family size was 3.50.

In the township the population was spread out, with 39.5% under the age of 18, 2.3% from 18 to 24, 25.6% from 25 to 44, 18.6% from 45 to 64, and 14.0% who were 65 years of age or older. The median age was 38 years. For every 100 females, there were 126.3 males. For every 100 females age 18 and over, there were 108.0 males.

The median income for a household in the township was $47,083, and the median income for a family was $47,083. Males had a median income of $40,417 versus $18,750 for females. The per capita income for the township was $16,253. There were 7.4% of families and 3.2% of the population living below the poverty line, including no under eighteens and none of those over 64.
