= Grand Forks Township, Polk County, Minnesota =

Grand Forks Township, Minnesota
- Township
- Location of Grand Forks Township, within Polk County, Minnesota
- Coordinates: 47°59′7″N 97°1′53″W
- Country: United States
- State: Minnesota
- County: Polk

Area
  - Total: 14.3 sq mi (37.0 km^{2})
  - Land: 14.2 sq mi (36.7 km^{2})
  - Water: 0.12 sq mi (0.3 km^{2})
- Elevation: 827 ft (252 m)

Population (2020)
  - Total: 195
  - Density: 13.8/sq mi (5.31/km^{2})
- Time zone: UTC-6 (Central (CST))
  - Summer (DST): UTC-5 (CDT)
- FIPS code: 27-24938
- GNIS feature ID: 0664311

Grand Forks Township is a township in Polk County, Minnesota, United States. It is part of the Grand Forks-ND-MN Metropolitan Statistical Area. The population was 195 at the 2020 census.

Grand Forks Township was organized in 1880.

== Geography ==
According to the United States Census Bureau, the township has a total area of 14.3 square miles (37 km^{2}), of which 14.2 square miles (37 km^{2}) is land and 0.1 square miles (0.26 km^{2}) (0.84%) is water.

== Demographics ==
As of the census of 2000, there were 231 people, 81 households, and 61 families residing in the township. The population density was 16.3 inhabitants per square mile (6.3/km^{2}). There were 84 housing units at an average density of 5.9 per square mile (2.3/km^{2}). The racial makeup of the township was 98.70% White, 0.87% from other races, and 0.43% from two or more races. Hispanic or Latino of any race were 4.33% of the population.

There were 81 households, out of which 35.8% had children under the age of 18 living with them, 69.1% were married couples living together, 4.9% had a female householder with no husband present, and 23.5% were non-families. 18.5% of all households were made up of individuals, and 12.3% had someone living alone who was 65 years of age or older. The average household size was 2.85 and the average family size was 3.27.

In the township the population was spread out, with 26.8% under the age of 18, 8.7% from 18 to 24, 26.4% from 25 to 44, 22.9% from 45 to 64, and 15.2% who were 65 years of age or older. The median age was 38 years. For every 100 females, there were 122.1 males. For every 100 females age 18 and over, there were 116.7 males.

The median income for a household in the township was $51,667, and the median income for a family was $53,333. Males had a median income of $39,167 versus $25,000 for females. The per capita income for the township was $22,214. About 6.9% of families and 4.0% of the population were below the poverty line, including 5.4% of those under the age of eighteen and none of those 65 or over.
