= Dugdale, Minnesota =

Dugdale
- Unincorporated community
- Location within Minnesota Location within the United States
- Coordinates: 47°42′06″N 96°15′59″W
- Country: United States
- State: Minnesota
- County: Polk
- Elevation: 1,138 ft (347 m)
- Time zone: UTC-6 (Central (CST))
  - Summer (DST): UTC-5 (CDT)
- Area code: 218
- GNIS feature ID: 654680

Dugdale is an unincorporated community in Polk County, Minnesota, United States. Dugdale is located at 47°42′06″N 96°15′59″W.

The community is located east of Crookston and south of Red Lake Falls on Minnesota State Highway 32.

A post office called Dugdale was established in 1884, and remained in operation until 1927. Dugdale had a depot on the railroad.
