= Knute Township, Polk County, Minnesota =

Knute Township, Minnesota
- Township
- Location of Knute Township, within Polk County, Minnesota
- Coordinates: 47°38′21″N 96°0′26″W
- Country: United States
- State: Minnesota
- County: Polk

Area
  - Total: 34.9 sq mi (90.3 km^{2})
  - Land: 31.5 sq mi (81.7 km^{2})
  - Water: 3.3 sq mi (8.6 km^{2})
- Elevation: 1,240 ft (378 m)

Population (2020)
  - Total: 563
  - Density: 17.8/sq mi (6.89/km^{2})
- Time zone: UTC-6 (Central (CST))
  - Summer (DST): UTC-5 (CDT)
- FIPS code: 27-33614
- GNIS feature ID: 0664642

Knute Township is a township in Polk County, Minnesota, United States. It is part of the Grand Forks-ND-MN Metropolitan Statistical Area. The population was 563 at the 2020 census.

Knute Township bears the name of Knute Nelson, a county official.

== Geography ==
According to the United States Census Bureau, the township has a total area of 34.8 square miles (90 km^{2}), of which 31.5 square miles (82 km^{2}) is land and 3.3 square miles (8.5 km^{2}) (9.53%) is water.

== Demographics ==
As of the census of 2000, there were 496 people, 168 households, and 121 families residing in the township. The population density was 15.7 inhabitants per square mile (6.1/km^{2}). There were 272 housing units at an average density of 8.6 per square mile (3.3/km^{2}). The racial makeup of the township was 97.18% White, 1.81% Native American, and 1.01% from two or more races.

There were 168 households, out of which 26.8% had children under the age of 18 living with them, 63.1% were married couples living together, 6.5% had a female householder with no husband present, and 27.4% were non-families. 25.0% of all households were made up of individuals, and 8.9% had someone living alone who was 65 years of age or older. The average household size was 2.42 and the average family size was 2.89.

In the township the population was spread out, with 21.2% under the age of 18, 2.2% from 18 to 24, 19.0% from 25 to 44, 27.4% from 45 to 64, and 30.2% who were 65 years of age or older. The median age was 52 years. For every 100 females, there were 93.8 males. For every 100 females age 18 and over, there were 87.1 males.

The median income for a household in the township was $41,750, and the median income for a family was $45,000. Males had a median income of $33,750 versus $18,750 for females. The per capita income for the township was $16,795. About 5.3% of families and 7.4% of the population were below the poverty line, including 15.0% of those under age 18 and none of those age 65 or over.
