= Columbia Township, Polk County, Minnesota =

Columbia Township, Minnesota
- Township
- Location of Columbia Township, within Polk County, Minnesota
- Coordinates: 47°31′41″N 95°38′22″W
- Country: United States
- State: Minnesota
- County: Polk

Area
  - Total: 35.8 sq mi (92.6 km^{2})
  - Land: 34.5 sq mi (89.3 km^{2})
  - Water: 1.2 sq mi (3.2 km^{2})
- Elevation: 1,437 ft (438 m)

Population (2020)
  - Total: 438
  - Density: 12.7/sq mi (4.90/km^{2})
- Time zone: UTC-6 (Central (CST))
  - Summer (DST): UTC-5 (CDT)
- FIPS code: 27-12682
- GNIS feature ID: 0663851

Columbia Township is a township in Polk County, Minnesota, United States. It is part of the Grand Forks-ND-MN Metropolitan Statistical Area. The population was 438 at the 2020 census.

== Geography ==
According to the United States Census Bureau, the township has a total area of 35.7 square miles (92 km^{2}), of which 34.5 square miles (89 km^{2}) is land and 1.2 square miles (3.1 km^{2}) (3.50%) is water.

== Demographics ==
As of the census of 2000, there were 429 people, 165 households, and 124 families residing in the township. The population density was 12.4 inhabitants per square mile (4.8/km^{2}). There were 203 housing units at an average density of 5.9 per square mile (2.3/km^{2}). The racial makeup of the township was 98.60% White, 0.47% Native American, 0.23% Asian, and 0.70% from two or more races.

There were 165 households, out of which 35.2% had children under the age of 18 living with them, 64.2% were married couples living together, 6.7% had a female householder with no husband present, and 24.8% were non-families. 23.6% of all households were made up of individuals, and 13.3% had someone living alone who was 65 years of age or older. The average household size was 2.60 and the average family size was 3.06.

In the township the population was spread out, with 26.8% under the age of 18, 7.2% from 18 to 24, 23.5% from 25 to 44, 26.6% from 45 to 64, and 15.9% who were 65 years of age or older. The median age was 40 years. For every 100 females, there were 89.0 males. For every 100 females age 18 and over, there were 93.8 males.

The median income for a household in the township was $26,827, and the median income for a family was $35,000. Males had a median income of $30,000 versus $16,944 for females. The per capita income for the township was $12,870. About 8.5% of families and 6.3% of the population were below the poverty line, including 4.0% of those under age 18 and 14.5% of those age 65 or over.
