= Huntsville Township, Polk County, Minnesota =

Huntsville Township, Minnesota
- Township
- Location of Huntsville Township, within Polk County, Minnesota
- Coordinates: 47°53′22″N 96°55′56″W
- Country: United States
- State: Minnesota
- County: Polk

Area
  - Total: 35.7 sq mi (92.5 km^{2})
  - Land: 35.6 sq mi (92.1 km^{2})
  - Water: 0.19 sq mi (0.5 km^{2})
- Elevation: 840 ft (256 m)

Population (2020)
  - Total: 442
  - Density: 12.4/sq mi (4.80/km^{2})
- Time zone: UTC-6 (Central (CST))
  - Summer (DST): UTC-5 (CDT)
- FIPS code: 27-30590
- GNIS feature ID: 0664534

Huntsville Township is a township in Polk County, Minnesota, United States. It is part of the Grand Forks-ND-MN Metropolitan Statistical Area. The population was 442 at the 2020 census.

Huntsville Township was organized in 1874, and named for Bena Hunt, a pioneer settler.

== Geography ==
According to the United States Census Bureau, the township has a total area of 35.7 square miles (92 km^{2}), of which 35.5 square miles (92 km^{2}) are land and 0.2 square miles (0.52 km^{2}) (0.53%) are water.

== Demographics ==
As of the census of 2000, there were 586 people, 182 households, and 159 families residing in the township. The population density was 16.5 inhabitants per square mile (6.4/km^{2}). There were 200 housing units at an average density of 5.6 per square mile (2.2/km^{2}). The racial makeup of the township was 96.25% White, 0.68% Native American, 2.73% from other races, and 0.34% from two or more races. Hispanic or Latino of any race were 2.90% of the population.

There were 182 households, out of which 47.8% had children under the age of 18 living with them, 78.0% were married couples living together, 6.0% had a female householder with no husband present, and 12.1% were non-families. 9.3% of all households were made up of individuals, and 3.8% had someone living alone who was 65 years of age or older. The average household size was 3.22 and the average family size was 3.46.

In the township the population was spread out, with 34.3% under the age of 18, 7.0% from 18 to 24, 27.5% from 25 to 44, 23.7% from 45 to 64, and 7.5% who were 65 years of age or older. The median age was 36 years. For every 100 females, there were 113.1 males. For every 100 females age 18 and over, there were 102.6 males.

The median income for a household in the township was $53,929, and the median income for a family was $55,833. Males had a median income of $37,500 versus $22,083 for females. The per capita income for the township was $16,115. About 6.1% of families and 6.6% of the population were below the poverty line, including 9.4% of those under age 18 and 9.8% of those age 65 or over.
