= Angus Township, Polk County, Minnesota =

Angus Township, Minnesota
- Township
- Location of Angus Township, within Polk County, Minnesota
- Coordinates: 48°4′6″N 96°42′23″W
- Country: United States
- State: Minnesota
- County: Polk

Area
  - Total: 36.0 sq mi (93.3 km^{2})
  - Land: 36.0 sq mi (93.3 km^{2})
  - Water: 0 sq mi (0.0 km^{2})
- Elevation: 876 ft (267 m)

Population (2020)
  - Total: 82
  - Density: 2.3/sq mi (0.88/km^{2})
- Time zone: UTC-6 (Central (CST))
  - Summer (DST): UTC-5 (CDT)
- FIPS code: 27-01648
- GNIS feature ID: 0663436

Angus Township is a township in Polk County, Minnesota, United States. It is part of the Grand Forks-ND-MN Metropolitan Statistical Area. The population was 82 at the 2020 census.

Angus Township was organized in 1879, and named for Richard B. Angus (1831–1922), a Canadian railroad financier.

== Geography ==
According to the United States Census Bureau, the township has a total area of 36.0 square miles (93 km^{2}), all land. Angus Township is located near geocoordinates 48.05N, 96.692W.

== Demographics ==
As of the census of 2000, there were 112 people, 40 households, and 32 families residing in the township. The population density was 3.1 inhabitants per square mile (1.2/km^{2}). There were 43 housing units at an average density of 1.2 per square mile (0.46/km^{2}). The racial makeup of the township was 96.43% White and 3.57% Native American. Hispanic or Latino of any race were 0.89% of the population.

There were 40 households, out of which 37.5% had children under the age of 18 living with them, 80.0% were married couples living together, and 20.0% were non-families. 17.5% of all households were made up of individuals, and 7.5% had someone living alone who was 65 years of age or older. The average household size was 2.80 and the average family size was 3.22.

In the township the population was spread out, with 27.7% under the age of 18, 7.1% from 18 to 24, 25.9% from 25 to 44, 22.3% from 45 to 64, and 17.0% who were 65 years of age or older. The median age was 39 years. For every 100 females, there were 115.4 males. For every 100 females age 18 and over, there were 107.7 males.

The median income for a household in the township was $58,125, and the median income for a family was $58,958. Males had a median income of $42,750 versus $21,250 for females. The per capita income for the township was $22,543. There were no families and 4.7% of the population living below the poverty line, including no under eighteens and none of those over 64.
