= Lowell Township, Polk County, Minnesota =

Lowell Township, Minnesota
- Township
- Location of Lowell Township, within Polk County, Minnesota

- Location within the state of Minnesota Lowell Township, Minnesota (the United States)
- Coordinates: 47°48′46″N 96°39′54″W
- Country: United States
- State: Minnesota
- County: Polk

Area
  - Total: 34.6 sq mi (89.6 km^{2})
  - Land: 34.6 sq mi (89.6 km^{2})
  - Water: 0 sq mi (0.0 km^{2})
- Elevation: 873 ft (266 m)

Population (2020)
  - Total: 287
  - Density: 8.30/sq mi (3.20/km^{2})
- Time zone: UTC-6 (Central (CST))
  - Summer (DST): UTC-5 (CDT)
- FIPS code: 27-38330
- GNIS feature ID: 0664831

Lowell Township is a township in Polk County, Minnesota, United States. It is part of the Grand Forks-ND-MN Metropolitan Statistical Area. The population was 287 at the 2020 census.

Lowell Township was organized in 1877, and named after Lowell, Massachusetts, the native home of a share of the first settlers.

== Geography ==
According to the United States Census Bureau, the township has a total area of 34.6 square miles (89.6 km^{2}), all land.

== Demographics ==
As of the census of 2000, there were 183 people, 69 households, and 50 families residing in the township. The population density was 5.3 inhabitants per square mile (2.0/km^{2}). There were 70 housing units at an average density of 2.0 per square mile (0.77/km^{2}). The racial makeup of the township was 91.80% White, 1.09% Native American, 6.56% from other races, and 0.55% from two or more races. Hispanic or Latino people of any race were 8.20% of the population.

There were 69 households, out of which 30.4% had children under the age of 18 living with them, 66.7% were married couples living together, 5.8% had a female householder with no husband present, and 27.5% were non-families. 20.3% of all households were made up of individuals, and 8.7% had someone living alone who was 65 years of age or older. The average household size was 2.65 and the average family size was 3.12.

In the township the population was spread out, with 29.0% under the age of 18, 6.0% from 18 to 24, 26.8% from 25 to 44, 26.8% from 45 to 64, and 11.5% who were 65 years of age or older. The median age was 38 years. For every 100 females, there were 105.6 males. For every 100 females age 18 and over, there were 97.0 males.

The median income for a household in the township was $48,125, and the median income for a family was $53,750. Males had a median income of $38,500 versus $23,750 for females. The per capita income for the township was $17,146. About 8.5% of families and 15.2% of the population were below the poverty line, including 15.1% of those under the age of eighteen and none of those 65 or over.
