= Farley Township, Polk County, Minnesota =

Farley Township, Minnesota
- Township
- Location of Farley Township, within Polk County, Minnesota
- Coordinates: 48°8′39″N 96°48′52″W
- Country: United States
- State: Minnesota
- County: Polk

Area
  - Total: 27.1 sq mi (70.1 km^{2})
  - Land: 27.1 sq mi (70.1 km^{2})
  - Water: 0 sq mi (0.0 km^{2})
- Elevation: 840 ft (256 m)

Population (2020)
  - Total: 59
  - Density: 2.2/sq mi (0.84/km^{2})
- Time zone: UTC-6 (Central (CST))
  - Summer (DST): UTC-5 (CDT)
- FIPS code: 27-20564
- GNIS feature ID: 0664144

Farley Township is a township in Polk County, Minnesota, United States. It is part of the Grand Forks-ND-MN Metropolitan Statistical Area. The population was 59 at the 2020 census.

Farley Township was organized in 1878, and named for Jesse P. Farley, a railroad official.

== Geography ==
According to the United States Census Bureau, the township has a total area of 27.1 square miles (70 km^{2}), all land.

== Demographics ==
As of the census of 2000, there were 50 people, 21 households, and 14 families residing in the township. The population density was 1.8 inhabitants per square mile (0.69/km^{2}). There were 22 housing units at an average density of 0.8 per square mile (0.31/km^{2}). The racial makeup of the township was 100.00% White.

There were 21 households, out of which 28.6% had children under the age of 18 living with them, 66.7% were married couples living together, and 33.3% were non-families. 28.6% of all households were made up of individuals, and 4.8% had someone living alone who was 65 years of age or older. The average household size was 2.29 and the average family size was 2.86.

In the township the population was spread out, with 22.0% under the age of 18, 32.0% from 25 to 44, 34.0% from 45 to 64, and 12.0% who were 65 years of age or older. The median age was 42 years. For every 100 females, there were 108.3 males. For every 100 females age 18 and over, there were 116.7 males.

The median income for a household in the township was $43,125, and the median income for a family was $60,625. Males had a median income of $43,750 versus $11,250 for females. The per capita income for the township was $18,032. There were no families and 10.8% of the population living below the poverty line, including no under eighteens and none of those over 64.
