= Belgium Township, Polk County, Minnesota =

Belgium Township, Minnesota
- Township
- Location of Belgium Township, within Polk County, Minnesota
- Coordinates: 47°58′40″N 96°34′12″W
- Country: United States
- State: Minnesota
- County: Polk

Area
  - Total: 36.4 sq mi (94.4 km^{2})
  - Land: 36.4 sq mi (94.4 km^{2})
  - Water: 0 sq mi (0.0 km^{2})
- Elevation: 938 ft (286 m)

Population (2020)
  - Total: 63
  - Density: 1.7/sq mi (0.67/km^{2})
- Time zone: UTC-6 (Central (CST))
  - Summer (DST): UTC-5 (CDT)
- FIPS code: 27-04726
- GNIS feature ID: 0663550

Belgium Township is a township in Polk County, Minnesota, United States. The population was 63 at the 2020 census. It is part of the Grand Forks-ND-MN Metropolitan Statistical Area.

Belgium Township was organized in 1880. A large share of the early settlers being natives of Belgium caused the name to be selected.

== Geography ==
According to the United States Census Bureau, the township has a total area of 36.5 square miles (95 km^{2}), of which 36.4 square miles (94 km^{2}) is land and 0.04 square miles (0.10 km^{2}) (0.05%) is water.

== Demographics ==
As of the census of 2000, there were 111 people, 35 households, and 26 families residing in the township. The population density was 3.0 inhabitants per square mile (1.2/km^{2}). There were 38 housing units at an average density of 1.0 per square mile (0.39/km^{2}). The racial makeup of the township was 91.89% White and 8.11% Native American.

There were 35 households, out of which 42.9% had children under the age of 18 living with them, 71.4% were married couples living together, 2.9% had a female householder with no husband present, and 25.7% were non-families. 22.9% of all households were made up of individuals, and 11.4% had someone living alone who was 65 years of age or older. The average household size was 3.17 and the average family size was 3.88.

In the township the population was spread out, with 36.9% under the age of 18, 6.3% from 18 to 24, 32.4% from 25 to 44, 17.1% from 45 to 64, and 7.2% who were 65 years of age or older. The median age was 33 years. For every 100 females there were 105.6 males. For every 100 females age 18 and over, there were 100.0 males.

The median income for a household in the township was $38,750, and the median income for a family was $38,750. Males had a median income of $26,875 versus $13,500 for females. The per capita income for the township was $10,385. There were 21.4% of families and 21.5% of the population living below the poverty line, including 20.0% of under eighteens and none of those over 64.
