= Helgeland Township, Polk County, Minnesota =

Helgeland Township, Minnesota
- Township
- Location of Helgeland Township, within Polk County, Minnesota
- Coordinates: 48°8′42″N 96°35′15″W
- Country: United States
- State: Minnesota
- County: Polk

Area
  - Total: 27.1 sq mi (70.1 km^{2})
  - Land: 27.1 sq mi (70.1 km^{2})
  - Water: 0 sq mi (0.0 km^{2})
- Elevation: 945 ft (288 m)

Population (2020)
  - Total: 41
  - Density: 1.5/sq mi (0.58/km^{2})
- Time zone: UTC-6 (Central (CST))
  - Summer (DST): UTC-5 (CDT)
- FIPS code: 27-28358
- GNIS feature ID: 0664445

Helgeland Township is a township in Polk County, Minnesota, United States. It is part of the Grand Forks-ND-MN Metropolitan Statistical Area. The population was 41 at the 2020 census.

Helgeland Township was named after Helgeland, in Norway.

== Geography ==
According to the United States Census Bureau, the township has a total area of 27.1 square miles (70 km^{2}), all land.

== Demographics ==
As of the census of 2000, there were 52 people, 18 households, and 16 families residing in the township. The population density was 1.9 inhabitants per square mile (0.73/km^{2}). There were 20 housing units at an average density of 0.7 per square mile (0.27/km^{2}). The racial makeup of the township was 100.00% White.

There were 18 households, out of which 33.3% had children under the age of 18 living with them, 77.8% were married couples living together, 11.1% had a female householder with no husband present, and 11.1% were non-families. 11.1% of all households were made up of individuals, and none had someone living alone who was 65 years of age or older. The average household size was 2.89 and the average family size was 3.13.

In the township the population was spread out, with 28.8% under the age of 18, 5.8% from 18 to 24, 25.0% from 25 to 44, 21.2% from 45 to 64, and 19.2% who were 65 years of age or older. The median age was 42 years. For every 100 females, there were 108.0 males. For every 100 females age 18 and over, there were 117.6 males.

The median income for a household in the township was $43,750, and the median income for a family was $40,000. Males had a median income of $41,667 versus $16,750 for females. The per capita income for the township was $14,768. None of the population or the families were below the poverty line.
