= Nesbit Township, Polk County, Minnesota =

Nesbit Township, Minnesota
- Township
- Location of Nesbit Township, within Polk County, Minnesota
- Coordinates: 47°53′2″N 96°48′56″W
- Country: United States
- State: Minnesota
- County: Polk

Area
  - Total: 36.0 sq mi (93.2 km^{2})
  - Land: 36.0 sq mi (93.2 km^{2})
  - Water: 0 sq mi (0.0 km^{2})
- Elevation: 850 ft (259 m)

Population (2020)
  - Total: 111
  - Density: 3.08/sq mi (1.19/km^{2})
- Time zone: UTC-6 (Central (CST))
  - Summer (DST): UTC-5 (CDT)
- FIPS code: 27-45214
- GNIS feature ID: 0665079

Nesbit Township is a township in Polk County, Minnesota, United States. It is part of the Grand Forks-ND-MN Metropolitan Statistical Area. The population was 111 at the 2020 census.

Nesbit Township was named for brothers James Nesbit and Robert Nesbit, pioneer settlers.

== Geography ==
According to the United States Census Bureau, the township has a total area of 36.0 square miles (93.2 km^{2}), all land.

== Demographics ==
As of the census of 2000, there were 130 people, 44 households, and 38 families residing in the township. The population density was 3.6 people per square mile (1.4/km^{2}). There were 52 housing units at an average density of 1.4/sq mi (0.6/km^{2}). The racial makeup of the township was 94.62% White, 4.62% Native American, and 0.77% from two or more races. Hispanic or Latino of any race were 3.08% of the population.

There were 44 households, out of which 38.6% had children under the age of 18 living with them, 79.5% were married couples living together, 6.8% had a female householder with no husband present, and 11.4% were non-families. 11.4% of all households were made up of individuals, and 4.5% had someone living alone who was 65 years of age or older. The average household size was 2.95 and the average family size was 3.18.

In the township the population was spread out, with 28.5% under the age of 18, 6.2% from 18 to 24, 33.8% from 25 to 44, 16.9% from 45 to 64, and 14.6% who were 65 years of age or older. The median age was 34 years. For every 100 females, there were 91.2 males. For every 100 females age 18 and over, there were 97.9 males.

The median income for a household in the township was $42,083, and the median income for a family was $44,688. Males had a median income of $35,208 versus $30,000 for females. The per capita income for the township was $18,744. There were 11.4% of families and 5.9% of the population living below the poverty line, including 6.9% of under eighteens and none of those over 64.
