= Sullivan Township, Polk County, Minnesota =

Sullivan Township, Minnesota
- Township
- Location of Sullivan Township, within Polk County, Minnesota
- Coordinates: 47°58′25″N 96°56′48″W
- Country: United States
- State: Minnesota
- County: Polk

Area
  - Total: 35.7 sq mi (92.5 km^{2})
  - Land: 35.6 sq mi (92.3 km^{2})
  - Water: 0.077 sq mi (0.2 km^{2})
- Elevation: 833 ft (254 m)

Population (2020)
  - Total: 164
  - Density: 4.60/sq mi (1.78/km^{2})
- Time zone: UTC-6 (Central (CST))
  - Summer (DST): UTC-5 (CDT)
- FIPS code: 27-63310
- GNIS feature ID: 0665734

Sullivan Township is a township in Polk County, Minnesota, United States. It is part of the Grand Forks-ND-MN Metropolitan Statistical Area. The population was 164 at the 2020 census.

Sullivan Township was organized in 1880, and named for Timothy Sullivan, a local judge.

== Geography ==
According to the United States Census Bureau, the township has a total area of 35.7 square miles (92.5 km^{2}), of which 35.6 square miles (92.3 km^{2}) is land and 0.1 square mile (0.2 km^{2}) (0.25%) is water.

== Demographics ==
As of the census of 2000, there were 174 people, 61 households, and 48 families residing in the township. The population density was 4.9 people per square mile (1.9/km^{2}). There were 64 housing units at an average density of 1.8/sq mi (0.7/km^{2}). The racial makeup of the township was 98.85% White, 0.57% Native American, and 0.57% from two or more races.

There were 61 households, out of which 44.3% had children under the age of 18 living with them, 72.1% were married couples living together, 1.6% had a female householder with no husband present, and 19.7% were non-families. 16.4% of all households were made up of individuals, and 8.2% had someone living alone who was 65 years of age or older. The average household size was 2.85 and the average family size was 3.18.

In the township the population was spread out, with 28.7% under the age of 18, 7.5% from 18 to 24, 31.0% from 25 to 44, 21.8% from 45 to 64, and 10.9% who were 65 years of age or older. The median age was 37 years. For every 100 females, there were 104.7 males. For every 100 females age 18 and over, there were 113.8 males.

The median income for a household in the township was $45,250, and the median income for a family was $54,375. Males had a median income of $29,167 versus $22,750 for females. The per capita income for the township was $16,360. None of the families and 2.2% of the population were living below the poverty line, including no under eighteens and 10.5% of those over 64.
