= Johnson Township, Polk County, Minnesota =

Johnson Township, Minnesota
- Township
- Location of Johnson Township, within Polk County, Minnesota
- Coordinates: 47°53′3″N 95°39′25″W
- Country: United States
- State: Minnesota
- County: Polk

Area
  - Total: 35.7 sq mi (92.4 km^{2})
  - Land: 35.7 sq mi (92.4 km^{2})
  - Water: 0 sq mi (0.0 km^{2})
- Elevation: 1,165 ft (355 m)

Population (2020)
  - Total: 41
  - Density: 1.1/sq mi (0.44/km^{2})
- Time zone: UTC-6 (Central (CST))
  - Summer (DST): UTC-5 (CDT)
- FIPS code: 27-32030
- GNIS feature ID: 0664585

Johnson Township is a township in Polk County, Minnesota, United States. It is part of the Grand Forks-ND-MN Metropolitan Statistical Area. The population was 41 at the 2020 census.

Johnson Township was organized in 1898, and named for John O. Johnson, a county official.

== Geography ==
According to the United States Census Bureau, the township has a total area of 35.7 square miles (92 km^{2}), all land.

== Demographics ==
At the 2000 census there were 62 people, 28 households, and 15 families in the township. The population density was 1.7 people per square mile (0.7/km^{2}). There were 33 housing units at an average density of 0.9/sq mi (0.4/km^{2}). The racial makeup of the township was 96.77% White, and 3.23% from two or more races. Of the 28 households 14.3% had children under the age of 18 living with them, 42.9% were married couples living together, 7.1% had a female householder with no husband present, and 46.4% were non-families. 46.4% of households were one person and 17.9% were one person aged 65 or older. The average household size was 2.21 and the average family size was 3.13.

The age distribution was 24.2% under the age of 18, 1.6% from 18 to 24, 22.6% from 25 to 44, 30.6% from 45 to 64, and 21.0% 65 or older. The median age was 46 years. For every 100 females, there were 129.6 males. For every 100 females age 18 and over, there were 104.3 males.

The median household income was $20,313 and the median family income was $30,750. Males had a median income of $21,250 versus $16,250 for females. The per capita income for the township was $11,073. There were no families and 12.5% of the population living below the poverty line, including no under eighteens and 14.3% of those over 64.
