= Benoit, Minnesota =

Benoit
- Unincorporated community
- Location within Minnesota Location within the United States
- Coordinates: 47°42′06″N 96°23′41″W
- Country: United States
- State: Minnesota
- County: Polk
- Elevation: 1,020 ft (310 m)
- Time zone: UTC-6 (Central (CST))
  - Summer (DST): UTC-5 (CDT)
- Area code: 218
- GNIS feature ID: 654601

Benoit is an unincorporated community in Polk County, Minnesota, United States.
