= Sandsville Township, Polk County, Minnesota =

Sandsville Township, Minnesota
- Township
- Location of Sandsville Township, within Polk County, Minnesota
- Coordinates: 48°7′47″N 96°57′58″W
- Country: United States
- State: Minnesota
- County: Polk

Area
  - Total: 27.0 sq mi (69.9 km^{2})
  - Land: 27.0 sq mi (69.9 km^{2})
  - Water: 0 sq mi (0.0 km^{2})
- Elevation: 820 ft (250 m)

Population (2020)
  - Total: 47
  - Density: 1.7/sq mi (0.67/km^{2})
- Time zone: UTC-6 (Central (CST))
  - Summer (DST): UTC-5 (CDT)
- FIPS code: 27-58432
- GNIS feature ID: 0665548

Sandsville Township is a township in Polk County, Minnesota, United States. It is part of the Grand Forks-ND-MN Metropolitan Statistical Area. At the 2020 census, the population was 47.

Sandsville Township was organized in 1882, and named for brothers Casper Sand and Martin Sand, Norwegian settlers.

== Geography ==
According to the United States Census Bureau, the township has a total area of 27.0 square miles (69.9 km^{2}), all land.

== Demographics ==
As of the census of 2000, there were 58 people, 25 households, and 18 families residing in the township. The population density was 2.1 people per square mile (0.8/km^{2}). There were 29 housing units at an average density of 1.1/sq mi (0.4/km^{2}). The racial makeup of the township was 100.00% White.

There were 25 households, out of which 24.0% had children under the age of 18 living with them, 68.0% were married couples living together, 4.0% had a female householder with no husband present, and 28.0% were non-families. 24.0% of all households were made up of individuals, and 12.0% had someone living alone who was 65 years of age or older. The average household size was 2.32 and the average family size was 2.72.

In the township the population was spread out, with 24.1% under the age of 18, 5.2% from 18 to 24, 36.2% from 25 to 44, 17.2% from 45 to 64, and 17.2% who were 65 years of age or older. The median age was 38 years. For every 100 females, there were 132.0 males. For every 100 females age 18 and over, there were 120.0 males.

The median income for a household in the township was $59,375, and the median income for a family was $68,125. Males had a median income of $31,875 versus $21,250 for females. The per capita income for the township was $22,240. None of the population or the families were below the poverty line.
