= Tynsid Township, Polk County, Minnesota =

Tynsid Township, Minnesota
- Township
- Location of Tynsid Township, within Polk County, Minnesota
- Coordinates: 47°42′56″N 96°53′20″W
- Country: United States
- State: Minnesota
- County: Polk

Area
  - Total: 14.3 sq mi (37.0 km^{2})
  - Land: 14.3 sq mi (37.0 km^{2})
  - Water: 0 sq mi (0.0 km^{2})
- Elevation: 850 ft (260 m)

Population (2020)
  - Total: 77
  - Density: 5.4/sq mi (2.1/km^{2})
- Time zone: UTC-6 (Central (CST))
  - Summer (DST): UTC-5 (CDT)
- FIPS code: 27-66064
- GNIS feature ID: 0665831

Tynsid Township is a township in Polk County, Minnesota, United States. It is part of the Grand Forks-ND-MN Metropolitan Statistical Area. The population was 77 at the 2020 census.

Tynsid Township was organized in 1879, and named after Tynset Municipality in Norway.

== Geography ==
According to the United States Census Bureau, the township has a total area of 14.3 square miles (37.0 km^{2}), all land.

== Demographics ==
As of the census of 2000, there were 58 people, 26 households, and 21 families residing in the township. The population density was 4.1 people per square mile (1.6/km^{2}). There were 29 housing units at an average density of 2.0/sq mi (0.8/km^{2}). The racial makeup of the township was 98.28% White and 1.72% Native American.

There were 26 households, out of which 19.2% had children under the age of 18 living with them, 76.9% were married couples living together, and 19.2% were non-families. 11.5% of all households were made up of individuals, and 7.7% had someone living alone who was 65 years of age or older. The average household size was 2.23 and the average family size was 2.43.

In the township the population was spread out, with 13.8% under the age of 18, 3.4% from 18 to 24, 24.1% from 25 to 44, 51.7% from 45 to 64, and 6.9% who were 65 years of age or older. The median age was 48 years. For every 100 females, there were 132.0 males. For every 100 females age 18 and over, there were 127.3 males.

The median income for a household in the township was $48,000, and the median income for a family was $49,750. Males had a median income of $33,125 versus $20,417 for females. The per capita income for the township was $21,038. None of the population or the families were below the poverty line.
