= Lessor Township, Polk County, Minnesota =

Lessor Township, Minnesota
- Township
- Location of Lessor Township, within Polk County, Minnesota
- Coordinates: 47°42′6″N 95°54′17″W
- Country: United States
- State: Minnesota
- County: Polk

Area
  - Total: 36.4 sq mi (94.3 km^{2})
  - Land: 35.6 sq mi (92.2 km^{2})
  - Water: 0.81 sq mi (2.1 km^{2})
- Elevation: 1,211 ft (369 m)

Population (2020)
  - Total: 139
  - Density: 3.90/sq mi (1.51/km^{2})
- Time zone: UTC-6 (Central (CST))
  - Summer (DST): UTC-5 (CDT)
- FIPS code: 27-36692
- GNIS feature ID: 0664765

Lessor Township is a township in Polk County, Minnesota, United States. It is part of the Grand Forks-ND-MN Metropolitan Statistical Area. The population was 139 at the 2020 census.

Lessor is a corruption of Lessard, the surname of an early settler.

== Geography ==
According to the United States Census Bureau, the township has a total area of 36.4 square miles (94.3 km^{2}), of which 35.6 square miles (92.2 km^{2}) is land and 0.8 square miles (2.1 km^{2}) (2.22%) is water.

== Demographics ==
At the 2000 census, there were 197 people, 73 households and 54 families residing in the township. The population density was 5.5 per square mile (2.1/km^{2}). There were 90 housing units at an average density of 2.5/sq mi (1.0/km^{2}). The racial makeup of the township was 99.49% White and 0.51% from two or more races. Hispanic or Latino of any race were 0.51% of the population.

There were 73 households, of which 32.9% had children under the age of 18 living with them, 71.2% were married couples living together, 1.4% had a female householder with no husband present, and 26.0% were non-families. 26.0% of all households were made up of individuals, and 16.4% had someone living alone who was 65 years of age or older. The average household size was 2.70 and the average family size was 3.28.

26.4% of the population were under the age of 18, 6.6% from 18 to 24, 21.8% from 25 to 44, 27.4% from 45 to 64, and 17.8% who were 65 years of age or older. The median age was 42 years. For every 100 females, there were 116.5 males. For every 100 females age 18 and over, there were 116.4 males.

The median household income was $35,417 and the median family income was $41,250. Males had a median income of $31,250 and females $21,528. The per capita income was $19,808. About 8.1% of families and 14.7% of the population were below the poverty line, including 13.6% of those under the age of eighteen and 13.9% of those 65 or over.
