= Hill River Township, Polk County, Minnesota =

Hill River Township, Minnesota
- Township
- Location of Hill River Township, within Polk County, Minnesota
- Coordinates: 47°42′42″N 95°46′45″W
- Country: United States
- State: Minnesota
- County: Polk

Area
  - Total: 36.3 sq mi (93.9 km^{2})
  - Land: 34.9 sq mi (90.5 km^{2})
  - Water: 1.4 sq mi (3.5 km^{2})
- Elevation: 1,280 ft (390 m)

Population (2020)
  - Total: 197
  - Density: 5.64/sq mi (2.18/km^{2})
- Time zone: UTC-6 (Central (CST))
  - Summer (DST): UTC-5 (CDT)
- FIPS code: 27-29186
- GNIS feature ID: 0664479

Hill River Township is a township in Polk County, Minnesota, United States. It is part of the Grand Forks-ND-MN Metropolitan Statistical Area. The population was 197 at the 2020 census.

This township was named for the Hill River.

== Geography ==
According to the United States Census Bureau, the township has a total area of 36.3 square miles (94 km^{2}), of which 34.9 square miles (90 km^{2}) is land and 1.3 square miles (3.4 km^{2}) (3.67%) is water.

== Demographics ==
As of the census of 2000, there were 162 people, 67 households, and 52 families residing in the township. The population density was 4.6 inhabitants per square mile (1.8/km^{2}). There were 80 housing units at an average density of 2.3 per square mile (0.89/km^{2}). The racial makeup of the township was 96.91% White, and 3.09% from two or more races.

There were 67 households, out of which 28.4% had children under the age of 18 living with them, 65.7% were married couples living together, 9.0% had a female householder with no husband present, and 20.9% were non-families. 19.4% of all households were made up of individuals, and 9.0% had someone living alone who was 65 years of age or older. The average household size was 2.42 and the average family size was 2.75.

In the township the population was spread out, with 21.0% under the age of 18, 6.8% from 18 to 24, 22.2% from 25 to 44, 25.9% from 45 to 64, and 24.1% who were 65 years of age or older. The median age was 45 years. For every 100 females, there were 100.0 males. For every 100 females age 18 and over, there were 106.5 males.

The median income for a household in the township was $32,917, and the median income for a family was $35,000. Males had a median income of $33,750 versus $17,679 for females. The per capita income for the township was $18,044. About 1.5% of families and 6.2% of the population were below the poverty line, including 13.5% of those under the age of eighteen and none of those 65 or over.
