= Polk County, Minnesota =

County in Minnesota, United States

- County
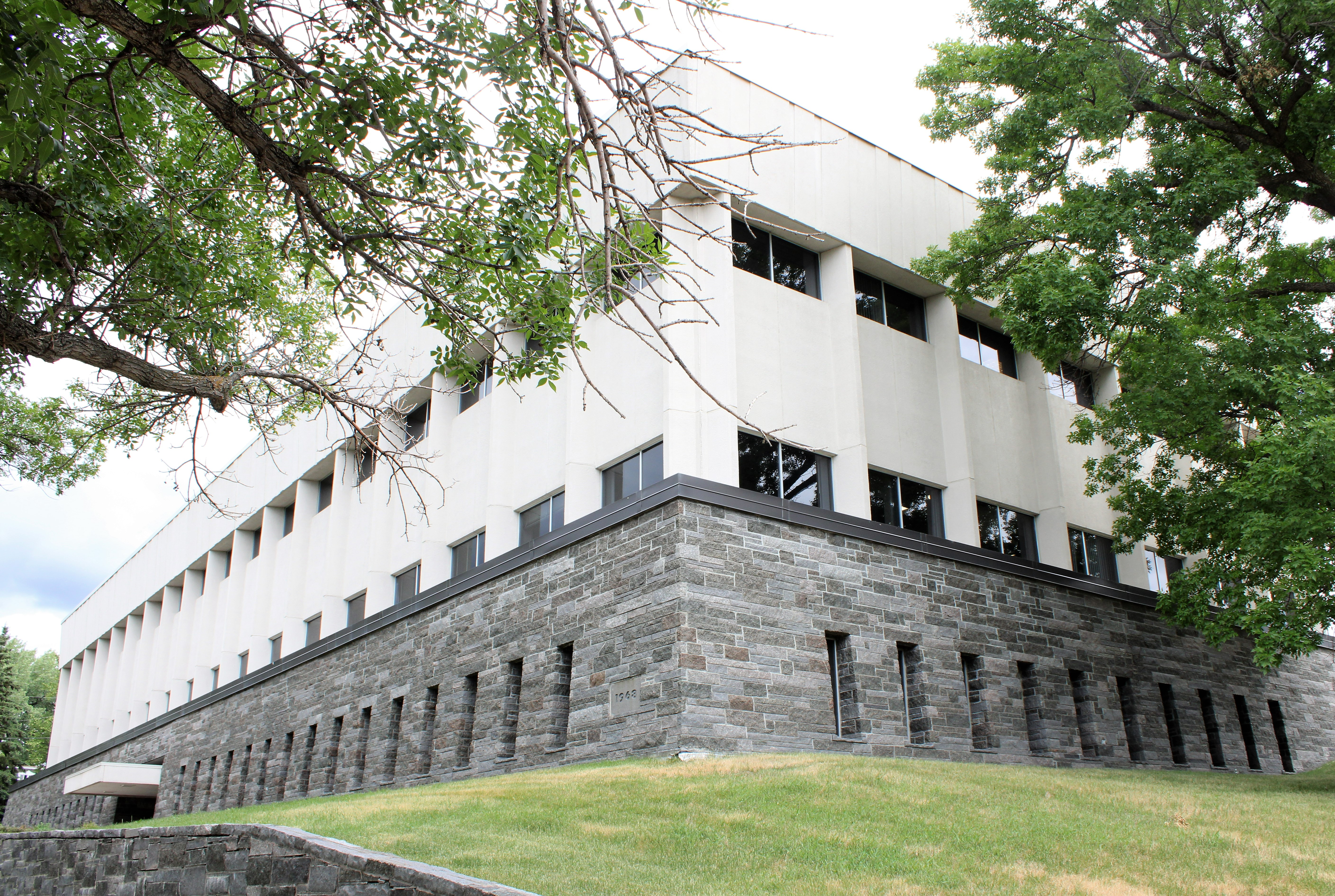
- The Polk County Government Center in Crookston

- Location within the U.S. state of Minnesota
- Coordinates: 47.774254°N 96.400027°W
- Country: United States
- State: Minnesota
- Founded: July 20, 1858 (created); February 27, 1879 (organized)
- Named for: James Knox Polk
- Seat: Crookston
- Largest city: East Grand Forks

Area
  - Total: 1,997.791 sq mi (5,174.25 km^{2})
  - Land: 1,970.999 sq mi (5,104.86 km^{2})
  - Water: 26.792 sq mi (69.39 km^{2}) 1.34%

Population (2020)
  - Total: 31,192
  - Estimate (2025): 30,545 ▼
  - Density: 15.431/sq mi (5.958/km^{2})
- Time zone: UTC−6 (Central)
  - Summer (DST): UTC−5 (CDT)
- Area code: 218
- Congressional district: 7th
- Website: polkcountymn.gov

Polk County is a county in the northwestern part of the U.S. state of Minnesota. The population was 31,192 at the 2020 census, and was estimated at 30,413 in 2024. The county seat is Crookston and the largest city is East Grand Forks.

Polk County is part of the Grand Forks metropolitan statistical area.

== History ==
In one of its early acts as a state entity, the Minnesota Legislature created the county on July 20, 1858, but did not organize it at that time. The county was named for the 11th president of the United States, James K. Polk, who signed the congressional act that organized the Minnesota Territory. The county was organized in 1872 and 1873, with the newly settled community of Crookston as the county seat.

== Geography ==
Polk County lies on Minnesota's border with North Dakota (across the Red River). The Red Lake River flows west through the upper central part of the county, discharging into the Red at Grand Forks. The county terrain consists of low, rolling hills, devoted to agriculture. The county slopes to the west and north, with its highest point near its southeast corner, at 1,519 ft (463 m) above sea level.

According to the United States Census Bureau, the county has an area of 1,997.791 square miles (5,174.25 km^{2}), of which 1,970.999 square miles (5,104.86 km^{2}) is land and 26.792 square miles (69.39 km^{2}) (1.34%) is water. It is Minnesota's 8th-largest county by area.

Soils of Polk County

USGS surveys show the county's high point is 1,575 ft (0.480 km) south of U.S. 2, about 2 km east of Spring Lake, at 47.5197°N, 95.5906°W.

=== Transit ===
- Tri-Valley Opportunity Council (T.H.E. Bus)

=== Major highways ===
- U.S. Highway 2
- U.S. Highway 59
- U.S. Highway 75
- Minnesota State Highway 9
- Minnesota State Highway 32
- Minnesota State Highway 92
- Minnesota State Highway 102
- Minnesota State Highway 220
- Polk County State-Aid Highway 21: This is the major connector between Grand Forks and Pennington County, and connects with Pennington County State-Aid Highway 3.
- Polk County State-Aid Highway 9: A major connector between Crookston and the south end of Grand Forks, it connects with Grand Forks County Road 7, and functions as a southside connector between US 75 and US 2 in Crookston.
- Polk County State-Aid Highways 11 & 46: US 2 Truck Bypass of Crookston
- Polk County State-Aid Highway 2: Designated and designed for heavy truck traffic connecting US 2 to Roseau County and Marshall County.

=== Adjacent counties ===
- Marshall County (north)
- Pennington County (northeast)
- Red Lake County (northeast)
- Clearwater County (east)
- Mahnomen County (southeast)
- Norman County (south)
- Traill County, North Dakota (southwest)
- Grand Forks County, North Dakota (west)

=== Protected areas ===
- Agassiz Dunes Scientific and Natural Area (part)
- Belgium State Wildlife Management Area
- Brandsvold State Wildlife Management Area
- Castor State Wildlife Management Area
- Enerson State Wildlife Management Area
- Erskine State Wildlife Management Area
- Glacial Ridge National Wildlife Refuge
- Gully Fen Scientific and Natural Area
- Hangaard State Wildlife Management Area
- Hasselton State Wildlife Management Area (part)
- Hill River State Wildlife Management Area
- Kroening State Wildlife Management Area
- Lavoi State Wildlife Management Area
- Lessor State Wildlife Management Area
- Mahgre State Wildlife Management Area
- Malmberg Prairie Scientific and Natural Area
- Pembina State Wildlife Management Area
- Polk State Wildlife Management Area
- Red River State Recreation Area (part)
- Red River Valley Natural History Area
- Rindahl State Wildlife Management Area
- Rydell National Wildlife Refuge
- Sand Hill Recreation Area
- Shypoke State Wildlife Management Area
- Stipa State Wildlife Management Area

== Demographics ==
Historical population
Census	Pop.	Note	%±
1860	240		—
1880	11,433		—
1890	30,192		164.1%
1900	35,429		17.3%
1910	36,001		1.6%
1920	37,090		3.0%
1930	36,019		−2.9%
1940	37,734		4.8%
1950	35,900		−4.9%
1960	36,182		0.8%
1970	34,435		−4.8%
1980	34,844		1.2%
1990	32,498		−6.7%
2000	31,369		−3.5%
2010	31,600		0.7%
2020	31,192		−1.3%
2025 (est.)	30,545	▼	−2.1%
U.S. Decennial Census; 1790–1960 1900–1990; 1990–2000 2010–2020|

As of the fourth quarter of 2024, the median home value in Polk County was $227,076.

As of the 2023 American Community Survey, there are 12,448 estimated households in Polk County with an average of 2.38 persons per household. The county has a median household income of $69,136. Approximately 10.7% of the county's population lives at or below the poverty line. Polk County has an estimated 66.0% employment rate, with 28.1% of the population holding a bachelor's degree or higher and 93.2% holding a high school diploma.

The top five reported ancestries (people were allowed to report up to two ancestries, thus the figures will generally add to more than 100%) were English (93.7%), Spanish (2.6%), Indo-European (2.2%), Asian and Pacific Islander (0.2%), and Other (1.4%).

The median age in the county was 39.3 years.

=== Racial and ethnic composition ===
Polk County, Minnesota – racial and ethnic composition
Note: the US Census treats Hispanic/Latino as an ethnic category. This table excludes Latinos from the racial categories and assigns them to a separate category. Hispanics/Latinos may be of any race.

Race / ethnicity (NH = non-Hispanic)	Pop. 1980	Pop. 1990	Pop. 2000	Pop. 2010	Pop. 2020
White alone (NH)	33,869 (97.20%)	30,824 (94.85%)	28,994 (92.43%)	28,497 (90.18%)	26,538 (85.08%)
Black or African American alone (NH)	64 (0.18%)	53 (0.16%)	86 (0.27%)	248 (0.78%)	958 (3.07%)
Native American or Alaska Native alone (NH)	268 (0.77%)	376 (1.16%)	381 (1.21%)	413 (1.31%)	376 (1.21%)
Asian alone (NH)	83 (0.24%)	89 (0.27%)	91 (0.29%)	210 (0.66%)	156 (0.50%)
Pacific Islander alone (NH)	—	—	2 (0.01%)	2 (0.01%)	4 (0.01%)
Other race alone (NH)	0 (0.00%)	10 (0.03%)	0 (0.00%)	9 (0.03%)	71 (0.23%)
Mixed race or multiracial (NH)	—	—	313 (1.00%)	501 (1.59%)	1,090 (3.49%)
Hispanic or Latino (any race)	560 (1.61%)	1,146 (3.53%)	1,502 (4.79%)	1,720 (5.44%)	1,999 (6.41%)
Total	34,844 (100.00%)	32,498 (100.00%)	31,369 (100.00%)	31,600 (100.00%)	31,192 (100.00%)

=== 2024 estimate ===
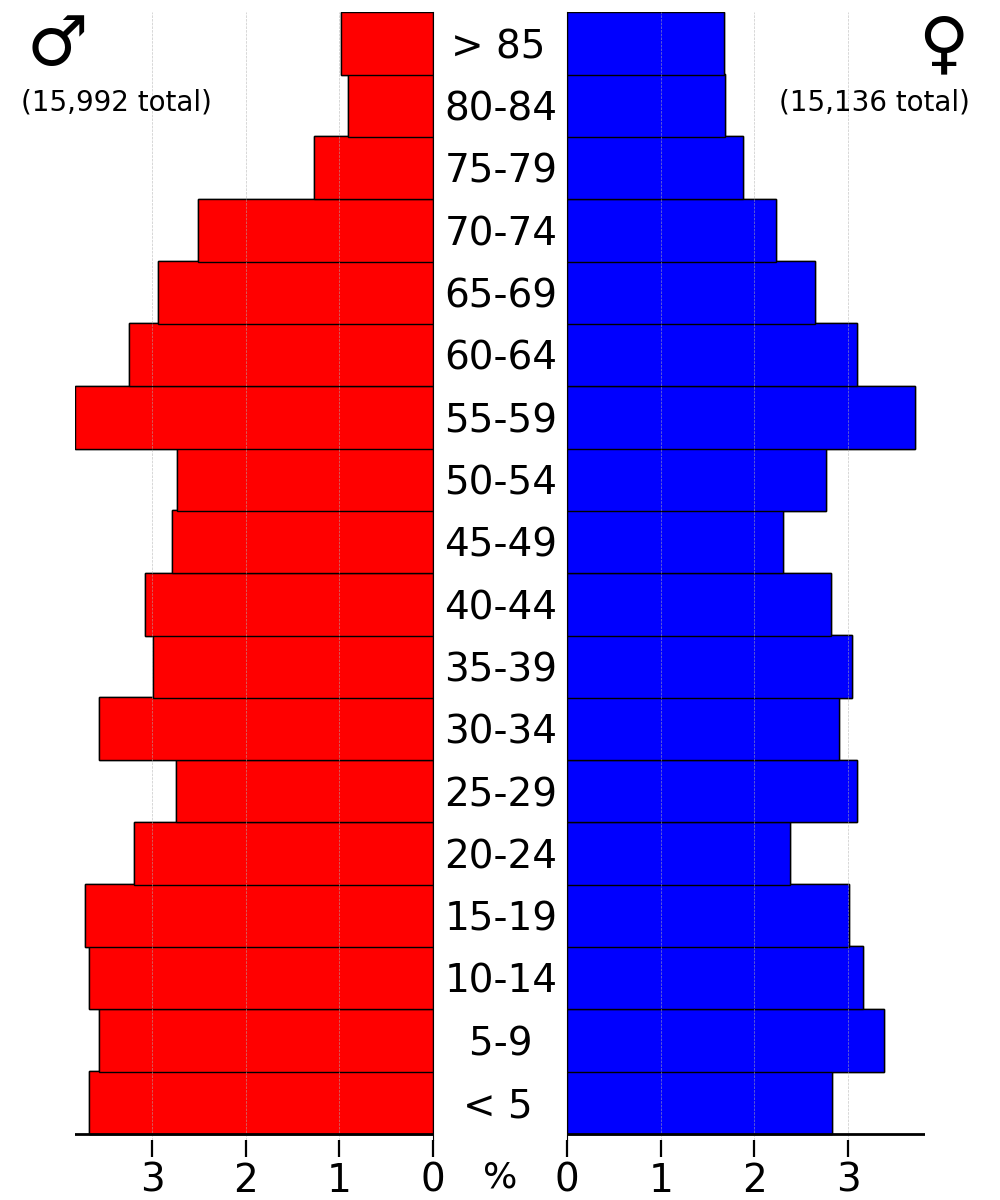
2022 US Census population pyramid for Polk County, from ACS 5-year estimates

As of the 2024 estimate, there were 30,413 people and 12,448 households residing in the county. There were 14,785 housing units at an average density of 0.0 per square mile (0.0/km^{2}). The racial makeup of the county was 91.5% White (85.8% NH White), 2.8% African American, 2.1% Native American, 1.0% Asian, 0.1% Pacific Islander, _% from some other races and 2.6% from two or more races. Hispanic or Latino people of any race were 7.0% of the population.

=== 2020 census ===
As of the 2020 census, the county had a population of 31,192. The median age was 39.3 years. 24.6% of residents were under the age of 18 and 19.0% of residents were 65 years of age or older. For every 100 females there were 100.4 males, and for every 100 females age 18 and over there were 98.9 males age 18 and over.

The racial makeup of the county was 87.3% White, 3.1% Black or African American, 1.5% American Indian and Alaska Native, 0.5% Asian, <0.1% Native Hawaiian and Pacific Islander, 2.0% from some other race, and 5.6% from two or more races. Hispanic or Latino residents of any race comprised 6.4% of the population.

53.5% of residents lived in urban areas, while 46.5% lived in rural areas.

There were 12,534 households in the county, of which 28.5% had children under the age of 18 living in them. Of all households, 48.8% were married-couple households, 20.7% were households with a male householder and no spouse or partner present, and 23.7% were households with a female householder and no spouse or partner present. About 31.8% of all households were made up of individuals and 13.9% had someone living alone who was 65 years of age or older.

There were 14,623 housing units, of which 14.3% were vacant. Among occupied housing units, 72.1% were owner-occupied and 27.9% were renter-occupied. The homeowner vacancy rate was 1.5% and the rental vacancy rate was 11.0%.

=== 2010 census ===
As of the 2010 census, there were 31,600 people, 12,704 households, and 8,196 families residing in the county. The population density was 16.0 inhabitants per square mile (6.2/km^{2}). There were 14,610 housing units at an average density of 7.41 inhabitants per square mile (2.9/km^{2}). The racial makeup of the county was 93.34% White, 0.85% African American, 1.43% Native American, 0.69% Asian, 0.01% Pacific Islander, 1.57% from some other races and 2.10% from two or more races. Hispanic or Latino people of any race were 5.44% of the population.

=== 2000 census ===
As of the 2000 census, there were 31,369 people, 12,070 households, and 8,050 families residing in the county. The population density was 15.9 inhabitants per square mile (6.1/km^{2}). There were 14,008 housing units at an average density of 7.11 inhabitants per square mile (2.7/km^{2}). The racial makeup of the county was 94.18% White, 0.33% African American, 1.30% Native American, 0.30% Asian, 0.00% Pacific Islander, 1.30% from some other races and 2.77% from two or more races. Hispanic or Latino people of any race were 4.79% of the population.

In terms of ancestry, 41.7% were Norwegians, 19.7% were Germans, and 5.8% were French.

There were 12,070 households, 32.3% had children under 18 living with them, 54.9% were married couples living together, 8.5% had a female householder with no husband present, and 33.3% were not families. About 28.9% of all households were made up of individuals, and 13.8% had someone living alone who was 65 or older. The average household size was 2.47, and the average family size was 3.07.

The county's age distribution was 25.9% under 18, 9.7% from 18 to 24, 24.8% from 25 to 44, 22.2% from 45 to 64, and 17.4% who were 65 or older. The median age was 38. For every 100 females, there were 98.1 males. For every 100 females 18 and over, there were 95.5 males.

The median income for a household was $35,105, and for a family was $44,310. Males had a median income of $31,472 versus $21,535 for females. The per capita income was $17,279. About 7.3% of families and 10.9% of the population were below the poverty line, including 13.3% of those under age 18 and 10.9% of those 65 or over.

== Communities ==
=== Cities ===
- Beltrami
- Climax
- Crookston (county seat)
- East Grand Forks
- Erskine
- Fertile
- Fisher
- Fosston
- Gully
- Lengby
- McIntosh
- Mentor
- Nielsville
- Trail
- Winger

=== Unincorporated communities ===
- Benoit
- Cisco
- Dugdale
- Euclid
- Greenview
- Maple Bay
- Olga
- Sherack
- Tabor

Townships of Polk County

=== Townships ===
- Andover Township
- Angus Township
- Badger Township
- Belgium Township
- Brandsvold Township
- Brandt Township
- Brislet Township
- Bygland Township
- Chester Township
- Columbia Township
- Crookston Township
- Eden Township
- Esther Township
- Euclid Township
- Fairfax Township
- Fanny Township
- Farley Township
- Fisher Township
- Garden Township
- Garfield Township
- Gentilly Township
- Godfrey Township
- Grand Forks Township
- Grove Park-Tilden Township
- Gully Township
- Hammond Township
- Helgeland Township
- Higdem Township
- Hill River Township
- Hubbard Township
- Huntsville Township
- Johnson Township
- Kertsonville Township
- Keystone Township
- King Township
- Knute Township
- Lessor Township
- Liberty Township
- Lowell Township
- Nesbit Township
- Northland Township
- Onstad Township
- Parnell Township
- Queen Township
- Reis Township
- Rhinehart Township
- Roome Township
- Rosebud Township
- Russia Township
- Sandsville Township
- Scandia Township
- Sletten Township
- Sullivan Township
- Tabor Township
- Tynsid Township
- Vineland Township
- Winger Township
- Woodside Township

== Government and politics ==
Polk County was a swing county for several decades, before shifting solidly Republican as of lately. As of 2020, it has selected the Republican nominee in presidential elections in 56% of elections since 1980.

United States presidential election results for Polk County, Minnesota
Year	Republican		Democratic		Third party(ies)	
Year	No.	%	No.	%	No.	%
1892	1,376	23.35%	1,510	25.63%	3,006	51.02%
1896	2,855	35.39%	5,054	62.65%	158	1.96%
1900	2,863	49.62%	2,533	43.90%	374	6.48%
1904	3,549	71.71%	696	14.06%	704	14.23%
1908	3,311	55.21%	1,928	32.15%	758	12.64%
1912	735	12.79%	1,662	28.92%	3,350	58.29%
1916	2,471	37.93%	3,498	53.70%	545	8.37%
1920	8,197	69.47%	2,111	17.89%	1,492	12.64%
1924	5,027	43.94%	663	5.80%	5,750	50.26%
1928	7,215	56.08%	5,357	41.64%	294	2.29%
1932	3,604	27.32%	8,751	66.35%	835	6.33%
1936	3,751	24.30%	11,337	73.44%	349	2.26%
1940	5,200	32.53%	10,652	66.64%	133	0.83%
1944	4,402	33.07%	8,808	66.18%	100	0.75%
1948	4,662	31.98%	9,279	63.64%	639	4.38%
1952	8,326	53.09%	7,244	46.19%	113	0.72%
1956	6,847	46.10%	7,980	53.73%	26	0.18%
1960	7,528	44.52%	9,346	55.27%	35	0.21%
1964	5,039	31.28%	11,052	68.60%	20	0.12%
1968	6,074	40.04%	8,380	55.24%	715	4.71%
1972	8,139	51.24%	7,366	46.37%	380	2.39%
1976	6,552	40.86%	9,078	56.62%	404	2.52%
1980	9,036	51.21%	7,151	40.53%	1,457	8.26%
1984	8,617	54.60%	7,033	44.56%	132	0.84%
1988	7,032	47.96%	7,523	51.31%	107	0.73%
1992	5,817	38.95%	5,850	39.17%	3,267	21.88%
1996	5,563	40.94%	6,369	46.88%	1,655	12.18%
2000	7,609	53.81%	5,764	40.76%	767	5.42%
2004	8,724	55.68%	6,729	42.95%	215	1.37%
2008	7,148	46.62%	7,850	51.19%	336	2.19%
2012	7,615	51.83%	6,773	46.10%	305	2.08%
2016	8,979	60.69%	4,712	31.85%	1,105	7.47%
2020	9,865	63.26%	5,439	34.88%	290	1.86%
2024	10,162	65.91%	4,967	32.21%	290	1.88%

County Board of Commissioners
Position	Name	District	Next Election
Commissioner	Paul Reese	District 1	2028
Commissioner and Vice Chair	Warren Strandell	District 2	2026
Commissioner	Gary Willhite	District 3	2028
Commissioner and Chair	Joan Lee	District 4	2026
Commissioner	Ross Pape	District 5	2028

State Legislature (2025-2027)
Position	Name	Affiliation	District
Senate	Mark Johnson	Republican	District 1
House of Representatives	Steve Gander	Republican	District 1B

U.S Congress (2025-2027)
Position	Name	Affiliation	District
House of Representatives	Michelle Fischbach	Republican	7th
Senate	Amy Klobuchar	Democrat	N/A
Senate	Tina Smith	Democrat	N/A

== Education ==
School districts include:

- Clearbrook-Gonvick School District ISD #2311
- Climax-Shelly Public Schools ISD #592
- Crookston School District 593 (Crookston High School)
- East Grand Forks Public School District ISD #595 (East Grand Forks Senior High School)
- Fertile-Beltrami School District ISD #599
- Fisher Public School District ISD #600
- Fosston Public School District ISD #601
- Red Lake County Central Public Schools ISD #2906
- Red Lake Falls Public School District ISD #630
- Warren-Alvarado-Oslo School District ISD #2176
- Win-E-Mac School District ISD #2609

== See also ==
- National Register of Historic Places listings in Polk County, Minnesota
