= Garden Township, Polk County, Minnesota =

Garden Township, Minnesota
- Township
- Location of Garden Township, within Polk County, Minnesota
- Coordinates: 47°32′53″N 96°7′15″W
- Country: United States
- State: Minnesota
- County: Polk

Area
  - Total: 35.6 sq mi (92.3 km^{2})
  - Land: 33.8 sq mi (87.5 km^{2})
  - Water: 1.9 sq mi (4.8 km^{2})
- Elevation: 1,198 ft (365 m)

Population (2020)
  - Total: 220
  - Density: 6.5/sq mi (2.5/km^{2})
- Time zone: UTC-6 (Central (CST))
  - Summer (DST): UTC-5 (CDT)
- FIPS code: 27-23066
- GNIS feature ID: 0664242

Garden Township is a township in Polk County, Minnesota, United States. It is part of the Grand Forks-ND-MN Metropolitan Statistical Area. The population was 220 at the 2020 census.

== History ==
Garden Township was organized in 1881, and named for their fertile soil.

== Geography ==
According to the United States Census Bureau, the township has a total area of 35.6 square miles (92 km^{2}), of which 33.8 square miles (88 km^{2}) is land and 1.8 square miles (4.7 km^{2}) (5.16%) is water. There are many small lakes found across the township, mostly from 40 to 150 acres (0.61 km^{2}) in size.

== Demographics ==
As of the census of 2000, there were 227 people, 84 households, and 65 families residing in the township. The population density was 6.7 inhabitants per square mile (2.6/km^{2}). There were 109 housing units at an average density of 3.2 per square mile (1.2/km^{2}). The racial makeup of the township was 100.00% White.

There were 84 households, out of which 32.1% had children under the age of 18 living with them, 71.4% were married couples living together, 4.8% had a female householder with no husband present, and 22.6% were non-families. 19.0% of all households were made up of individuals, and 4.8% had someone living alone who was 65 years of age or older. The average household size was 2.70 and the average family size was 3.08.

In the township the population was spread out, with 28.2% under the age of 18, 5.7% from 18 to 24, 23.3% from 25 to 44, 30.4% from 45 to 64, and 12.3% who were 65 years of age or older. The median age was 42 years. For every 100 females, there were 124.8 males. For every 100 females age 18 and over, there were 117.3 males.

The median income for a household in the township was $39,583, and the median income for a family was $48,750. Males had a median income of $23,750 versus $26,250 for females. The per capita income for the township was $16,056. About 1.5% of families and 7.8% of the population were below the poverty line, including 18.9% of those under the age of eighteen and 10.3% of those 65 or over.
