= Higdem Township, Polk County, Minnesota =

Higdem Township, Minnesota
- Township
- Location of Higdem Township, within Polk County, Minnesota
- Coordinates: 48°8′39″N 97°4′28″W
- Country: United States
- State: Minnesota
- County: Polk

Area
  - Total: 23.4 sq mi (60.6 km^{2})
  - Land: 23.2 sq mi (60.2 km^{2})
  - Water: 0.15 sq mi (0.4 km^{2})
- Elevation: 817 ft (249 m)

Population (2020)
  - Total: 83
  - Density: 3.6/sq mi (1.4/km^{2})
- Time zone: UTC-6 (Central (CST))
  - Summer (DST): UTC-5 (CDT)
- FIPS code: 27-28844
- GNIS feature ID: 0664467

Higdem Township is a township in Polk County, Minnesota, United States. It is part of the Grand Forks-ND-MN Metropolitan Statistical Area. The population was 83 at the 2020 census.

Higdem Township was organized in 1879, and named for Arne O. Higdem, a county official.

== Geography ==
According to the United States Census Bureau, the township has a total area of 23.4 square miles (61 km^{2}), of which 23.2 square miles (60 km^{2}) is land and 0.2 square miles (0.52 km^{2}) (0.68%) is water.

== Demographics ==
As of the census of 2000, there were 99 people, 37 households, and 28 families residing in the township. The population density was 4.3 inhabitants per square mile (1.7/km^{2}). There were 38 housing units at an average density of 1.6 per square mile (0.62/km^{2}). The racial makeup of the township was 96.97% White, 3.03% from other races. Hispanic or Latino of any race were 3.03% of the population.

There were 37 households, out of which 35.1% had children under the age of 18 living with them, 70.3% were married couples living together, 2.7% had a female householder with no husband present, and 24.3% were non-families. 21.6% of all households were made up of individuals, and 2.7% had someone living alone who was 65 years of age or older. The average household size was 2.68 and the average family size was 3.11.

In the township the population was spread out, with 27.3% under the age of 18, 9.1% from 18 to 24, 34.3% from 25 to 44, 20.2% from 45 to 64, and 9.1% who were 65 years of age or older. The median age was 34 years. For every 100 females, there were 130.2 males. For every 100 females age 18 and over, there were 118.2 males.

The median income for a household in the township was $46,563, and the median income for a family was $52,500. Males had a median income of $41,250 versus $20,938 for females. The per capita income for the township was $18,333. There were 13.3% of families and 10.3% of the population living below the poverty line, including 10.0% of under eighteens and none of those over 64.
