= Rosebud Township, Polk County, Minnesota =

Rosebud Township, Minnesota
- Township
- Location of Rosebud Township, within Polk County, Minnesota
- Coordinates: 47°33′2″N 95°44′11″W
- Country: United States
- State: Minnesota
- County: Polk

Area
  - Total: 35.1 sq mi (90.8 km^{2})
  - Land: 32.9 sq mi (85.3 km^{2})
  - Water: 2.1 sq mi (5.5 km^{2})
- Elevation: 1,276 ft (389 m)

Population (2020)
  - Total: 310
  - Density: 9.4/sq mi (3.6/km^{2})
- Time zone: UTC-6 (Central (CST))
  - Summer (DST): UTC-5 (CDT)
- FIPS code: 27-55564
- GNIS feature ID: 0665460

Rosebud Township is a township in Polk County, Minnesota, United States. It is part of the Grand Forks-ND-MN Metropolitan Statistical Area. The population was 310 at the 2020 census.

According to Warren Upham, Rosebud Township may have been named for the wild roses growing there.

== Geography ==
According to the United States Census Bureau, the township has a total area of 35.0 square miles (90.8 km^{2}), of which 32.9 square miles (85.3 km^{2}) is land and 2.1 square miles (5.5 km^{2}) (6.05%) is water.

== Demographics ==
As of the census of 2000, there were 343 people, 125 households, and 98 families residing in the township. The population density was 10.4 people per square mile (4.0/km^{2}). There were 135 housing units at an average density of 4.1/sq mi (1.6/km^{2}). The racial makeup of the township was 90.38% White, 1.46% African American, 2.04% Native American, 0.58% Asian, 1.75% from other races, and 3.79% from two or more races. Hispanic or Latino of any race were 2.62% of the population.

There were 125 households, out of which 38.4% had children under the age of 18 living with them, 68.8% were married couples living together, 8.0% had a female householder with no husband present, and 20.8% were non-families. 18.4% of all households were made up of individuals, and 6.4% had someone living alone who was 65 years of age or older. The average household size was 2.72 and the average family size was 3.06.

In the township the population was spread out, with 29.4% under the age of 18, 8.2% from 18 to 24, 24.8% from 25 to 44, 25.7% from 45 to 64, and 12.0% who were 65 years of age or older. The median age was 38 years. For every 100 females, there were 99.4 males. For every 100 females age 18 and over, there were 106.8 males.

The median income for a household in the township was $28,281, and the median income for a family was $29,750. Males had a median income of $21,607 versus $22,969 for females. The per capita income for the township was $13,677. About 7.2% of families and 11.6% of the population were below the poverty line, including 21.2% of those under age 18 and 5.6% of those age 65 or over.
