= Gully Township, Polk County, Minnesota =

Gully Township, Minnesota
- Township
- Location of Gully Township, within Polk County, Minnesota
- Coordinates: 47°47′51″N 95°39′36″W
- Country: United States
- State: Minnesota
- County: Polk

Area
  - Total: 32.9 sq mi (85.1 km^{2})
  - Land: 32.9 sq mi (85.1 km^{2})
  - Water: 0 sq mi (0.0 km^{2})
- Elevation: 1,161 ft (354 m)

Population (2020)
  - Total: 136
  - Density: 4.14/sq mi (1.60/km^{2})
- Time zone: UTC-6 (Central (CST))
  - Summer (DST): UTC-5 (CDT)
- ZIP code: 56646
- Area code: 218
- FIPS code: 27-26288
- GNIS feature ID: 0664364

Gully Township is a township in Polk County, Minnesota, United States. It is part of the Grand Forks-ND-MN Metropolitan Statistical Area. The population was 136 at the 2020 census.

Gully Township was named for a gully within its borders.

== Geography ==
According to the United States Census Bureau, the township has a total area of 32.8 square miles (85 km^{2}), all land.

== Demographics ==
As of the census of 2000, there were 99 people, 39 households, and 29 families residing in the township. The population density was 3.0 inhabitants per square mile (1.2/km^{2}). There were 49 housing units at an average density of 1.5 per square mile (0.58/km^{2}). The racial makeup of the township was 91.92% White, 1.01% Native American, 4.04% Asian, and 3.03% from two or more races.

There were 39 households, out of which 25.6% had children under the age of 18 living with them, 76.9% were married couples living together, and 23.1% were non-families. 20.5% of all households were made up of individuals, and 5.1% had someone living alone who was 65 years of age or older. The average household size was 2.54 and the average family size was 2.97.

In the township the population was spread out, with 21.2% under the age of 18, 10.1% from 18 to 24, 19.2% from 25 to 44, 34.3% from 45 to 64, and 15.2% who were 65 years of age or older. The median age was 44 years. For every 100 females, there were 120.0 males. For every 100 females age 18 and over, there were 110.8 males.

The median income for a household in the township was $23,750, and the median income for a family was $26,875. Males had a median income of $21,250 versus $13,750 for females. The per capita income for the township was $13,039. There were no families and 4.7% of the population living below the poverty line, including no under-eighteens and 25.0% of those over 64.
