= Gully, Minnesota =

City in Minnesota, United States

- City
- Location of Gully, Minnesota
- Coordinates: 47°46′06″N 95°37′29″W
- Country: United States
- State: Minnesota
- County: Polk
- Incorporated: July 16, 1924

Government
  - Mayor: Cathy Bergerson

Area
  - Total: 0.246 sq mi (0.637 km^{2})
  - Land: 0.246 sq mi (0.637 km^{2})
  - Water: 0 sq mi (0.000 km^{2})
- Elevation: 1,273 ft (388 m)

Population (2020)
  - Total: 59
  - Estimate (2022): 55
  - Density: 239.8/sq mi (92.58/km^{2})
- Time zone: UTC−6 (Central (CST))
  - Summer (DST): UTC−5 (CDT)
- ZIP Code: 56646
- Area code: 218
- FIPS code: 27-26270
- GNIS feature ID: 2394260
- Sales tax: 7.125%

Gully is a city in Polk County, Minnesota, United States. It is part of the Grand Forks-ND-MN Metropolitan Statistical Area. The population was 59 at the 2020 census.

== History ==
A post office called Gully has been in operation since 1896. The city was named for a gully near the town site.

== Geography ==
According to the United States Census Bureau, the city has a total area of 0.246 square miles (0.64 km^{2}), all land.

Gully is along State Highway 92 (MN 92) and Polk County Road 2.

== Politics ==
In the 2020 presidential election, the city of Gully was tied, with 15 votes each to Joe Biden and Donald Trump.

== Demographics ==
Historical population
Census	Pop.	Note	%±
1930	138		—
1940	164		18.8%
1950	183		11.6%
1960	168		−8.2%
1970	96		−42.9%
1980	116		20.8%
1990	117		0.9%
2000	106		−9.4%
2010	66		−37.7%
2020	59		−10.6%
2022 (est.)	55		−6.8%
U.S. Decennial Census; 2020 Census

=== 2010 census ===
As of the 2010 census, there were 66 people, 38 households, and 15 families living in the city. The population density was 253.8 inhabitants per square mile (98.0/km^{2}). There were 53 housing units at an average density of 203.8 per square mile (78.7/km^{2}). The racial makeup of the city was 100.0% White.

There were 38 households, of which 23.7% had children under the age of 18 living with them, 26.3% were married couples living together, 7.9% had a female householder with no husband present, 5.3% had a male householder with no wife present, and 60.5% were non-families. 57.9% of all households were made up of individuals, and 23.7% had someone living alone who was 65 years of age or older. The average household size was 1.74 and the average family size was 2.73.

The median age in the city was 47 years. 22.7% of residents were under the age of 18; 4.5% were between the ages of 18 and 24; 21.1% were from 25 to 44; 24.3% were from 45 to 64; and 27.3% were 65 years of age or older. The gender makeup of the city was 54.5% male and 45.5% female.

=== 2000 census ===
As of the 2000 census, there were 106 people, 52 households, and 26 families living in the city. The population density was 52.7 inhabitants per square mile (20.3/km^{2}). There were 66 housing units at an average density of 32.8 per square mile (12.7/km^{2}). The racial makeup of the city was 99.06% White, and 0.94% from two or more races.

There were 52 households, out of which 23.1% had children under the age of 18 living with them, 46.2% were married couples living together, 3.8% had a female householder with no husband present, and 48.1% were non-families. 44.2% of all households were made up of individuals, and 17.3% had someone living alone who was 65 years of age or older. The average household size was 2.04 and the average family size was 2.93.

In the city, the population was spread out, with 23.6% under the age of 18, 2.8% from 18 to 24, 25.5% from 25 to 44, 23.6% from 45 to 64, and 24.5% who were 65 years of age or older. The median age was 43 years. For every 100 females, there were 120.8 males. For every 100 females age 18 and over, there were 118.9 males.

The median income for a household in the city was $17,500, and the median income for a family was $21,875. Males had a median income of $21,250 versus $17,917 for females. The per capita income for the city was $11,644. There were 14.8% of families and 16.8% of the population living below the poverty line, including no under eighteens and 17.2% of those over 64.
