= Vineland Township, Polk County, Minnesota =

Vineland Township, Minnesota
- Township
- Location of Vineland Township, within Polk County, Minnesota
- Coordinates: 47°38′12″N 96°48′15″W
- Country: United States
- State: Minnesota
- County: Polk

Area
  - Total: 45.8 sq mi (118.7 km^{2})
  - Land: 45.8 sq mi (118.7 km^{2})
  - Water: 0 sq mi (0.0 km^{2})
- Elevation: 869 ft (265 m)

Population (2020)
  - Total: 89
  - Density: 1.9/sq mi (0.75/km^{2})
- Time zone: UTC-6 (Central (CST))
  - Summer (DST): UTC-5 (CDT)
- FIPS code: 27-67198
- GNIS feature ID: 0665876

Vineland Township is a township in Polk County, Minnesota, United States. It is part of the Grand Forks-ND-MN Metropolitan Statistical Area. The population was 89 at the 2020 census.

Vineland Township was organized in 1876, and named after the region of Vinland.

== Geography ==
According to the United States Census Bureau, the township has a total area of 45.8 square miles (118.7 km^{2}), all land.

== Demographics ==
At the 2000 census there were 133 people in 38 households, including 31 families, in the township. The population density was 2.9 people per square mile (1.1/km^{2}). There were 45 housing units at an average density of 1.0/sq mi (0.4/km^{2}). The racial makeup of the township was 89.47% White, 5.26% African American, 0.75% Native American, 4.51% from other races. Hispanic or Latino of any race were 8.27%.

Of the 38 households 42.1% had children under the age of 18 living with them, 71.1% were married couples living together, 10.5% had a female householder with no husband present, and 15.8% were non-families. 13.2% of households were one person and 13.2% were one person aged 65 or older. The average household size was 3.50 and the average family size was 3.81.

The age distribution was 32.3% under the age of 18, 10.5% from 18 to 24, 19.5% from 25 to 44, 21.8% from 45 to 64, and 15.8% 65 or older. The median age was 36 years. For every 100 females, there were 95.6 males. For every 100 females age 18 and over, there were 114.3 males.

The median household income was $27,500 and the median family income was $31,250. Males had a median income of $12,222 versus $19,375 for females. The per capita income for the township was $11,180. There were 16.7% of families and 22.1% of the population living below the poverty line, including 42.1% of under eighteens and 8.7% of those over 64.
