= Euclid Township, Polk County, Minnesota =

Euclid Township, Minnesota
- Township
- Location of Euclid Township, within Polk County, Minnesota
- Coordinates: 47°58′14″N 96°40′0″W
- Country: United States
- State: Minnesota
- County: Polk

Area
  - Total: 35.6 sq mi (92.1 km^{2})
  - Land: 35.6 sq mi (92.1 km^{2})
  - Water: 0 sq mi (0.0 km^{2})
- Elevation: 883 ft (269 m)

Population (2020)
  - Total: 134
  - Density: 3.77/sq mi (1.45/km^{2})
- Time zone: UTC-6 (Central (CST))
  - Summer (DST): UTC-5 (CDT)
- ZIP code: 56722
- Area code: 218
- FIPS code: 27-19862
- GNIS feature ID: 0664112

Euclid Township is a township in Polk County, Minnesota, United States. It is part of the Grand Forks-ND-MN Metropolitan Statistical Area. The population was 134 at the 2020 census.

Euclid Township was organized in 1879, and named after Euclid Avenue, a main boulevard of Cleveland, Ohio.

== Geography ==
According to the United States Census Bureau, the township has a total area of 35.6 square miles (92 km^{2}), all land.

== Demographics ==
As of the census of 2000, there were 149 people, 59 households, and 46 families residing in the township. The population density was 4.2 inhabitants per square mile (1.6/km^{2}). There were 65 housing units at an average density of 1.8 per square mile (0.69/km^{2}). The racial makeup of the township was 100.00% White.

There were 59 households, out of which 22.0% had children under the age of 18 living with them, 64.4% were married couples living together, 3.4% had a female householder with no husband present, and 22.0% were non-families. 16.9% of all households were made up of individuals, and 11.9% had someone living alone who was 65 years of age or older. The average household size was 2.53 and the average family size was 2.83.

In the township the population was spread out, with 16.8% under the age of 18, 14.8% from 18 to 24, 20.8% from 25 to 44, 27.5% from 45 to 64, and 20.1% who were 65 years of age or older. The median age was 44 years. For every 100 females, there were 106.9 males. For every 100 females age 18 and over, there were 106.7 males.

The median income for a household in the township was $48,438, and the median income for a family was $49,375. Males had a median income of $40,833 versus $17,917 for females. The per capita income for the township was $19,901. There were none of the families and 4.0% of the population living below the poverty line, including no under eighteens and none of those over 64.
