= King Township, Polk County, Minnesota =

King Township, Minnesota
- Township
- Location of King Township, within Polk County, Minnesota
- Coordinates: 47°37′45″N 95°52′24″W
- Country: United States
- State: Minnesota
- County: Polk

Area
  - Total: 35.3 sq mi (91.4 km^{2})
  - Land: 34.9 sq mi (90.5 km^{2})
  - Water: 0.35 sq mi (0.9 km^{2})
- Elevation: 1,210 ft (370 m)

Population (2020)
  - Total: 225
  - Density: 6.44/sq mi (2.49/km^{2})
- Time zone: UTC-6 (Central (CST))
  - Summer (DST): UTC-5 (CDT)
- FIPS code: 27-33254
- GNIS feature ID: 0664635

King Township is a township in Polk County, Minnesota, United States. It is part of the Grand Forks-ND-MN Metropolitan Statistical Area. The population was 225 at the 2020 census.

King Township was named for Ephraim King, a pioneer settler.

== Geography ==
According to the United States Census Bureau, the township has a total area of 35.3 square miles (91 km^{2}), of which 35.0 square miles (91 km^{2}) is land and 0.3 square miles (0.78 km^{2}) (0.96%) is water.

== Demographics ==
As of the census of 2000, there were 195 people, 76 households, and 56 families residing in the township. The population density was 5.6 inhabitants per square mile (2.2/km^{2}). There were 82 housing units at an average density of 2.3 per square mile (0.89/km^{2}). The racial makeup of the township was 100.00% White.

There were 76 households, out of which 34.2% had children under the age of 18 living with them, 61.8% were married couples living together, 6.6% had a female householder with no husband present, and 26.3% were non-families. 25.0% of all households were made up of individuals, and 13.2% had someone living alone who was 65 years of age or older. The average household size was 2.57 and the average family size was 3.11.

In the township the population was spread out, with 25.6% under the age of 18, 8.7% from 18 to 24, 23.1% from 25 to 44, 27.7% from 45 to 64, and 14.9% who were 65 years of age or older. The median age was 40 years. For every 100 females, there were 116.7 males. For every 100 females age 18 and over, there were 113.2 males.

The median income for a household in the township was $40,833, and the median income for a family was $57,500. Males had a median income of $27,083 versus $21,389 for females. The per capita income for the township was $21,211. About 5.6% of families and 4.6% of the population were below the poverty line, including 12.1% of those under the age of eighteen and 5.1% of those 65 or over.
