= Russia Township, Minnesota =

- Township
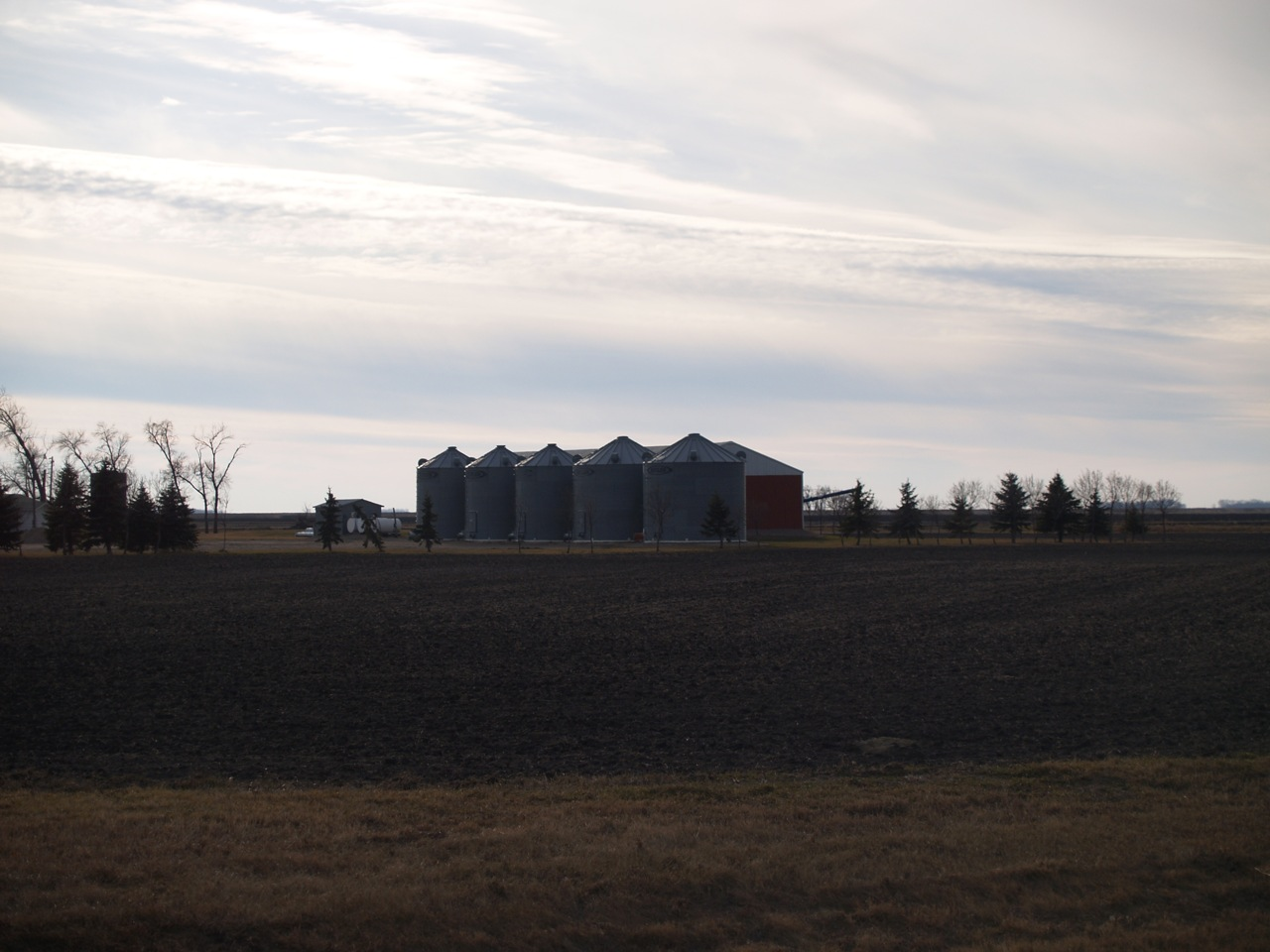
- Grain elevators at Greenview

- Location of Russia Township, within Polk County, Minnesota
- Coordinates: 47°37′19″N 96°31′32″W
- Country: United States
- State: Minnesota
- County: Polk

Area
  - Total: 36.1 sq mi (93.6 km^{2})
  - Land: 36.1 sq mi (93.6 km^{2})
  - Water: 0 sq mi (0.0 km^{2})
- Elevation: 899 ft (274 m)

Population (2020)
  - Total: 29
  - Density: 0.80/sq mi (0.31/km^{2})
- Time zone: UTC-6 (Central (CST))
  - Summer (DST): UTC-5 (CDT)
- FIPS code: 27-56446
- GNIS feature ID: 0665493

Russia Township is a township in Polk County, Minnesota, United States. It is part of the Grand Forks, ND-MN metropolitan Statistical Area. The population of the township was 29 at the 2020 census. The unincorporated community of Greenview is located within Russia Township.

Russia Township was organized in 1882, and named after the country of Russia.

== Geography ==
According to the United States Census Bureau, the township has a total area of 36.1 square miles (93.6 km^{2}), all land.

Minnesota Highway 9 serves as a main route in the township.

== Demographics ==
As of the census of 2000, there were 33 people, 15 households, and 10 families residing in the township. The population density was 0.9 people per square mile (0.4/km^{2}). There were 16 housing units at an average density of 0.4/sq mi (0.2/km^{2}). The racial makeup of the township was 96.97% White, 3.03% from other races. Hispanic or Latino of any race were 3.03% of the population.

There were 15 households, out of which 20.0% had children under the age of 18 living with them, 53.3% were married couples living together, 6.7% had a female householder with no husband present, and 26.7% were non-families. 26.7% of all households were made up of individuals, and 13.3% had someone living alone who was 65 years of age or older. The average household size was 2.20 and the average family size was 2.64.

In the township the population was spread out, with 24.2% under the age of 18, 6.1% from 18 to 24, 18.2% from 25 to 44, 30.3% from 45 to 64, and 21.2% who were 65 years of age or older. The median age was 46 years. For every 100 females, there were 94.1 males. For every 100 females age 18 and over, there were 92.3 males.

The median income for a household in the township was $43,125, and the median income for a family was $43,750. Males had a median income of $61,250 versus $23,750 for females. The per capita income for the township was $21,970. There were 20.0% of families and 21.2% of the population living below the poverty line, including 55.6% of under eighteens and none of those over 64.
