= Godfrey Township, Polk County, Minnesota =

Godfrey Township, Minnesota
- Township
- Location of Godfrey Township, within Polk County, Minnesota
- Coordinates: 47°38′5″N 96°13′32″W
- Country: United States
- State: Minnesota
- County: Polk

Area
  - Total: 35.9 sq mi (93.1 km^{2})
  - Land: 34.5 sq mi (89.3 km^{2})
  - Water: 1.5 sq mi (3.8 km^{2})
- Elevation: 1,152 ft (351 m)

Population (2020)
  - Total: 294
  - Density: 8.53/sq mi (3.29/km^{2})
- Time zone: UTC-6 (Central (CST))
  - Summer (DST): UTC-5 (CDT)
- FIPS code: 27-24254
- GNIS feature ID: 0664285

Godfrey Township is a township in Polk County, Minnesota, United States. It is part of the Grand Forks-ND-MN Metropolitan Statistical Area. The population was 294 at the 2020 census.

Godfrey Township was organized in 1881, and named for Warren N. Godfrey, a pioneer settler.

== Geography ==
According to the United States Census Bureau, the township has a total area of 35.9 square miles (93 km^{2}), of which 34.5 square miles (89 km^{2}) is land and 1.5 square miles (3.9 km^{2}) (4.12%) is water.

== Demographics ==
As of the census of 2000, there were 327 people, 124 households, and 98 families residing in the township. The population density was 9.5 inhabitants per square mile (3.7/km^{2}). There were 291 housing units at an average density of 8.4 per square mile (3.2/km^{2}). The racial makeup of the township was 99.39% White, and 0.61% from two or more races.

There were 124 households, out of which 31.5% had children under the age of 18 living with them, 73.4% were married couples living together, 4.8% had a female householder with no husband present, and 20.2% were non-families. 16.9% of all households were made up of individuals, and 9.7% had someone living alone who was 65 years of age or older. The average household size was 2.64 and the average family size was 2.96.

In the township the population was spread out, with 24.5% under the age of 18, 8.3% from 18 to 24, 19.0% from 25 to 44, 27.5% from 45 to 64, and 20.8% who were 65 years of age or older. The median age was 44 years. For every 100 females, there were 100.6 males. For every 100 females age 18 and over, there were 97.6 males.

The median income for a household in the township was $42,273, and the median income for a family was $47,500. Males had a median income of $29,583 versus $26,667 for females. The per capita income for the township was $25,283. About 2.2% of families and 1.9% of the population were below the poverty line, including none of those under age 18 and 4.2% of those age 65 or over.
