= Northland Township, Polk County, Minnesota =

Northland Township, Minnesota
- Township
- Location of Northland Township, within Polk County, Minnesota
- Coordinates: 48°3′51″N 96°57′36″W
- Country: United States
- State: Minnesota
- County: Polk

Area
  - Total: 36.1 sq mi (93.6 km^{2})
  - Land: 36.1 sq mi (93.6 km^{2})
  - Water: 0 sq mi (0.0 km^{2})
- Elevation: 827 ft (252 m)

Population (2020)
  - Total: 151
  - Density: 4.18/sq mi (1.61/km^{2})
- Time zone: UTC-6 (Central (CST))
  - Summer (DST): UTC-5 (CDT)
- FIPS code: 27-47032
- GNIS feature ID: 0665159

Northland Township is a township in Polk County, Minnesota, United States. It is part of the Grand Forks-ND-MN Metropolitan Statistical Area. According to the 2020 census the population was 151.

The name Northland alludes to Norway, the homeland of a large share of the early settlers.

== Geography ==
According to the United States Census Bureau, the township has a total area of 36.2 square miles (93.6 km^{2}), all land.

== Demographics ==
As of the census of 2000, there were 196 people, 69 households, and 58 families residing in the township. The population density was 5.4 people per square mile (2.1/km^{2}). There were 76 housing units at an average density of 2.1/sq mi (0.8/km^{2}). The racial makeup of the township was 99.49% White, and 0.51% from two or more races. Hispanic or Latino of any race were 0.51% of the population.

There were 69 households, out of which 37.7% had children under the age of 18 living with them, 71.0% were married couples living together, 10.1% had a female householder with no husband present, and 15.9% were non-families. 15.9% of all households were made up of individuals, and 11.6% had someone living alone who was 65 years of age or older. The average household size was 2.84 and the average family size was 3.19.

In the township the population was spread out, with 27.0% under the age of 18, 8.7% from 18 to 24, 22.4% from 25 to 44, 21.9% from 45 to 64, and 19.9% who were 65 years of age or older. The median age was 40 years. For every 100 females, there were 106.3 males. For every 100 females age 18 and over, there were 110.3 males.

The median income for a household in the township was $38,333, and the median income for a family was $42,500. Males had a median income of $36,500 versus $21,563 for females. The per capita income for the township was $18,614. About 11.1% of families and 10.8% of the population were below the poverty line, including 12.5% of those under the age of eighteen and none of those 65 or over.
