= Hamre =

Hamre may refer to:

== Places ==
- Hamre Township, Beltrami County, Minnesota, a civil township in Minnesota, United States
- Hamre, Osterøy, a village in Osterøy municipality in Vestland county, Norway
- Hamre Municipality, a former municipality in Vestland county, Norway
- Hamre Church, a church in Osterøy municipality in Vestland county, Norway
- Hamre, Jammu and Kashmir, a village located in Pattan Tehsil of Baramulla district in India

== People ==
- Chad Hamre, CEO and co-founder of Ethical Ocean
- John Hamre (born 1950), think tank president and former U.S. government official
- Knut Hamre (born 1952), Norwegian Hardanger fiddle player
- Lasse Hamre (born 1944), Norwegian alpine skier
- Ole Hamre (born 1959), Norwegian musician (drums, percussion) and composer
- Philip Hamre (1897–1961), American politician
- Sverre B. Hamre (1918–1990), Norwegian general
- Tor Henning Hamre (born 1979), former Norwegian football striker
