= Minnesota's 66th Senate district =

American legislative district

Minnesota's 66th State Senate district
Senator
Clare Oumou Verbeten; DFL–Saint Paul
since January 2, 2023
- Demographics: 61.8%% White; 11.3% Black; 6.4% Hispanic; 16% Asian; 1% Native American; 1.8% Other; 3.4% Multiracial
- Population (2020): 68,036

The 66th district of the Minnesota Senate encompasses a small part of the western border of the county of Ramsey . It has formerly included Norman, Polk, Red Lake, and Pennington, counties. The district is currently served by Democratic-Farmer-Labor Senator Clare Oumou Verbeten.

== List of senators ==
Session	Image	Senator	Party	Term start	Term end	Home	Counties represented
39th		Richard Thompson Buckler	Nonpartisan Election-Liberal Caucus	January 4, 1915	January 5, 1919	Crookston	Polk
40th		Richard Thompson Buckler	Nonpartisan Election-Liberal Caucus	January 4, 1915	January 5, 1919	Crookston	Polk
41st		James Cumming	Nonpartisan Election	January 6, 1919	December 31, 1922	East Grand Forks	Polk
42nd		James Cumming	Nonpartisan Election	January 6, 1919	December 31, 1922	East Grand Forks	Polk
43rd		Richard Thompson Buckler	Nonpartisan Election-Liberal Caucus	January 1, 1923	January 2, 1927	Crookston	Polk
44th		Richard Thompson Buckler	Nonpartisan Election-Liberal Caucus	January 1, 1923	January 2, 1927	Crookston	Polk
45th		John H. Hougen	Nonpartisan Election	January 2, 1927	January 4, 1931	Crookston	Polk
46th		John H. Hougen	Nonpartisan Election	January 2, 1927	January 4, 1931	Crookston	Polk
47th		Richard Thompson Buckler	Nonpartisan Election-Liberal Caucus	January 5, 1931	January 5, 1935	Crookston	Polk
48th		Richard Thompson Buckler	Nonpartisan Election-Liberal Caucus	January 5, 1931	January 5, 1935	Crookston	Polk
49th		Alfred Solstad	Nonpartisan Election	6 January, 1935	5 January, 1947	Fisher	Polk
50th		Alfred Solstad	Nonpartisan Election	6 January, 1935	5 January, 1947	Fisher	Polk
51st		Alfred Solstad	Nonpartisan Election	6 January, 1935	5 January, 1947	Fisher	Polk
52nd		Alfred Solstad	Nonpartisan Election	6 January, 1935	5 January, 1947	Fisher	Polk
53rd		Alfred Solstad	Nonpartisan Election	6 January, 1935	5 January, 1947	Fisher	Polk
54th		Alfred Solstad	Nonpartisan Election	6 January, 1935	5 January, 1947	Fisher	Polk
55th		Julius Spokely	Nonpartisan Election	6 January, 1947	31 December, 1950	Crookston	Polk
56th		Julius Spokely	Nonpartisan Election	6 January, 1947	31 December, 1950	Crookston	Polk
57th		Louis Adrian Murray	Nonpartisan Election-Liberal Caucus	1 January, 1951	6 January, 1963	East Grand Forks	Polk
58th		Louis Adrian Murray	Nonpartisan Election-Liberal Caucus	1 January, 1951	6 January, 1963	East Grand Forks	Polk
59th		Louis Adrian Murray	Nonpartisan Election-Liberal Caucus	1 January, 1951	6 January, 1963	East Grand Forks	Polk
60th		Louis Adrian Murray	Nonpartisan Election-Liberal Caucus	1 January, 1951	6 January, 1963	East Grand Forks	Polk
61st		Louis Adrian Murray	Nonpartisan Election-Liberal Caucus	1 January, 1951	6 January, 1963	East Grand Forks	Polk
62nd		Louis Adrian Murray	Nonpartisan Election-Liberal Caucus	1 January, 1951	6 January, 1963	East Grand Forks	Polk
63rd		Harveydale Maruska	Nonpartisan Election - Conservative Caucus	7 January, 1963	1 January, 1967	Angus	Pennington, Polk and Red Lake
64th		Harveydale Maruska	Nonpartisan Election - Conservative Caucus	7 January, 1963	1 January, 1967	Angus	Pennington, Polk and Red Lake
65th		Norman J. Larson	Nonpartisan Election - Conservative Caucus	2 January, 1967	3 January, 1971	Ada	Norman, Polk and Red Lake
66th		Norman J. Larson	Nonpartisan Election - Conservative Caucus	2 January, 1967	3 January, 1971	Ada	Norman, Polk and Red Lake
67th		Roger Moe	Nonpartisan Election - Democratic-Farmer-Labor Caucus	4 January, 1971	31 December, 1972	Ada	Norman, Polk and Red Lake
68th		John Chenoweth	Nonpartisan Election - Democratic-Farmer-Labor Caucus	1 January, 1973	2 January, 1977	Saint Paul	Ramsey
69th		John Chenoweth	Nonpartisan Election - Democratic-Farmer-Labor Caucus	1 January, 1973	2 January, 1977	Saint Paul	Ramsey
70th		John Chenoweth	Democratic-Farmer-Labor	1 January, 1973	2 January, 1977	Saint Paul	Ramsey
71st		John Chenoweth	Democratic-Farmer-Labor	1 January, 1973	2 January, 1977	Saint Paul	Ramsey
71st	Vacant			26 November, 1979	4 January, 1981		Ramsey
72nd		Eugene T. Waldorf	Democratic-Farmer-Labor	5 January, 1981	1 January, 1883	Saint Paul	Ramsey
73rd		Eugene T. Waldorf	Democratic-Farmer-Labor	5 January, 1981	1 January, 1883	Saint Paul	Ramsey
74th		Eugene T. Waldorf	Democratic-Farmer-Labor	5 January, 1981	1 January, 1883	Saint Paul	Ramsey
75th		Eugene T. Waldorf	Democratic-Farmer-Labor	5 January, 1981	1 January, 1883	Saint Paul	Ramsey
76th		Eugene T. Waldorf	Democratic-Farmer-Labor	5 January, 1981	1 January, 1883	Saint Paul	Ramsey
77th		Eugene T. Waldorf	Democratic-Farmer-Labor	5 January, 1981	1 January, 1883	Saint Paul	Ramsey
78th		Ellen Anderson	Democratic-Farmer-Labor	4 January, 1993	20 March, 2011	Saint Paul	Ramsey
79th		Ellen Anderson	Democratic-Farmer-Labor	4 January, 1993	20 March, 2011	Saint Paul	Ramsey
80th		Ellen Anderson	Democratic-Farmer-Labor	4 January, 1993	20 March, 2011	Saint Paul	Ramsey
81st		Ellen Anderson	Democratic-Farmer-Labor	4 January, 1993	20 March, 2011	Saint Paul	Ramsey
82nd		Ellen Anderson	Democratic-Farmer-Labor	4 January, 1993	20 March, 2011	Saint Paul	Ramsey
83rd		Ellen Anderson	Democratic-Farmer-Labor	4 January, 1993	20 March, 2011	Saint Paul	Ramsey
84th		Ellen Anderson	Democratic-Farmer-Labor	4 January, 1993	20 March, 2011	Saint Paul	Ramsey
85th		Ellen Anderson	Democratic-Farmer-Labor	4 January, 1993	20 March, 2011	Saint Paul	Ramsey
86th		Ellen Anderson	Democratic-Farmer-Labor	4 January, 1993	20 March, 2011	Saint Paul	Ramsey
87th - Resigned		Ellen Anderson	Democratic-Farmer-Labor	4 January, 1993	20 March, 2011	Saint Paul	Ramsey
87th - Finished Term		Mary Jo McGuire	Democratic-Farmer-Labor	18 April, 2011	6 January, 2013	Falcon Heights	Ramsey
88th		John Marty	Democratic-Farmer-Labor	7 January, 2013	1 January, 2023	Roseville	Ramsey
89th		John Marty	Democratic-Farmer-Labor	7 January, 2013	1 January, 2023	Roseville	Ramsey
90th		John Marty	Democratic-Farmer-Labor	7 January, 2013	1 January, 2023	Roseville	Ramsey
91st		John Marty	Democratic-Farmer-Labor	7 January, 2013	1 January, 2023	Roseville	Ramsey
92nd		John Marty	Democratic-Farmer-Labor	7 January, 2013	1 January, 2023	Roseville	Ramsey
93rd		Clare Oumou Verbeten	Democratic-Farmer-Labor	2 January, 2023	Incumbent	Saint Paul	Ramsey
94th		Clare Oumou Verbeten	Democratic-Farmer-Labor	2 January, 2023	Incumbent	Saint Paul	Ramsey

== Recent elections ==
=== 2022 ===
The candidate filing deadline was May 31, 2022. The general election was held on November 8, 2022, resulting in Verbeten's victory.

2022 Minnesota Senate election
Party	Candidate	Votes	%
Democratic (DFL)	Clare Oumou Verbeten	23,987	78.4
Republican	Mikki Murray	5,522	18
Libertarian	Jeremy Peichel	1,061	3.5
Write-in	N/A	21	0.1
Total votes		30,593	100.0
Democratic (DFL) hold			

=== 2020 ===
The candidate filing deadline was June 6, 2020. The general election was held on November 3, 2020, resulting in Marty's victory.

2020 Minnesota Senate election
Party	Candidate	Votes	%
Democratic (DFL)	John Marty	31,880	76.9
Republican	Greg Copeland	9,490	22.9
Write-in	N/A	90	0.2
Total votes		41,450	100.0
Democratic (DFL) hold			

=== 2016 ===
The candidate filing deadline was May 31, 2016. The general election was held on November 8, 2016, resulting in Marty's victory.

Minnesota State Senate election, 2008
Party	Candidate	Votes	%
Democratic (DFL)	John Marty	28,312	74.5
Republican	Carolyn Jass	9,670	24.5
Total votes		37,982	100.0
Democratic (DFL) hold			

=== 2012 ===
Elections for the Minnesota State Senate occurred after state-wide redistricting from 2010. The signature-filing deadline for candidates wishing to run in this election was June 5, 2012. John Marty defeated Wayde Brooks in the general election.

Minnesota State Senate election, 2008
Party	Candidate	Votes	%
Democratic (DFL)	John Marty	27,735	74.1
Republican	Wayde Brooks	9,718	25.9
Total votes		37,453	100.0
hold			
