= Hanjiwera =

Hanjiwera HeanzYor
- Village
- Location in Jammu and Kashmir, India Hanjiwera (India)
- Coordinates: 34.1409717°N 74.5829327°E
- Country: India
- Union territory: Jammu and Kashmir
- District: Baramulla

Area
  - Total: 2 km^{2} (0.77 sq mi)
- Elevation: 1,553 m (5,095 ft)

Population (census 2011)
  - Total: 10,000

Languages
  - Official: Kashmiri, Urdu, Hindi, Dogri, English
- Time zone: UTC+5:30 (IST)
- PIN: 193121

Hanjiwera or HeanzYor is a notified area and village in Singhpora, Pattan, Baramulla district in Indian union territory of Jammu and Kashmir. It is located 31 km (19 mi) to the east from the district headquarters in Baramulla and 23 km (14 mi) from union territory capital, Srinagar.

Hanjiwera is divided into two sub-localities: Hanjiwera Bala and Hanjiwera Payeen. Hanjiwera Bala is predominantly inhabited by Sunni Muslims, with a Hindu minority. While Hanjiwera Payeen is predominantly inhabited by Shia Muslims. The village is located on either sides of NH-1A highway connecting Baramulla and Srinagar.

Baramula, Sopore, Bandipora, Srinagar are the nearby cities to Hanjiwera.

== Geography ==
Hanjiwera is located at 34.14°N 74.58°E. It has an average elevation of 1553 metres (5095 ft) above mean sea level. Hanjwera is surrounded by Baramulla Tehsil to the west, Rohama Tehsil to the north, Kralpora Tehsil to the south, Pattan Tehsil to the east. Sherabad, Singhpora, Pattan, Zangam and Kongamdara are nearby villages.

== Transport ==
=== Railways ===
Pattan railway station, Mazhom railway station are the very nearby railway stations to Hanjiwera.

=== Roadways ===
Hanjiwera is connected both with the Srinagar city and baramulla city by NH-1A on South and North sides respectively. It provides a link road to Gulmarg via Hanjiwera-Magam-Kunzer-Tangmarg-Gulmarg. Srinagar is about 24 km (15 mi) from the main town.
