= Grand Theater (Crookston, Minnesota) =

Movie theater and former opera house in Crookston, Minnesota

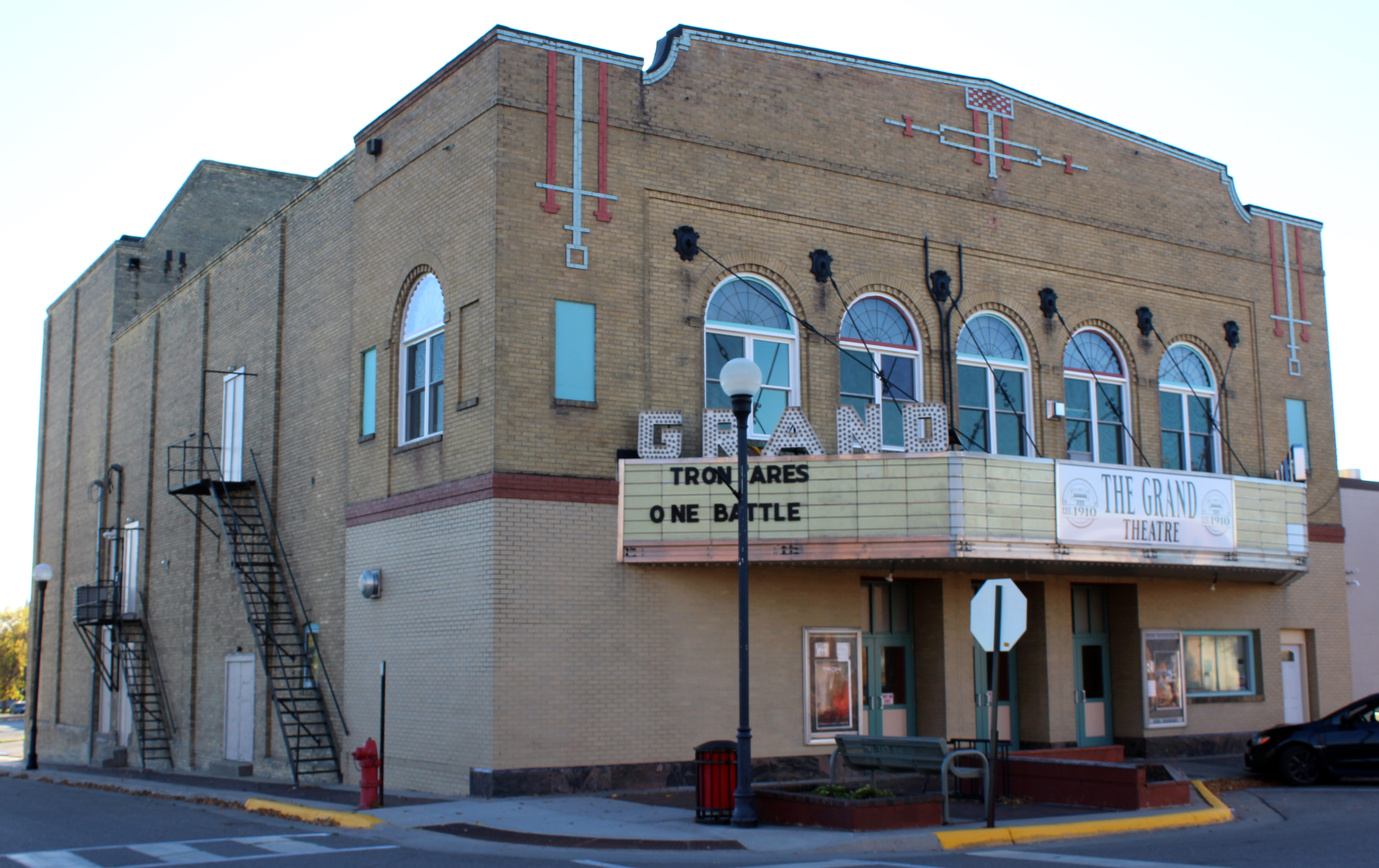
- The Grand Theater in Crookston
- Interactive map of Grand Theater
- Address: 124 East Second Street; Crookston, Minnesota; United States
- Coordinates: 47.7741°N 96.6052°W
- Operator: Moore Family Theatres
- Type: Movie theater and former opera house

Construction
- Opened: 1910

The Grand Theater is a two-screen movie theater and former opera house at 124 East Second Street in Crookston, Minnesota, United States. Opened in 1910, it initially presented stage productions, vaudeville, touring shows, short films, and other entertainment before motion pictures became its principal offering in 1917. Generations of the Hiller family operated the theater for nearly 90 years.

The building was repeatedly altered to accommodate changes in film exhibition and audience expectations. It was equipped for sound in 1932, a concession stand was added in 1949, a modern marquee was in place by 1954, and a second auditorium was added in 1984.

== History ==
Members of the Crookston Commercial Club initiated construction of the Grand after petitions appeared in the local newspaper calling for a new performance venue. The project was intended to bring both cultural activity and additional business to the growing community. Although other theaters operated in Crookston at the time, the Grand was the city's only opera house equipped to accommodate larger live productions and was described as one of the finest theaters in northwestern Minnesota.

The theater advertised regularly in the Crookston Daily Times beginning in 1910. Its early programming included vaudeville, traveling companies, comedies, stage productions, and short films, sometimes accompanied by a house orchestra. Crookston was a stop on the theatrical touring route between the Minneapolis–Saint Paul area and Winnipeg, allowing the Grand to present productions that also attracted audiences from surrounding communities.

During the 1910s, the theater's Sunday-night vaudeville performances became a regular attraction. Motion pictures became the Grand's principal offering in 1917, with programs that included feature films, serials, newsreels, cartoons, and short subjects. The theater also held discounted children's shows, Christmas matinees featuring a live Santa Claus, and promotional giveaways during the Great Depression. Members of the Hiller family participated in its operation in roles ranging from musicians and concession workers to ticket sellers.

The theater adapted as motion-picture technology changed. It was equipped for sound in 1932. In 1949, a storefront on the left side of the entrance was removed and replaced by a concession stand, and by 1954 a streamlined modern marquee had been installed. A second screen was constructed alongside the original building in 1984. A major lobby renovation followed in 2005, adding a new concession area and altering the interior entrance arrangement.

A 2022 visitors guide published by the Crookston Convention and Visitors Bureau identified the Grand as one of the prominent buildings in the city's historic downtown. It noted that the building had housed a candy store and a business college and that its original orchestra pit remained visible. The theater continues to operate as a two-screen cinema under Moore Family Theatres.

== Architecture and alterations ==
The original building had a simple Classical exterior faced in brick, with most of its ornament concentrated on the front facade. Five second-story windows were centered above three entrance doors. A large storefront window stood on one side of the entrances, with display windows on the other. Raised brickwork decorated the cornice, and a simple marquee projected above the entrance.

The original auditorium was more elaborate than the exterior. Its stage was framed by an ornamental plaster proscenium, while the walls were painted and stenciled. Small stained-glass exit signs were installed throughout the building. A horseshoe-shaped balcony extended toward box seats on either side of the stage.

A modernization during the 1930s introduced Art Deco light fixtures and seating, some of which remained in the building in 2010. These elements were later combined with the streamlined marquee and concession stand installed around the 1950s. Other exterior changes included the removal of the original storefront, the boarding of some second-story windows, and the addition of a mural to the rear wall.

By 2010, the balcony and box seats had been removed and replaced by stadium seating. The movie screen concealed the original backstage rigging and fly loft, although the stage structure and its equipment remained in place. Helgerson reported that the building's original electrical system remained in use and that portions of its original mechanical equipment remained in the basement.
