= Theodore W. Thorson =

American politician (1922–2018)

Theodore Winton Thorson (July 17, 1922 – October 29, 2018) was an American politician and educator.

Thorson was born in Crookston, Minnesota and graduated from Crookston High School in 1940. He served in the United States Marine Corps during World War II and was a pilot. Thorson graduated from the University of North Dakota in 1948. He received his master's degree from the University of Minnesota in instrumental music education in 1950 and his doctorate degree in music education from Northwestern University. In 1966, Thorson, his wife, and family moved to Bemidji, Minnesota. Thorson was the Bemidji State University band director until he retired in 1984. Thorson served on the Bemidji School Board and was a Republican. He also served in the Minnesota House of Representatives in 1985 and 1986. Thorson died at Neilsen Place in Bemidji, Minnesota.
