= Wanigam Bala =

Wanigam Bala Weayngam Bala
- Village
- Location within Jammu and Kashmir
- Coordinates: 34.16667404835274°N 74.50231431915878°E
- Country: India
- Union Territory: Jammu and Kashmir
- District: Baramulla
- Tehsil: Pattan

Area (In hectares)
  - Total: 204.4 km^{2} (78.9 sq mi)
- Elevation: 1,578 m (5,177 ft)

Population
  - Total: 1,538
- Time zone: UTC+5:30 (IST)
  - Summer (DST): IST
- Area code: 002315

Wanigam Bala is a village in Baramulla district in the union territory of Jammu and Kashmir, India. It is 8 km (5.0 mi) away from Pattan, the tehsil capital.

== Demographics ==
According to the 2011 Census of India around 1,538 people live in the village with 780 people male and 758 people female. The literacy rate in the village is 52.86% where around 57.56% of the male are literate and 48.02% of the females are literate. There are around 212 houses in the village.
