= Goshbugh =

Goshbugh Goushbugh
- Village
- Country: India
- Union territory: Jammu and Kashmir
- District: Baramulla
- Tehsil: Pattan

Population
  - Total: 3,441
- Postal code: 193121

Goshbugh (also spelled Goushbugh) is a village in the Pattan tehsil of Baramulla district, in the Union territory of Jammu and Kashmir, India. The village has the postal code 193121 and is located in the Pattan area of Baramulla district. Goshbugh is located in the Kashmir Valley in northern Jammu and Kashmir. It lies in the Pattan area of Baramulla district and is connected by road with Pattan and surrounding settlements. Goshbugh is administered within the Pattan tehsil and Pattan development block of Baramulla district.
