= Harvey A. Wilder =

American farmer and politician (1907–1968)

Harvey A. Wilder (February 17, 1907 – March 15, 1968) was an American farmer and politician.

Wilder was born in Minnesota on February 17, 1907, and graduated from Crookston High School in Crookston, Minnesota. He also attended Northwestern Agricultural College (now University of Minnesota Crookston) in Crookston. Wilder lived in Crookston with his wife and family, and was a farmer. He served in the Minnesota National Guard during World War II and the Korean War. Wilder served on the Crookston City Council and also served in the Minnesota House of Representatives from 1957 to 1966. He died in Polk County, Minnesota on March 15, 1968.
