= Agassiz Recreational Trail =

Rail trail in Minnesota, U.S.

Coordinates: 47°24′44″N 96°16′14″W

- Length: 53 mi (85 km)
- Location: Clay, Norman, and Polk counties, Minnesota, United States
- Trailheads: Ulen; Crookston
- Use: Hiking, bicycling, equestrian, cross-country skiing, snowmobiling, and ATV riding
- Difficulty: Easiest
- Months: April 1 to November 30
- Hazards: River crossings
- Website: http://www.agassiztrail.org

Agassiz Recreational Trail is a 53-mile (85 km), multi-use rail trail in northwest Minnesota, United States, between the towns of Crookston and Ulen. Hiking, bicycling, horseback riding, cross-country skiing, snowmobiling and ATV riding are allowed on the natural-surface trail. The trail is owned by Clay, Norman and Polk counties. Representatives from each county serving on a joint powers board operate the trail. The trail should not be confused with the Agassiz Interpretive Trail in Manitoba, Canada.

== Route ==
Agassiz Recreational Trail was converted from an abandoned rail bed running parallel to state highways 32 and 102. The route traverses sparsely wooded rural farmland. There are a number of rivers and creek crossings along the route, including the Sand Hill, Wild Rice and South Branch Wild Rice Rivers, and Mashaug Creek.

The trail passes through several towns (in order from south to north):

- Ulen (southern terminus)
- Twin Valley
- Gary
- Fertile
- Crookston (northern terminus)

== See also ==
- Multi-use trail
