= Ulen, Minnesota =

City in Minnesota, United States

Ulen
- City
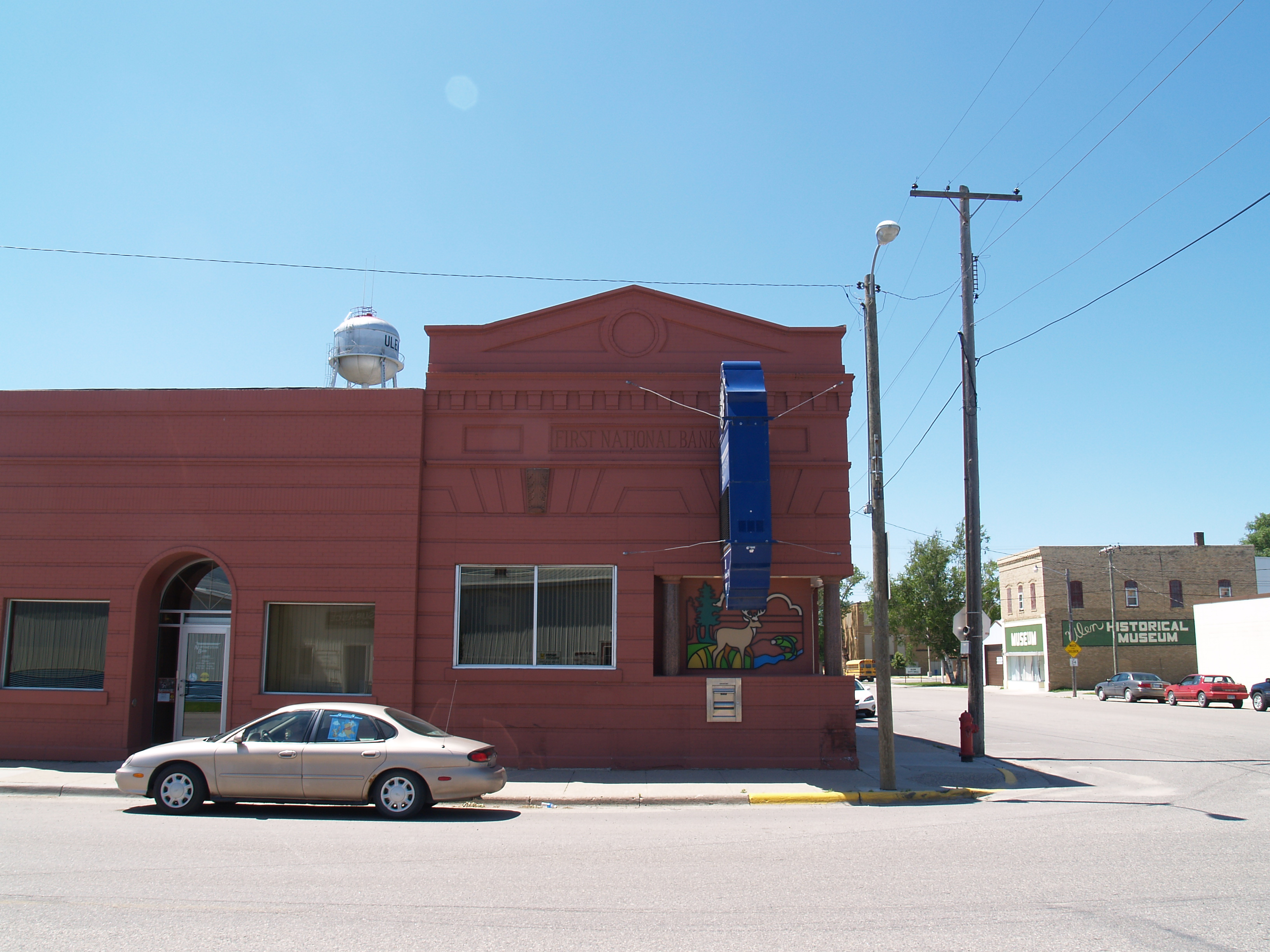
- Commercial district

- Location of Ulen, Minnesota

- Location within Minnesota Location within the United States
- Coordinates: 47°04′42″N 96°15′29″W
- Country: United States
- State: Minnesota
- County: Clay

Government
  - Type: Mayor-Council
  - Mayor: Mary A. Knopfler

Area
  - Total: 1.07 sq mi (2.77 km^{2})
  - Land: 1.07 sq mi (2.77 km^{2})
  - Water: 0 sq mi (0.00 km^{2})
- Elevation: 1,148 ft (350 m)

Population (2020)
  - Total: 476
  - Estimate (2021): 484
  - Density: 445.0/sq mi (171.83/km^{2})
- Time zone: UTC-6 (CST)
  - Summer (DST): UTC-5 (CDT)
- ZIP code: 56585
- Area code: 218
- FIPS code: 27-66136
- GNIS feature ID: 2397080

Ulen (/ˈjuːlən/ YOO-lən) is a city in Clay County, Minnesota, United States, along the South Branch of the Wild Rice River. The population was 476 at the 2020 census.

Near this small community, what may be an authentic Viking sword known as the Ulen sword was found in a field by Hans O. Hansen in 1911. The sword is currently on display in the Ulen Museum. Ulen and the area surrounding is mostly inhabited by later generation Norwegian-Americans.

Ulen is the southern terminus of the Agassiz Recreational Trail, a 53-mile multi-use trail built on an abandoned railroad grade which has its northern terminus at Crookston, Minnesota.

== History ==
Ulen Township was named after an early European to settle in the region, Ole Ulen. Ulen was incorporated as a village on November 12, 1896. A meeting was held on June 7, 1881, at the home of Nels Wiger for the purpose of organizing Ulen Township. Robert Hanson, Elias Rost and Ole Mellum were the election judges and Nels Wiger served as the clerk. One of the concerns of the early township officials was the building of roads. There were no tax funds for this purpose so each able-bodied man was required to work for two days a year building roads. The first road was laid out and built in 1883.

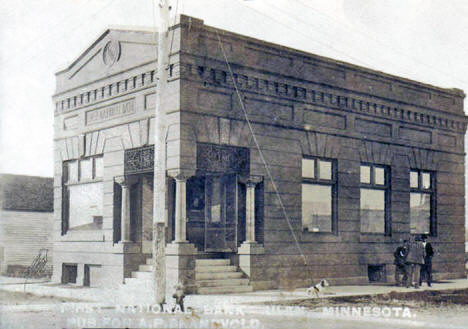
First National Bank, 1910s

The post office was established in 1884, its name changing to Odneland in 1885 for Ole Odneland (Tallak Aaneland), postmaster and general store owner, although it was sometimes spelled Oneland and Onland. When the railroad came in 1886, Odneland's (Aaneland's) store was in the path of the rails, so it was moved to the east side of the tracks on the northwest corner of Regelstad's farm. In 1886, the same year Ulen was incorporated, the Duluth and Manitoba Railway company, a subsidiary of the Northern Pacific Railway, built the railroad between what is now known as Manitoba Junction and Red Lake Falls, taking the railroad directly through Ulen. Ole Asleson platted a townsite, and the name was changed to Ulen with Odneland remaining as postmaster until the post office was reorganized in 1887 and Ole Christian Melbye became postmaster in his grocery store; Melbye moved into the first house built in village limits in 1887. Ulen came to be mostly inhabited by Norwegian immigrants and the town continues to hold on to its Nordic identity.

The Ulen Historical Society was founded in September 1963. In 2004 a new Ulen Historical Society was organized.

The Ulen Historical Society runs the Ulen Museum, home to the Ulen Sword. The Ulen Sword is 19th century sword, once believed to be a Viking sword, which the town takes great pride in. The sword was found by Hans O. Hansen on his farm while plowing in 1911. The former name of the Ulen Museum was the Viking Sword Museum.

The town has been able to grow slowly over the years in part thanks to Northwestern Bank. In 1941, the bank moved to Ulen and changed its name to Northwestern Bank. One of the historic events of the bank occurred in 1958 when the bank reached 1 million dollar figure in deposits. This first branch in Ulen is still economically important. Over the years it has been slowly able to grow and expand. Eventually starting branches in Moorhead and other rural communities in northwestern Minnesota. Their branch in Ulen however has still been able to thrive and is an important business in the local economy and community, providing crucial service.

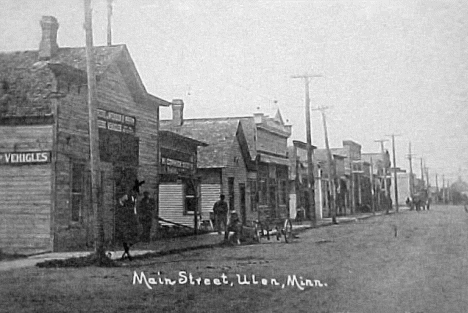
Main Street, 1910s

In 2005 Ulen needed to get the arsenic out of its water. Wells supplying the city's water had high concentrations of the chemical-more than twice the treatment standard of less than 10 parts per billion. Also the city was experiencing too many water main breaks, and its aging infrastructure needed replacing. As a result, Moore Engineering planned and designed a gravity filter system to remove arsenic from the water supply and made plans to replace aging water mains. The city's new water treatment plant removed arsenic to a level of less than 5 parts per billion, 50 percent more treatment than required. Grants and loans, including a $600,000 grant from the Small Cities Community Development program, helped pay for the improvements, ensuring water safety.

Historically known as an agricultural community, Ulen continues to flourish with the growth of agricultural and small family-owned businesses. West Central Ag Service operates the grain elevator in Ulen

== Geography ==
Ulen is a small agricultural town on the prairie of western Minnesota in Clay County, located about 40 miles east of Fargo, North Dakota. According to the United States Census Bureau, the city has a total area of 1.07 square miles (2.77 km^{2}), all land. State Highway 32 serves as a major arterial in the community. Ulen's zip code is 56585. Ulen is the southern terminus of the Agassiz Recreational Trail, a 53-mile multi-use trail built on an abandoned railroad grade which has its northern terminus at Crookston, Minnesota.

== Demographics ==
Since 1900, the population has never fallen below 300 or risen above 600, reaching a peak of 590 in the 1920s. Today about 480 people reside in Ulen, making it one of over 12,000 incorporated places in the United States with fewer than 2,500 citizens, the population below which the US Census Bureau defines an area to be rural. As of 2022 the town of Ulen has the 8th highest amount of Norwegian Americans, relative to its total population, in the state of Minnesota.

Historical population
Census	Pop.	Note	%±
1900	317		—
1910	438		38.2%
1920	590		34.7%
1930	452		−23.4%
1940	562		24.3%
1950	525		−6.6%
1960	481		−8.4%
1970	486		1.0%
1980	514		5.8%
1990	547		6.4%
2000	532		−2.7%
2010	547		2.8%
2020	476		−13.0%
2021 (est.)	484		1.7%
U.S. Decennial Census; 2020 Census

=== 2020 census ===
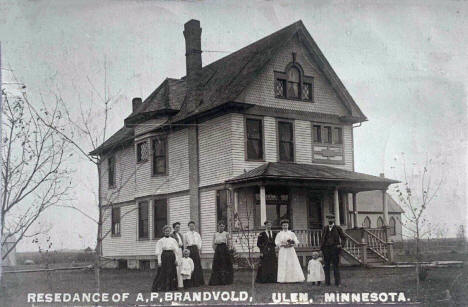
Residence of AP Brandvold, 1906

As of the census of 2020, there were 476 people, 204 households, and 99 families living in the city. The population density was 444.8 inhabitants per square mile (171.7/km^{2}). There were 241 housing units at an average density of 225.2 units per square mile (87.0 units/km^{2}). The racial makeup of the city was 90.9% White, 3.5% Native American, 0.6% from other races, and 4.8% from two or more races. Hispanic or Latino of any race were 0.6% of the population. A majority of Ulen has Norwegian ancestry.

There were 204 households, of which 17% had children under the age of 18 living with them, 31.9% were married couples living together, 9.3% had a female householder with no husband present, 7.4% had a male householder with no wife present, and 51.5% were non-families. 48.5% of all households were made up of individuals, and 30.4% had someone living alone who was 65 years of age or older. The average household size was 1.84 and the average family size was 2.66.

The median age in the city was 63.4 years. 17% of residents were under the age of 18; 1% were between the ages of 18 and 24; 13.6% were from 25 to 44; 21.6% were from 45 to 64; and 47% were 65 years of age or older. The gender makeup of the city was 42.3% male and 47.7% female.

=== 2010 census ===
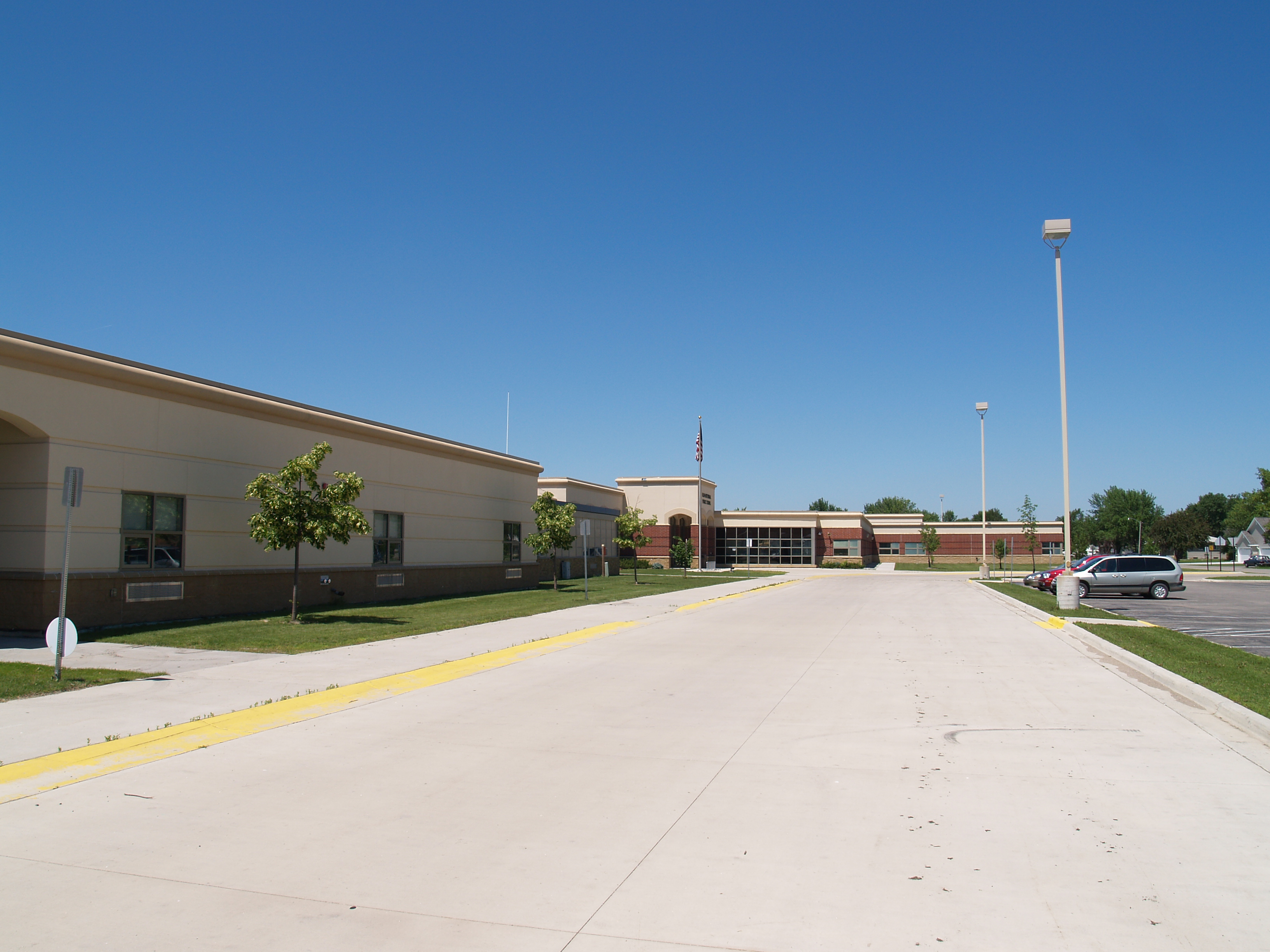
Public School, 2010s

As of the census of 2010, there were 547 people, 234 households, and 130 families living in the city. The population density was 479.8 inhabitants per square mile (185.3/km^{2}). There were 268 housing units at an average density of 235.1 units per square mile (90.8 units/km^{2}). The racial makeup of the city was 93.1% White, 0.4% African American, 3.7% Native American, 0.2% Asian, 0.5% from other races, and 2.2% from two or more races. Hispanic or Latino of any race were 0.5% of the population. A majority of Ulen has Norwegian ancestry.

There were 234 households, of which 26.9% had children under the age of 18 living with them, 43.2% were married couples living together, 8.1% had a female householder with no husband present, 4.3% had a male householder with no wife present, and 44.4% were non-families. 39.7% of all households were made up of individuals, and 21.8% had someone living alone who was 65 years of age or older. The average household size was 2.16 and the average family size was 2.89.

The median age in the city was 46.6 years. 21.2% of residents were under the age of 18; 5.3% were between the ages of 18 and 24; 21.5% were from 25 to 44; 23.9% were from 45 to 64; and 28% were 65 years of age or older. The gender makeup of the city was 49.4% male and 50.6% female.

=== 2000 census ===
As of the census of 2000, there were 532 people, 203 households, and 120 families living in the city. The population density was 488.9 inhabitants per square mile (188.8/km^{2}). There were 228 housing units at an average density of 209.5 units per square mile (80.9 units/km^{2}). The racial makeup of the city was 99.25% White and 0.75% Native American. Hispanic or Latino of any race were 0.19% of the population. A majority of Ulen has Norwegian ancestry.

There were 203 households, out of which 28.6% had children under the age of 18 living with them, 44.3% were married couples living together, 9.9% had a female householder with no husband present, and 40.4% were non-families. 35.5% of all households were made up of individuals, and 26.1% had someone living alone who was 65 years of age or older. The average household size was 2.24 and the average family size was 2.88.

In the city, the population was spread out, with 23.3% under the age of 18, 5.8% from 18 to 24, 19.9% from 25 to 44, 16.9% from 45 to 64, and 34.0% who were 65 years of age or older. The median age was 46 years. For every 100 females, there were 88.7 males. For every 100 females age 18 and over, there were 78.2 males.

The median income for a household in the city was $27,813, and the median income for a family was $42,188. Males had a median income of $33,036 versus $20,000 for females. The per capita income for the city was $16,593. About 5.0% of families and 8.5% of the population were below the poverty line, including 8.3% of those under age 18 and 15.6% of those age 65 or over.

== Government ==
Ulen has a mayor–council form of government. Ulen's current mayor is Mary A. Knopfler, who was elected in 2018, and reelected in 2022.

The representative body of the city of Ulen is the city council. The council members include James Ashmore, Jeremy Bagg, Randy Zimmerman, and Kim Syverson. Sandy Braseth is the appointed clerk/treasurer.

At the State Legislature level, Ulen's Representative is Debra L. Kiel with them being in the District 1B. Ulen used to be in District 4B until after the 2020 redistricting cycle. Ulen's State Senator is Mark Johnson with them being in District 1. Ulen used to be in District 4 until after the 2020 redistricting cycle. Both are Republicans. At the Federal Level Amy Klobuchar and Tina Smith are Minnesota Senators with them being Democrats. Michelle Fischbach represents Ulen in the U.S. House being from Minnesota's 7th District and a Republican.

== Economy ==
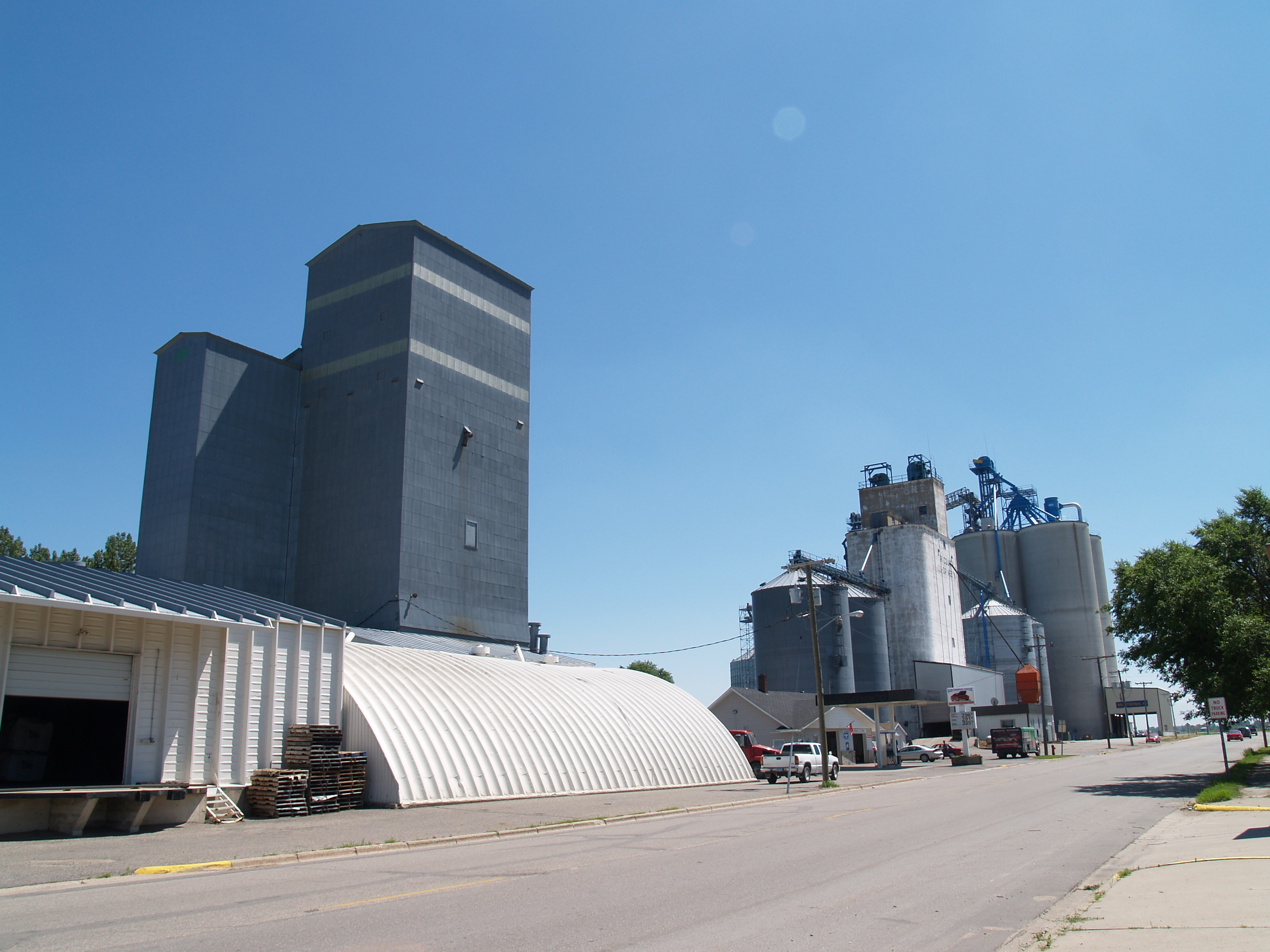
The Ulen Elevator

Ulen has an economy primarily made up of agriculture services and farms. The grain elevator in Ulen is run by West Central Ag Service, and is one of the largest in the state of Minnesota, and has currently more than 190 workers. This greatly benefits Ulen and the surrounding area, causing Ulen to be the agricultural hub of the surrounding towns. The West Central Ag Service business offices and service shop are both located in Ulen. The Nordic Lounge, Viking Manor, Sanford Health Clinic, Northwestern Bank, Ulen Building and Supply, and the West Central Ag Service Ulen Convince Store, are important businesses in the community.

=== Utilities ===
The Otter Tail Power Company provides electricity to the town with telephone and cable TV being provided by Arvig.

=== ‘Ulen’ Wheat ===
in 2006 a paper was published to the USDA to classify the wheat planted around Ulen as 'Ulen' Wheat this is due to Ulen being in its region of adaptation.

== Education ==
The Ulen-Hitterdal Public School is a school in Independent School District #914. It serves the community of Ulen and the neighboring town of Hitterdal. It is a K-12 institution with modern facilities. The school has a number of sports teams. The school mascot is the Titans with the school colors being black, blue, and gold.

Ulen has one library, the Ulen LINK Site. It is a LINK site of the Lake Agassiz Regional Library.

== Culture ==
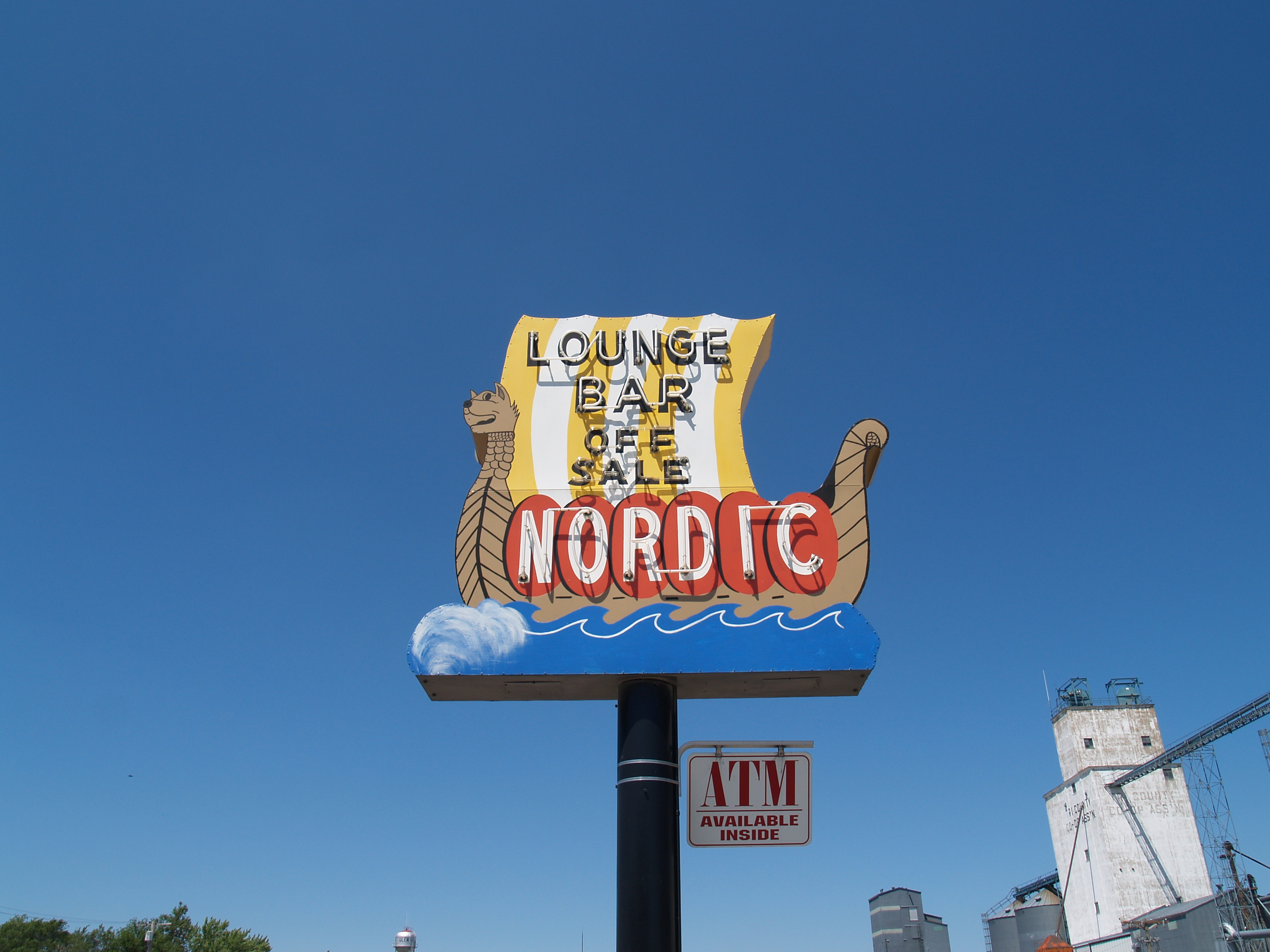
The sign of the Nordic Lounge

Ulen has a very large Norwegian American population. The Ulen museum, formerly the Viking Sword Museum, Viking Manor, numerous Norse and Viking artifacts found in the area further show to represent the deep pride the town has for its Norwegian heritage. Another manifestation of this pride is, Lena's Lefse, a bakery dedicated to lefse and other Norse baked items.

=== Memorial ===
Located in the center of Ulen on Main street is the Ulen's Veteran's Memorial Wall commemorating Ulen residents who have fought and died in American Wars. The memorial was a joint project by the VFW and the Ulen Lions.

=== Museum ===
The Ulen Museum (formerly the Viking Sword Museum) opened on Sunday, August 4, 2007. The Ulen Museum is located on Ulen's main street (State Highway 32). It is situated on the corner of Spartan Avenue and 1st St. NW. It is run by the Ulen Historical Society and is dedicated to preserving the rich history of Ulen. The Ulen Museum is home to the Ulen Sword. The Ulen Sword is 19th century sword, once believed to be a Viking sword. The sword was found by Hans O. Hansen on his farm while plowing in 1911.The former name of the Ulen Museum was the Viking Sword Museum.

=== Festival ===
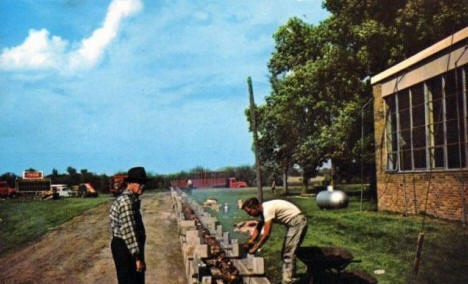
260-foot Turkey Barbecue Spit at Sword Days, 1969

Ulen Days (formerly Ulen Turkey Barbecue Days) is an annual event held on the third weekend in August each year and dates back to 1962. The Turkey BBQ includes a wide variety of events held during mid August. The most popular aspect of the festival is the turkey, which regularly is barbecued on Saturday from 3:30 – 6:00pm on “the world’s largest spit.” It includes an entire weekend of activities including shows, sport games and tournaments, raffles, and food trucks.

=== Theatre ===
The Top Hat Theatre serves as theater group in Ulen. It was created in 2005. Performances are in the Barry J. Houglum Auditorium, a 350-seat theater located in the Ulen-Hitterdal Public School.

== Organizations ==
Ulen throughout its history has had many organizations. Organizations such as the V.F.W, American Legion, bands, orchestras, and many more. While over the years many of them no longer exist they were vital to the establishing of modern-day Ulen.

=== V.F.W. Post 5115 ===
The VFW post was organized on December 2, 1945. It was named after Sander Jacobson who lost his life in active duty during World War II. The VFWs first meeting was held in Forsythe's Hall with 65 charting members. An old potato house was rented for the first meeting place in 1946 and continued to be the meeting place until the potato harvest forced the organization to find a new location. The meetings were then moved to any available place until an old store, known as the Brandvold Store, was bought in 1948. This building was used until 1961. when it was torn down and the present building was built. In 1974 a new 40 by 80-foot addition was built. Over the past years the VFW has sponsored and helped many organizations such as school scholarships, Voice of Democracy, baseball teams, softball teams, skating rink, cemetery funds, military funerals, Memorial Day programs, cancer research, Camp Courage, Fire Department, National home, wheel chairs and crutches for the homes and needy people and many more charities.

=== Ulen Lions Organization ===
The International Association of Lions Clubs granted a charter to the Ulen Lions on December 7, 1972. Over the years the Ulen Lions have had many large fundraisers. They often raise money for the community through things such as birthday calendars, bingo and raffles. The Lions use this money to provide scholarships to graduating students from the Ulen-Hitterdal Highschool, providing eyeglasses for needy in the community and the school. The Lions sponsored and paid for the press box for the highschool football field, made improvements to the softball field and grandstand, at a time offered snowmobile safety classes, provide annual clean-up at the Ulen Park, make donations to the school athletic banquet, Ulen Rescue Squad, Ulen Fire Department, Viking Manor Nursing Home, Ulen Community Choir, video equipment at the school, street signs and they have built a float that represents Ulen's Centennial celebration that used to participate in nearby and local parades.

On the international level, the Ulen Lions, give annually to the LCIF, Leader Dog Fund, Eye Bank, the Hearing Foundation and charter gifts for new clubs. Many of the currents Lions members are active in attending zone meetings and the mid-winter conventions. The Ulen Lions have been sponsoring the Lions Clubs of Hitterdal and Flom as well.

=== Other organizations ===
At a time Ulen hosted clubs such as the Sand Ridge Saddle Club, the Ulen Gun Club, Ulen Good Neighbors Club, the Ulen Commercial Club and the Ulen Study Club. Ulen continues to host organizations such as the Ulen Parent Teacher Organization, Ulen Historical Association, and Ulen 4-H Clubs. The town as a whole engages in much civic participation and take particular pride in their Historical Association and 4-H Clubs.

== Healthcare ==
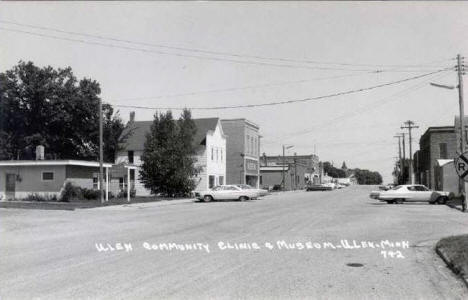
Ulen Community Clinic and Museum, 1960s

Sanford Health Ulen Clinic is a Sanford Health Clinic. It provides family medicine, radiology, and has laboratories as well as providing immunizations and mammograms.

Ulen is a large provider for healthcare for senior citizens in the area. The Ulen Senior Citizens Center acts as a communal gathering place for senior citizens in Ulen. The Viking Manor Nursing Home is another healthcare facility in Ulen for its seniors. It is a long-term care facility and nursing home. Viking Manor includes 45 beds for seniors.

== In popular culture ==
A 2013 episode of America Unearthed partly focuses on the ancient bones and Ulen Sword found in the area. The episode also includes many references to the town's Norwegian identity and possible Viking exploration in the area.

== Gallery ==
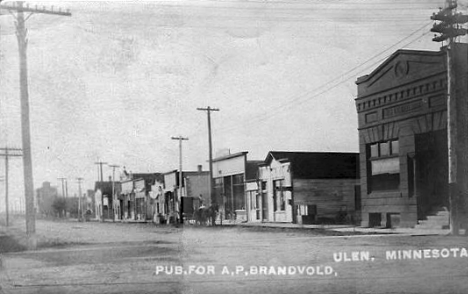
Street scene, 1913

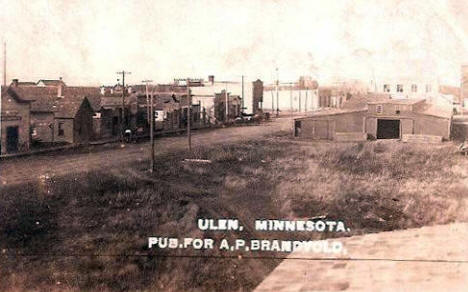
Street scene, 1911

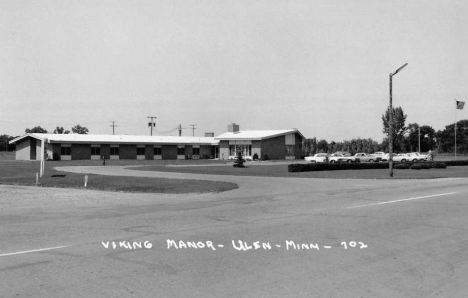
Viking Manor, 1950s

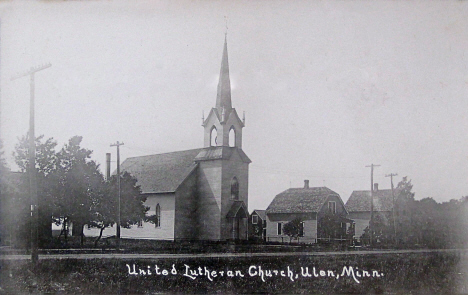
United Lutheran Church, 1910s

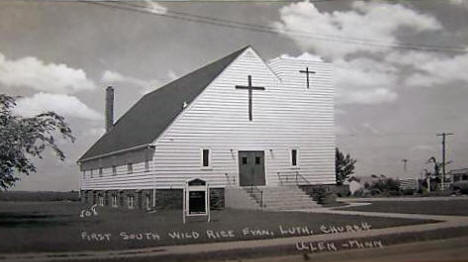
First South Wild Rice Evangelical Lutheran Church, 1950s

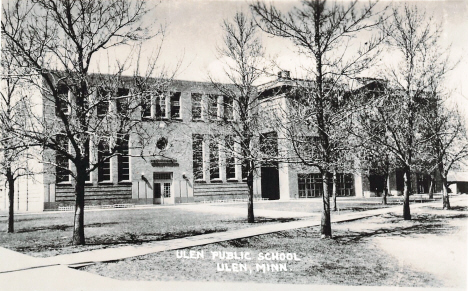
Public School, Ulen Minnesota, 1940s

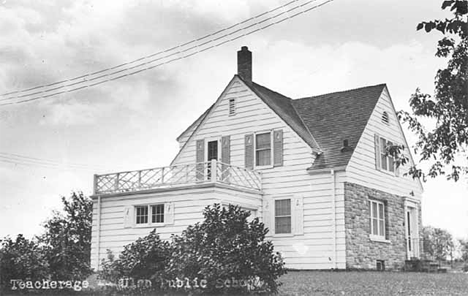
Teacherage, Ulen Public School, 1942

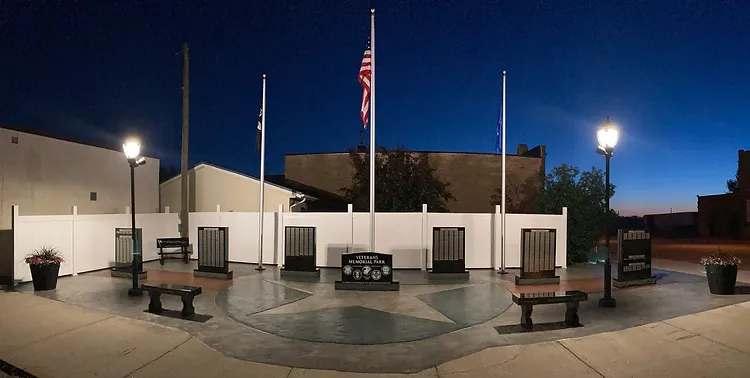
Ulen Veterans Memorial

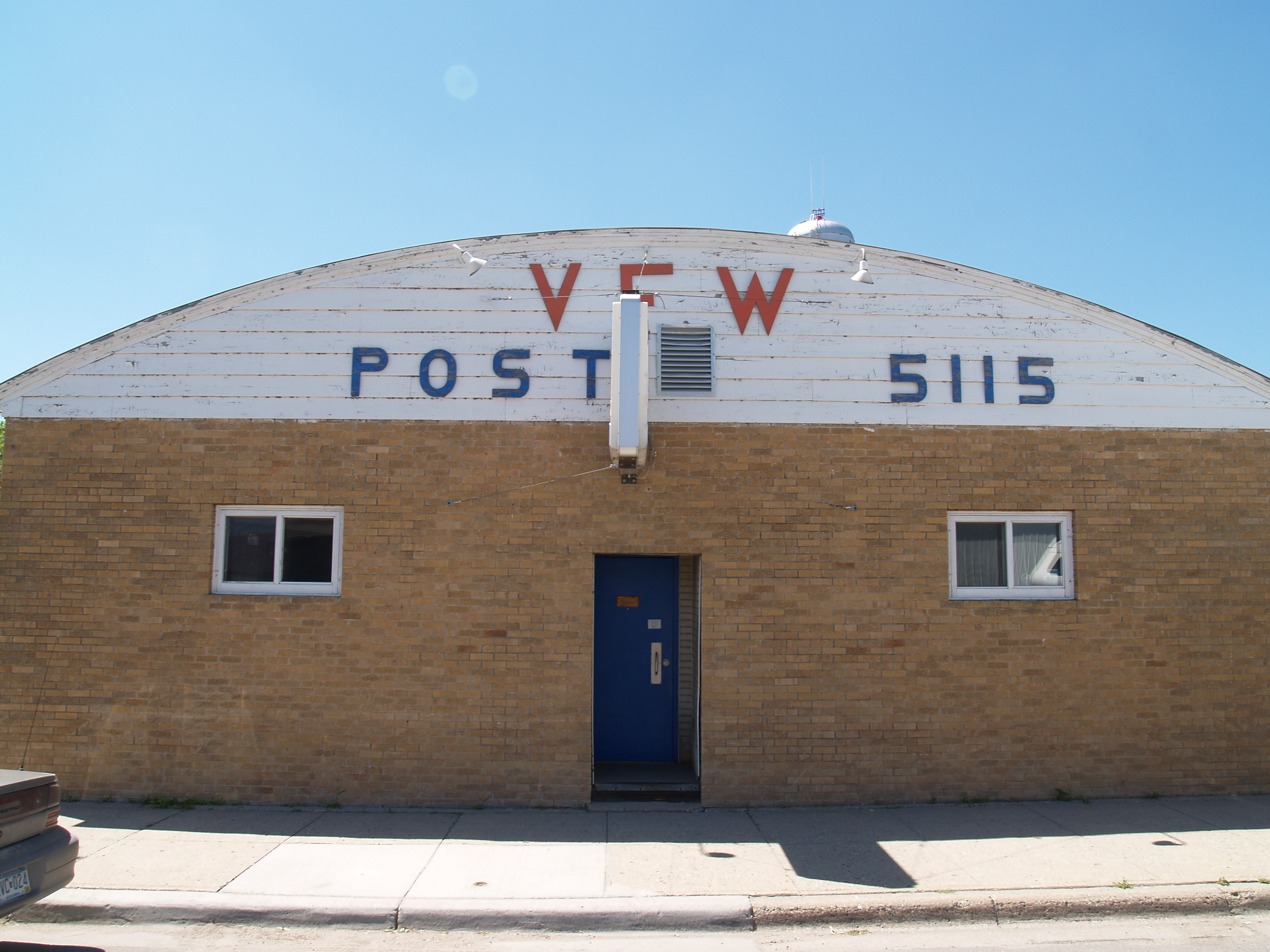
Ulen VFW Post

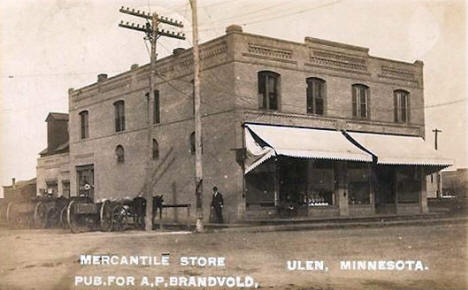
Mercantile Store, 1913

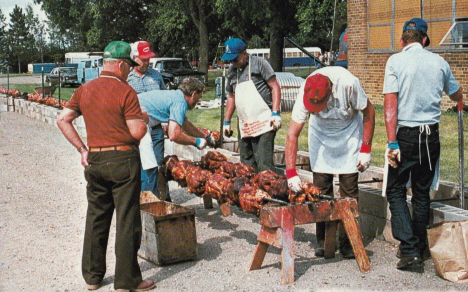
Annual "Turkey Barbecue Days", 1980s

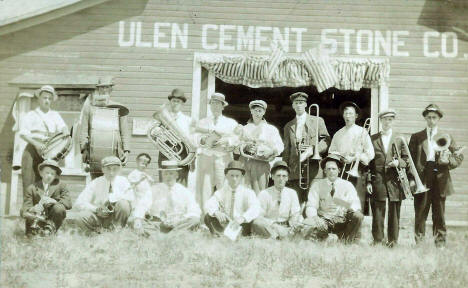
Band in front of Ulen Cement Company, 1910s

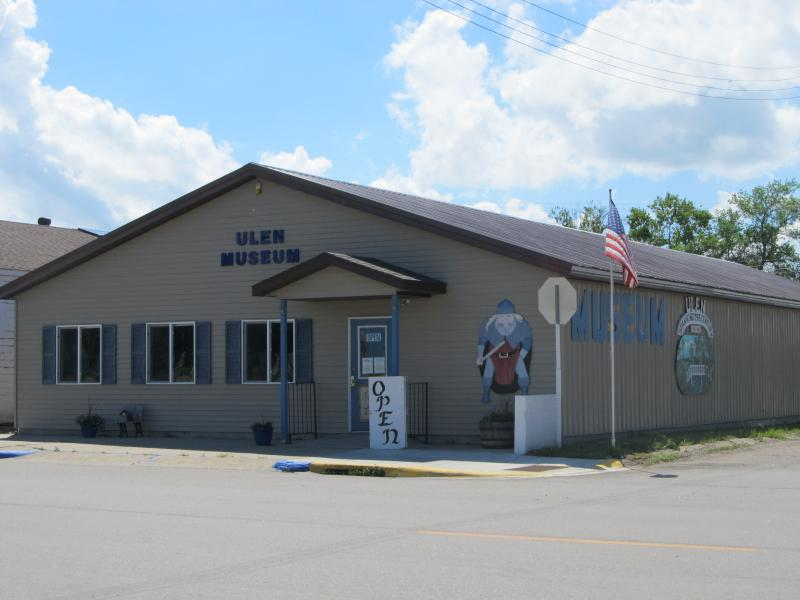
Ulen Museum
