= Gary, Minnesota =

City in Minnesota, United States

Gary
- City
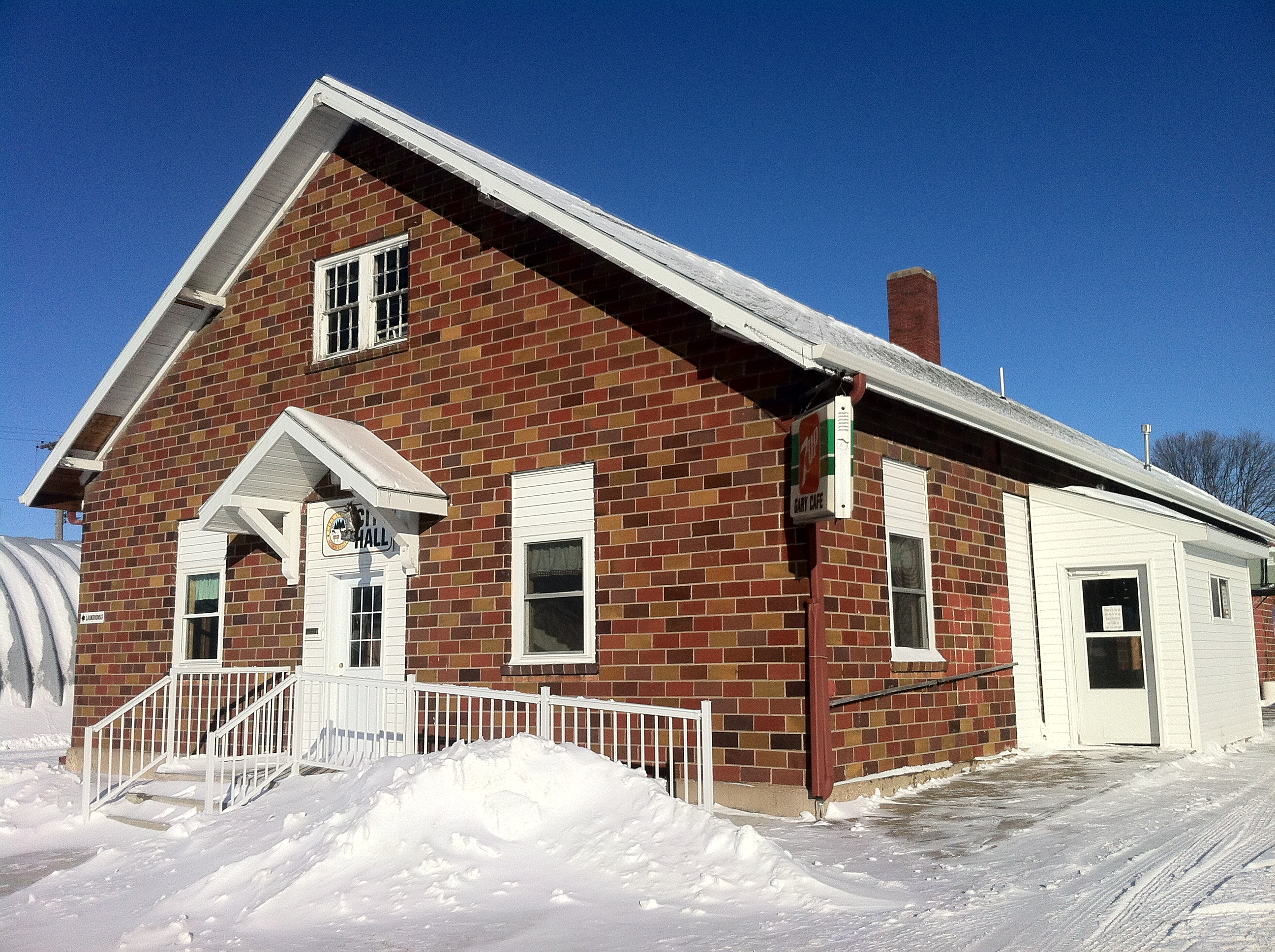
- City Hall

- Location of Gary, Minnesota
- Coordinates: 47°22′18″N 96°15′58″W
- Country: United States
- State: Minnesota
- County: Norman

Area
  - Total: 0.32 sq mi (0.83 km^{2})
  - Land: 0.32 sq mi (0.83 km^{2})
  - Water: 0 sq mi (0.00 km^{2})
- Elevation: 1,099 ft (335 m)

Population (2020)
  - Total: 227
  - Estimate (2021): 225
  - Density: 705.5/sq mi (272.39/km^{2})
- Time zone: UTC-6 (CST)
  - Summer (DST): UTC-5 (CDT)
- ZIP code: 56545
- Area code: 218
- FIPS code: 27-23246
- GNIS feature ID: 0644055
- Website: https://www.garymn.com/

Gary is a city in Norman County, Minnesota, United States. The population was 227 at the 2020 census.

== History ==
Gary was laid out in 1883, and named for Garrett L. Thorpe, a pioneer merchant. A post office has been in operation at Gary since 1887.

== Geography ==
According to the United States Census Bureau, the city has a total area of 0.33 square miles (0.85 km^{2}), all land.

The Agassiz Recreational Trail, a 53-mile multi-use trail built on an abandoned railroad grade, passes through the city.

== Demographics ==
Historical population
Census	Pop.	Note	%±
1910	251		—
1920	333		32.7%
1930	308		−7.5%
1940	300		−2.6%
1950	278		−7.3%
1960	262		−5.8%
1970	265		1.1%
1980	241		−9.1%
1990	200		−17.0%
2000	215		7.5%
2010	214		−0.5%
2020	227		6.1%
2021 (est.)	225		−0.9%
U.S. Decennial Census; 2020 Census

=== 2010 census ===
As of the census of 2010, there were 214 people, 83 households, and 59 families residing in the city. The population density was 648.5 inhabitants per square mile (250.4/km^{2}). There were 96 housing units at an average density of 290.9 per square mile (112.3/km^{2}). The racial makeup of the city was 95.8% White, 2.3% African American, 0.5% Native American, 0.5% Asian, and 0.9% from two or more races. Hispanic or Latino of any race were 0.5% of the population.

There were 83 households, of which 28.9% had children under the age of 18 living with them, 62.7% were married couples living together, 6.0% had a female householder with no husband present, 2.4% had a male householder with no wife present, and 28.9% were non-families. 25.3% of all households were made up of individuals, and 12% had someone living alone who was 65 years of age or older. The average household size was 2.58 and the average family size was 3.14.

The median age in the city was 40.5 years. 29% of residents were under the age of 18; 5.1% were between the ages of 18 and 24; 26.2% were from 25 to 44; 22.4% were from 45 to 64; and 17.3% were 65 years of age or older. The gender makeup of the city was 51.9% male and 48.1% female.

=== 2000 census ===
As of the census of 2000, there were 215 people, 83 households, and 54 families residing in the city. The population density was 669.0 inhabitants per square mile (258.3/km^{2}). There were 93 housing units at an average density of 289.4 per square mile (111.7/km^{2}). The racial makeup of the city was 99.07% White, and 0.93% from two or more races. Hispanic or Latino of any race were 0.93% of the population.

There were 83 households, out of which 33.7% had children under the age of 18 living with them, 59.0% were married couples living together, 3.6% had a female householder with no husband present, and 34.9% were non-families. 31.3% of all households were made up of individuals, and 14.5% had someone living alone who was 65 years of age or older. The average household size was 2.55 and the average family size was 3.30.

In the city, the population was spread out, with 30.7% under the age of 18, 3.3% from 18 to 24, 30.7% from 25 to 44, 18.6% from 45 to 64, and 16.7% who were 65 years of age or older. The median age was 36 years. For every 100 females, there were 102.8 males. For every 100 females age 18 and over, there were 106.9 males.

The median income for a household in the city was $36,875, and the median income for a family was $47,250. Males had a median income of $29,844 versus $15,938 for females. The per capita income for the city was $15,683. About 6.8% of families and 14.8% of the population were below the poverty line, including 12.3% of those under the age of eighteen and 26.5% of those 65 or over.
