= Ulen sword =

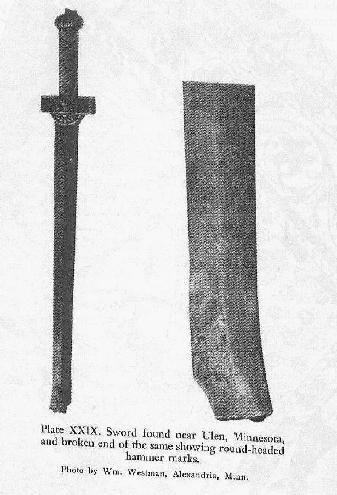
A newspaper article displaying the Ulen Sword

The Ulen Sword is an artifact which was unearthed in a field 3.25 miles (5.23 km) west of Ulen in Clay County, Minnesota. It is currently on display in the Ulen Museum (formerly the Viking Sword Museum), which is operated by the Ulen Historical Society. At first purported to be a Viking sword by Norse coloniers, it bears little resemblance to any sword of known early medieval provenance; it is more probably a 19th-century military sword. Hjalmar Holand's book Pre-Columbian Crusade to America (1962) argues that the sword is authentic. The sword was also featured in an America Unearthed episode, where it was taken to a specialist at The Oakeshott Institute, who believed it to have been a mass-produced sword from Weyersberg, Kirschbaum and Co in Germany. Even though the validity of the sword is still debated, it remains an important artifact in the town of Ulen.

The sword was found buried underground by Hans O. Hansen on his farm on April 20, 1911. Because of drought, Hansen decided to set his plow blades much deeper than usual and unearthed the artifact. The blade of the Ulen sword is said to have had a 0.0625 in (1.59 mm) covering of rust, which Hansen polished away. The blade is 16 inches (410 mm) long. The end of the sword has been blunted by a hammer or some other instrument. The pommel and the thick crossguard are made of brass. The sword's crossguard has a design on each side: one side depicts a helmeted soldier, and the reverse is a breastplate covering a dagger and two crossed axes.

== Other sources ==
- Rath, Jay; Elizabeth McBride; Chris Roerden (1998) The M-files: True Reports of Minnesota's Unexplained Phenomena (Big Earth Publishing) ISBN 9780915024667
- Oakeshott, R.E. (1996) The Archaeology of Weapons, Arms and Armour from Prehistory to the Age of Chivalry (New York: Dover Publications Inc) ISBN 978048629288-5.
