= Twin Valley, Minnesota =

City in Minnesota, United States

Twin Valley
- City
- Motto: "A Great Place To Live"
- Location of Twin Valley, Minnesota
- Coordinates: 47°15′35″N 96°15′26″W
- Country: United States
- State: Minnesota
- County: Norman

Area
  - Total: 0.85 sq mi (2.21 km^{2})
  - Land: 0.85 sq mi (2.21 km^{2})
  - Water: 0 sq mi (0.00 km^{2})
- Elevation: 1,093 ft (333 m)

Population (2020)
  - Total: 723
  - Estimate (2021): 718
  - Density: 846/sq mi (326.5/km^{2})
- Time zone: UTC-6 (CST)
  - Summer (DST): UTC-5 (CDT)
- ZIP code: 56584
- Area code: 218
- FIPS code: 27-65938
- GNIS feature ID: 0653465
- Website: twinvalleymn.com

Twin Valley is a city in Norman County, Minnesota, United States, along the Wild Rice River. The population was 723 at the 2020 census.

Minnesota State Highway 32 and County Highway 31 are two of the main routes in the community. Minnesota State Highway 200 is nearby. The Agassiz Recreational Trail passes through Twin Valley.

== History ==
A post office called Twin Valley has been in operation since 1878. The city was named for its location in a valley where the Wild Rice River is met by a smaller stream.

== Geography ==
According to the United States Census Bureau, the city has an area of 0.87 square miles (2.25 km^{2}), all land.

== Demographics ==
Historical population
Census	Pop.	Note	%±
1900	356		—
1910	543		52.5%
1920	676		24.5%
1930	657		−2.8%
1940	844		28.5%
1950	899		6.5%
1960	841		−6.5%
1970	868		3.2%
1980	907		4.5%
1990	821		−9.5%
2000	865		5.4%
2010	821		−5.1%
2020	723		−11.9%
2021 (est.)	718		−0.7%
U.S. Decennial Census; 2020 Census

=== 2010 census ===
As of the census of 2010, there were 821 people, 357 households, and 193 families living in the city. The population density was 943.7 inhabitants per square mile (364.4/km^{2}). There were 431 housing units at an average density of 495.4 per square mile (191.3/km^{2}). The racial makeup of the city was 94.4% White, 3.2% Native American, 0.7% from other races, and 1.7% from two or more races. Hispanic or Latino of any race were 2.1% of the population.

There were 357 households, of which 25.8% had children under the age of 18 living with them, 40.3% were married couples living together, 8.1% had a female householder with no husband present, 5.6% had a male householder with no wife present, and 45.9% were non-families. 43.4% of all households were made up of individuals, and 28.3% had someone living alone who was 65 years of age or older. The average household size was 2.17 and the average family size was 2.96.

The median age in the city was 46.8 years. 24.2% of residents were under the age of 18; 5.2% were between the ages of 18 and 24; 18.6% were from 25 to 44; 22.4% were from 45 to 64; and 29.7% were 65 years of age or older. The gender makeup of the city was 48.5% male and 51.5% female.

=== 2000 census ===
As of the census of 2000, there were 865 people, 360 households, and 192 families living in the city. The population density was 987.0 inhabitants per square mile (381.1/km^{2}). There were 399 housing units at an average density of 455.3 per square mile (175.8/km^{2}). The racial makeup of the city was 94.68% White, 0.23% African American, 2.54% Native American, 0.58% from other races, and 1.97% from two or more races. Hispanic or Latino of any race were 2.31% of the population.

There were 360 households, out of which 24.4% had children under the age of 18 living with them, 42.5% were married couples living together, 9.2% had a female householder with no husband present, and 46.4% were non-families. 43.6% of all households were made up of individuals, and 30.3% had someone living alone who was 65 years of age or older. The average household size was 2.11 and the average family size was 2.93.

In the city, the population was spread out, with 20.3% under the age of 18, 8.2% from 18 to 24, 18.4% from 25 to 44, 16.8% from 45 to 64, and 36.3% who were 65 years of age or older. The median age was 48 years. For every 100 females, there were 87.2 males. For every 100 females age 18 and over, there were 79.9 males.

The median income for a household in the city was $23,083, and the median income for a family was $35,357. Males had a median income of $27,955 versus $19,205 for females. The per capita income for the city was $13,865. About 8.4% of families and 10.9% of the population were below the poverty line, including 14.5% of those under age 18 and 12.3% of those age 65 or over.
