= Lolipora =

- Panchayat Halqa
- Lolipur
- Location in Jammu and Kashmir, India Lolipora (India)
- Coordinates: 34.216149319672°N 74.53582272547806°E
- Country: India
- State: Jammu and Kashmir
- District: Baramulla
- Tehsil: Pattan
- Post Office: Pattan
- Pincode: 193121

Population (2011)
  - Total: 1,340

Languages
  - Official: Kashmiri, Urdu, Hindi, Dogri, English

Lolipora, also known as Lolipur, is a village and a Panchayat Halqa in Pattan tehsil of Baramulla district in the Indian union territory of Jammu and Kashmir. It is located 23 km (14 mi) towards east of district headquarters, Baramulla and 32 km (20 mi) from the summer capital of Jammu and Kashmir, Srinagar. Sopore, Baramulla, Bandipora and Srinagar are the nearby cities to Lolipora.

== Geographical location ==
Lolipora is located between latitude 34.216149319672°N and longitude 74.53582272547806°E . The landscape is made up of plateau like terraces known as Karewas. On the northern side of Lolipora lies the wetland Rakh-e-Hygam.

== Demographics ==
As of 2011 India Census, Lolipora has a total population of 1,340, out of which 718 are males and 622 are females. Lolipora has total of 130 family residing. The literacy rate of Lolipora is 69.2%.

== Education ==
The Government Boys Middle School is one of the oldest School in the area imparting education to the common folks. 'Abu Baker Memorial Trust' is another middle school in the area. Besides these the educational institutes around lolipora include.

- Government Boys Higher Secondary School Goshbugh.
- Government Boys Higher Secondary School Pattan.
- Government Boys Higher Secondary School Palhallan.

== Religion ==
People of Lolipora follow Sunni Islam. Religious education is imparted through madrassas in the morning and evening.
