= Crookston School District 593 =

School district in Minnesota, United States

Address
- 402 Fisher Avenue Suite 593 Crookston, Minnesota, 56716; United States

District information
- Type: Public
- Grades: PreK–12
- NCES District ID: 2709720

Students and staff
- Students: 1,170
- Teachers: 82.43
- Staff: 98.05
- Student–teacher ratio: 14.19

Other information
- Website: www.crookston.k12.mn.us

Crookston School District 593 (Independent School District #593) or Crookston Public Schools (CPS) is a school district headquartered in Crookston, Minnesota.

== Schools ==
Zoned schools

- Crookston High School - Grades 7-12
- Highland Elementary School - Grades 1-6
- Washington Elementary School - Preschool and kindergarten

Others

- New Paths Alternative Learning Center (ALC) - grades 9-12
- Northern Lights Academy
