= Miner A. Helgeson =

American politician (1884–1950)

Miner A. Helgeson (February 2, 1884 – October 20, 1950) was an American farmer and politician.

Helgeson was born on February 2, 1884, on a farm in Fisher, Minnesota, and went to the Polk County Public Schools. He lived in Crookston, Minnesota with his wife and family and was a farmer. Helgeson worked for the Minnesota Department of Agriculture and was an inspector. He served on the Crookston Board of Education. Helgeson also served on the Polk County Commission and was the county commission chair. He served on the Andover Township Board. Helgeson served in the Minnesota House of Representatives from 1929 to 1935.
