= Marsh River (Minnesota) =

Coordinates: 47.46997°N 96.86036°W

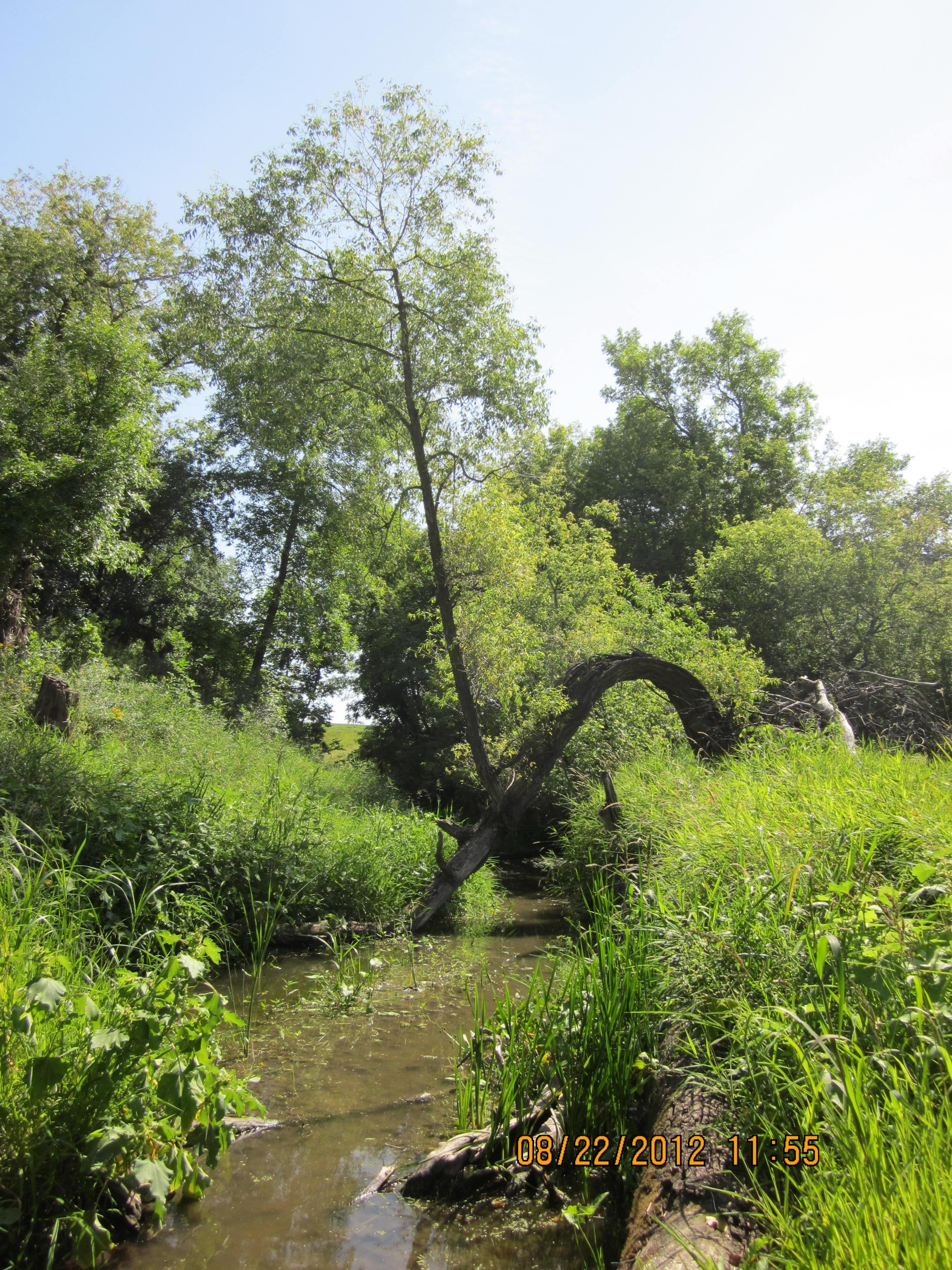
- Marsh River near Shelly, Minnesota.

Location
- Country: United States

Physical characteristics
- Source
  - location: Minnesota

The Marsh River, located in Minnesota, is a 49.9-mile-long (80.3 km) tributary of the Red River of the North. It rises less than 600 feet (180 m) from the Wild Rice River, east of the city of Ada, and flows generally northwest, entering the Red River 2 miles (3 km) northwest of Shelly. The Marsh River flows entirely within Norman County.

Marsh River was named for the wetlands near the stream.

== See also ==
- List of rivers of Minnesota
- List of Hudson Bay rivers
