= Julius Spokely =

American politician (1877–1954)

Julius Spokely (May 27, 1877 – August 12, 1954) was an American businessman and politician.

Spokely was born un Polk County, Minnesota and lived in Crookston, Minnesota. He was a land owner and operator. Spokely served as sheriff of Polk County. He also served in the Minnesota Senate from 1947 to 1950.
