= Singhpora =

Singhpora Singhpur
- Town
- Location in India
- Coordinates: 34°8′50″N 74°37′0″E
- Country: India
- Union territory: Jammu and Kashmir
- District: Baramulla

Area
  - Urban: 3.1 sq mi (8 km^{2})
- Elevation: 5,108 ft (1,557 m)

Population (2015)
  - Town: 25,000
  - Density: 130/sq mi (52/km^{2})

Languages
  - Official: Kashmiri, Urdu, Hindi, Dogri, English
- Time zone: 5:30 UTC
- PIN: 193121
- Area code: 0195

Singhpora or Singhpur is a town and municipality located on the Srinagar–Baramulla road (part of National Highway 44) in Baramulla district of the Indian union territory of Jammu and Kashmir.
