= Pattan railway station =

Railway station in Baramulla, India

Pattan

General information
- Location: Baramulla, Jammu and Kashmir; India
- Coordinates: 34.1659°N 74.5632°E
- System: Indian Railways station
- Owner: Indian Railways
- Operator: Northern Railways
- Line: Jammu–Baramulla line
- Platforms: 2
- Tracks: 2

Construction
- Parking: yes

Other information
- Station code: PTTN
- Zone(s): Northern Railway
- Division(s): Jammu

History
- Opened: 2008
Location

Pattan Railway Station is the station on Northern railway network zone of Indian Railways.

== Location ==
The station is situated in Pattan in Baramulla district, Jammu and Kashmir.

== History ==
The station has been built as part of the Jammu–Baramulla line megaproject, intending to link the Kashmir Valley with Jammu Tawi and the Indian railway network.

== Design ==
Like the other railway stations in this megaproject, this station features Kashmiri wood architecture, with an intended ambience of a royal court which is designed to complement the local surroundings to the station. Station signage is predominantly in Urdu, English and Hindi.

== Reduced level ==
The RL of the station is 1581 m above mean sea level.

== See also ==
- Baramulla railway station
