= Philip Hamre =

American politician (1897–1961)

Philip Hamre (February 25, 1897 – December 8, 1961) was an American medical technician and politician.

Hamre was born in Sayre, Norman County, Minnesota and went to the public schools. He went to Concordia College in Moorhead, Minnesota and to Northwestern Institute of Medical Technology in Minneapolis, Minnesota. Hamre lived in Crookston, Minnesota and was a medical technician. He also served on the Crookston City Council. He served in the Minnesota House of Representatives from 1943 to 1946.
