= Hamre, Jammu and Kashmir =

Hamray
- Village
- Hamre
- Location in Baramulla, India Hamray (India)
- Coordinates: 34.13°N 74.31°E
- Country: India
- Union Territory: Jammu and Kashmir
- District: Baramulla
- Tehsil: Pattan
- Post Office: Pattan

Population
  - Total: 3,000

Languages
  - Official: Kashmiri, Urdu, Hindi, Dogri, English
- Time zone: UTC+5:30 (IST)
- PIN: 193121
- Vehicle registration: JK05

Hamray or Hamre (Urdu pronunciation: [ɦɑːmˌɾeː]) is a village in the Pattan tehsil of Baramulla district in Jammu and Kashmir, India, located 7 km away from Pattan town along the Srinagar- Baramulla highway.

== Establishments and institutions ==
There are various Govt. and private schools of varied levels from Kindergarten to High school in this village, where not only children of this village but also from other neighbouring villages get education.Private Schools like Alamdar Educational Institute and Firdous Educational Institute situated in this village are well-known for their quality education in and around the village.

=== Hamre railway station ===
Hamre railway station is situated in the outskirts of Hamre village. It lies on Northern Railway Network Zone of Indian Railways. It is the third last station of Northern Railway Network Zone.

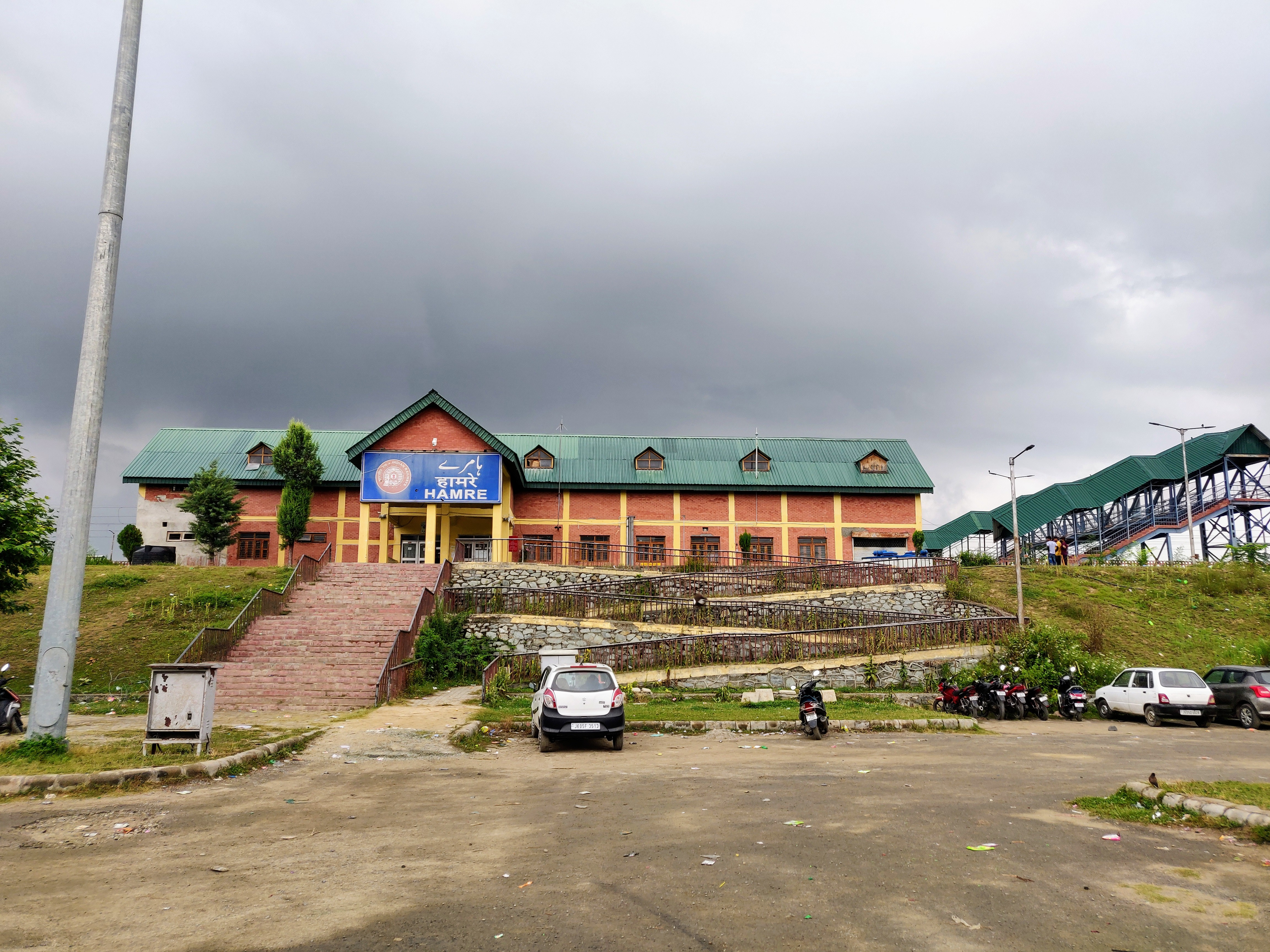
Hamre railway station (July, 2022)

== Religion ==
People of Hamre follow Sunni Islam. Religious education is imparted through madrassas in the morning and evening.
