= Wild Rice River (Minnesota) =

River in Minnesota, United States

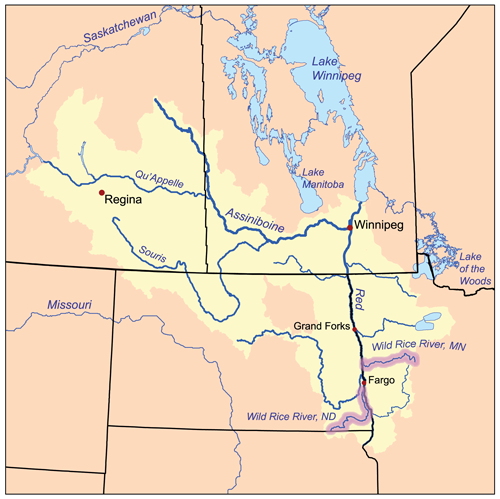
- The Red River drainage basin, with both Wild Rice rivers highlighted

- Mouth of the Wild Rice River

Location
- Country: United States
- State: Minnesota
- Counties: Norman County, Mahnomen County, Clearwater County

Physical characteristics
- Source
  - coordinates: 47.3841234°N 95.3083507°W
- Mouth
  - coordinates: 47.3180°N 96.8373°W
- Length: 183 miles (295 km)

Basin features
- River system: Red River of the North
- Tributaries
  - right: White Earth River

The Wild Rice River is a tributary of the Red River of the North in northwestern Minnesota in the United States. It is 183 miles (295 km) long. Via the Red River, Lake Winnipeg and the Nelson River, it is part of the watershed of Hudson Bay. It is one of two Red River tributaries with the same name, the other being the Wild Rice River of North Dakota.

Wild Rice River is an English translation of the native Ojibwe language name.

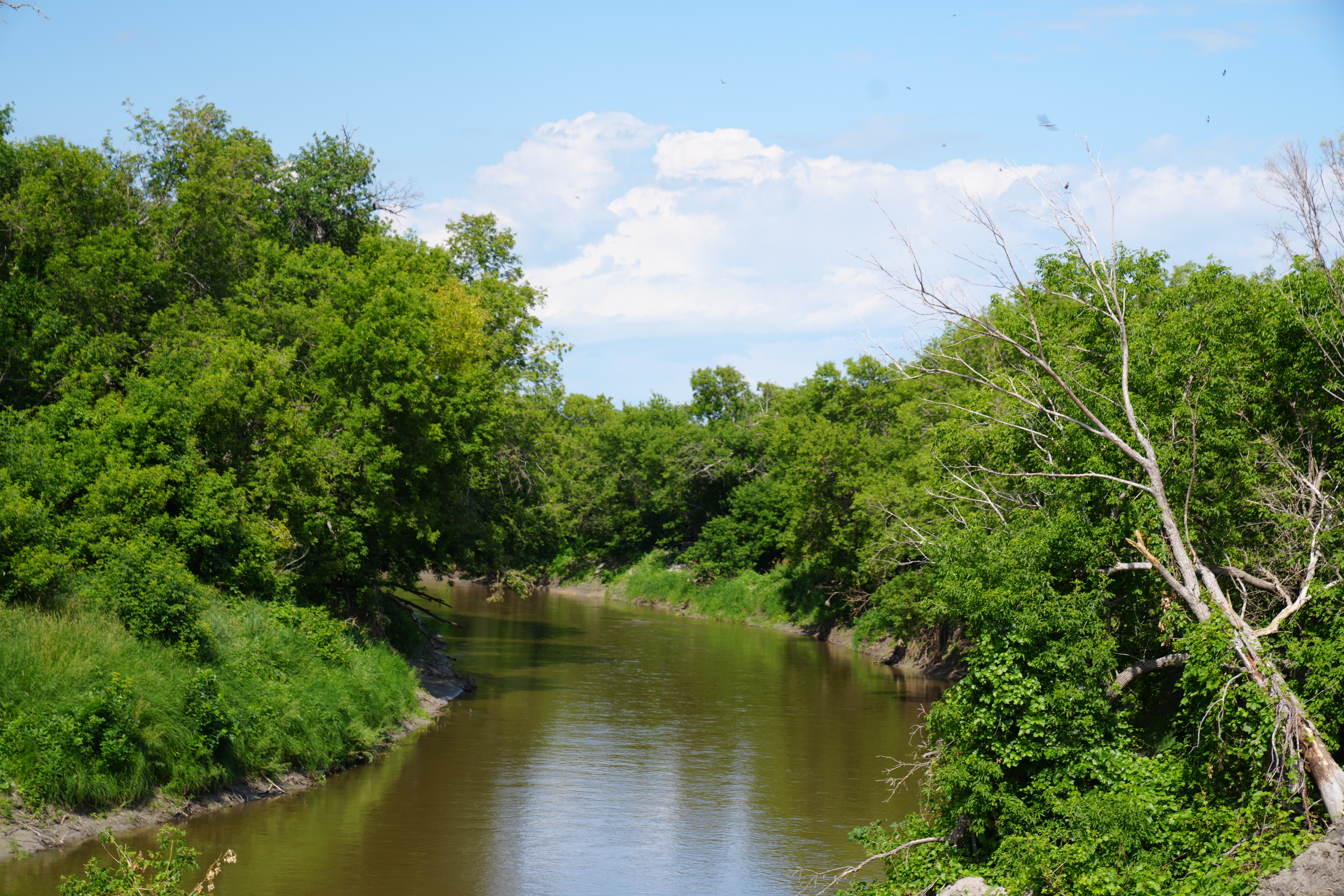
Wild Rice River (Minnesota)

== Course ==
The Wild Rice flows from Mud Lake in Clearwater County and follows a generally westwardly course through Mahnomen, Norman and Clay counties, through the White Earth Indian Reservation and past the towns of Mahnomen, Twin Valley, Ulen and Hendrum, and just south of Ada, where the nearby headwaters of the Marsh River sometimes act as a distributary to the Red River during periods of high water. In its lower reaches through the Red River Valley, portions of its course have been straightened and channelized.

== Tributaries ==
The Wild Rice River's largest tributaries are the White Earth River, which joins it near Mahnomen, and the South Branch Wild Rice River, which joins it in its lower course in Norman County; the South Branch rises near Ogema in northwestern Becker County and flows 61.4 miles (98.8 km) generally westwardly through Clay and Norman counties, past the town of Ulen.

== See also ==
- List of Minnesota rivers
- List of longest streams of Minnesota
- List of Minnesota placenames of Native American origin
