= Chad Hamre =

Canadian businessman

Chad Hamre is the CEO and co-founder of Ethical Ocean- a social business incorporated federally in Canada in 2008. Hamre was born and raised in Saskatoon, Saskatchewan. He holds a master's degree in Development Management from the London School of Economics and a bachelor's degree in Mechanical Engineering from the University of Saskatchewan. In 2005, he was awarded the Student Gold Medal by Engineers Canada. In 2008, he was awarded the Outstanding Young Alumni Award by the University of Saskatchewan Alumni Association.
