= Crookston High School =

Location
- 402 Fisher Ave; Crookston, Minnesota 56716; United States; 47.7900°N 96.6028°W

Information
- Type: Public
- Established: 1914
- School district: Crookston School District 593
- Principal: Matthew Torgerson
- Teaching staff: 39.95 (on FTE basis)
- Grades: 7 to 12
- Enrollment: 616 (2023–2024)
- Student to teacher ratio: 15.42
- Colors: Navy blue and gold
- Athletics conference: MSHSL Region 8A
- Sports: Boys: football, soccer, basketball, hockey, wrestling, tennis, track and field, baseball, golf, trap shooting Girls: soccer, volleyball, swimming, cross country, tennis, basketball, hockey, track and field, softball, golf, trap shooting
- Mascot: Pirates
- Nickname: Pirates
- Team name: Pirates
- Website: www.crookston.k12.mn.us/crookston-high-school

Crookston High School is a public high school located in Crookston, Minnesota, United States. The school, a part of Crookston School District 593, serves about 600 students in grades 7 through 12. There are 7 hours a day, with each class taking up to 55 minutes. School starts at 8:20 AM and ends at 3:15 PM.
