= Crookston, Minnesota =

City in Minnesota, United States

- City
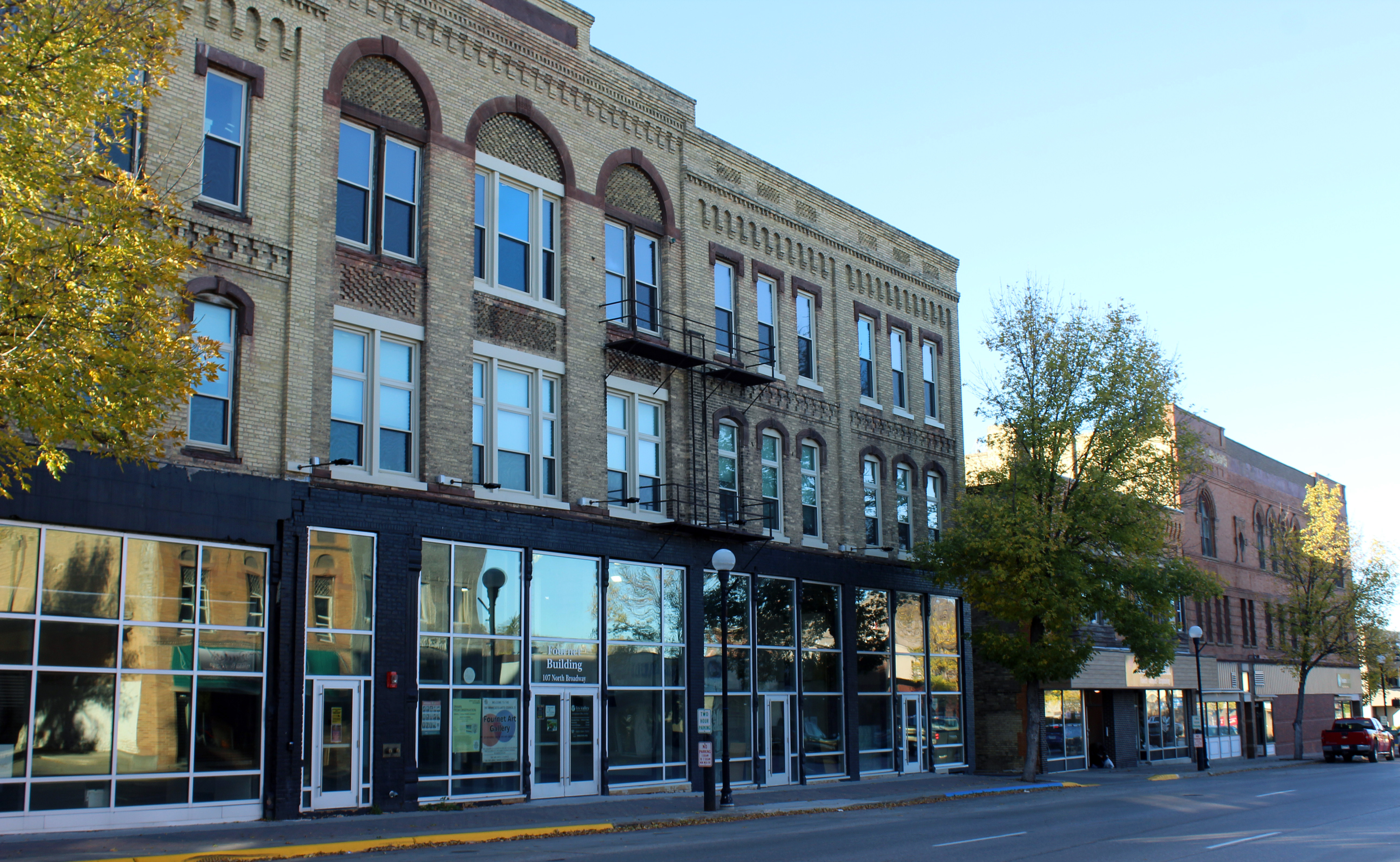
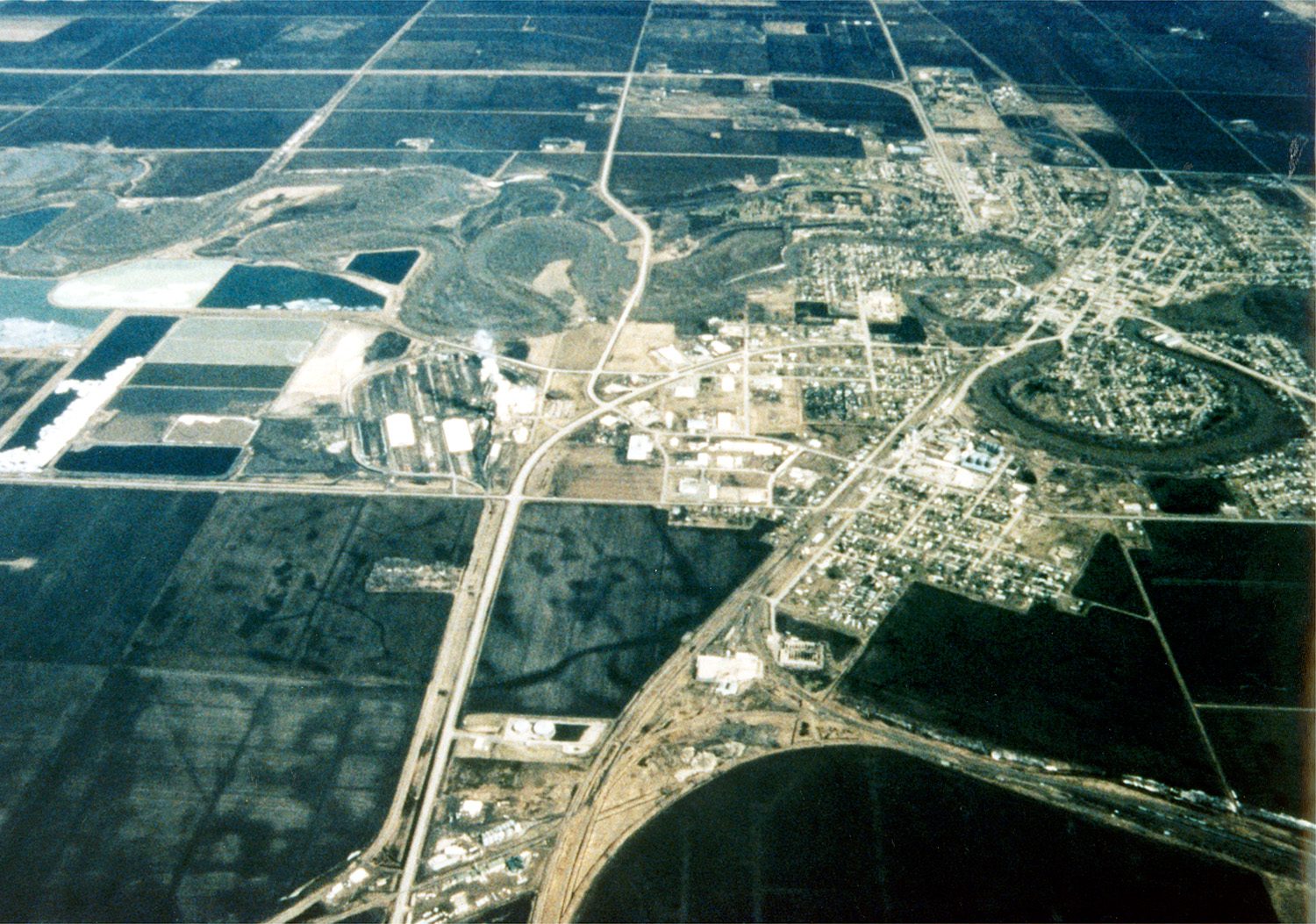
- Crookston Commercial Historic District Aerial view of Crookston, Minnesota, with the Red Lake River twisting through the town, 1996

- Seal

- Location of Crookston in Polk County, Minnesota

- Location in the United States
- Coordinates: 47°46′29″N 96°36′23″W
- Country: United States
- State: Minnesota
- County: Polk
- Metro: Greater Grand Forks
- Settled: 1872
- Organized: 1876
- Incorporated: February 14, 1879
- Named for: Col. William Crooks

Government
  - Type: Mayor–council
  - Mayor: Dale Stainbrook
  - City administrator: Darin Selzler (acting)

Area
  - City: 5.115 sq mi (13.249 km^{2})
  - Land: 5.115 sq mi (13.249 km^{2})
  - Water: 0 sq mi (0.000 km^{2})
  - Urban: 4.649 sq mi (12.040 km^{2})
  - Metro: 3,407 sq mi (8,825 km^{2})
- Elevation: 873 ft (266 m)

Population (2020)
  - City: 7,482
  - Estimate (2024): 7,269
  - Density: 1,420.9/sq mi (548.61/km^{2})
  - Urban: 7,618
  - Urban density: 1,639/sq mi (632.7/km^{2})
  - Metro: 103,120
  - Metro density: 30.3/sq mi (11.69/km^{2})
- Time zone: UTC−6 (Central (CST))
  - Summer (DST): UTC−5 (CDT)
- ZIP Code: 56716
- Area code: 218
- FIPS code: 27-13870
- GNIS feature ID: 2393678
- Website: crookston.mn.us

Crookston is a city in the U.S. state of Minnesota. It is the county seat of Polk County. The population was 7,482 at the 2020 census. It is part of the Greater Grand Forks metropolitan statistical area.

Crookston is the episcopal seat of the Diocese of Crookston. Crookston is partially a commuter town to the larger city of Grand Forks, North Dakota.

== History ==
Crookston was settled around 1872. It was the site of a federal land office by 1876 and sited on a portion of the Great Northern Railway that began operation by 1880. The town was incorporated on April 1, 1879 as "Queen City". By the end of that year, the town had a jail, graded streets, and a few plank sidewalks. Soon, it was decided that the town needed a new name. Two factions emerged supporting two different names. One wished to honor the town's first mayor, Captain Ellerey C. Davis, with the name Davis. Another group picked the name Crookston to honor Col. William Crooks, chief engineer of the Great Northern Railway which was built through the community. The name was reportedly chosen by coin toss.

Soon, Scandinavian, French-Canadian, and German immigrants began populating Crookston. At one point, eight different railroad lines reached the town, and it became a center of commerce and manufacturing.

== Geography ==
According to the United States Census Bureau, the city has a total area of 5.115 square miles (13.25 km^{2}), all land.

Crookston sits in the fertile Red River Valley, once a part of glacial Lake Agassiz. As Lake Agassiz receded, it left behind rich mineral deposits. This made the area around Crookston prime for agricultural uses. Grains such as wheat and other crops, including sugar beets and potatoes, grow well in the area around Crookston.

The Red Lake River flows through the city.

=== Climate ===
Climate data for Crookston, Minnesota, 1991–2020 normals, extremes 1890–present
Month	Jan	Feb	Mar	Apr	May	Jun	Jul	Aug	Sep	Oct	Nov	Dec	Year
Record high °F (°C)	57 (14)	63 (17)	78 (26)	96 (36)	101 (38)	102 (39)	105 (41)	104 (40)	99 (37)	89 (32)	73 (23)	56 (13)	105 (41)
Mean maximum °F (°C)	37.7 (3.2)	39.4 (4.1)	54.2 (12.3)	74.2 (23.4)	85.4 (29.7)	89.6 (32.0)	90.7 (32.6)	91.6 (33.1)	88.4 (31.3)	77.2 (25.1)	56.3 (13.5)	40.7 (4.8)	93.9 (34.4)
Mean daily maximum °F (°C)	15.8 (−9.0)	20.4 (−6.4)	34.0 (1.1)	51.3 (10.7)	66.6 (19.2)	76.0 (24.4)	80.3 (26.8)	79.6 (26.4)	70.4 (21.3)	54.1 (12.3)	36.2 (2.3)	22.4 (−5.3)	50.6 (10.3)
Daily mean °F (°C)	6.1 (−14.4)	10.1 (−12.2)	24.4 (−4.2)	40.7 (4.8)	54.7 (12.6)	65.1 (18.4)	69.1 (20.6)	67.4 (19.7)	58.2 (14.6)	43.7 (6.5)	27.5 (−2.5)	13.8 (−10.1)	40.1 (4.5)
Mean daily minimum °F (°C)	−3.6 (−19.8)	−0.2 (−17.9)	14.8 (−9.6)	30.1 (−1.1)	42.8 (6.0)	54.3 (12.4)	57.8 (14.3)	55.2 (12.9)	46.0 (7.8)	33.3 (0.7)	18.8 (−7.3)	5.2 (−14.9)	29.5 (−1.4)
Mean minimum °F (°C)	−27.9 (−33.3)	−23.0 (−30.6)	−10.8 (−23.8)	14.5 (−9.7)	27.8 (−2.3)	41.1 (5.1)	46.0 (7.8)	42.8 (6.0)	30.4 (−0.9)	18.3 (−7.6)	−1.6 (−18.7)	−17.2 (−27.3)	−28.4 (−33.6)
Record low °F (°C)	−44 (−42)	−51 (−46)	−39 (−39)	−10 (−23)	6 (−14)	27 (−3)	38 (3)	31 (−1)	11 (−12)	−2 (−19)	−30 (−34)	−38 (−39)	−51 (−46)
Average precipitation inches (mm)	0.51 (13)	0.53 (13)	0.73 (19)	1.27 (32)	2.75 (70)	4.15 (105)	3.27 (83)	2.97 (75)	2.60 (66)	2.09 (53)	0.82 (21)	0.74 (19)	22.43 (569)
Average precipitation days (≥ 0.01 in)	6.4	5.8	5.9	6.2	10.0	10.7	9.3	8.2	8.1	7.3	5.7	7.3	90.9
Source: NOAA

== Demographics ==
Historical population
Census	Pop.	Note	%±
1880	1,227		—
1890	3,457		181.7%
1900	5,359		55.0%
1910	7,559		41.1%
1920	6,825		−9.7%
1930	6,321		−7.4%
1940	7,161		13.3%
1950	7,352		2.7%
1960	8,546		16.2%
1970	8,312		−2.7%
1980	8,628		3.8%
1990	8,119		−5.9%
2000	8,192		0.9%
2010	7,891		−3.7%
2020	7,482		−5.2%
2024 (est.)	7,269		−2.8%
U.S. Decennial Census; 2020 Census

Crookston has not seen major population growth since the 1970s. The economy has suffered due to a lack of well-paying jobs and available housing.

As of the 2022 American Community Survey, there are 3,321 estimated households in Crookston with an average of 2.04 persons per household. The city has a median household income of $52,557. Approximately 15.3% of the city's population lives at or below the poverty line. Crookston has an estimated 60.8% employment rate, with 29.4% of the population holding a bachelor's degree or higher and 94.2% holding a high school diploma.

The top five reported ancestries (people were allowed to report up to two ancestries, thus the figures will generally add to more than 100%) were English (92.5%), Spanish (5.0%), Indo-European (0.3%), Asian and Pacific Islander (1.6%), and Other (0.6%).

=== Racial and ethnic composition ===
Crookston, Minnesota – racial and ethnic composition Note: the US Census treats Hispanic/Latino as an ethnic category. This table excludes Latinos from the racial categories and assigns them to a separate category. Hispanics/Latinos may be of any race.
Race / ethnicity (NH = non-Hispanic)	Pop. 2000	Pop. 2010	Pop. 2020	% 2000	% 2010	% 2020
White alone (NH)	7,196	6,576	5,695	87.84%	83.34%	76.12%
Black or African American alone (NH)	35	99	238	0.43%	1.25%	3.18%
Native American or Alaska Native alone (NH)	119	109	95	1.45%	1.38%	1.27%
Asian alone (NH)	36	124	57	0.44%	1.57%	0.76%
Pacific Islander alone (NH)	0	0	3	0.00%	0.00%	0.04%
Other race alone (NH)	0	3	8	0.00%	0.04%	0.11%
Mixed race or multiracial (NH)	84	109	298	1.03%	1.38%	3.98%
Hispanic or Latino (any race)	722	871	1,088	8.81%	11.04%	14.54%
Total	8,192	7,891	7,482	100.00%	100.00%	100.00%

=== 2020 census ===
As of the 2020 census, there were 7,482 people, 3,087 households, and 1,647 families residing in the city.

The median age was 35.5 years. 23.2% of residents were under the age of 18 and 18.0% were 65 years of age or older. For every 100 females, there were 95.5 males, and for every 100 females age 18 and over, there were 94.0 males age 18 and over. 99.5% of residents lived in urban areas, while 0.5% lived in rural areas.

Of the city's households, 25.7% had children under the age of 18 living in them. Of all households, 37.0% were married-couple households, 24.8% were households with a male householder and no spouse or partner present, and 30.0% were households with a female householder and no spouse or partner present. About 40.0% of all households were made up of individuals, and 15.7% had someone living alone who was 65 years of age or older.

The population density was 1,446.4 inhabitants per square mile (558.5/km^{2}). There were 3,445 housing units at an average density of 666.0 inhabitants per square mile (257.1/km^{2}). Of all housing units, 10.4% were vacant. The homeowner vacancy rate was 1.5% and the rental vacancy rate was 11.9%.

=== 2010 census ===
As of the 2010 census, there were 7,891 people, 3,109 households, and 1,743 families residing in the city. The population density was 1,533.3 inhabitants per square mile (592.0/km^{2}). There were 3,303 housing units at an average density of 641.4 inhabitants per square mile (247.6/km^{2}). The racial makeup of the city was 90.24% White, 1.42% African American, 1.66% Native American, 1.58% Asian, 0.00% Pacific Islander, 2.79% from some other races and 2.31% from two or more races. Hispanic or Latino people of any race were 11.04% of the population.

There were 3,109 households, of which 28.5% had children under the age of 18 living with them. 40.3% were married couples living together, 11.1% had a female householder with no husband present, 4.7% had a male householder with no wife present, and 43.9% were non-families. 36.7% of all households were made up of individuals, and 13.3% had someone living alone who was 65 years of age or older. The average household size was 2.27 and the average family size was 2.97.

The median age in the city was 35.1 years. 22.3% of residents were under the age of 18; 16.7% were between the ages of 18 and 24; 20.5% were from 25 to 44; 25% were from 45 to 64; and 15.5% were 65 years of age or older. The gender makeup of the city was 49.4% male and 50.6% female.

=== 2000 census ===
As of the 2000 census, there were 8,192 people, 3,078 households, and 1,819 families residing in the city. The population density was 1,658.8 inhabitants per square mile (640.5/km^{2}). There were 3,382 housing units at an average density of 684.8 inhabitants per square mile (264.4/km^{2}). The racial makeup of the city was 90.5% White, 0.50% African American, 1.54% Native American, 0.49% Asian, 0.02% Pacific Islander, 4.64% from some other races and 1.56% from two or more races. Hispanic or Latino people of any race were 8.81% of the population.

There were 3,078 households, of which 30.5% had children under the age of 18 living with them, 46.5% were married couples living together, 9.6% had a female householder with no husband present, and 40.9% were non-families. 34.5% of all households were made up of individuals, and 15.5% had someone living alone who was 65 years of age or older. The average household size was 2.37 and the average family size was 3.10.

The city's age distribution shows 24.2% under the age of 18, 14.9% from 18 to 24, 23.8% from 25 to 44, 19.5% from 45 to 64, and 17.6% who were 65 years of age or older. The median age was 36 years. For every 100 females, there were 93.4 males. For every 100 females age 18 and over, there were 91.5 males.

The median income for a household in the city was $34,609, and the median income for a family was $44,157. Males had a median income of $30,564 versus $21,021 for females. The per capita income for the city was $17,219. About 7.5% of families and 12.5% of the population were below the poverty line, including 14.4% of those under age 18 and 14.7% of those age 65 or over.

== Economy ==
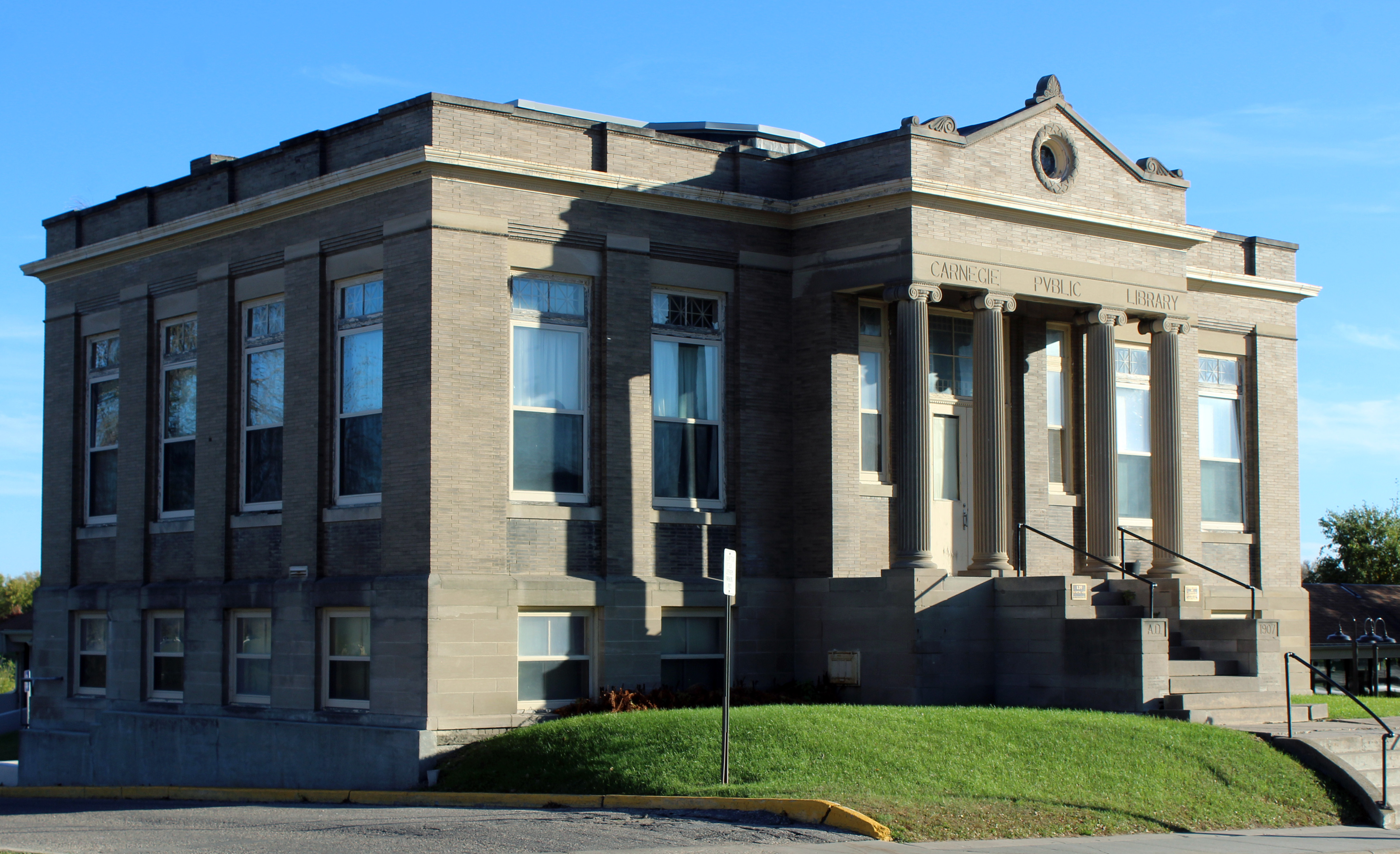
Carnegie Public Library

The American subsidiary of New Flyer, a Canadian bus maker, has a manufacturing facility in Crookston. In 2015, they employed 325 people at the Crookston plant.

== Arts and culture ==
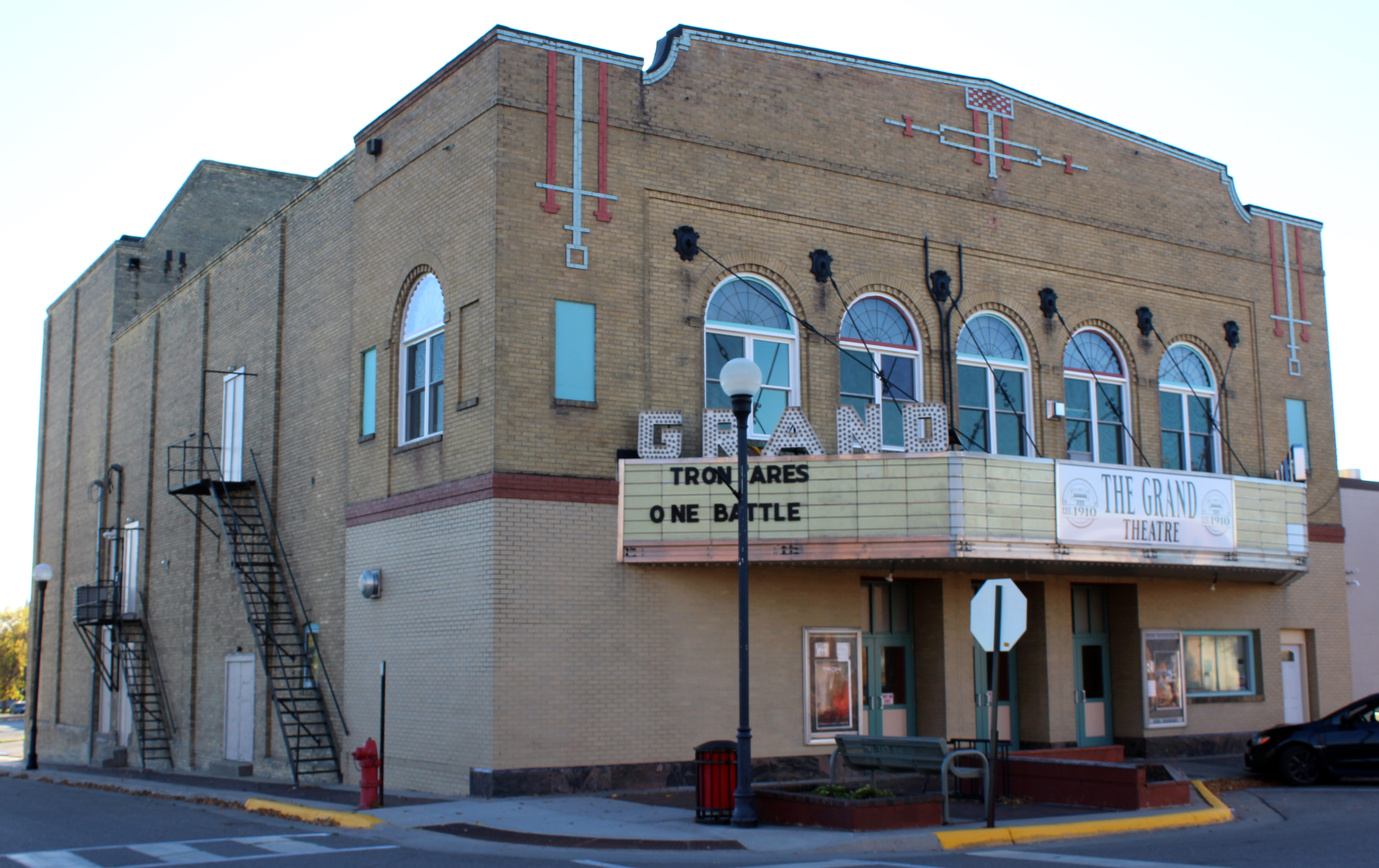
Grand Theatre

The Grand Theater in Crookston is the oldest continuously operating movie theater in the United States. Built in 1910, it served as an opera house until 1917, when it began to primarily show movies. Notable performers include early film actress Mary Pickford.

== Parks and recreation ==
Crookston is the northern terminus of the Agassiz Recreational Trail, a 53-mile multi-use trail built on an abandoned railroad grade that has its southern terminus at Ulen.

== Education ==
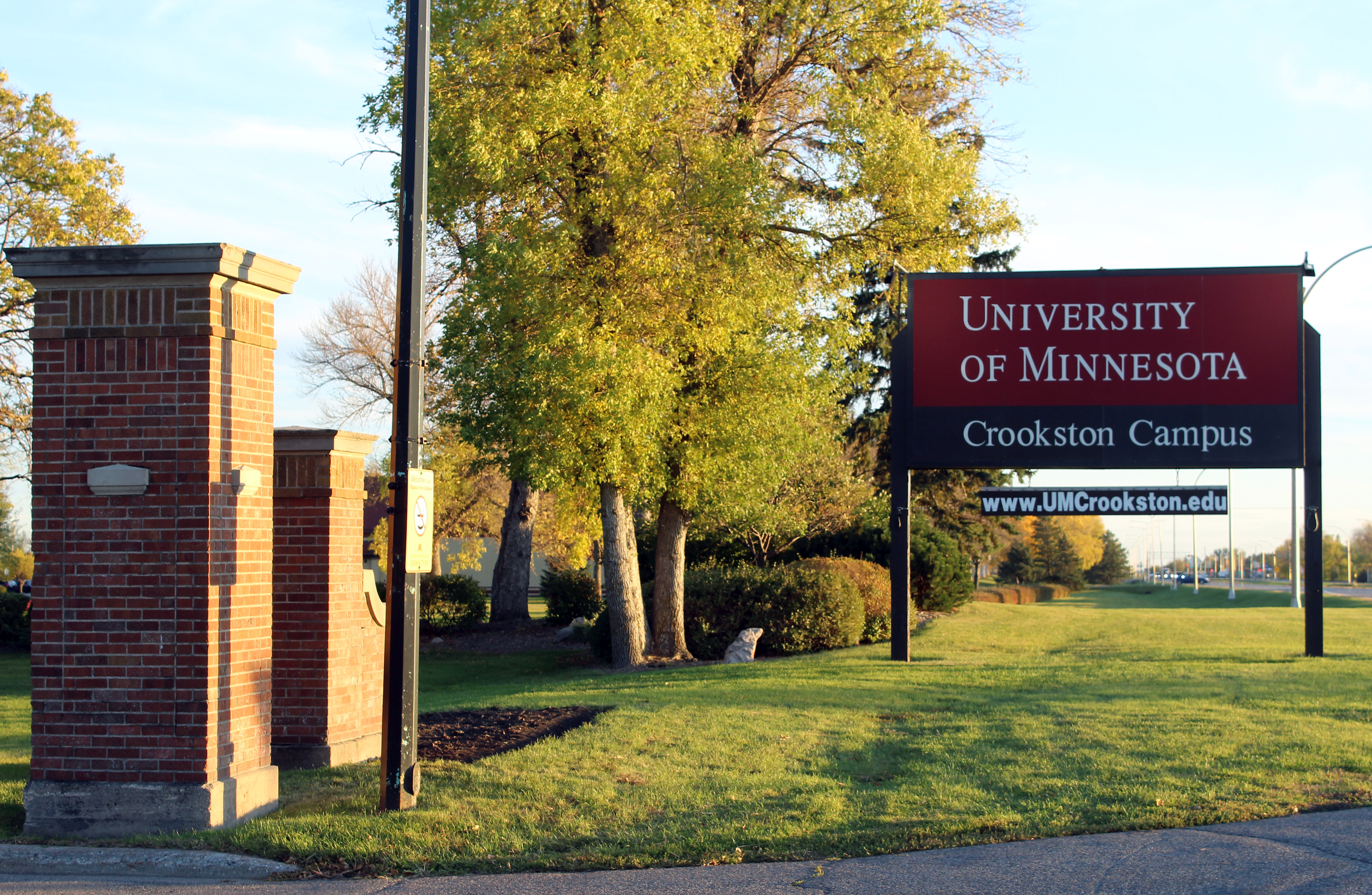
University of Minnesota - Crookston

=== K–12 ===
Public education is administered by Crookston School District 593. The school district enrolled 1,135 students in K-12 in the school year 2022–2023.

Students from the neighboring towns of Euclid, Gentilly, and Mentor attend Crookston High School, established in 1914.

Private elementary schools include Cathedral Elementary (Catholic, formerly Mount Saint Benedict High School), Our Savior's Lutheran, and Bible Baptist.

=== Higher education ===
Crookston has the University of Minnesota Crookston (a campus of the University of Minnesota system). It began as an agricultural high school before becoming a two-year college and then a four-year university. On January 30, 2010, the new Crookston Sports Center was dedicated. The university enrolled about 1,729 students in the fall 2024 term.

== Media ==
The local newspaper is the Crookston Daily Times.

=== Television ===
Crookston is part of the Fargo/Grand Forks television market. PBS member station KCGE (channel 16) is licensed to Crookston, serving Grand Forks.

=== Radio ===
KROX 1260 AM (also broadcast locally on translator K289CE 105.7 FM) specifically covers the community. Radio stations from Grand Forks, Thief River Falls, and KRJB 106.5 FM broadcasting from Ada can also be easily received. Radio stations KQHT 96.1 FM and KYCK 97.1 FM are also licensed to Crookston, but broadcast from Grand Forks and serve the region in general.

== Infrastructure ==
U.S. Highways 2 and 75 and Minnesota State Highways 9 and 102 are four of the main routes in the community.

== Notable people ==
- Dan Anderson, professional basketball player, was born in Crookston in 1943.
- Joseph H. Ball, U.S. senator from Minnesota from 1940 to 1949, was born in Crookston in 1905.
- John Christgau (1934–2018), an American author of fiction and non-fiction.
- Ronald N. Davies, judge of the United States District Court for the District of North Dakota, 1955–1985, was born in Crookston in 1904.
- Jules Ellingboe (1892–1948), racing driver.
- Philip Hamre, medical technician and Minnesota state legislator.
- Miner A. Helgeson, farmer and Minnesota state legislator.
- Leroy E. Matson, Minnesota Supreme Court justice.
- John Noah, ice hockey player, was born in Crookston in 1927.
- Julius Spokely, sheriff and Minnesota state legislator.
- Milton Orville Thompson, NASA astronaut and research scientist, was born in Crookston in 1926.
- Theodore W. Thorson, Minnesota state legislator and educator, was born in Crookston in 1922.
- Wes Westrum, played for the New York Giants.
- Ed Widseth, played for the New York Giants.
- Harvey A. Wilder (1907–1968), farmer and Minnesota state legislator.
