= Pattan =

Pattan zangam
- sub-urban town
- Location in Jammu and Kashmir, India Pattan zangam (India)
- Coordinates: 34.160°N 74.556°E
- Country: India
- Union territory: Jammu and Kashmir
- District: Baramulla

Area
  - Total: 0.8 km^{2} (0.31 sq mi)
- Elevation: 1,553 m (5,095 ft)

Population (2006)
  - Total: 16,409
  - Density: 21,000/km^{2} (53,000/sq mi)

Languages
  - Official: Kashmiri, Urdu, Hindi, Dogri, English
- Time zone: UTC+5:30 (IST)
- PIN: 193121

Pattan, is a sub-district town and a municipal community in Baramulla district within the Indian Union Territory of Jammu and Kashmir.

== Location ==
Pattan is surrounded by Breng Block towards North, Kunzer block towards the south, Narbal block towards east, Singhpora block towards west. This place is near the border of the Baramulla, Budgam and Ganderbal districts. Budgam district and Beerwah are south of this place.

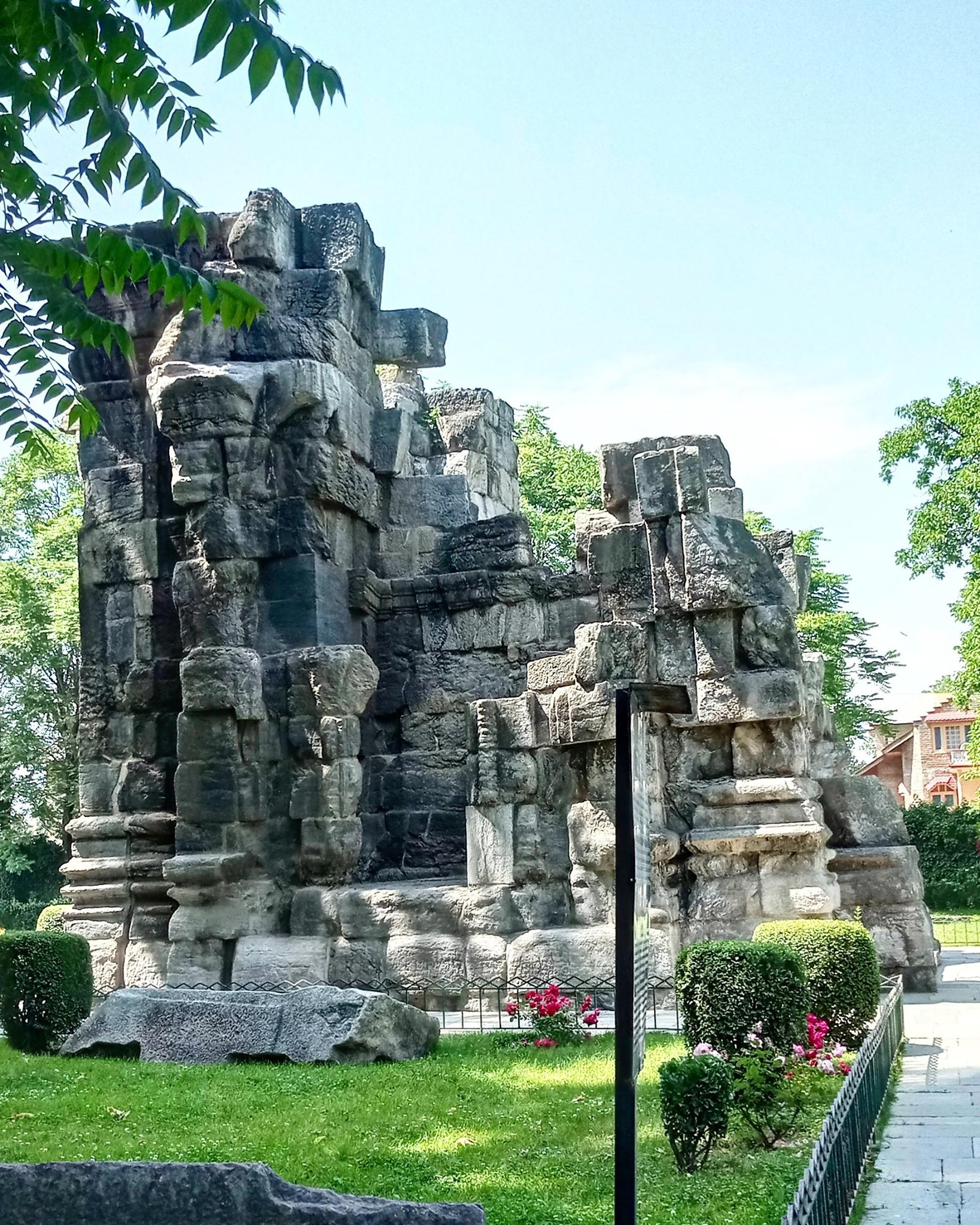
Shankaragaurishvara Temple (Oct 2021)

== Geography ==
Pattan is located at 34.17°N 74.57°E. It has an average elevation of 1,553 m (5,095 ft). Pattan is one of the historical capitals of Kashmir Valley, located nearly in the centre of the valley. Pattan tehsil has remains of four palaces including two in the municipal limits.

== Transport ==
Pattan is accessible through Pattan railway station, Hamre railway station and Mazhom railway station. However, Jammu Tawi is the major railway station about 290 km (180 mi) from Pattan. Via Jammu-Srinagar National Highway, it is only 27 km (17 mi) from Summer Capital Srinagar. Sheikh-ul-Alam International Airport at Srinagar is the nearest airport, 27 km (17 mi) southeast.

== Demographics ==
As of 2011 India census, Pattan had a population of 19,538 of whom 12,580 are males and 6,958 are female. Literacy rate of Pattan is 74.28% higher than the erstwhile state average of 67.16%. In Pattan, Male literacy is around 83.92% while female literacy rate is 55.91%. Population of children with age of 0-6 is 2,053 which is 10.51% of total population age.

== See also ==
- Lolipora
