= Abra =

Abra may refer to:

== Places ==
- Abra, Burkina Faso
- Abra, Ivory Coast
- Abra, Pakistan
- Abra (province), a province of the Philippines
  - Abra's at-large congressional district
  - Legislative district of Abra
- Abra, Texas
- Abra de Ilog, a municipality of Occidental Mindoro in the Philippines
- Abra River, in the Philippines
- Abra, Lebanon, a municipality of Lebanon
- Abra Channel, connecting the Magellan Strait with the Pacific Ocean
- El Abra, an archaeological site in Colombia

== People ==
- Abra (name), a given name and a surname
- Abra (singer), American singer
- Abra (Samma tribe) or Abro, an ethnic group in Pakistan

== Other uses ==
- American Boat Racing Association
- Abra (boat), a type of river-crossing boat in Dubai, United Arab Emirates
- Abra (bivalve), a genus of Semelidae clams
- ABRA (gene), a human gene located on chromosome 8
- Abra Group, holding company of Avianca Group, GOL Linhas Aéreas Inteligentes and Wamos Air
- Abra (company), an American financial services and technology company operating in the US and the Philippines
- Abra (motorcycle), an Italian motorcycle that was manufactured from 1923 to 1927
- Abra (Pokémon), a Pokémon species
- Abra, a novel by Joan Barfoot
- Abra, short for Abrakebabra, a fast food chain in Ireland

== See also ==
- Abro (disambiguation)
- Abracadabra (disambiguation), an incantation
- Goodliffe's Abracadabra (known by magicians as "Abra"), a weekly magic magazine that closed in 2009
