= Abra (name) =

Abra is both a given name and a surname. Notable people with the name include:

== Name ==
- Abra of Poitiers (aka Saint Abra) (c.343 – c.360), French saint
- Abra (rapper), stage name of Filipino rapper Raymond Abracosa (born 1990)
- Abra (singer), Atlanta-based R&B musician

=== Surname ===
- Douglas Abra (born 1947), judge of Manitoba, Canada
- Fernanda Abra (PhD 2019), Brazilian ecologist

=== Given name ===
- Abra Amedomé, Togolese politician
- Abra Lee (born 1978), American public horticulturalist, historian and writer
- Abra K. Maynard (1803–1894), American farmer and politician
- Abra Moore (born 1969), Irish-American singer-songwriter
- Abra J. Powers (1883–1971), American lawyer and politician
- Abra Prentice Wilkin (born 1942), American philanthropist, socialite and member of the Rockefeller Family

== Fictional characters ==
- Abra Durant, a fictional surgeon in the British television series Holby City
- Abra Kadabra (character), a DC comic book supervillain
- Abra Bacon, young woman in John Steinbeck's novel East of Eden
- Abra Stone, a girl in Stephen King's novel Doctor Sleep
- Abra Walsh, a young woman in Nora Roberts's novel Whiskey Beach
- Abra, the name of a Pokémon
- Abra, the maid of Judith
