= Erskine, Minnesota =

City in Minnesota, United States

- City
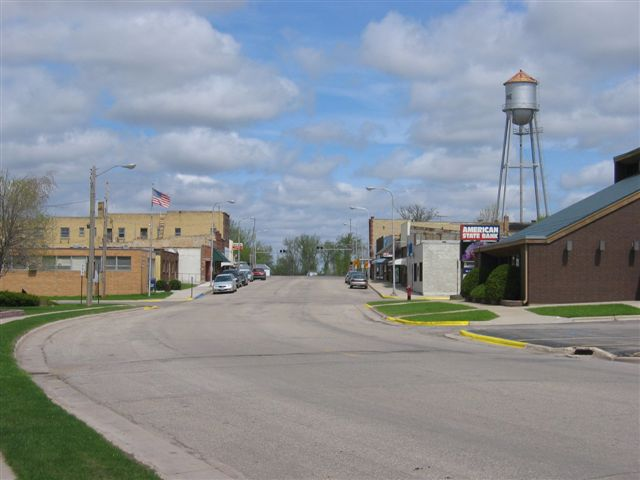
- Downtown Erskine in 2007

- Location of Erskine, Minnesota
- Coordinates: 47°39′45″N 96°00′12″W
- Country: United States
- State: Minnesota
- County: Polk
- Founded: 1889
- Incorporated: March 8, 1897

Government
  - Mayor: Marc Plante

Area
  - Total: 0.968 sq mi (2.507 km^{2})
  - Land: 0.645 sq mi (1.671 km^{2})
  - Water: 0.323 sq mi (0.836 km^{2})
- Elevation: 1,184 ft (361 m)

Population (2020)
  - Total: 403
  - Estimate (2022): 393
  - Density: 625/sq mi (241.2/km^{2})
- Time zone: UTC−6 (Central (CST))
  - Summer (DST): UTC−5 (CDT)
- ZIP Code: 56535
- Area code: 218
- FIPS code: 27-19700
- GNIS feature ID: 2394699
- Sales tax: 7.375%
- Website: erkinemn.org

Erskine is a city in Polk County, Minnesota. The population was 403 at the time of the 2020 census. It is part of the Greater Grand Forks region.

== History ==
Erskine was laid out in 1889, and named for George Quincy Erskine, a Minnesota banker. A post office has been in operation at Erskine since 1889.

== Geography ==
According to the United States Census Bureau, the city has an area of 0.968 square miles (2.51 km^{2}), of which 0.645 square miles (1.67 km^{2}) is land and 0.323 square miles (0.84 km^{2}) is water.

== Demographics ==
Historical population
Census	Pop.	Note	%±
1900	156		—
1910	324		107.7%
1920	457		41.0%
1930	511		11.8%
1940	581		13.7%
1950	608		4.6%
1960	614		1.0%
1970	571		−7.0%
1980	585		2.5%
1990	424		−27.5%
2000	437		3.1%
2010	503		15.1%
2020	403		−19.9%
2022 (est.)	393		−2.5%
U.S. Decennial Census; 2020 Census

The population of Erskine was more than 800 in the 1920s. It hovered above 600 until the late 1960s, dipped to 571 (1970) and 585 (1980), and then plunged to 424 (1990), 428 (1995), and 437 (2000).

=== 2010 census ===
As of the 2010 census, there were 503 people, 234 households, and 131 families residing in the city. The population density was 739.7 inhabitants per square mile (285.6/km^{2}). There were 273 housing units at an average density of 401.5 per square mile (155.0/km^{2}). The racial makeup of the city was 94.8% White, 0.4% African American, 2.2% Native American, 0.2% Asian, and 2.4% from two or more races. Hispanic or Latino of any race were 2.0% of the population.

There were 234 households, of which 27.4% had children under the age of 18 living with them, 37.6% were married couples living together, 11.1% had a female householder with no husband present, 7.3% had a male householder with no wife present, and 44.0% were non-families. 41.0% of all households were made up of individuals, and 24% had someone living alone who was 65 years of age or older. The average household size was 2.15 and the average family size was 2.88.

The median age in the city was 38 years. 25.4% of residents were under the age of 18; 9.5% were between the ages of 18 and 24; 23.4% were from 25 to 44; 18.2% were from 45 to 64; and 23.9% were 65 years of age or older. The gender makeup of the city was 49.9% male and 50.1% female.

=== 2000 census ===
As of the 2000 census, there were 437 people, 203 households, and 111 families residing in the city. The population density was 590.0 inhabitants per square mile (227.8/km^{2}). There were 250 housing units, with an average density of 337.5 per square mile (130.3/km^{2}). The racial makeup of the city was 91.99% White, 0.23% African American, 5.49% Native American, and 2.29% from two or more races. Hispanic or Latino of any race were 0.23% of the population. The ethnicity of Erskine residents was as follows: · Norwegian – 48% · German – 13% · Swedish – 12% · Chippewa – 4% · American Indian tribes, specified – 4% · Irish – 4% · Russian – 3% · Danish – 3% · French (except Basque) – 2% · Scottish – 2% · American Indian tribes, not specified – 2% · Italian – 1% · English – 1% · Scandinavian – 1%

Of the 203 households, 25.6% had children under the age of 18 living with them, 40.9% were married couples living together, 10.3% had a female householder with no husband present, and 45.3% were non-families. 42.4% of all households were made up of individuals, and 25.6% had someone living alone who was 65 years of age or older. The average household size was 2.15 and the average family size was 2.95.

In the city, the population was spread out, with 25.6% under the age of 18, 6.6% from 18 to 24, 20.4% from 25 to 44, 21.3% from 45 to 64, and 26.1% who were 65 years of age or older. The median age was 43 years. For every 100 females, there were 84.4 males. For every 100 females aged 18 and over, there were 77.6 males.

The median income for a household in the city was $26,771, and the median income for a family was $35,278. Males had a median income of $33,333 versus $19,375 for females. The per capita income for the city was $18,122. About 17.3% of families and 18.1% of the population were below the poverty line, including 37.8% of those under age 18 and 7.3% of those age 65 or over.

== Culture ==
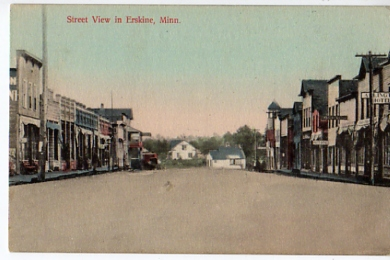
Downtown Erskine, c. 1910

Erskine's town festival is known as the Erskine Water Carnival and held in early June. The Erskine Fish, the concrete statue that is the world's largest northern pike and the town's principal tourist attraction, is on a lawn in a small park on the shore of Cameron Lake, just down the street from downtown Erskine. In addition, it is the center of a community of Russian Old Believers estimated at between 50 and 100 families. The Old Believers began moving to Erskine around 1998 to escape a farming crisis and suburban sprawl that threatened their community near Woodburn, Oregon.

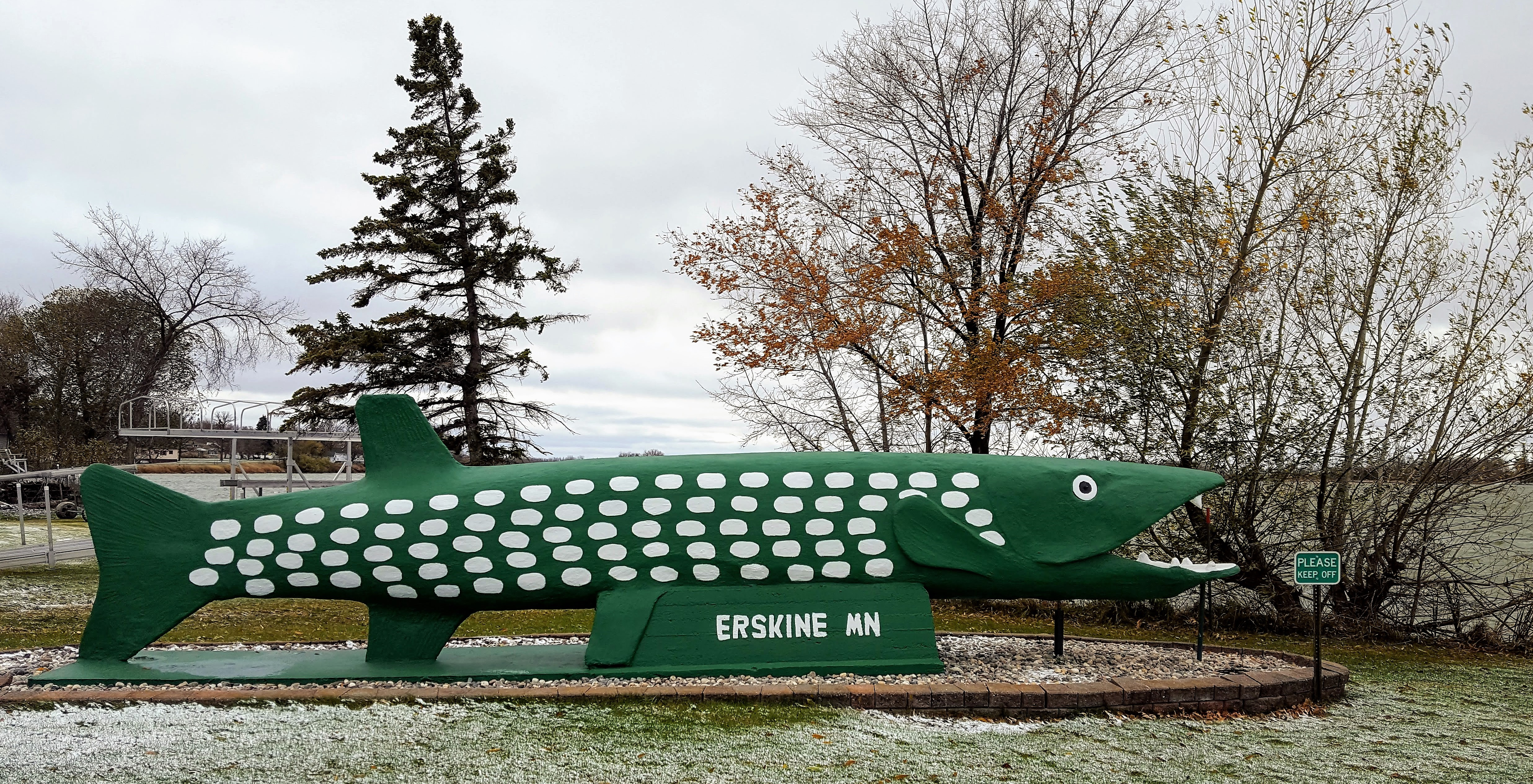
The world's largest northern pike

== Parks, recreation and public facilities ==
The Rydell National Wildlife Refuge is along County Road 238 about 3 miles (4.8 km) west of Erskine and 2 1/2 miles south of U.S. Highway 2. The Oak Lake Golf Course is just east of town at the intersection of Highway 2 and U.S. Highway 59. The best local resort and fishing areas are Maple Lake, a lake near Mentor, and Maple Bay, as well as Union Lake and Lake Sarah, a few miles south of Erskine. Erskine's sewage was dumped into Cameron Lake until the Clean Water Act of 1970 forced the town to redirect its sewage to the new sewer plant near Badger Lake. Former residents and old-timers recall that the shores of Cameron Lake were littered with dead fish in the old days. Today the lake is much cleaner, and with the rising costs of lakeshore property in the area, there is an increase in development on the lakeshore.

== Schools ==
Erskine is served by a consolidated multi-community K–12 school district known as "Win-E-Mac" , which represents McIntosh and Winger in addition to Erskine. A vocational and technical college is in Thief River Falls. The nearest four-year colleges in the vicinity include a branch campus of the University of Minnesota in Crookston and Bemidji State University in Bemidji, in addition to the University of North Dakota in Grand Forks and North Dakota State University in Fargo.

== Media ==
=== Telephone and internet service ===
The oldest telephone cooperative in the state, Garden Valley Telephone Company, is headquartered in Erskine and serves most of northwestern Minnesota. It was formed to provide telephone coverage to the region at a time when it was difficult to get phone service to the area. Garden Valley Telephone Company now provides internet service, although other Internet service providers also serve the area. The Erskine telephone prefix is 687, formerly Murray 7, and the area code is 218.

=== Newspapers ===
Erskine is home to the Erskine Echo, a weekly newspaper that began publishing before 1900. Other weekly papers include the McIntosh Times and The 13 Towns (published in Fosston for the 13 townships of eastern Polk County). Area daily papers include the Crookston Times, Grand Forks Herald, The Forum, The Bemidji Pioneer, and the Star Tribune, available by subscription and in vendor boxes.

=== Radio and television ===
Erskine has no radio or television stations, but nearby Fosston is home to three radio stations. Radio and TV stations from Bemidji, Crookston, Thief River Falls, Grand Forks, Fargo, and Winnipeg can be picked up in Erskine.

== Transportation ==
=== Roads and highways ===
Erskine is just west of the intersection of U.S. Highway 59 and four-lane U.S. Highway 2, and about 60 miles (97 km) east of Interstate 29 at Grand Forks, North Dakota, and 105 miles (169 km) north of Interstate 94 at Fergus Falls.

=== Air transport ===
The nearest airports with commercial service are Bemidji (55 miles (89 km) east), Thief River Falls (35 miles (56 km) north) and Grand Forks (60 miles (97 km) west). An uninstrumented grass airfield known as the Erskine Airport was in operation from 1954 until the early 1970s, but no longer exists. Nearby Fosston (12 miles (19 km) east) and Crookston (20 miles (32 km) west) both have private aviation airfields.

=== Rail transport ===
At the historic junction of the Great Northern Railway and the Soo Line Railroad, Erskine used to appear prominently on many national railroad maps and atlases that omitted much larger cities and towns in the vicinity. Both lines are still in place today, with the Great Northern tracks now owned by the BNSF Railway and the Soo Line tracks by the Canadian Pacific Railway. Erskine's freight depot, while still standing, is closed for business, and rail passenger service was discontinued many years ago.

=== Bus services ===
Greyhound Bus Lines no longer serves Erskine, but Jefferson Lines has taken over the Fargo-Minneapolis route it served. The Tri-Valley Heartland Express Bus provides scheduled weekly or biweekly service to Crookston, Bemidji, Thief River Falls and other destinations for seniors and others on an advance reservation basis.

== Business and manufacturing ==
=== Historic businesses ===
Until 1980, Erskine was mostly a service community for the local agricultural community. In the early 1900s, the town had four grain elevators, an ice plant, a lumber mill and several blacksmith shops. Even as late as 1980, the town businesses included a grain elevator, a creamery, a lumber yard, a fuel delivery service, and several farm implement dealers, junkyards and repair shops. As family farming in the area declined, the agricultural services component has diminished as larger growers took their supply and services business to larger communities.

=== Erskine Attachments ===
Erskine was once the home of Erskine Attachments, formerly known as Erskine Manufacturing Company, established in 1948. The company began as a manufacturer of heavy equipment snowblowers and grain hitch elevators before changing its name to Erskine Attachments when it began manufacturing a line of Skid Steer Attachments for the Ingersoll Rand Bobcat company. Now private, Erskine Attachments manufactures more than 40 skid steer attachments including brush mowers, snowblowers, blades, buckets, grapples, post drivers, stump grinders, tree shears, and others that fit all skid steers and some front-end loaders that utilize the skid steer style quick attach mechanism. Erskine Attachments was used as a pilot for the Minnesota JOBZ incentive program to revitalize Minnesota's manufacturing opportunities and has been referenced for its continuance as a viable success story. Erskine Attachments is now just outside of Fosston.

=== Other businesses ===
Other significant employers include Garden Valley Telephone Company and the Pioneer Memorial Care Center, a nursing home and retirement community. In 2008, Crookston-based Agassiz Energy, LLC, announced that it had indefinitely postponed its plans for a $58.5 million ethanol plant at the junction of the former Great Northern and Soo Line railroads, near the interchange of U.S. Routes 59 and 2.

== Notable people ==
- Hector A. Hanson, Minnesota state legislator
- Roger Moe, Minnesota state legislator
- Jan Narveson, professor of philosophy
