= Cameron Lake =

Cameron Lake may refer to one of the following lakes:

- Canada
  - Cameron Lake (Alberta), an international lake
  - Cameron Lake (British Columbia)
  - Cameron Lake (Ontario)
- New Zealand
  - Lake Cameron (Waikato) / Lake Kareaotahi
  - Lake Cameron statistical area
- Antarctica
  - Lake Cameron (Antarctica)
- United States
  - Cameron Lake (Polk County, Minnesota)
