= Collateralization =

Process in medical pathology

In medicine, collateralization, also vessel collateralization and blood vessel collateralization, is the growth of a blood vessel or several blood vessels that serve the same end organ or vascular bed as another blood vessel that cannot adequately supply that end organ or vascular bed sufficiently.

Coronary collateralization is considered a normal response to hypoxia and may be induced, under some circumstances, by exercise. It is considered to be protective.

Collateral or anastomotic blood vessels also exist even when blood supply is adequate to an area, and these blood vessels are often taken advantage of in surgery. Some notable areas where this occurs include the abdomen, rectum, knee, shoulder, and head.

== Coronary collateralization ==
Coronary collateralization exists latently in the normal heart. Microscopic collateral vessels of the heart undergo a process called transformation that widens the vessel lumen at the expense of its cell wall in response to myocardial stresses—specifically, myocardial spasm and hypoxia secondary to myocardial infarction or acutely stressful exercise. The status of the coronary collaterals has also been shown to be influenced by the presence of diabetes mellitus.

The functional significance of the coronary collateral vessels is a matter of continuing experimental investigation although their existence has been known for over three centuries and been documented repeatedly in man and beast over the past seven decades. Although a now-classic series of experiments by Schaper in the late 1960s and '70s expanded our understanding of the mechanisms by which these usually redundant, microscopic (40-10 um in diameter in their native state) ur-arterioles are transformed by ischemia or stenosis into vessels with life-preserving blood capacity, equally as many studies have denied the function of these vessels to preserve myocardium by salvaging tissue perfusion and maintaining blood pressure as have documented this. It was only during the 1980s that a consensus among researchers was reached that these vessels can preserve as much as 30 to 40% of coronary blood flow to an otherwise-occluded blood vessel, and, while not capable of preventing ischemia in the event of high-output exercise, can nevertheless maintain aortic, pulmonic, and atrial blood pressure, redirect ST elevation into less serious ST depression in ischemia, and prevent infarction and symptoms of infarction, even in the case of complete left main coronary artery stenosis.

The native collaterals are small vessels, with a narrow endothelial lining, a layer or two of smooth muscle, and a variable amount of elastic tissue. They are rarely if ever observed during angiography in the absence of severe ischemia (vessels less than 200 micrometers are not visible, generally), and only coronary stenosis, anemia, and exercise have experimentally been shown to cause transformation. Most observers agree that a 90% occlusion is necessary to bring about transformation in the absence of other factors, though a recent article suggests that they may appear as a result of coronary spasm in the absence of total occlusion (see below). Within ninety seconds of occlusion, the pressure gradient between the segment of the coronary vessel distal to the occlusion and the incipient collateral vessel precipitates damage to the internal elastic lamina, provoking an inflammatory response; monocytes and polycytes migrate to the vascular wall, which has, as a result of the occlusion, become permeable to the blood's cellular components. The internal diameter of these vessels expands exponentially in the first hours and days following an occlusion, as mitotic division of the cell wall narrows the wall's diameter and expands each vessel's lumen.Within four weeks, the functional capacity of the vessels has reached a maximum, accompanied by a 90% reduction in their resistance, though structural remodeling continues by cell proliferation and synthesis of elastin and collagen over a period of up to six months.

Schaper summarizes the status-2009 knowledge of coronary collateral transformation in a recent review: "Following an arterial occlusion outward remodeling of pre-existent inter-connecting arterioles occurs by proliferation of vascular smooth muscle and endothelial cells. This is initiated by deformation of the endothelial cells through increased pulsatile fluid shear stress (FSS) caused by the steep pressure gradient between the high pre-occlusive and the very low post-occlusive pressure regions that are interconnected by collateral vessels. Shear stress leads to the activation and expression of all nitric oxide synthetase (NOS) isoforms and nitric oxide production, followed by vascular endothelial growth factor (VEGF) secretion, which induces monocyte chemoattractant protein-1 (MCP-1) synthesis in the endothelium and in the smooth muscle of the media. This leads to attraction and activation of monocytes and T-cells into the adventitial space (peripheral collateral vessels) or attachment of these cells to the endothelium (coronary collaterals). Mononuclear cells produce proteases and growth factors to digest the extra-cellular scaffold and allow motility and provide space for the new cells. They also produce NO from inducible nitric oxide synthetase (iNOS), which is essential for arteriogenesis. The bulk of new tissue production is carried by the smooth muscles of the media, which transform their phenotype from a contractile into a synthetic and proliferative one. Important roles are played by actin binding proteins like actin-binding Rho-activating protein (ABRA), cofilin, and thymosin beta 4 which determine actin polymerization and maturation. Integrins and connexins are markedly up-regulated. A key role in this concerted action, which leads to a 2-to-20 fold increase in vascular diameter, depending on species size (mouse versus human), are the transcription factors AP-1, egr-1, carp, ets, by the Rho pathway and by the mitogen activated kinases ERK-1 and -2. In spite of the enormous increase in tissue mass (up to 50-fold), the degree of functional restoration of blood flow capacity is incomplete and ends at 30% of maximal coronary conductance and 40% in the vascular periphery. The process of arteriogenesis can be drastically stimulated by increases in FSS (arterio-venous fistulas) and can be completely blocked by inhibition of NO production, by pharmacological blockade of VEGF-A, and by the inhibition of the Rho-pathway. Pharmacological stimulation of arteriogenesis, important for the treatment of arterial occlusive diseases, seems feasible with NO donors."

Kolibash's 1982 study of the effect of collaterals on rest and stress myocardial perfusion, left ventricular function, and myocardial infarction prevention was most influential in turning the tide of professional opinion toward acknowledging the impact of these vessels on the jeopardized heart. In 91 patients examined by angiography, 90% of which had exertional angina, Kolibash discovered 110 occluded LAD and RCA vessels, 101 of which showed evidence of collateral vessels in their proximal areas. Kolibash divided these 101 proximal areas into two groups: those with normal perfusion at rest (43) and those with abnormal perfusion at rest (58). Wall motion abnormalities were significantly less evident in areas with normal rest perfusion—only 35% of these areas showed decreased segment shortening. By comparison, 72% of areas with abnormal rest perfusion showed decreased segment shortening. Infarctions also occurred less often in the normals than in the abnormals (12% vs. 62%). Examining four variables—rest perfusion, stress perfusion, wall motion abnormalities, and EKG evidence of MI, Kolibash found that 86% of the variables were normal in the normal perfusion group and 81% of the variables were abnormal in the abnormal perfusion group. Neither the extent of coronary disease nor the appearance of the collateral vessels during angiography differed between the two groups, leading Kolibash to conclude that angiography is inadequate in and of itself to evaluate the functional significance of collateral vessels, and that "several physiologic variables" are most likely responsible for myocardial status in any given clinical situation. That so many adequately collateralized areas showed no evidence of subsequent improvement in myocardial perfusion also provided evidence that collaterals may often be of little or no significance. However, it is possible that such collaterals appeared too late after infarction to significantly improve overall perfusion.

Since Kolibash's study, newer techniques have been used effectively to investigate the issues he raised and to characterize both the mechanism of the transformation of the native collaterals and assess their impact on myocardial perfusion and function—among them percutaneous transluminal coronary angioplasty (PTCA), ergovine-provocative spasm tests, and myocardial perfusion studies. Using PTCA, Rentrop demonstrated that collateral vessel filling jumps dramatically during coronary occlusion by balloon inflation—within ninety seconds of total occlusion. Filling improved in 15 of 16 patients; neither chest pain nor pre-inflation angina correlated with the extent of collateral filling, and coronary spasm did not occur. Rentrop did not generalize about the functional significance of these collaterals, which he said was "unknown," but their existence suggests that they may exert a preemptive, protective effect.

Subsequently, Rentrop's associate Cohen prospectively evaluated 23 patients undergoing PTCA and observed that during balloon inflation, the mean grade of collateral filling increased dramatically. Nineteen of 23 patients showed improvement (p=0.01) but post-PTCA arteriography revealed no visible collaterals in any patient. The functional effect of filling was dramatic: using an index of ischemia (based on the percent of hypocontractile perimeter of myocardium, sum of ST segment elevation, and time of onset of angina), Cohen found that grade 0 or 1 filling confers only nominal protection from ischemia (i.e., filling is non-existent or of side branches only), but partial filling (i.e. grade 2 or greater) of these segments provides almost complete preservation of the affected myocardium from the asynergy associated with critical coronary stenosis. Pain was observed in all nine patients with 0 or 1 filling, but in only five of 14 patients with grade 2 or 3 filling. Thus, the severity of symptoms correlated inversely with the degree of observed collateral filling.

In another often-cited study, Freedman focused on the issue of MI prevention by selecting 121 patients with severe single vessel disease. 64 had Q-wave infarction and 57 did not; 32 had unstable angina or subendocardial infarction. 74 totally occluded vessels and 47 subtotally occluded vessels were identified in this study, and the presence of total occlusion was the most significant predictor of the existence of collaterals. 63 of 74 (85%) of the "totalled" vessels were accompanied by evidence of collaterals, compared to 8 of 47 (17%) of the subtotalled vessels (p=0.001). Collaterals were completely absent beside arteries with less than 90% stenosis. Totally occluded arteries were found in 29 of 57 patients in the group without Q-wave myocardial infarctions, and all 29 showed collaterals. In comparison, 76% of those who lacked totally occluded arteries showed collaterals (p is less than 0.005). In contrast, all 24 of those 57 patients without Q-wave MI's who did not have collaterals had subtotal stenosis of their diseased vessel. Though smoking, cholesterol levels, and the presence of angina did not differ between the groups, the presence of subendocardial infarction was significantly greater in those with collaterals, suggesting either that subendocardial infarction precipitates the formation of collaterals to an extent comparable to Q-wave infarcts, or that preexisting collaterals prevent subendocardial infarctions from becoming transmural infarctions.

Among several Japanese studies utilizing the ergovine-provocative spasm test to simulate ischemia in man and beast, including those of Takeshita and Tada, one by Yamagishi found that spasm in the LAD resulted in (1) ST segment elevation more commonly in those without collaterals than in those with them (8 of 9 vs. 2 of 7; p=0.05); (2) greater increases in pulmonary artery end diastolic pressure in those without collaterals (p=0.05); and (3) great cardiac vein flow that was significantly greater in those with collaterals than in those without them. Spasm resulted in mild angina associated with slight elevation of pulmonary artery end diastolic pressure and ST depression when collaterals were present rather than elevation and lower cardiac lactate production, suggesting strongly that collaterals do salvage myocardium when ischemia is produced by spasm.

Whether angina causes collateral development is still debatable, but at least one investigator, Fujita, believes that angina is either symptomatic of, or somehow promotes the development of, collateral circulation, and, in any case, sometimes precedes, and often prevents, infarction by relieving the critically occluded vessel before thrombosis can occur. Examining 37 patients who underwent intercoronary thrombolysis within six hours of MI, Fujita found that 2 of 19 patients without preinfarct angina had collaterals and 9 of 18 patients with angina had them. No other variables pertaining to collateral development distinguished the groups. Fujita therefore suggests that the absence of symptomatic angina may not always portend favorable developments, and infarct prevention must surely be targeted to those with coronary disease who are without symptoms, as they may be without the protective effects of collateral development provoked by the presence of angina.

== Relation to angiogenesis ==
Collateralization differs from angiogenesis in that several blood vessels supply one vascular bed and these vessels are maintained (one does not involute/regress).

== See also ==
- Angiogenesis
- Atherosclerosis
- Axonal collateralization and its dependence on dendritic arborization
