= Maple Bay =

Maple Bay may refer to:

- Maple Bay, British Columbia, Canada
- Maple Bay, Minnesota, United States
