= Jobanputra =

Jobanputra is a surname. Notable people with the surname include:

- Jalak Jobanputra (fl. 1999), American businesswoman
- Shabs Jobanputra (born 1967), British music businessman
