= Lohi =

Lohi may refer to:

- Lohi, Pakistan, a town in Balochistan, Pakistan
- Lohi sheep, a sheep breed

== People with the surname ==
- Eero Lohi (1927–2023), Finnish modern pentathlete
- Kalle Lohi (1872–1948), Finnish farmer, lay preacher and politician
- Markus Lohi, (born 1972), Finnish politician
