= Mahnomen, Minnesota =

City in Minnesota, United States

Mahnomen, Minnesota Manoomining (Ojibwe)
- City
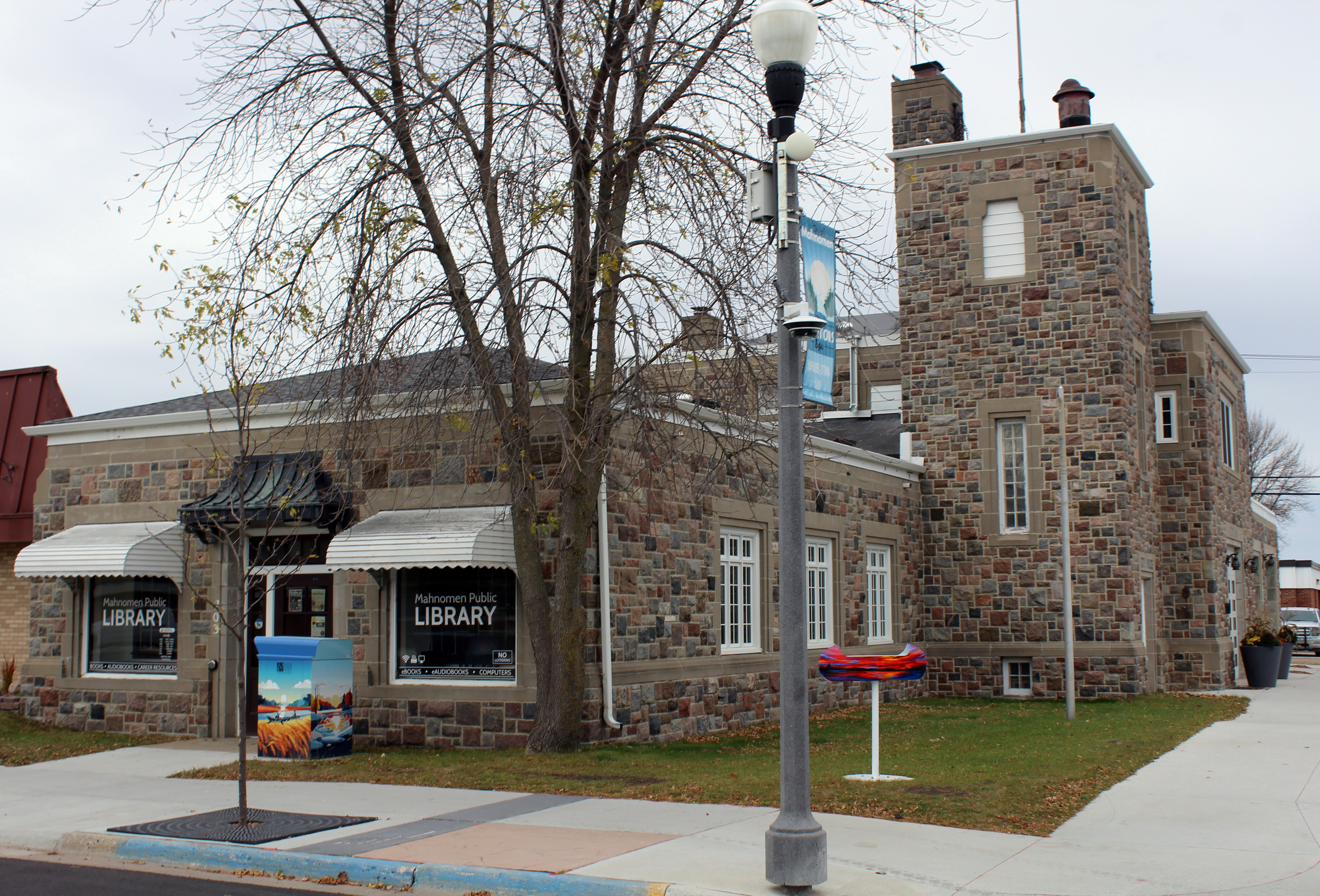
- Mahnomen City Hall and Library

- Location within Mahnomen County and the state of Minnesota
- Coordinates: 47°18′53″N 95°58′03″W
- Country: United States
- State: Minnesota
- County: Mahnomen

Government
  - Mayor: Martin Warnsholz

Area
  - Total: 1.05 sq mi (2.71 km^{2})
  - Land: 1.05 sq mi (2.71 km^{2})
  - Water: 0 sq mi (0.00 km^{2})
- Elevation: 1,211 ft (369 m)

Population (2020)
  - Total: 1,240
  - Density: 1,184.2/sq mi (457.21/km^{2})
- Time zone: UTC-6 (Central (CST))
  - Summer (DST): UTC-5 (CDT)
- ZIP code: 56557
- Area code: 218
- FIPS code: 27-39392
- GNIS feature ID: 2395817
- Website: www.mahnomenmn.org

Mahnomen (/məˈnoʊmən/ mə-NOH-mən, Ojibwe: Manoomining) is a city in Mahnomen County, Minnesota, United States, along the Wild Rice River. The population was 1,240 at the 2020 census. It is the seat of Mahnomen County.

U.S. Highway 59 and Minnesota State Highway 200 are two of the main routes in Mahnomen.

== History ==
The name "Mahnomen" comes from manoomin, the Ojibwe word for wild rice.

A post office called Mahnomen has been in operation since 1904. Mahnomen City Hall is listed on the National Register of Historic Places.

== Education ==
The city is served by Mahnomen ISD 432.

== Geography ==
Mahnomen is in the western part of its county, along U.S. Route 59, which leads north 25 miles (40 km) to Erskine and south 36 miles (58 km) to Detroit Lakes. State Highway 200 passes just north of the city limits, leading west 28 miles (45 km) to Ada and east 77 miles (124 km) to Walker. According to the U.S. Census Bureau, Mahnomen has an area of 1.05 square miles (2.72 km^{2}), all of it land. The Wild Rice River passes through the southernmost part of the city, flowing west to join the Red River north of Hendrum.

Mahnomen is in the western part of the White Earth Indian Reservation, which includes all of Mahnomen County and parts of neighboring counties to the east and south.

=== Climate ===
Climate data for Mahnomen, Minnesota (1991–2020 normals, extremes 1927–present)
Month	Jan	Feb	Mar	Apr	May	Jun	Jul	Aug	Sep	Oct	Nov	Dec	Year
Record high °F (°C)	51 (11)	52 (11)	79 (26)	96 (36)	93 (34)	100 (38)	110 (43)	103 (39)	98 (37)	89 (32)	72 (22)	56 (13)	108 (42)
Mean maximum °F (°C)	35.4 (1.9)	37.6 (3.1)	51.2 (10.7)	72.4 (22.4)	80.6 (27.0)	85.8 (29.9)	90.5 (32.5)	91.3 (32.9)	75.6 (24.2)	71.1 (21.7)	55.7 (13.2)	41.2 (5.1)	91.3 (32.9)
Mean daily maximum °F (°C)	16.8 (−8.4)	21.3 (−5.9)	34.4 (1.3)	51.9 (11.1)	66.0 (18.9)	74.2 (23.4)	78.5 (25.8)	78.1 (25.6)	69.2 (20.7)	53.5 (11.9)	34.1 (1.2)	21.5 (−5.8)	49.8 (9.9)
Daily mean °F (°C)	6.8 (−14.0)	11.4 (−11.4)	24.8 (−4.0)	40.9 (4.9)	54.6 (12.6)	63.8 (17.7)	68.1 (20.1)	66.5 (19.2)	57.9 (14.4)	43.9 (6.6)	26.8 (−2.9)	13.6 (−10.2)	39.9 (4.4)
Mean daily minimum °F (°C)	−2.5 (−19.2)	1.5 (−16.9)	15.2 (−9.3)	29.9 (−1.2)	43.3 (6.3)	53.5 (11.9)	57.6 (14.2)	55.0 (12.8)	46.6 (8.1)	34.4 (1.3)	19.5 (−6.9)	5.6 (−14.7)	30.0 (−1.1)
Mean minimum °F (°C)	−27.9 (−33.3)	−24.6 (−31.4)	−13.4 (−25.2)	15.4 (−9.2)	29.2 (−1.6)	41.6 (5.3)	45.0 (7.2)	42.5 (5.8)	30.8 (−0.7)	18.6 (−7.4)	−6.2 (−21.2)	−17.1 (−27.3)	−27.9 (−33.3)
Record low °F (°C)	−44 (−42)	−45 (−43)	−35 (−37)	−10 (−23)	10 (−12)	26 (−3)	36 (2)	27 (−3)	13 (−11)	−6 (−21)	−24 (−31)	−53 (−47)	−53 (−47)
Average precipitation inches (mm)	0.79 (20)	0.73 (19)	1.08 (27)	1.71 (43)	3.15 (80)	4.72 (120)	3.76 (96)	3.44 (87)	2.76 (70)	2.26 (57)	0.96 (24)	1.05 (27)	26.41 (671)
Source: NOAA

== Demographics ==
Historical population
Census	Pop.	Note	%±
1910	796		—
1920	1,076		35.2%
1930	989		−8.1%
1940	1,429		44.5%
1950	1,464		2.4%
1960	1,462		−0.1%
1970	1,313		−10.2%
1980	1,283		−2.3%
1990	1,154		−10.1%
2000	1,202		4.2%
2010	1,214		1.0%
2020	1,240		2.1%
U.S. Decennial Census

=== 2010 census ===
As of the census of 2010, there were 1,214 people, 529 households, and 293 families living in the city. The population density was 1,145.3 inhabitants per square mile (442.2/km^{2}). There were 582 housing units at an average density of 549.1 per square mile (212.0/km^{2}). The racial makeup of the city was 59.3% White, 0.2% African American, 31.2% Native American, 0.1% Asian, and 9.2% from two or more races. Hispanic or Latino of any race were 1.8% of the population.

There were 529 households, of which 24.8% had children under the age of 18 living with them, 32.3% were married couples living together, 14.7% had a female householder with no husband present, 8.3% had a male householder with no wife present, and 44.6% were non-families. 36.5% of all households were made up of individuals, and 16.5% had someone living alone who was 65 years of age or older. The average household size was 2.20 and the average family size was 2.81.

The median age in the city was 44.8 years. 22.4% of residents were under the age of 18; 6.8% were between the ages of 18 and 24; 21.1% were from 25 to 44; 28% were from 45 to 64; and 21.7% were 65 years of age or older. The gender makeup of the city was 49.3% male and 50.7% female.

=== 2000 census ===
As of the census of 2000, there were 1,202 people, 532 households, and 311 families living in the city. The population density was 1,252.9 inhabitants per square mile (483.7/km^{2}). There were 576 housing units at an average density of 600.4 per square mile (231.8/km^{2}). The racial makeup of the city was 74.29% White, 0.08% African American, 16.06% Native American, and 9.57% from two or more races. Hispanic or Latino of any race were 1.08% of the population.

There were 532 households, out of which 25.9% had children under the age of 18 living with them, 42.5% were married couples living together, 12.6% had a female householder with no husband present, and 41.4% were non-families. 37.4% of all households were made up of individuals, and 25.6% had someone living alone who was 65 years of age or older. The average household size was 2.16 and the average family size was 2.85.

In the city, the population was spread out, with 23.3% under the age of 18, 5.0% from 18 to 24, 21.9% from 25 to 44, 22.7% from 45 to 64, and 27.1% who were 65 years of age or older. The median age was 45 years. For every 100 females, there were 87.8 males. For every 100 females age 18 and over, there were 77.0 males.

The median income for a household in the city was $26,000, and the median income for a family was $37,500. Males had a median income of $24,479 versus $21,625 for females. The per capita income for the city was $14,538. About 9.8% of families and 14.0% of the population were below the poverty line, including 16.1% of those under age 18 and 19.5% of those age 65 or over.

== Notable people ==
- Abra J. Powers, Minnesota state legislator and lawyer
- Nicholas Spaeth, North Dakota Attorney General, born in Mahnomen

== Gallery ==
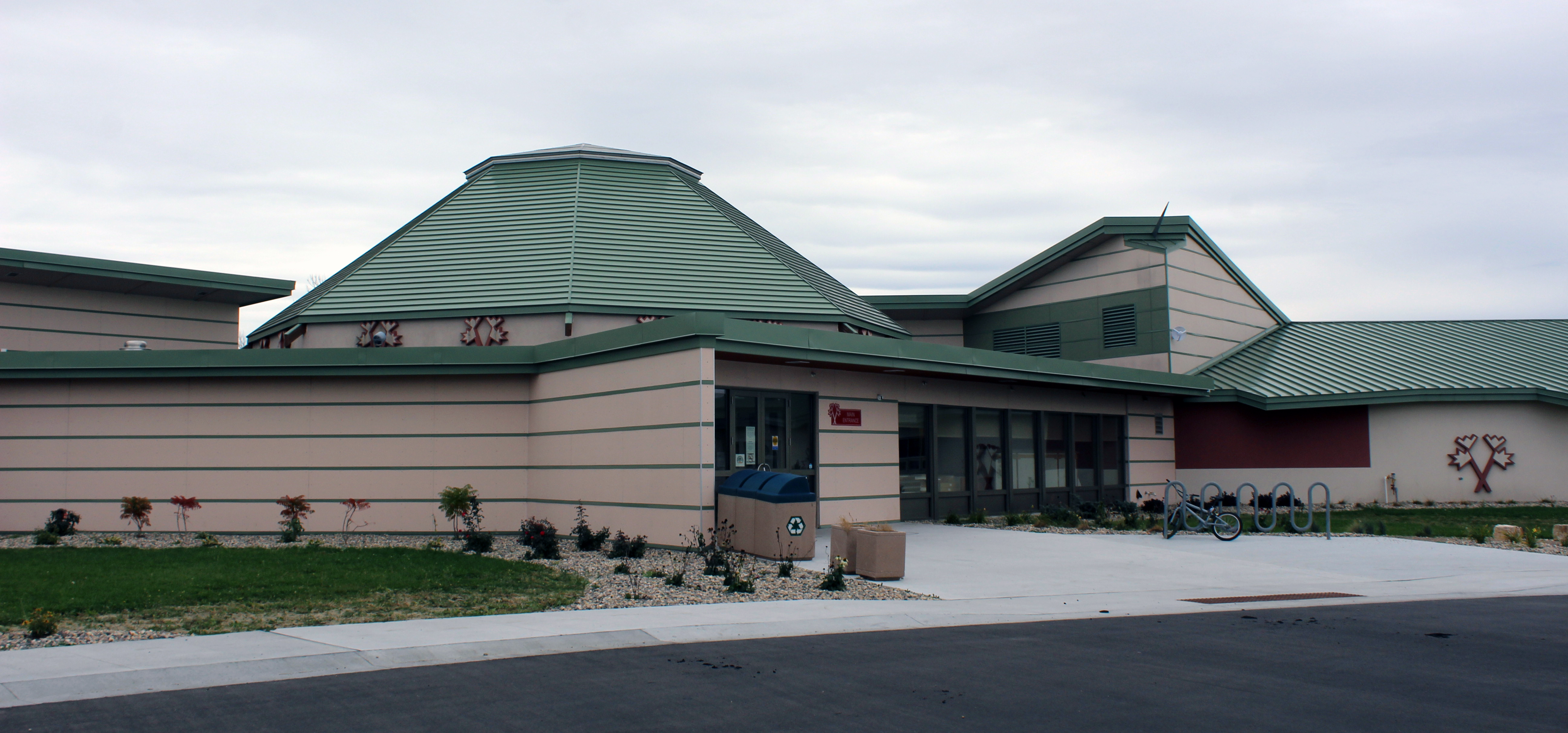
White Earth Tribal and Community College

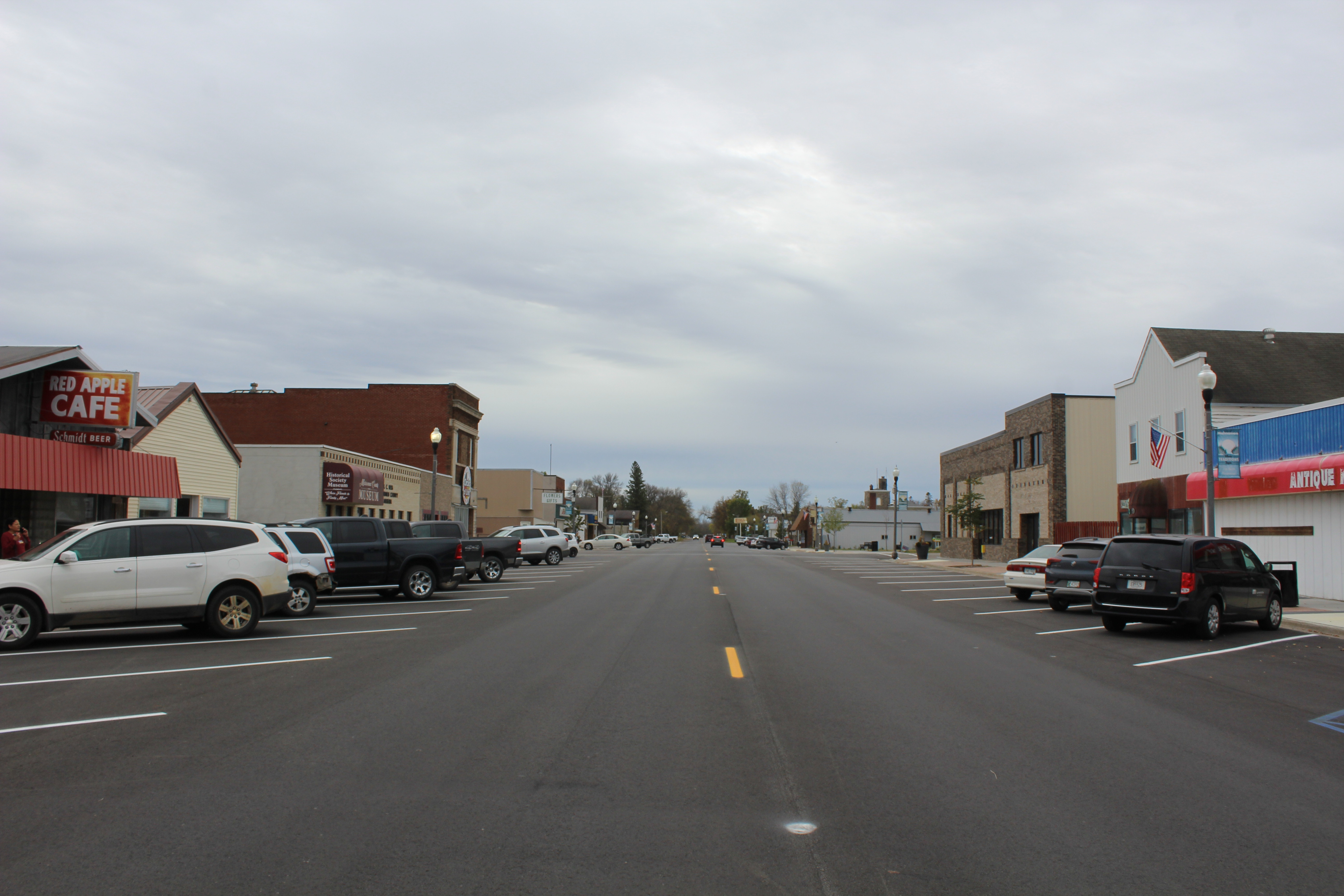
N. Main Street looking south from Adams Avenue

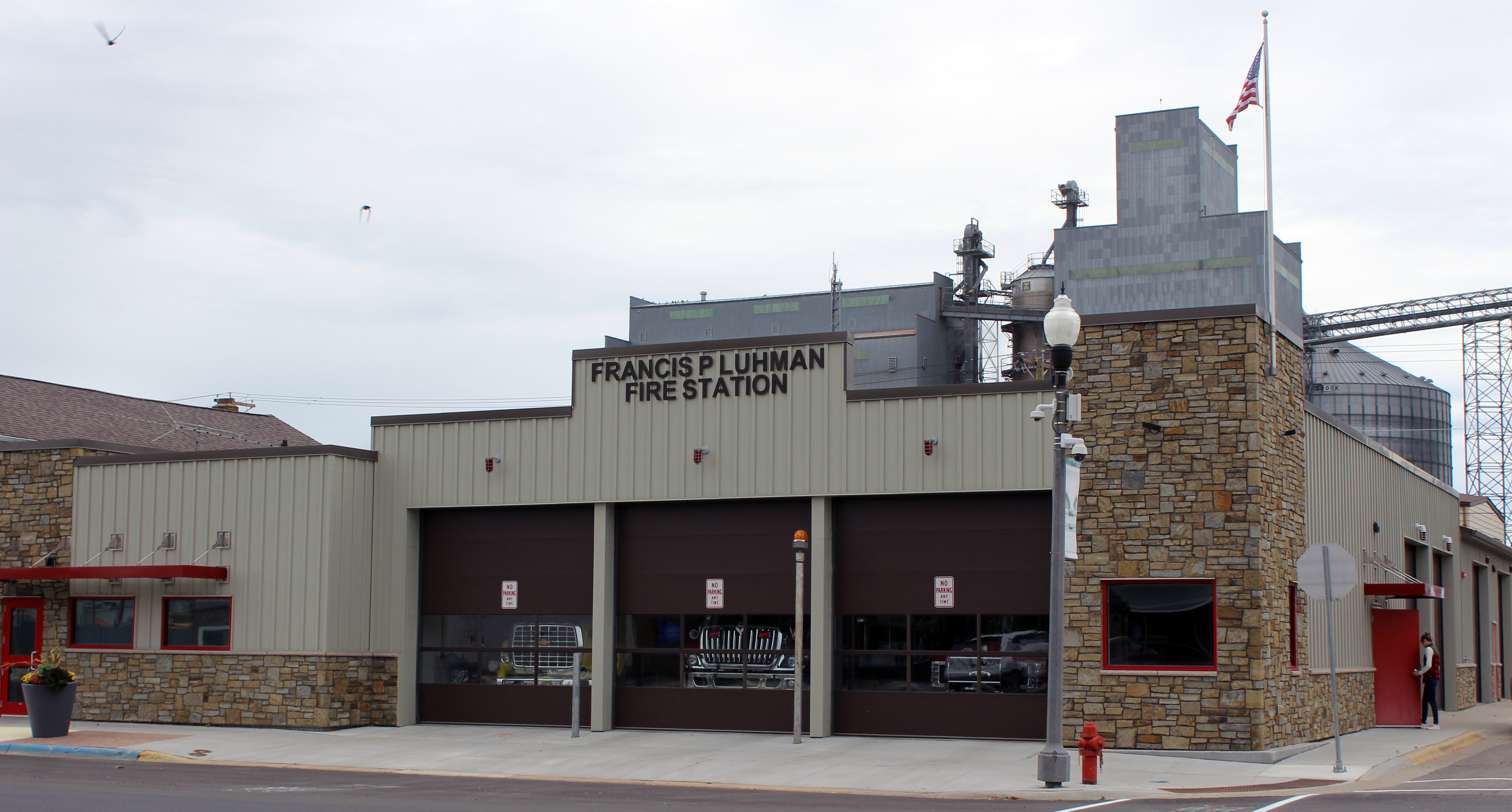
Fire Station

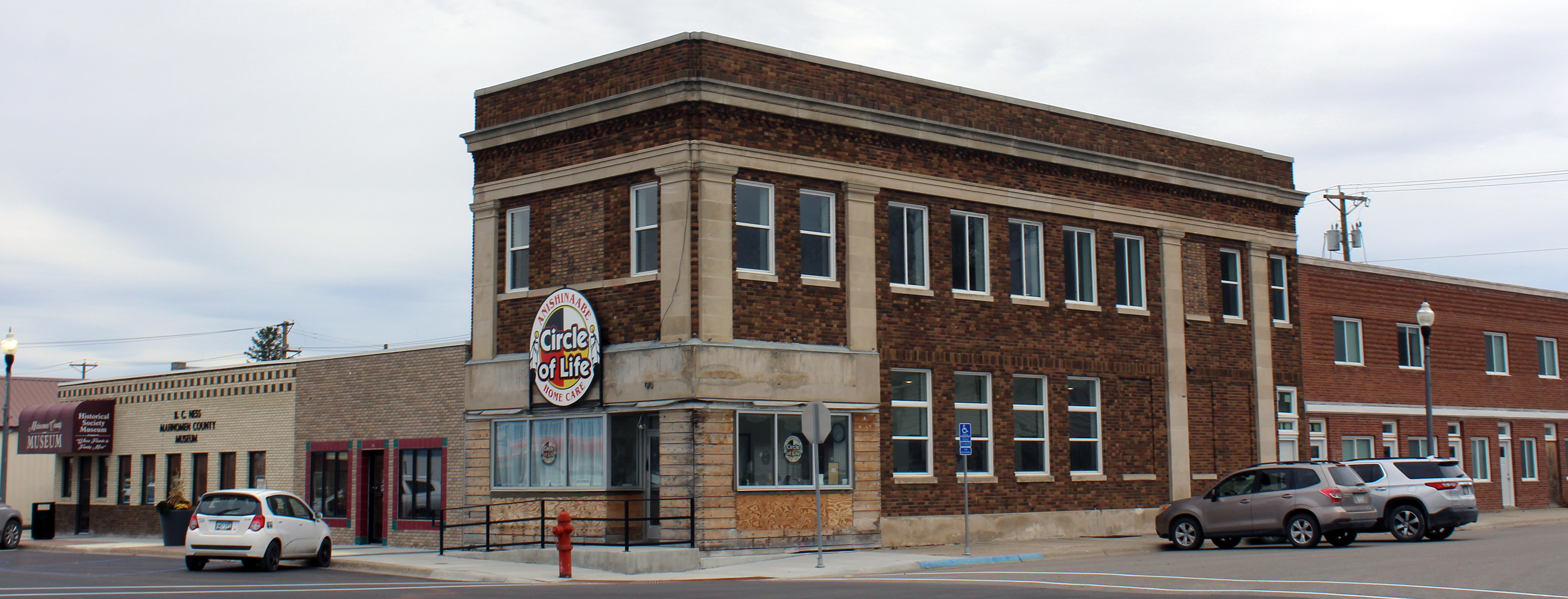
Northeast corner of Monroe Street and Washington Avenue

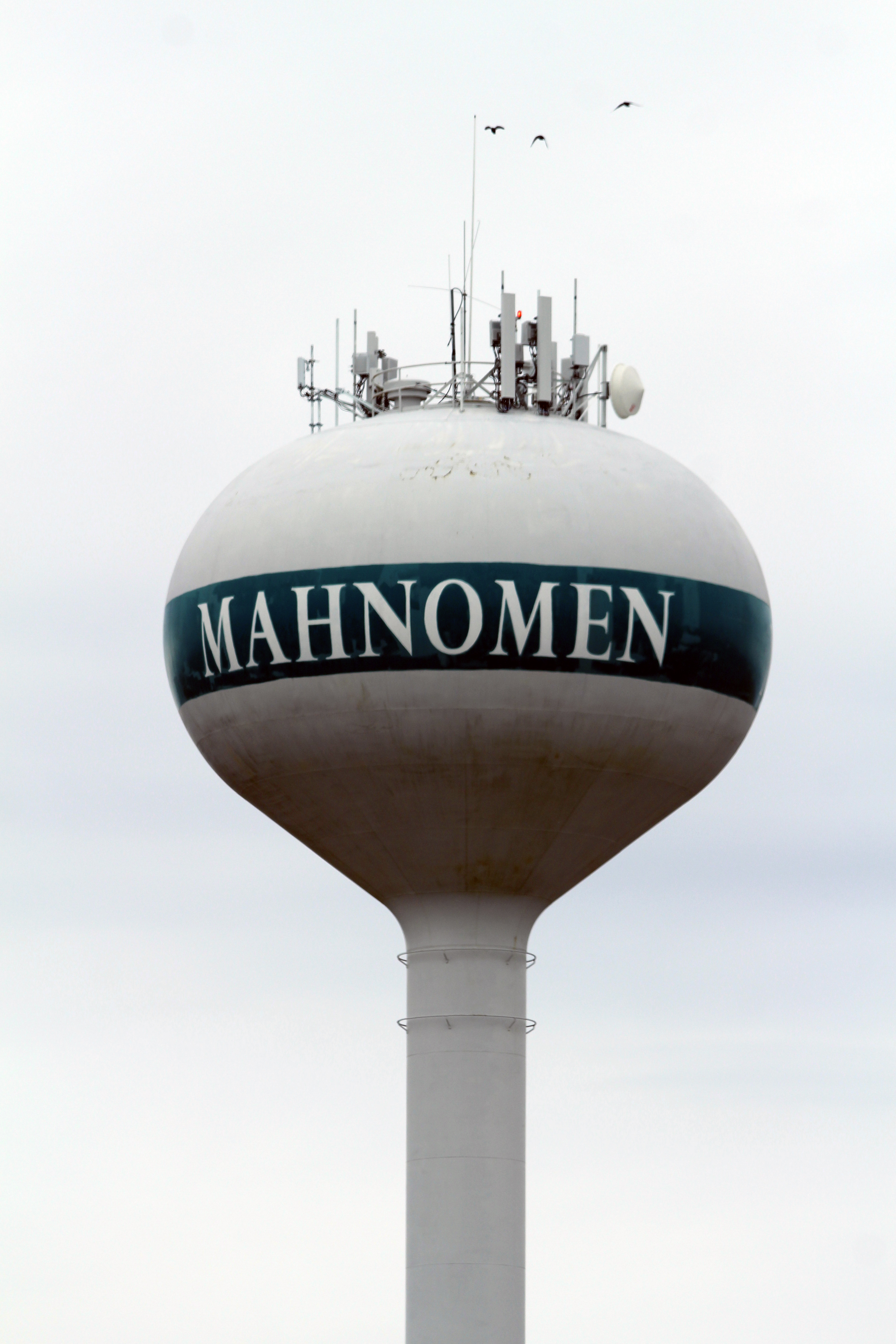
Water tower

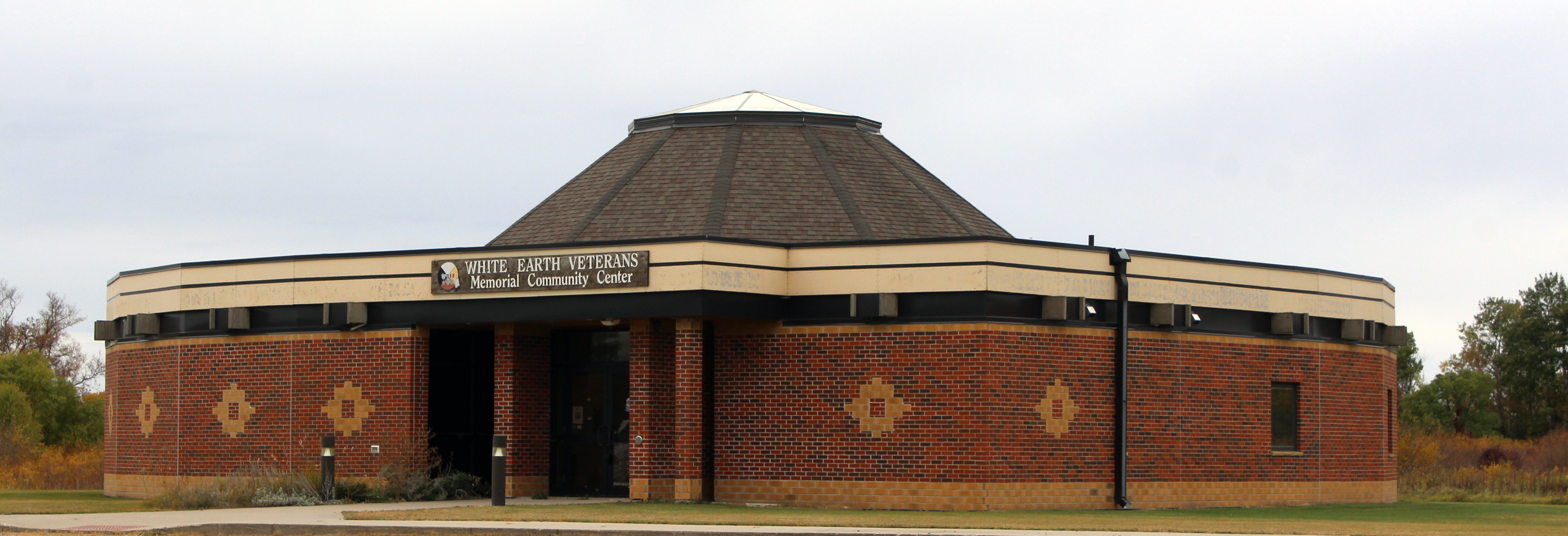
White Earth Veterans Memorial Community Center
