= Rydell National Wildlife Refuge =

National wildlife refuge in Minnesota, United States

- IUCN category IV (habitat/species management area)
- Location within the United States
- Location: Polk County, Minnesota, United States
- Nearest city: Erskine, Minnesota
- Coordinates: 47°39′24″N 96°06′30″W
- Area: 2,120 acres (8.6 km^{2})
- Established: 1992
- Governing body: U.S. Fish and Wildlife Service
- Website: Rydell National Wildlife Refuge

The Rydell National Wildlife Refuge is an 2,120-acre (9 km^{2}) National Wildlife Refuge in northwestern Minnesota, located in Woodside Township, Polk County, just west of Erskine in northwestern Minnesota. It was established in 1992, and receives more than 7,800 visitors each year. The refuge is a combination of maple/basswood/oak forest, wetlands, tallgrass prairie and bogs.

Wildlife comes first on national wildlife refuges; all human activities must be compatible with the needs of wildlife. Six activities are encouraged when appropriate: hunting, fishing, wildlife observation, photography, environmental education and interpretation.

The refuge visitor center provides information about refuge wildlife and serves as the starting point for the 7-mile (11 km), paved and gravel, trail system. Five trails are open to hiking, bicycling, snowshoeing, and crosscountry skiing. Observation blinds and gazebos on the trails offer opportunities to watch and photograph wildlife. Transportation for people with disabilities is available by prior arrangement.

Rydell’s diverse habitats support a variety of wildlife species. Waterfowl, including ducks, geese, and swans, rely on the wetlands and the surrounding grasslands and woodlands for feeding and nesting. Trumpeter swans, on Minnesota’s threatened species list, were re-introduced to the area prior to its becoming a refuge and now nest here each year. Bald eagles and osprey hunt on the refuge, and gray wolves are occasionally seen. Resident species include white-tailed deer, black bear, ruffed grouse, barred owl, pileated woodpecker, long-tailed weasel, red fox, river otter, and beaver.

Tours provided by the Friends of Rydell Refuge Association on electric golf carts are available by prior arrangement. Rydell NWR provides an annual deer hunt for people with disabilities which accommodates nearly 20 hunters.

Rydell National Wildlife Refuge's objectives include:

- Provide nesting, feeding and resting habitat for waterfowl and other migratory woodland and grassland birds
- Serve as a regional destination for environmental education opportunities
- Provide woodland and prairie habitat for resident wildlife
- Provide opportunities for wildlife observation and outdoor recreation
