= Maple Bay, Minnesota =

Maple Bay
- Unincorporated community
- Location within Minnesota Location within the United States
- Coordinates: 47°38′09″N 96°13′30″W
- Country: United States
- State: Minnesota
- County: Polk
- Elevation: 1,178 ft (359 m)
- Time zone: UTC-6 (Central (CST))
  - Summer (DST): UTC-5 (CDT)
- Area code: 218
- GNIS feature ID: 647462

Maple Bay is an unincorporated community in Godfrey Township in central Polk County, Minnesota, United States. A community of second homes and cabins, it lies on the western end of Maple Lake, approximately six miles west of Erskine.

Maple Bay is located on a paved road which connects Mentor and U.S. Route 2 with County Road 41 en route to Fertile. The nearby lake is a summer resort and playground for residents of Crookston, Grand Forks, North Dakota and other nearby communities, and offers excellent ice fishing.

The place name dates back to 1882, when Maple Bay Post Office was established in Markham's general store. At various times, a creamery, two churches, a cheese factory, a blower factory and at least two blacksmith shops as well as several residences, were reported in the community. Since the 1920s, Maple Bay has evolved into a semi-rural residential area, usually with at least one general store catering to resort and second home residents of the area.

Local lodgings include Ulland's Resort and Campgrounds, Oak Cove Resort, Camp Shalom and Lakeview Resort Restaurant and Lounge (all listed in Mentor's yellow pages), as well as the Inn at Maple Crossing. The Maple Lake dance hall and roller rink, constructed in 1913, was no longer in business at last report.

== Sources ==
Olson, Roberta, Fertile, Hub of the "Sand Hill Valley", Fertile [Minnesota] Bicentennial Committee, 1976, pp. 49–50
