= Mahnomen City Hall =

- U.S. National Register of Historic Places
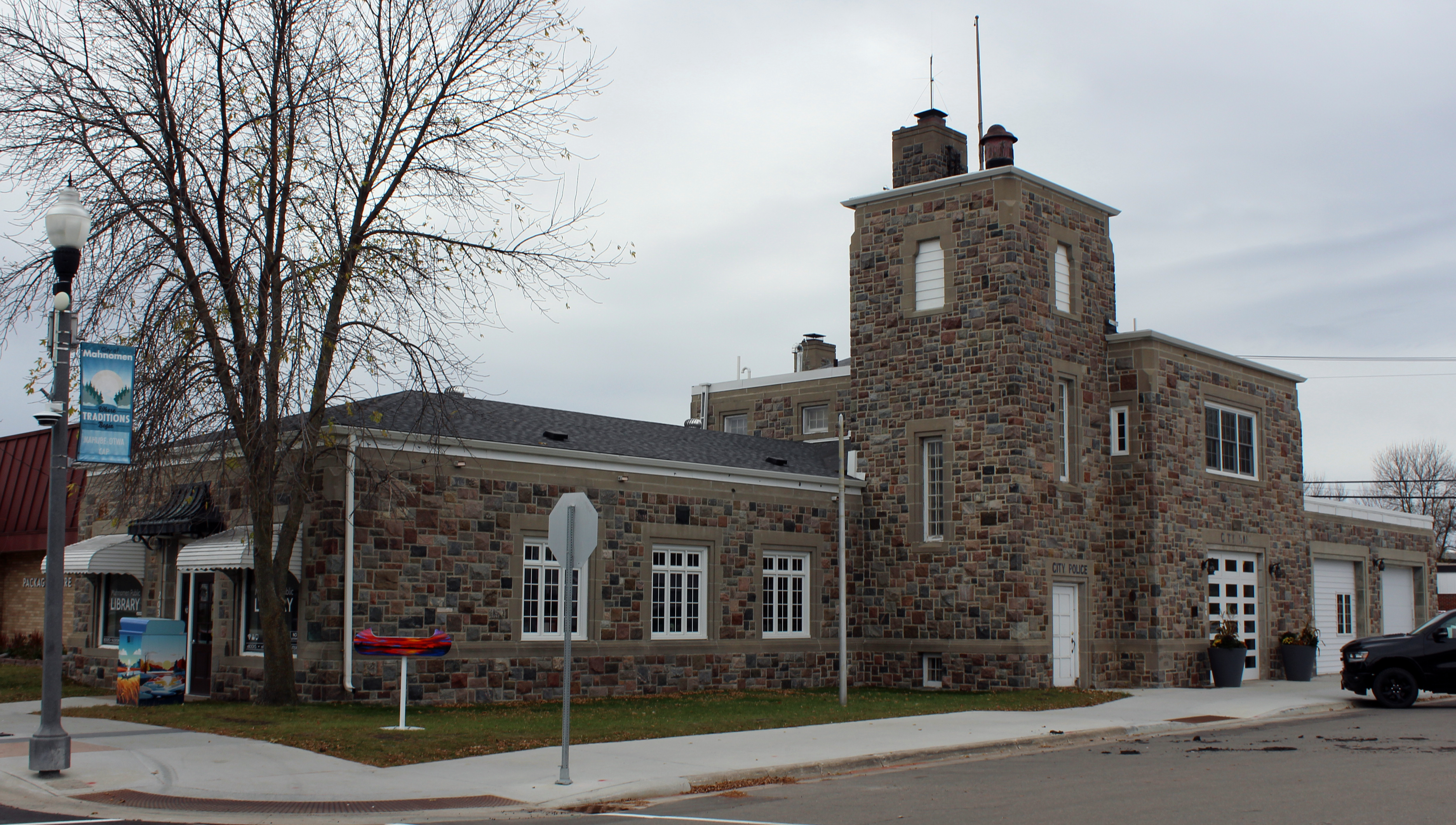
- Mahnomen City Hall showing library wing

- Location within Minnesota Location within the United States
- Location: 104 West Madison Avenue, Mahnomen
- Coordinates: 47°18′51″N 95°58′9″W
- Area: Less than one acre
- Built: 1937
- Architectural style: Moderne
- NRHP reference No.: 88003011
- Added to NRHP: December 22, 1988

Mahnomen City Hall is a 1937 fieldstone Moderne municipal center built by the Works Progress Administration at 104 West Madison Avenue, Mahnomen, Minnesota, United States.

It was still a working city hall when it was added to the National Register of Historic Places in 1988.

== See also ==
- National Register of Historic Places listings in Mahnomen County, Minnesota
