= Jalak Jobanputra =

American businesswomen and entrepreneur

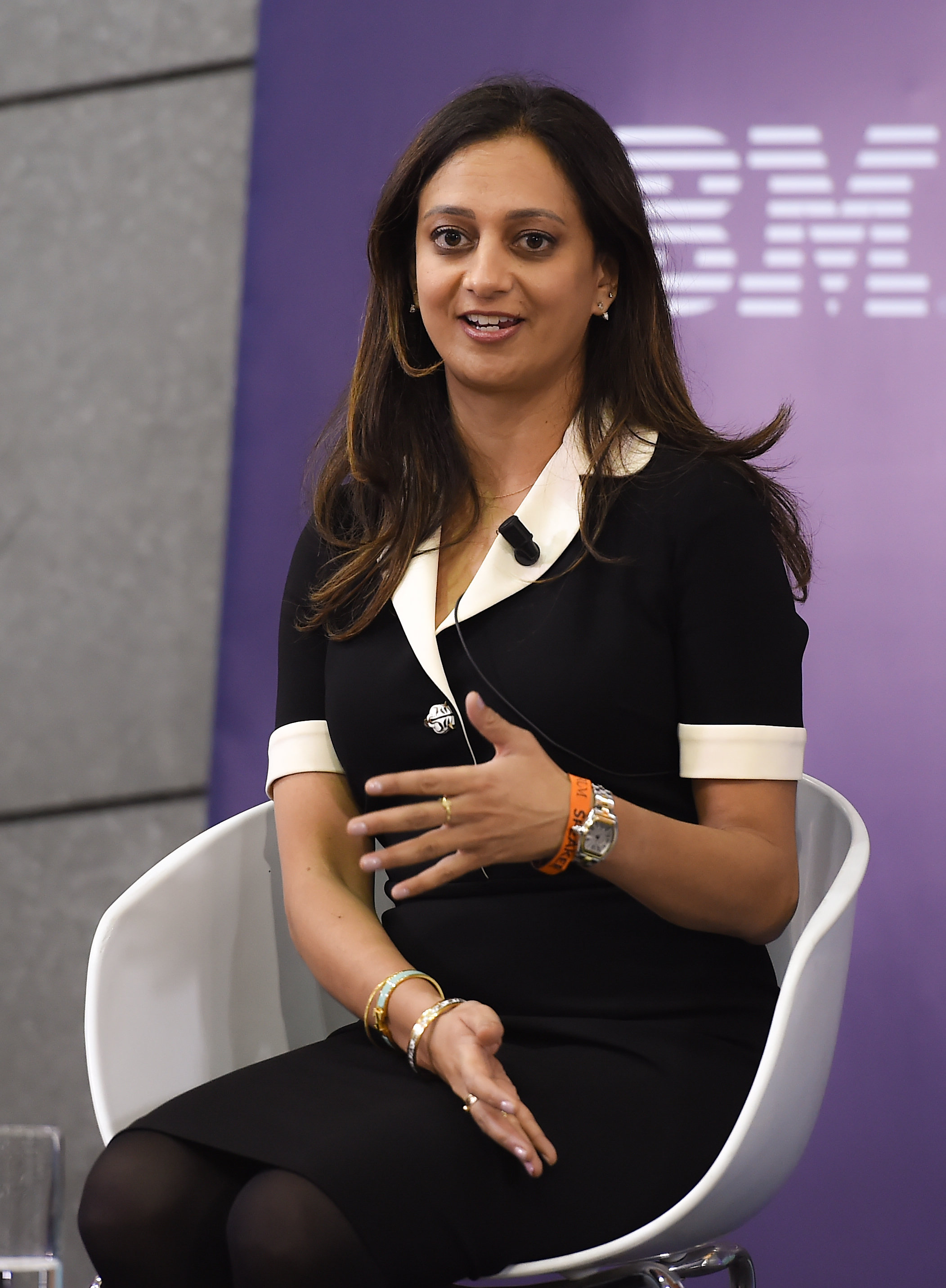
- Jobanputra in 2018
- Education: University of Pennsylvania (BA); Northwestern University (MA)
- Occupations: Investor, entrepreneur
- Years active: 1994-current
- Known for: Founder and founding partner at FuturePerfect Ventures

Jalak Jobanputra is an American businesswomen and entrepreneur. She founded the early-stage venture capital fund, FuturePerfect Ventures in 2014. Prior to founding the fund, Jobanputra was a director at Omidyar Network and a senior vice president at the New York City Investment Fund.

== Education and career ==
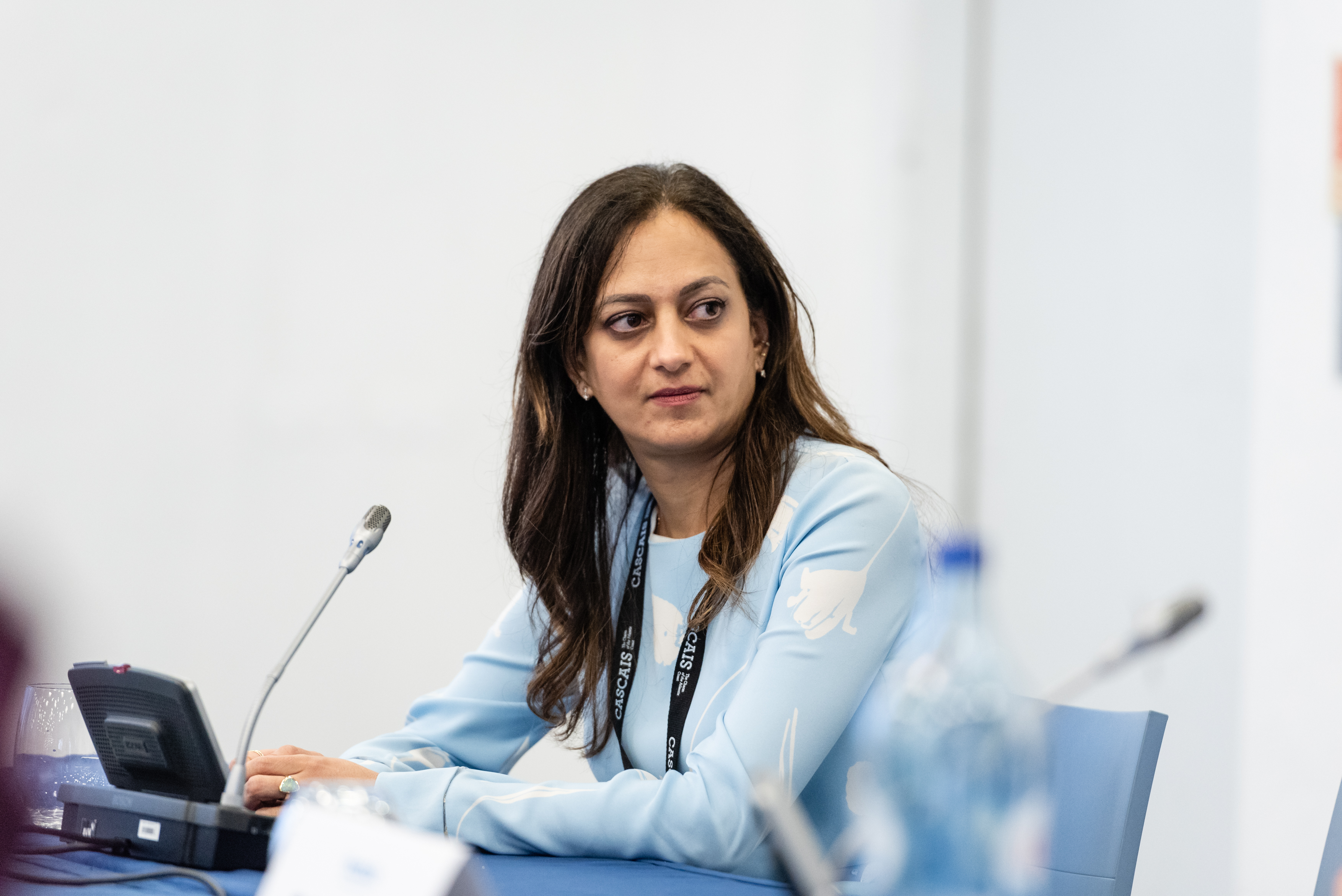
Jobanputra in 2019

Jobanputra received her BA from the Annenberg School for Communication and her BSE from Wharton at the University of Pennsylvania. She then completed her MBA at the Kellogg School of Management in 1999.

After completing her MBA, Jobanputra began working as an investor for Intel Capital until 2003. In 2005, while a principal at the fund, New Venture Partners, she founded Real Time Content, a personalized video ad platform company, and was interim CEO. In 2008, while senior vice president of the New York City Investment Fund, she helped to form the NYCSeed fund aimed at funding tech startups. In 2012, after being a director of mobile investments at Pierre Omidyar's fund, Omidyar Network, Jobanputra joined RTP Ventures as a managing director.

In 2014, Jobanputra founded the venture capital fund, FuturePerfect Ventures, one of the first funds worldwide to invest in nascent blockchain technology. The fund has invested in a number of notable companies including Abra, BitPesa, Everledger, Blockchain, Blockstream, Token, Current, and Maven.

Jobanputra was awarded Institutional Investor’s Most Powerful Fintech Dealmakers from 2016-2018. In May 2018, Jobanputra was awarded Microsoft’s VC Trailblazer Award for “her early and bold” investments in the sector. She has been listed as a 100 Most Influential Fintech Leader of 2016 and 2017 based on her investment strategy at FPV. In 2017, she was cited as a “Top 5 Investor Powering the Blockchain Boom” and Crunchbase noted FPV as one of the top VC funds in blockchain “before it was cool.” In 2015, she was selected to be a member of the Broadband Task Force, an initiative to bring internet to the low-income communities within New York City created by the Mayor, Bill de Blasio.

Jobanputra has appeared on CNBC, Bloomberg TV, Business Insider, Yahoo Finance, Refinery29 and Fox Business.
