= Maple Lake (Polk County) =

Lake in Polk County, Minnesota, United States

- Location within Minnesota Location within the United States
- Location: Polk County, Minnesota
- Coordinates: 47.6587°N 96.1578°W
- Type: artificial
- Basin countries: United States

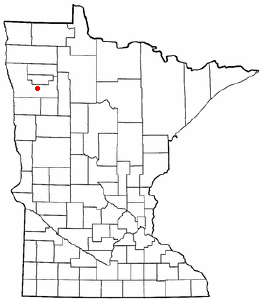
Location of Maple Lake, Minnesota

Maple Lake is a lake in central Polk County, Minnesota, United States, 2 miles (3.2 km) south of Mentor and about 4 miles (6.4 km) west of Erskine. The lake's name is taken from the extensive sugar maple forest that surrounds it. Even before European settlement of the region, the existence of these extensive hardwood forests in an otherwise treeless open prairie gave the lake a geographic identity. Maple Lake is a natural lake and the westernmost significant lake in northwestern Minnesota's Red River Valley. It appears on 19th-century maps of the area, and developed as a summer home and resort community as early as 1910. As a result of drought conditions and low inflows during the 1930s, the lake nearly dried up. Beginning in 1940 a two-stage Works Progress Administration development project involving the diversion of water from nearby Badger Lake and the Poplar River raised the lake to its current, artificially maintained level. This rejuvenated the resort industry, and the lake remains a popular summer home, recreational watersports and fishing lake, drawing people from eastern North Dakota and northwestern Minnesota as well as other neighboring states.

== Sources ==
- Maple Lake Citizen Monitoring Project Report, 'Maple Lake Assessment Report—1991', available on-line at http://redlakewatershed.org/projects.html.
- J. Hoveland, 'Whatever Happened to the Gar Wood? Tales of Life at Hoveland's Haven and the Restoration of Maple Lake' (priv.pub., July 2007).

== See also ==
- Maple Bay, Minnesota
