= Hector A. Hanson =

American farmer & politician (1904-1993)

Hector Ames Hanson (May 29, 1904 – September 20, 1993) was an American farmer and politician.

Hanson was born in Fertile, Polk County, Minnesota. He went to the Fertile Public Schools and to the Northwest School of Agriculture (now University of Minnesota Crookston) in Crookston, Minnesota. Hanson lived in Erskine, Minnesota, with his wife and family and was a farmer. Hanson served in the Minnesota House of Representatives from 1941 to 1944.
