= Abra, Texas =

Ghost town in Texas, US

Abra
- Ghost town
- Location in Texas
- Coordinates: 35.08160700°N 100.39735000°W
- Country: United States
- State: Texas
- County: Collingsworth

Abra is a ghost town in Collingsworth County, Texas, United States. Situated on the junction of Farm to Market Road 1547 and 3143, it began as a school district in the early 1900s. A post office operated between July 1908 and May 1917. In 1934, the school district consolidated with Samnorwood, and the community's ten residents moved to Dozier in the 1940s, leaving it abandoned.
