= Abra, Pakistan =

Place in Balochistan, Pakistan

Coordinates: 29°00′55″N 68°04′16″E

Abra is a populated place in Balochistan, Pakistan.

== See also ==
- Lohi
