= Lohi, Pakistan =

Coordinates: 28°56′0″N 68°4′0″E

Lohi لوهی
- Town
- Interactive map of Lohi لوهی
- Country: Pakistan
- Region: Balochistan
- District: Lasbela District
- Time zone: UTC+5 (PST)

Lohi is a town and union council of Dureji Tehsil in Balochistan province, Pakistan. It is located at 28°56'0N 68°4'0E with an altitude of 93 metres (308 feet).

== See also ==
- Abra
