= McIntosh, Minnesota =

City in Minnesota, United States

McIntosh
- City
- Location of McIntosh, Minnesota
- Coordinates: 47°38′13″N 95°53′11″W
- Country: United States
- State: Minnesota
- County: Polk
- Founded: 1883

Government
  - Type: Statutorial

Area
  - Total: 1.01 sq mi (2.61 km^{2})
  - Land: 1.00 sq mi (2.59 km^{2})
  - Water: 0.0077 sq mi (0.02 km^{2})
- Elevation: 1,230 ft (370 m)

Population (2020)
  - Total: 606
  - Estimate (2021): 591
  - Density: 606.5/sq mi (234.16/km^{2})
- Time zone: UTC-6 (CST)
  - Summer (DST): UTC-5 (CDT)
- ZIP code: 56556
- Area code: 218
- FIPS code: 27-39050
- GNIS feature ID: 2395072
- Website: ci.mcintosh.mn.us

McIntosh (/ˈmækɪntɒʃ/ MAK-in-tosh) is a city in Polk County, Minnesota, United States. It is part of the Grand Forks, ND-MN Metropolitan Statistical Area. The population was 606 at the 2020 census.

== History ==
When the "Thirteen Towns", 13 townships in Polk County, Minnesota, were opened for settlement in 1883, settlers homesteaded the region. King Township, which contained the village of McIntosh, was one of the 13. The village was named for Angus John (A.J.) McIntosh, a man of Scottish descent, who immigrated from French Canada to the United States in 1870. He lived most of his years on the White Earth Indian Reservation north of Detroit Lakes, Minnesota. The only census in which he was residing in King Township was the 1895 Minnesota State Census.

McIntosh's population has decreased since the 1940s.

== Geography ==
According to the United States Census Bureau, the city has an area of 1.00 square mile (2.59 km^{2}), of which 0.99 square miles (2.56 km^{2}) is land and 0.01 square miles (0.03 km^{2}) is water.

== Demographics ==
Historical population
Census	Pop.	Note	%±
1900	569		—
1910	634		11.4%
1920	805		27.0%
1930	688		−14.5%
1940	903		31.3%
1950	881		−2.4%
1960	785		−10.9%
1970	753		−4.1%
1980	681		−9.6%
1990	670		−1.6%
2000	638		−4.8%
2010	625		−2.0%
2020	606		−3.0%
2021 (est.)	591		−2.5%
U.S. Decennial Census; 2020 Census

=== 2010 census ===
As of the census of 2010, there were 625 people, 285 households, and 155 families living in the city. The population density was 631.3 inhabitants per square mile (243.7/km^{2}). There were 311 housing units at an average density of 314.1 per square mile (121.3/km^{2}). The racial makeup of the city was 95.8% White, 1.3% Native American, 0.2% Asian, 0.2% Pacific Islander, and 2.6% from two or more races. Hispanic or Latino of any race were 1.8% of the population.

There were 285 households, of which 21.8% had children under the age of 18 living with them, 44.2% were married couples living together, 7.0% had a female householder with no husband present, 3.2% had a male householder with no wife present, and 45.6% were non-families. 41.4% of all households were made up of individuals, and 22.1% had someone living alone who was 65 years of age or older. The average household size was 2.03 and the average family size was 2.72.

The median age in the city was 48.4 years. 18.2% of residents were under the age of 18; 7.8% were between the ages of 18 and 24; 19% were from 25 to 44; 26.2% were from 45 to 64; and 28.8% were 65 years of age or older. The gender makeup of the city was 48.0% male and 52.0% female.

=== 2000 census ===
As of the census of 2000, there were 638 people, 262 households, and 160 families living in the city. The population density was 642.0 inhabitants per square mile (247.9/km^{2}). There were 285 housing units at an average density of 286.8 per square mile (110.7/km^{2}). The racial makeup of the city was 97.65% White, 0.78% Native American, 0.31% Asian, and 1.25% from two or more races. Hispanic or Latino of any race were 2.04% of the population.

There were 262 households, out of which 24.8% had children under the age of 18 living with them, 48.5% were married couples living together, 9.2% had a female householder with no husband present, and 38.9% were non-families. 37.8% of all households were made up of individuals, and 26.3% had someone living alone who was 65 years of age or older. The average household size was 2.12 and the average family size was 2.71.

In the city, the population was spread out, with 18.8% under the age of 18, 4.1% from 18 to 24, 17.6% from 25 to 44, 24.5% from 45 to 64, and 35.1% who were 65 years of age or older. The median age was 53 years. For every 100 females, there were 88.8 males. For every 100 females age 18 and over, there were 94.0 males.

The median income for a household in the city was $31,328, and the median income for a family was $38,529. Males had a median income of $31,250 versus $21,875 for females. The per capita income for the city was $20,676. About 4.9% of families and 7.6% of the population were below the poverty line, including 5.9% of those under age 18 and 13.5% of those age 65 or over.
