= Abra J. Powers =

American politician (1883–1971)

Abra J. Powers (November 24, 1883 – August 12, 1971) was an American lawyer and politician.

Powers was born in Granite Falls, Minnesota. He received his law degree from the University of Minnesota Law School in 1911. Powers lived in Mahnomen, Minnesota with his wife and family. He served in the Minnesota House of Representatives from 1931 to 1946 and was an Independent.
