= Abra K. Maynard =

American politician (1803–1894)

Abra K. Maynard (April 25, 1803 – December 18, 1894) was an American farmer and politician.

Maynard was born in Madison County, New York and moved to Minnesota in 1862. He lived in Elysian, Minnesota, Atwater, Minnesota, and in Cleveland, Minnesota. Maynard was a farmer. He served in the Minnesota House of Representatives in 1866 and 1867.
