= Abra Lee =

Horticultural writer

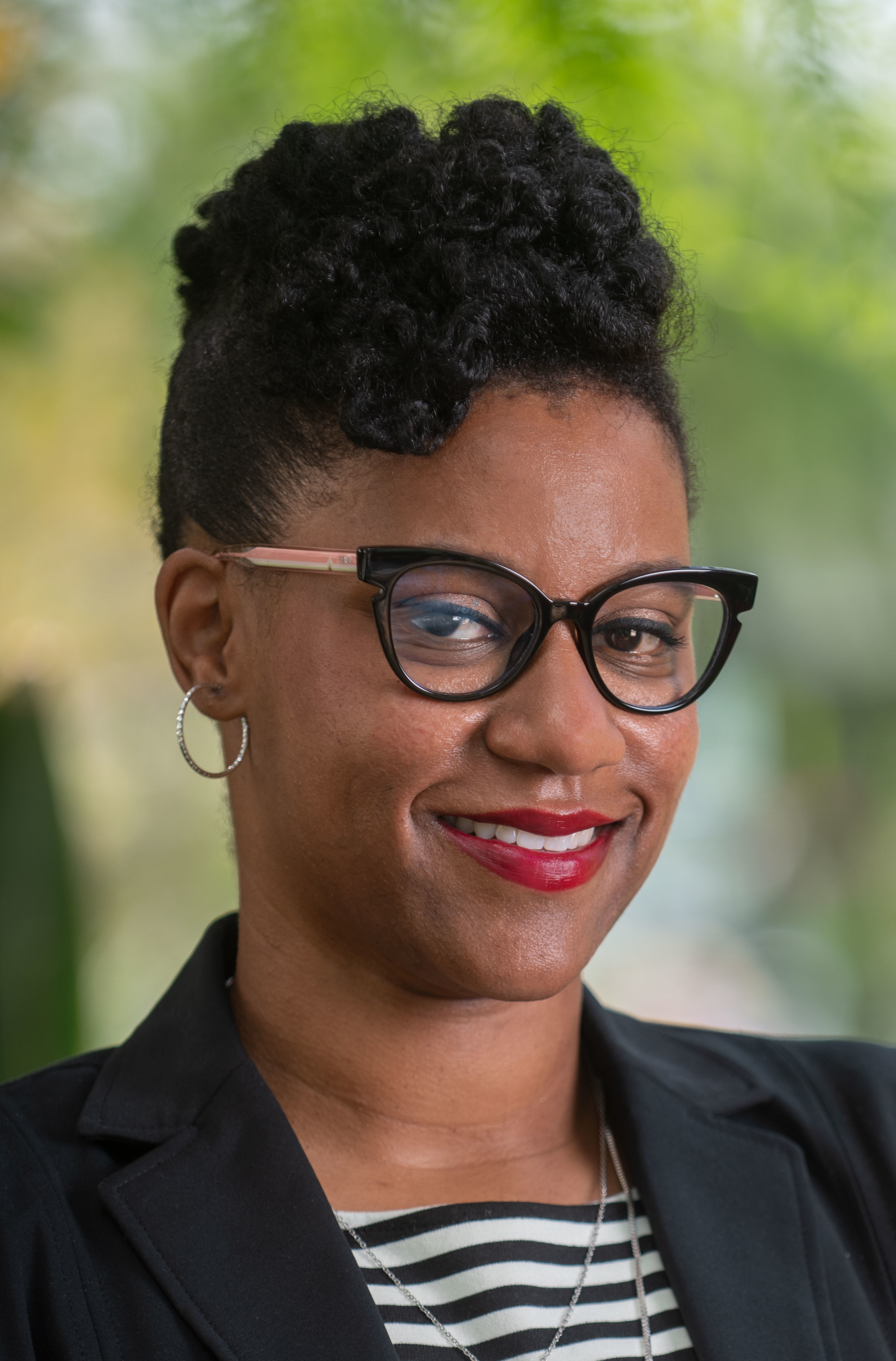
- Lee in 2021
- Born: 1978 (age 47–48); Atlanta, Georgia, U.S.
- Education: Auburn University
- Occupations: Historian; public horticulturalist
- Awards: 2019-20 Longwood Fellow
- Website: conquerthesoil.com

Abra Lee (born 1978) is an American public horticulturalist, historian and writer, who researches Black garden history and raises awareness of the subject through social media.

== Career ==
Lee graduated from Auburn University with a degree in Ornamental Horticulture. She has worked in a number of horticultural roles, including: with the University of Georgia as a County Extension Agent for Fulton County; as Landscape Manager for Hartsfield-Jackson Atlanta International Airport; as a horticulturalist at George Bush Intercontinental Airport; as a municipal arborist at City of Atlanta Department of Parks.

As of 2021, Lee worked as a freelance horticultural writer and lecturer, for institutions such as the Lady Bird Johnson Wildflower Centre, Temple University, Smithsonian Gardens, and others. Her work seeks to break down the barriers that prevent black people participating in horticulture. She does this through researching and highlighting the lives of Black women in horticulture, from antebellum history to the present day. Lee says that the "beautiful thing about Black garden history is that it can't be separated from Black history and it can't be separated from American history". She founded the social media platform Conquer the Soil, which raises horticultural awareness through Black garden history and current events.

Lee was selected a 2019-20 Longwood Gardens Fellow. As part of her fellowship she travelled to Château de Villandry where she researched lesser known histories of the garden, as well as supporting a curatorial project which compared the lives of Ann Coleman Carvallo at Château Villandry and Anne Spencer of Lynchburg. Her first book Conquer the Soil: Black America and the Untold Stories of Our Country's Gardeners, Farmers, and Growers is due to be published in 2022 by Indigo Books.
