= Goodliffe's Abracadabra =

- First issue: February 2, 1946
- Final issue Number: March 28, 2009; 3,296

Abracadabra was a British weekly magic magazine whose publication life spanned sixty-three years. The first issue was published on 2 February 1946; the last issue was published on 28 March 2009; a total of 3,296 issues.

== Name ==
Although the magazine name was Abracadabra, it was also known as Goodliffe's Abracadabra and the readers nicknamed it Abra.

== Origins ==
The weekly magazine Abracadabra was created by Charles Goodliffe Neale (1912 – December 26, 1980). He was a magician and author. From the very first issue, Goodliffe (as he preferred to be called) gave the magazine the cover tag line of "The Only Magical Weekly in the World". Goodliffe was a man of strong views and the magazine became the arena of many controversial debates about magic and magicians, sometimes initiated by the readers themselves through their contributions and letters.

== After Goodliffe's death ==
After Goodliffe's death, Davenports (one of London's oldest family run magic shops) and Rabbi Sam Gringras (Magico of New York) put together a rescue package and the magazine continued its publication uninterrupted. Goodliffe is buried in St Peter's St Paul's & St Elizabeth's Churchyard, Coughton, Stratford-on-Avon District, Warwickshire, England. This information was extracted from Findagrave, where a transcript of the inscription can be seen.

== Editors ==
All the editors have been professional magicians. Originally, Goodliffe himself was the principal editor with the help of associate editor Fabian (Ernest Raymond Griffiths, 1912–1965). The next editor, who continued as editor after Goodliffe's death and kept Abracadabra running, was Donald Bevan. The final editor was Walt Lees.

== Contributors ==
Over the decades the magazine not only included articles from its regular readers but also from television magicians such as David Nixon, Wayne Dobson, Paul Daniels and Jerry Sadowitz. In its later years, contributions came from authors such as Paul Gordon and John Helvin. The contents of the magazine was news, reviews, magic tricks and articles on magic as a performing art and its history; the quality of the content varied over the years.

== Demise ==
In issue 3295, on 21 March 2009, the Davenport family announced that Abracadabra was to change owners. The new owner would be a "magical enthusiast" named Stephen Martin. However, for undisclosed reasons, the deal fell through and the next issue of Abracadabra announced its closure as a publication. In his final editorial Walt Lees wrote "…when I took over the job, it was made clear to me that Abra was struggling. Times were changing and with the growth of so much internet traffic, the demand for a hardcopy weekly was falling off dramatically." Lees was initially given a year to salvage the magazine, which became two years. Lees wrote "… I did my best. Sadly my best wasn't good enough." For some, this statement made it appear that Lees was taking the blame for the magazine's demise and articles were written in his defence by people, such as John Helvin. and Al Smith, which highlighted contributing factors to the magazine's demise which were beyond Walt Lees' control.
