= ABRA (gene) =

Protein-coding gene in the species Homo sapiens

Identifiers
- Aliases: ABRA, STARS, actin binding Rho activating protein
- External IDs: OMIM: 609747; MGI: 2444891; HomoloGene: 34713; GeneCards: ABRA; OMA:ABRA - orthologs

Gene location (Human)
Chr.	Chromosome 8 (human)
Band	8q23.1	Start	106,759,483 bp
Band	8q23.1	End	106,770,244 bp

Gene location (Mouse)
Chr.	Chromosome 15 (mouse)
Band	15|15 B3.1	Start	41,727,472 bp
Band	15|15 B3.1	End	41,733,116 bp
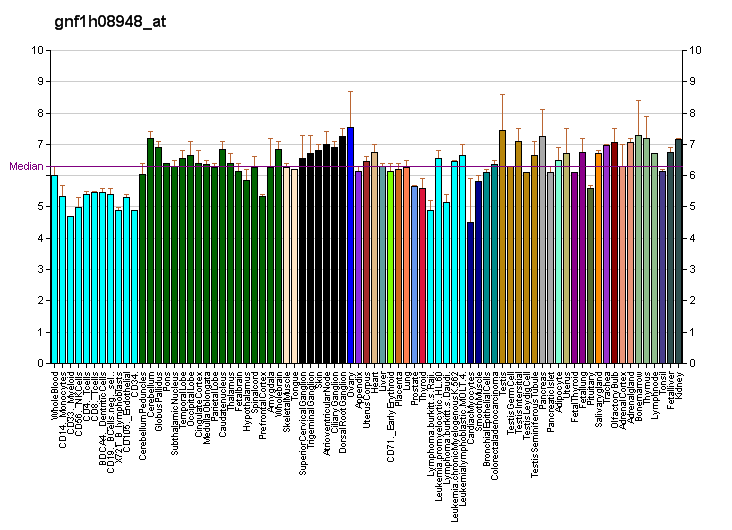
RNA expression pattern
Bgee	Human / Mouse (ortholog); Top expressed in: Skeletal muscle tissue of rectus abdominis; Skeletal muscle tissue of biceps brachii; quadriceps femoris muscle; vastus lateralis muscle; deltoid muscle; right ventricle; muscle of thigh; gastrocnemius muscle; myocardium; body of tongue / Top expressed in: interventricular septum; muscle of thigh; soleus muscle; knee joint; extraocular muscle; quadriceps femoris muscle; vastus lateralis muscle; digastric muscle; tibialis anterior muscle; gastrocnemius muscle; More reference expression data
BioGPS	More reference expression data
Gene ontology
Molecular function	actin binding
Cellular component	cytoplasm; plasma membrane; sarcomere; myofibril; cytoskeleton; actin cytoskeleton
Biological process	positive regulation of Rho protein signal transduction; protein transport; positive regulation of transcription, DNA-templated; positive regulation of DNA-binding transcription factor activity; regulation of transcription, DNA-templated; transcription, DNA-templated; positive regulation of transcription by RNA polymerase II; protein import into nucleus
Sources:Amigo / QuickGO
Orthologs
Species	Human	Mouse
Entrez	137735	223513
Ensembl	ENSG00000174429	ENSMUSG00000042895
UniProt	Q8N0Z2	Q8BUZ1
RefSeq (mRNA)	NM_139166	NM_175456
RefSeq (protein)	NP_631905	NP_780665
Location (UCSC)	Chr 8: 106.76 – 106.77 Mb	Chr 15: 41.73 – 41.73 Mb
PubMed search
- Wikidata
View/Edit Human	View/Edit Mouse

Actin-binding Rho-activating protein is a protein that in humans is encoded by the ABRA gene. The mouse and rat homologues are known as STARS (striated muscle activator of Rho signalling) and MS1 (myocyte stress 1) respectively.

MS1/STARS is regulated by MyoD during myogenic differentiation of the C2C12 cell line.
