= Mentor, Minnesota =

City in Minnesota, United States

- City
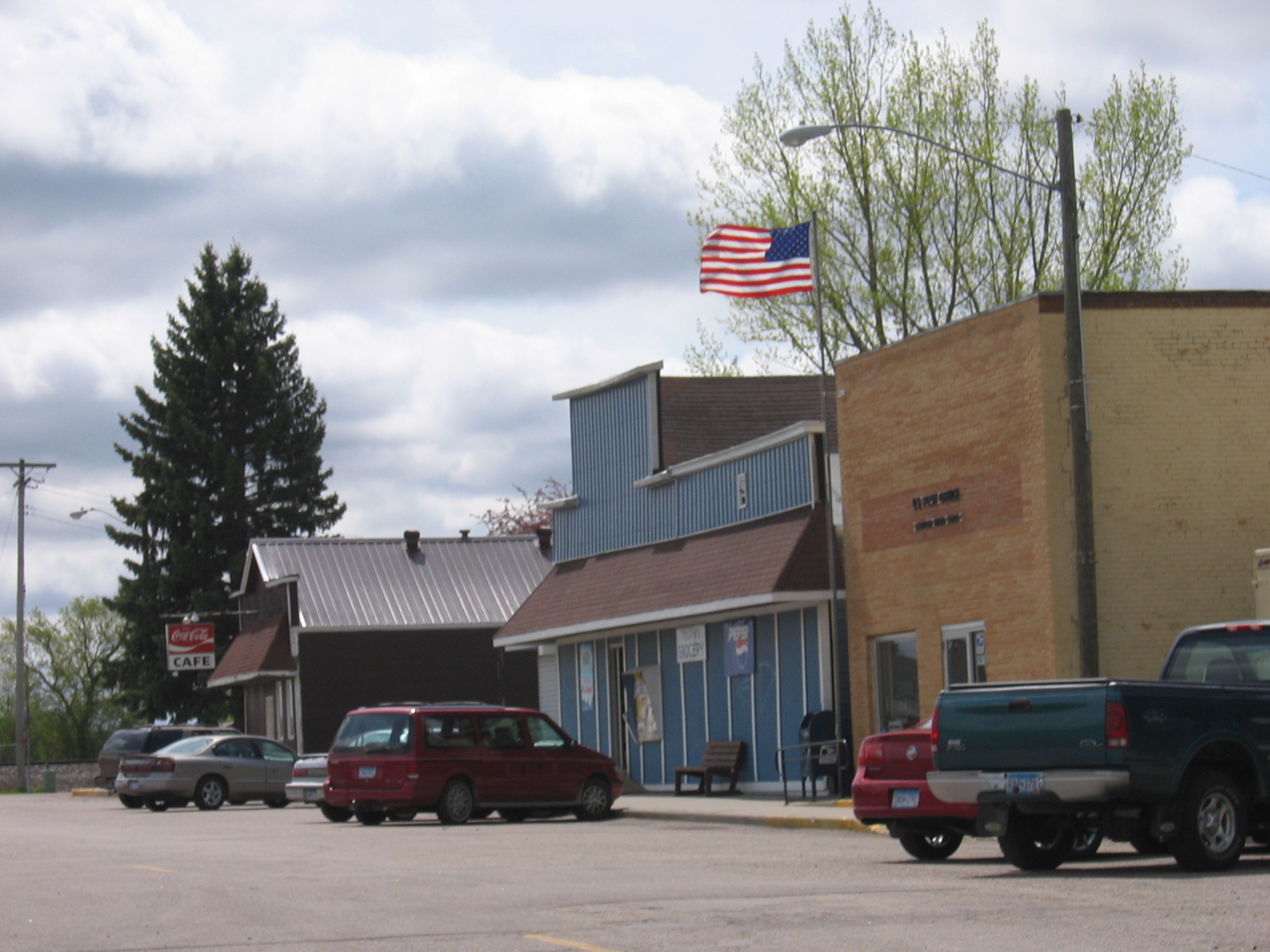
- Downtown Mentor in 2007

- Location of Mentor, Minnesota
- Coordinates: 47°41′48″N 96°08′39″W
- Country: United States
- State: Minnesota
- County: Polk
- Established: 1882
- Platted: September 21, 1892
- Incorporated: January 11, 1902

Government
  - Mayor: Lonnie Morberg

Area
  - Total: 1.905 sq mi (4.934 km^{2})
  - Land: 1.905 sq mi (4.934 km^{2})
  - Water: 0 sq mi (0.000 km^{2})
- Elevation: 1,175 ft (358 m)

Population (2020)
  - Total: 104
  - Estimate (2022): 105
  - Density: 54.6/sq mi (21.08/km^{2})
- Time zone: UTC−6 (Central (CST))
  - Summer (DST): UTC−5 (CDT)
- ZIP Code: 56736
- Area code: 218
- FIPS code: 27-41714
- GNIS feature ID: 2395100
- Sales tax: 7.125%

Mentor is a city in Polk County, Minnesota, United States. It is part of the Grand Forks-ND-MN Metropolitan Statistical Area. The population was 104 at the 2020 census. The city is near Maple Lake.

== History ==
A post office called Mentor has been in operation since 1882. The city was named after Mentor, Ohio.

== Geography ==
According to the United States Census Bureau, the city has an area of 1.905 square miles (4.93 km^{2}), all land.

== Demographics ==
Historical population
Census	Pop.	Note	%±
1910	222		—
1920	255		14.9%
1930	265		3.9%
1940	287		8.3%
1950	321		11.8%
1960	381		18.7%
1970	236		−38.1%
1980	219		−7.2%
1990	185		−15.5%
2000	150		−18.9%
2010	153		2.0%
2020	104		−32.0%
2022 (est.)	105		1.0%
U.S. Decennial Census; 2020 Census

=== 2010 census ===
As of the census of 2010, there were 153 people, 79 households, and 39 families living in the city. The population density was 81.8 inhabitants per square mile (31.6/km^{2}). There were 95 housing units at an average density of 50.8 per square mile (19.6/km^{2}). The racial makeup of the city was 96.7% White, 1.3% Native American, and 2.0% from two or more races. Hispanic or Latino of any race were 2.0% of the population.

There were 79 households, of which 17.7% had children under the age of 18 living with them, 34.2% were married couples living together, 10.1% had a female householder with no husband present, 5.1% had a male householder with no wife present, and 50.6% were non-families. 43.0% of all households were made up of individuals, and 21.5% had someone living alone who was 65 years of age or older. The average household size was 1.94 and the average family size was 2.59.

The median age in the city was 50.8 years. 15% of residents were under the age of 18; 8.5% were between the ages of 18 and 24; 16.4% were from 25 to 44; 37.3% were from 45 to 64; and 22.9% were 65 years of age or older. The gender makeup of the city was 52.3% male and 47.7% female.

=== 2000 census ===
As of the census of 2000, there were 150 people, 82 households, and 45 families living in the city. The population density was 79.3 inhabitants per square mile (30.6/km^{2}). There were 102 housing units at an average density of 53.9 per square mile (20.8/km^{2}). The racial makeup of the city was 100.00% White.

There were 82 households, out of which 17.1% had children under the age of 18 living with them, 42.7% were married couples living together, 6.1% had a female householder with no husband present, and 45.1% were non-families. 41.5% of all households were made up of individuals, and 26.8% had someone living alone who was 65 years of age or older. The average household size was 1.83 and the average family size was 2.44.

In the city, the population was spread out, with 14.0% under the age of 18, 4.7% from 18 to 24, 24.0% from 25 to 44, 30.7% from 45 to 64, and 26.7% who were 65 years of age or older. The median age was 49 years. For every 100 females, there were 105.5 males. For every 100 females age 18 and over, there were 104.8 males.

The median income for a household in the city was $21,705, and the median income for a family was $27,917. Males had a median income of $24,688 versus $16,250 for females. The per capita income for the city was $12,972. There were 3.6% of families and 13.5% of the population living below the poverty line, including no under eighteens and 29.4% of those over 64.

== Gallery ==
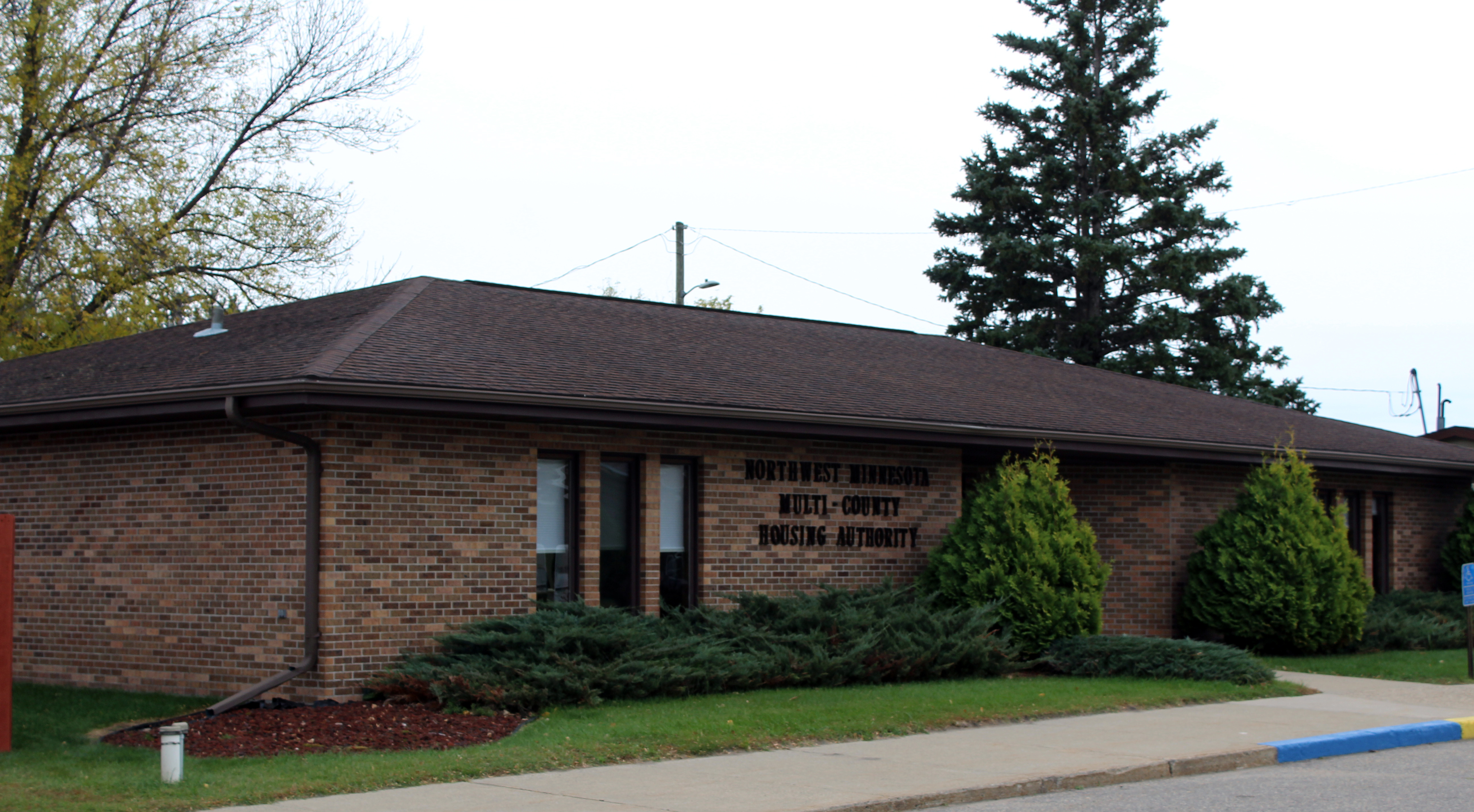
Northwest Minnesota Multi-County Housing Authority

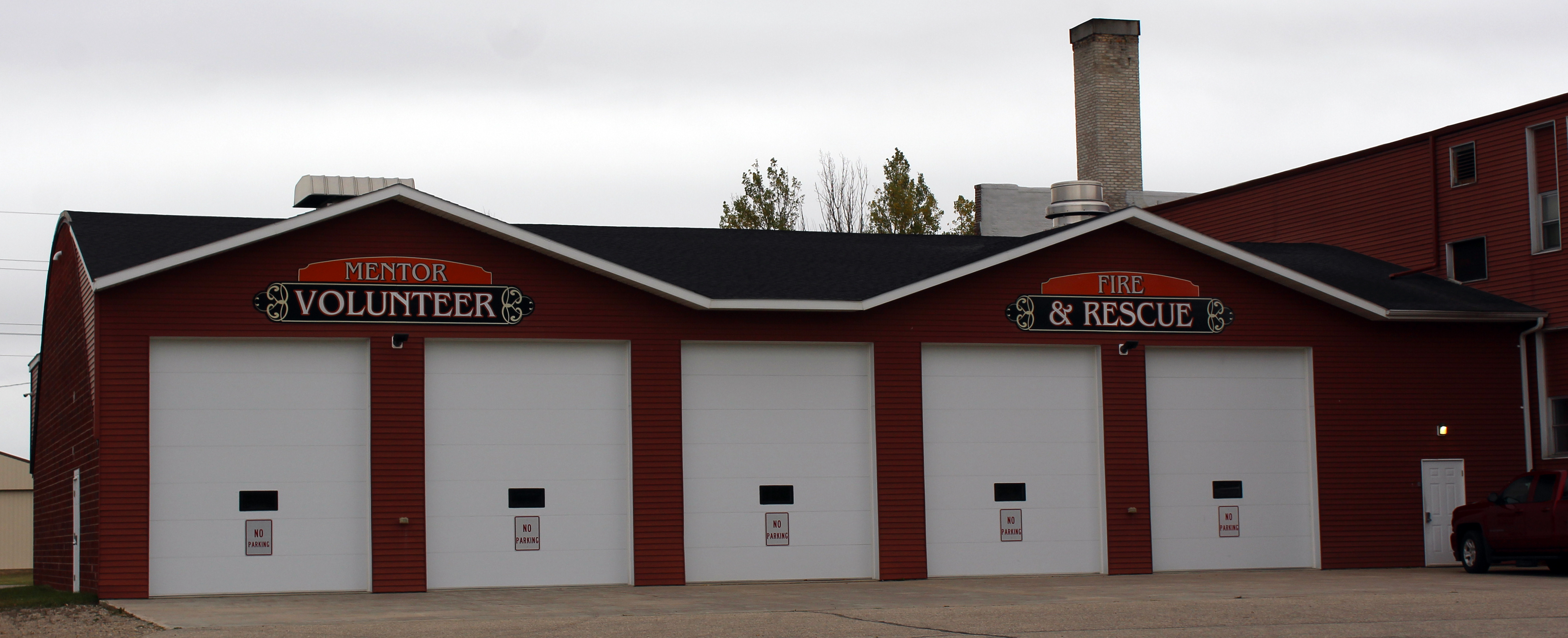
Volunteer Fire Department

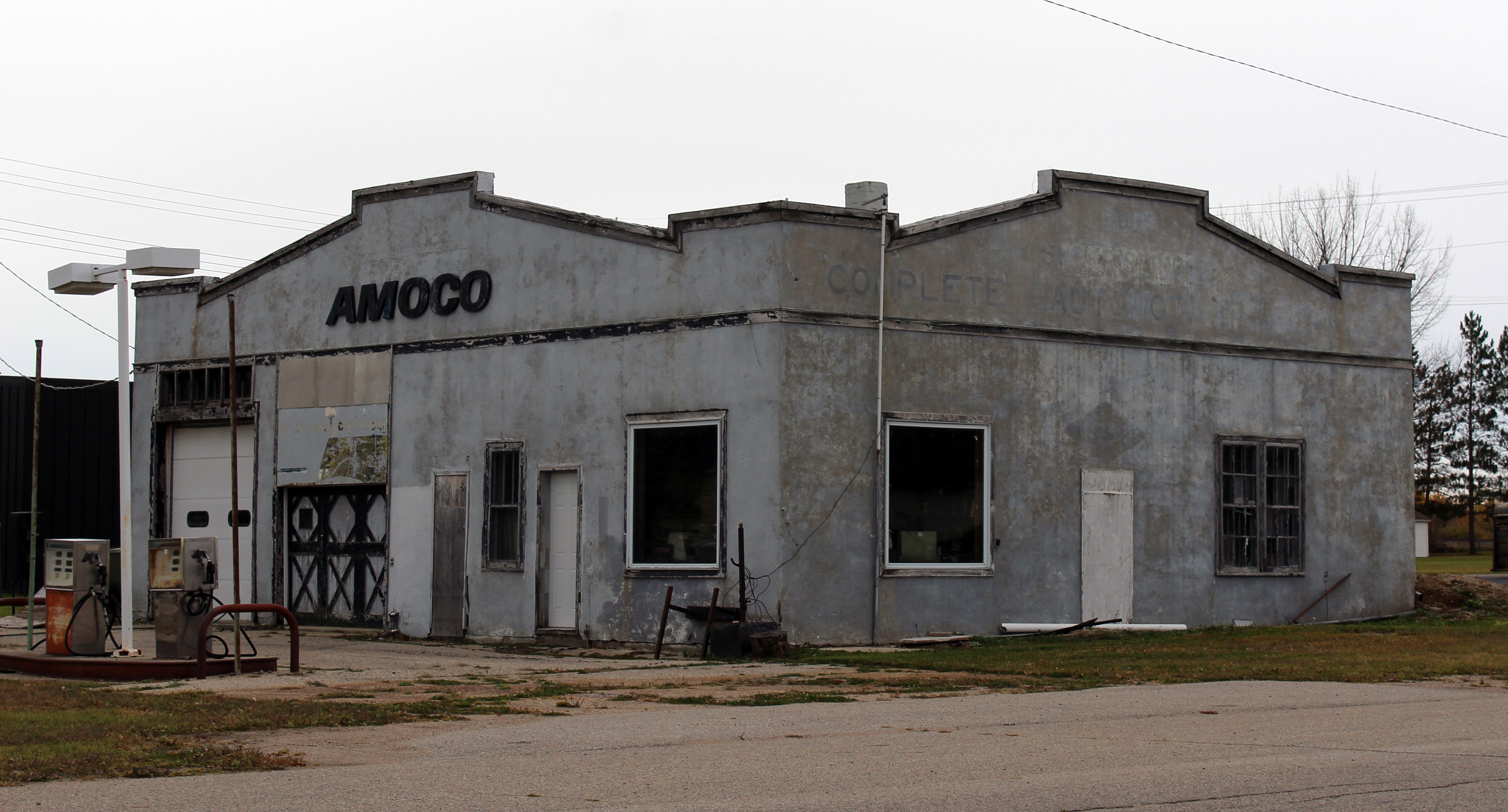
Gas Station

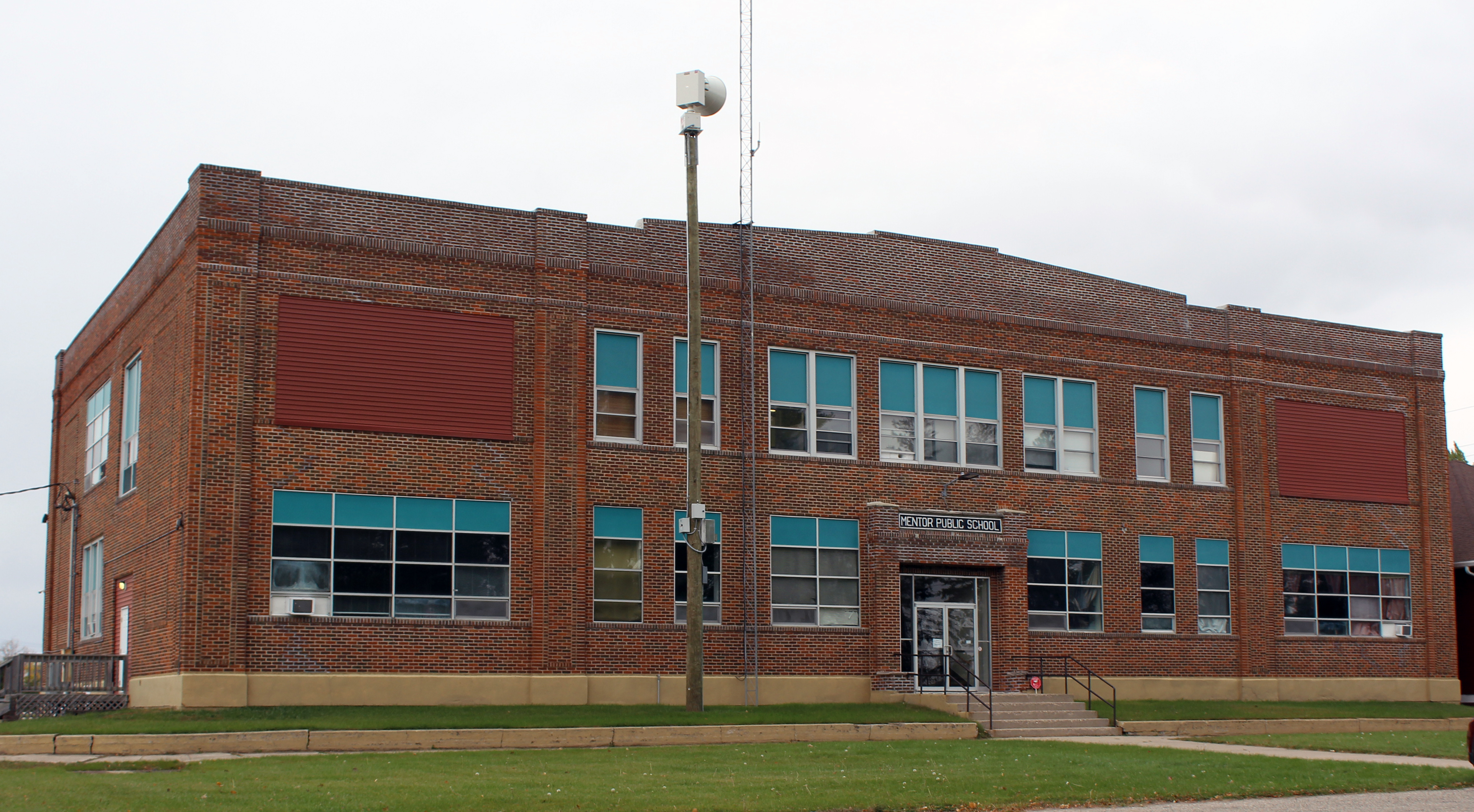
Mentor Public School

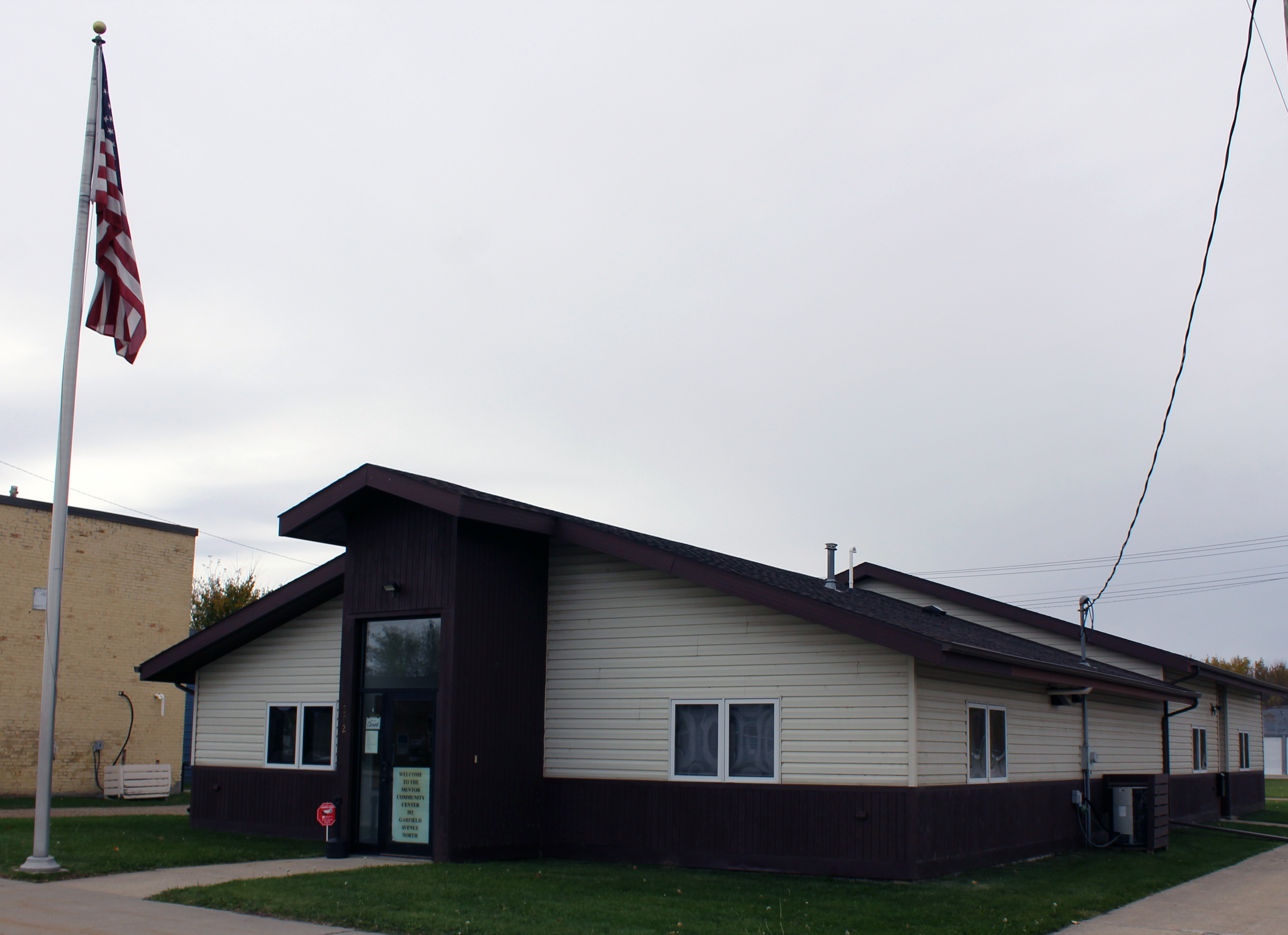
Community Center
