= Cameron Lake (Polk County, Minnesota) =

Lake in the state of Minnesota, United States

- Location within Minnesota
- Location: Polk County
- Coordinates: 47°39′56″N 96°1′12″W
- Type: Lake
- Surface elevation: 1,184 feet (361 m)

Cameron Lake is a lake in Polk County, in the U.S. state of Minnesota.

Cameron Lake was named for Daniel Cameron, a pioneer settler.

== See also ==
- List of lakes in Minnesota
