= Abra (company) =

Financial services and technology company

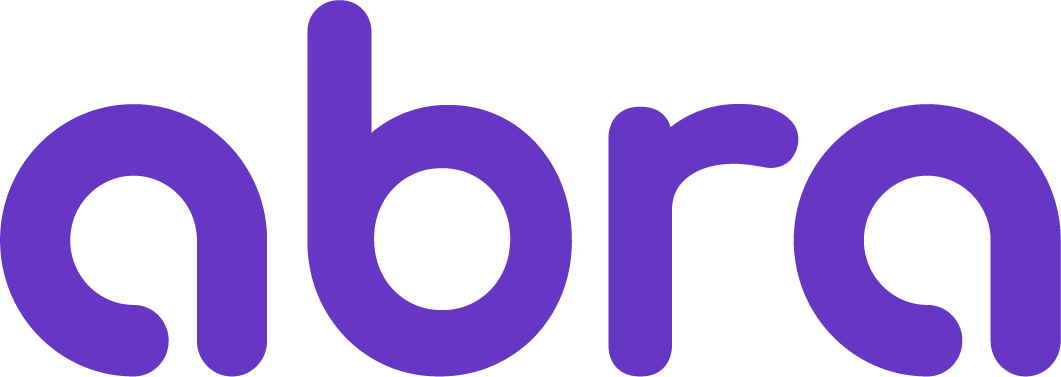
- Type: Private
- Industry: Financial services
- Founded: 2014
- Founder: Bill Barhydt
- Headquarters: Mountain View, California, US
- Area served: Worldwide
- Key people: Bill Barhydt (CEO)
- Services: Institutional wealth management, prime brokerage, treasury services
- Website: www.abra.com

Abra is a cryptocurrency wallet and exchange and a digital asset services company with offices in several countries. Its offerings include Abra Private, an SEC-registered investment advisory service for high-net-worth investors and family offices; Abra Prime, a prime broker for digital asset trading, lending, and derivatives; and Abra Treasury, which enables companies to add Bitcoin and digital assets to their corporate treasury.

== History ==
Abra was founded in 2014 in Silicon Valley by Bill Barhydt, a former fixed income analyst for Goldman Sachs and former director of Netscape.

In June 2018, The Wall Street Journal listed Abra among its "Top 25 Tech Companies to Watch in 2018".

In September 2021 Abra announced that it had raised an additional $55M in Series C funding, bringing its total raised to date to over $85M. Investors in the financing included American Express Ventures, Blockchain Capital, Kingsway Capital and CMT Digital Ventures.

Abra and Barhydt started the YouTube series Money Talks. Interviews have included MicroStrategy CEO and Bitcoin supporter Michael Saylor, Ethereum founder Vitalik Buterin, Bitcoin Cash supporter Roger Ver, Zcash creator Zooko Wilcox, Bitwise CEO Hunter Horsley, and venture capitalists Tim and Adam Draper.

In 2021 Forbes named Abra one of its next Billion-Dollar Startups.

== Regulatory issues ==
In June 2023, the Texas State Securities Board filed an emergency cease and desist order against Abra, alleging insolvency and misleading practices. Abra reached a settlement in 2024 that allowed withdrawals for affected investors. In July 2025, Abra reportedly paused withdrawals for some international clients, prompting concerns among users about liquidity and platform stability.
