= Minnesota's 8th congressional district =

U.S. House district for Minnesota

Coordinates: 47°15′01″N 92°57′50″W

- Interactive map of district boundaries since January 3, 2023
- Representative: Pete Stauber; R–Hermantown
- Area: 27,583 mi^{2} (71,440 km^{2})
- Distribution: 61.53% rural; 38.47% urban
- Population (2025): 735,980
- Median household income: $79,518
- Ethnicity: 87.0% White; 4.5% Two or more races; 4.3% Native American; 1.9% Hispanic; 1.2% Black; 0.8% Asian; 0.3% other
- Cook PVI: R+7

Minnesota's 8th congressional district covers the northeastern part of Minnesota. It is anchored by Duluth, the state's fifth-largest city. It also includes most of the Mesabi & Vermilion iron ranges, and the Boundary Waters Canoe Area in the Superior National Forest. The district has robust mining, agriculture, tourism, and shipping industries.

The district is currently represented by Republican Pete Stauber.

== History ==
Minnesota's 8th congressional district was first established after the 1900 census and first contested in 1902. Early settlement patterns of the district were from Northern Europe (especially from the Nordics), leading to a predominantly white, working-class population tied to extractive industries. From 1933 to 1935, the district was temporarily inactive, with representatives elected at-large statewide due to redistricting disputes resolved by the U.S. Supreme Court in Smiley v. Holm (1932). The district had initial Republican dominance but gave way to third-party influences and eventually to the Democratic-Farmer-Labor (DFL) party.

The first representative was Republican James Bede, who served from 1903 to 1909, followed by Clarence B. Miller (Republican, 1909–1919). In 1918, William Leighton Carss won as a Farmer-Labor candidate, serving until 1921 and again from 1925 to 1929 after brief Republican control.

Post-World War II, the district solidified as a DFL stronghold, with John Blatnik serving from 1947 to 1974. He was succeeded by DFLer Jim Oberstar (1975–2011), who chaired the House Transportation Committee and held the seat for 36 years. Redistricting in the 1980s and after usually involved courts due to legislative gridlock. After the 1980 census, a federal court ordered new districts in 1982 following a lawsuit. A similar situation occurred in 1992 (after state and federal court disputes), 2002 (via a judicial panel), and 2012 (following a gubernatorial veto). These changes expanded the district southward and added more rural and suburban areas like Chisago and Isanti counties.

After nearly six decades of comfortably voting DFL, Republican Chip Cravaack defeated Oberstar in 2010 amid discontent with the economy and backlash against the recently passed Affordable Care Act. DFLer Rick Nolan recaptured it in 2012, serving until 2019 after narrow 2014 and 2016 wins. Despite Nolan's win, Donald Trump carried the district by a 15-point margin in the concurrent presidential election. In the 2018 midterm election, it was one of only three congressional districts in the country which flipped to Republican. Republican Pete Stauber won re-elections in 2020, 2022, and 2024 with growing margins each time.

=== Apportionment ===
The district was the last district assigned nationwide after both the 2010 and 2020 censuses. After the 2020 census in particular, in spite of early predictions that it would be eliminated, Minnesota held onto the district by a mere 89 people, beating out New York's 27th district for the last spot.

== Composition ==
For the 118th and successive Congresses (based on redistricting following the 2020 census), the district contains all or portions of the following counties, townships, and municipalities:

Aitkin County (46)

All 46 townships and municipalities

Becker County (14)

Callaway, Callaway Township, Eagle View Township, Forest Township, Maple Grove Township, Ogema, Pine Point Township, Riceville Township, Round Lake Township, Savannah Township, Spring Creek Township, Sugar Bush Township, Two Inlets Township, White Earth Township

Beltrami County (50)

All 50 townships and municipalities

Carlton County (28)

All 28 townships and municipalities

Cass County (65)

All 65 townships and municipalities

Chisago County (18)

All 18 townships and municipalities

Clearwater County (27)

All 27 townships and municipalities

Cook County (4)

All 4 townships and municipalities

Crow Wing County (46)

All 46 townships and municipalities

Hubbard County (20)

Akeley Township, Arago Township, Clay Township, Clover Township, Farden Township, Fern Township, Guthrie Township, Hart Lake Township, Helga Township, Hendrickson Township, Lake Alice Township, Lake Emma Township, Lake George Township, Lake Hattie Township, Lakeport Township, Laporte, Rockwood Township, Schoolcraft Township, Steamboat River Township, Thorpe Township

Isanti County (17)

All 17 townships and municipalities

Itasca County (57)

All 57 townships and municipalities

Kanabec County (20)

All 20 townships and municipalities

Mahnomen County (19)

All 19 townships and municipalities

Koochiching County (6)

All 6 townships and municipalities

Lake County (8)

All 8 townships and municipalities

Lake of the Woods County (35)

All 35 townships and municipalities

Mille Lacs County (25)

All 25 townships and municipalities

Pine County (47)

All 47 townships and municipalities

St. Louis County (101)

All 101 townships and municipalities

Washington County (6)

Hugo, Forest Lake, Marine on St. Croix, May Township, Scandia, Stillwater Township (pat; also 4th)

== Demographics ==
The district is mostly rural (61.5%), covering over 27,500 square miles, with a density of around 23 people per square mile. Major industries include health care, retail, and manufacturing, though employment in traditional sectors like taconite mining has declined from 15,000 jobs in the 1970s to about 4,300 today. The district has aged, with median ages in many counties exceeding 40, and education levels have risen, with over 25% of adults in some counties holding bachelor's degrees by 2012. Homeownership is high at 78.3%.

=== Sex ===
- Male 50.5%
- Female 49.5%

=== Ethnicity ===
Minnesota's 8th district has one of the highest proportions of non-Hispanic whites in the nation. 98.4% of people over the age of 85 are non-Hispanic whites. 86% of those in the 0-4 year old bracket are non-Hispanic white, compared to less than 50% of the nation at large.

- White 92.1%
- Hispanic 1.6%
- Black 1.0%
- Asian 0.7%
- More than one race 2.0%
- Other race 2.6%

=== Ancestry ===
The ancestry of Minnesota's 8th district is dominated by Northern Europeans: German Americans, Norwegian Americans, Swedish Americans, and Danish Americans make up over 55% of the population. Minnesota's 8th district has the highest percentage of Swedish Americans of any congressional district in the country.

- American 3.46%
- Arab 0.18%
- Czech 1.44%
- Danish 1.12%
- Dutch 1.51%
- English 5.91%
- French (except Basque) 3.62%
- French Canadian 1.60%
- German 29.47%
- Greek 0.12%
- Hungarian 0.24%
- Irish 9.09%
- Italian 2.91%
- Lithuanian 0.05%
- Norwegian 14.18%
- Polish 0.02%
- Portuguese 0.36%
- Russian 0.36%
- Scotch-Irish 0.47%
- Scottish 1.12%
- Slovak 0.08%
- Subsaharan African 0.45%
- Swedish 11.19%
- Swiss 0.30%
- Ukrainian 0.27%
- Welsh 0.34%
- West Indian 0.08%

=== Place of birth ===
- Born in United States 97.8%
  - State of residence 78.5%
  - Different state 19.1%
- Born in Puerto Rico, U.S. Island areas, or born abroad to American parent(s) 0.4%
- Foreign born 1.9%

=== Language ===
==== Language spoken at home other than English ====
- Spanish 1.0%
- German 0.4%
- Native American languages 0.4%
- French 0.1%
- Chinese 0.1%

== List of members representing the district ==
Member	Party	Years	Cong ress	Electoral history
District created March 4, 1903
James Bede (Pine City)	Republican	March 4, 1903 – March 3, 1909	58th 59th 60th	Elected in 1902. Re-elected in 1904. Re-elected in 1906. Lost renomination.
Clarence B. Miller (Duluth)	Republican	March 4, 1909 – March 3, 1919	61st 62nd 63rd 64th 65th	Elected in 1908. Re-elected in 1910. Re-elected in 1912. Re-elected in 1914. Re-elected in 1916. Lost re-election.
William Leighton Carss (Proctor)	Farmer–Labor	March 4, 1919 – March 3, 1921	66th	Elected in 1918. Lost re-election as a Democrat.
William Leighton Carss (Proctor)	Democratic	March 4, 1919 – March 3, 1921	66th	Elected in 1918. Lost re-election as a Democrat.
Oscar Larson (Duluth)	Republican	March 4, 1921 – March 3, 1925	67th 68th	Elected in 1920. Re-elected in 1922. Retired.
William Leighton Carss (Proctor)	Farmer–Labor	March 4, 1925 – March 3, 1929	69th 70th	Elected in 1924. Re-elected in 1926. Lost re-election.
William Alvin Pittenger (Duluth)	Republican	March 4, 1929 – March 3, 1933	71st 72nd	Elected in 1928. Re-elected in 1930. Redistricted to the at-large district and lost re-election.
District inactive		March 4, 1933 – January 3, 1935	73rd	All members elected At-large on a general ticket
William Alvin Pittenger (Duluth)	Republican	January 3, 1935 – January 3, 1937	74th	Elected in 1934. Lost re-election.
John Bernard (Eveleth)	Farmer–Labor	January 3, 1937 – January 3, 1939	75th	Elected in 1936. Lost re-election.
William Alvin Pittenger (Duluth)	Republican	January 3, 1939 – January 3, 1947	76th 77th 78th 79th	Elected in 1938. Re-elected in 1940. Re-elected in 1942. Re-elected in 1944. Lost re-election.
John Blatnik (Chisholm)	Democratic (DFL)	January 3, 1947 – December 31, 1974	80th 81st 82nd 83rd 84th 85th 86th 87th 88th 89th 90th 91st 92nd 93rd	Elected in 1946. Re-elected in 1948. Re-elected in 1950. Re-elected in 1952. Re-elected in 1954. Re-elected in 1956. Re-elected in 1958. Re-elected in 1960. Re-elected in 1962. Re-elected in 1964. Re-elected in 1966. Re-elected in 1968. Re-elected in 1970. Re-elected in 1972. Retired and resigned early.
Vacant		December 31, 1974 – January 3, 1975	93rd	
Jim Oberstar (Chisholm)	Democratic (DFL)	January 3, 1975 – January 3, 2011	94th 95th 96th 97th 98th 99th 100th 101st 102nd 103rd 104th 105th 106th 107th 108th 109th 110th 111th	Elected in 1974. Re-elected in 1976. Re-elected in 1978. Re-elected in 1980. Re-elected in 1982. Re-elected in 1984. Re-elected in 1986. Re-elected in 1988. Re-elected in 1990. Re-elected in 1992. Re-elected in 1994. Re-elected in 1996. Re-elected in 1998. Re-elected in 2000. Re-elected in 2002. Re-elected in 2004. Re-elected in 2006. Re-elected in 2008. Lost re-election.
Chip Cravaack (Lindström)	Republican	January 3, 2011 – January 3, 2013	112th	Elected in 2010. Lost re-election.
Rick Nolan (Crosby)	Democratic (DFL)	January 3, 2013 – January 3, 2019	113th 114th 115th	Elected in 2012. Re-elected in 2014. Re-elected in 2016. Retired to run for Lt. Governor of Minnesota.
Pete Stauber (Hermantown)	Republican	January 3, 2019 – present	116th 117th 118th 119th	Elected in 2018. Re-elected in 2020. Re-elected in 2022. Re-elected in 2024. Re-elected in 2026.

== Recent election results ==
Vote share from 1982–2022

Year	DFL			Republican			Others		Total		Result
Year	Candidate	Votes	%	Candidate	Votes	%	Votes	%	Votes	%	Result
2002	Jim Oberstar	193,959	68.6%	Bob Lemen	88,423	31.2%	349 (Note: Write-in: 349)	0.1%	283,931	100.0%	DFL hold
2004	Jim Oberstar	228,586	65.2%	Mark Groettum	112,693	32.2%	9,204 (Note: Van Presley (Green): 8,933 Write-in: 271)	2.6%	350,483	100.0%	DFL hold
2006	Jim Oberstar	180,670	63.6%	Rod Grams	97,683	34.4%	5,663 (Note: Harry Welty (Unity): 5,508 Write-in: 155)	2.0%	284,016	100.0%	DFL hold
2008	Jim Oberstar	241,831	67.7%	Michael Cummins	114,871	32.2%	582 (Note: Write-in: 582)	0.2%	357,284	100.0%	DFL hold
2010	Jim Oberstar	129,091	46.6%	Chip Cravaack	133,490	48.2%	14,500 (Note: Timothy Olson (IPM): 11,876 Richard Burton (Constitution): 2,492 Write-in: 132)	5.2%	277,081	100.0%	Republican gain
2012	Rick Nolan	191,976	54.3%	Chip Cravaack	160,520	45.4%	1,167	0.3%	353,663	100.0%	DFL gain
2014	Rick Nolan	129,090	48.5%	Stewart Mills III	125,358	47.1%	11,635	4.4%	266,083	100.0%	DFL hold
2016	Rick Nolan	179,098	50.2%	Stewart Mills III	177,089	49.6%	792	0.2%	356,979	100.0%	DFL hold
2018	Joe Radinovich	141,948	45.2%	Pete Stauber	159,364	50.7%	12,697	4.1%	314,209	100.0%	Republican gain
2020	Quinn Nystrom	147,853	37.6%	Pete Stauber	223,432	56.7%	22,426	5.7%	393,711	100.0%	Republican hold
2022	Jennifer Schultz	140,770	42.7%	Pete Stauber	188,444	57.2%	317	0.1%	329,531	100.0%	Republican hold
2024	Jennifer Schultz	176,724	41.9%	Pete Stauber	244,498	58.0%	384	0.1%	421,222	100.0%	Republican hold

== Recent election results from statewide races ==
Year	Office	Results
2008	President	Obama 54% - 44%
2008	Senate	Franken 44% - 40%
2010	Governor	Dayton 48% - 40%
2010	Secretary of State	Ritchie 51% - 43%
2010	Auditor	Otto 50% - 45%
2010	Attorney General	Swanson 55% - 39%
2012	President	Obama 52% - 45%
2012	Senate	Klobuchar 66% - 30%
2014	Senate	Franken 54% - 42%
2014	Governor	Dayton 51% - 43%
2014	Secretary of State	Simon 48% - 44%
2014	Auditor	Otto 52% - 39%
2014	Attorney General	Swanson 54% - 38%
2016	President	Trump 52% - 40%
2018	Senate (Reg.)	Klobuchar 55% - 42%
2018	Senate (Spec.)	Housley 48% - 47%
2018	Governor	Johnson 49% - 47%
2018	Secretary of State	Howe 49% - 47%
2018	Auditor	Myhra 48% - 45%
2018	Attorney General	Wardlow 50% - 44%
2020	President	Trump 55% - 43%
2020	Senate	Lewis 51% - 41%
2022	Governor	Jensen 52% - 44%
2022	Secretary of State	Crockett 53% - 46%
2022	Auditor	Wilson 54% - 40%
2022	Attorney General	Schultz 57% - 42%
2024	President	Trump 56% - 42%
2024	Senate	White 49% - 48%
2026	Senate	Tafoya 53% - 44%
2026	Governor	Demuth 53% - 46%
2026	Secretary of State	Jude 51% - 45%
2026	Auditor	Jensen 53% - 44%
2026	Attorney General	Schutz 55% - 45%

== Historical district boundaries ==
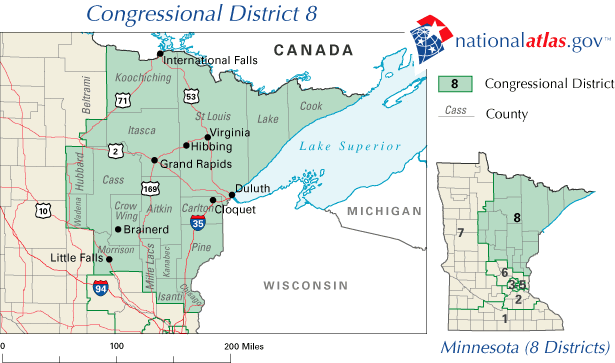
2003–2013

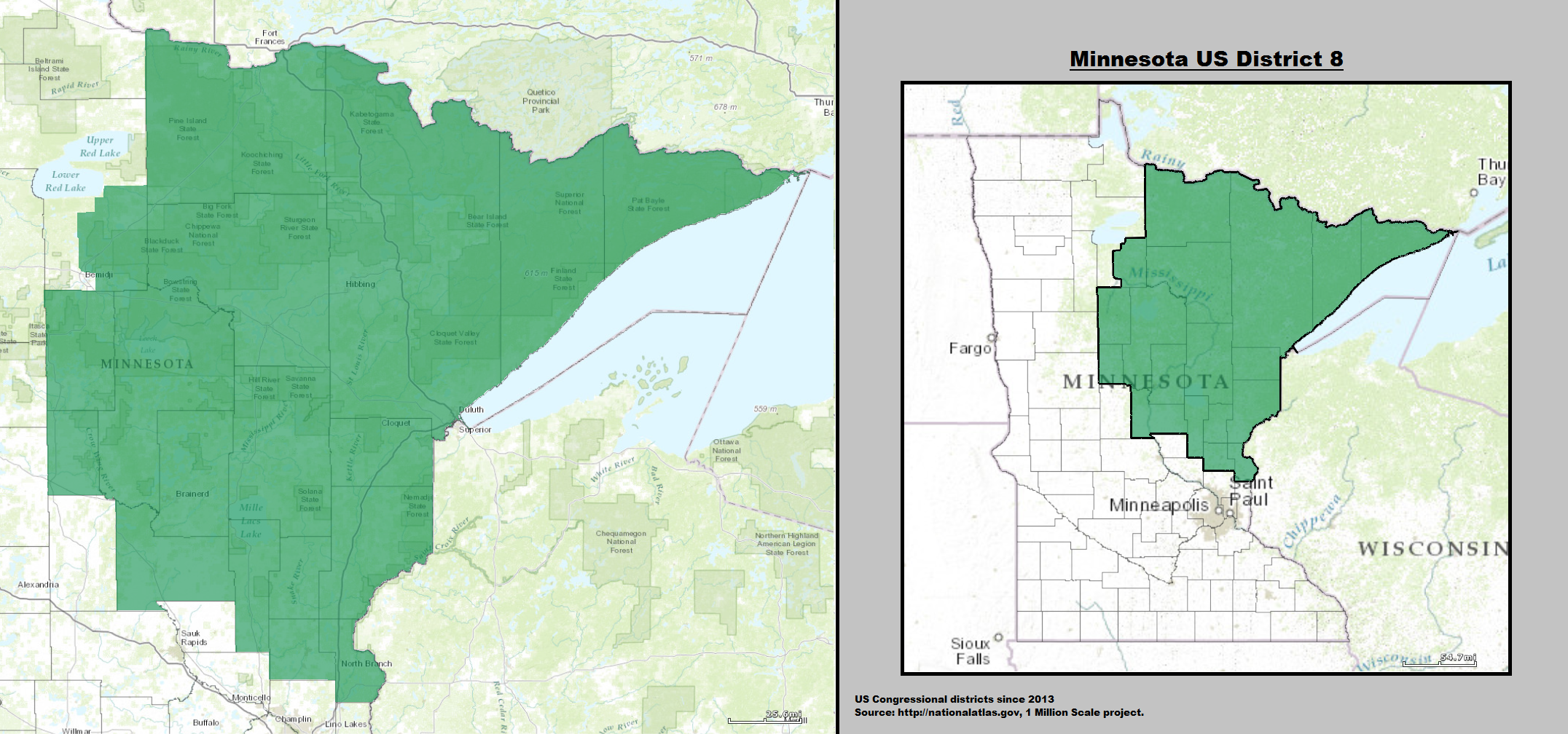
2013–2023

== See also ==
- Minnesota's congressional districts
- List of United States congressional districts
