= Nary =

Nary may refer to:

- Cornelius Nary (1660–1738), Irish priest and religious writer
- Nary, Minnesota
- Nary relation, in set theory

== See also ==
- McNary (disambiguation)
- McNary (surname)
- Nari (disambiguation)
