= Lake George =

Lake George may refer to:

== Communities ==
=== Australia ===
- Lake George, New South Wales, a locality

=== Canada ===
- Lake George, Kings County, Nova Scotia, a community
- Lake George, Yarmouth County, Nova Scotia
- Lake George, New Brunswick, a community

=== United States ===
- Lake George, Colorado, a town
- Lake George, Michigan, an unincorporated community
- Lake George Township, Hubbard County, Minnesota
  - Lake George, Minnesota, an unincorporated community and census-designated place in the township
- Lake George Township, Stearns County, Minnesota
- Lake George (town), New York, a town
  - Lake George (village), New York, a village in the town

== Lakes ==
=== Australia ===
- Lake George (New South Wales)
- Lake George (South Australia)

=== Canada ===
- Lake George (New Brunswick)
- Lake George (Kings County, Nova Scotia)
- Lake George (Michigan–Ontario)

=== Uganda ===
- Lake George (Uganda)

=== United States ===
- Lake George (Alaska), a United States National Natural Landmark
- Lake George (Arkansas), a lake in Conway County, Arkansas
- Lake George (Colorado), a lake in Colorado
- Lake George (Florida)
- Lake George (Indiana) (disambiguation)
- Lake George (Anoka County, Minnesota)
- Lake George (Cass County, Minnesota)
- Lake George (Hubbard County, Minnesota)
- Lake George (lake), New York

== See also ==
- George Lake (disambiguation)
