= Emmaville, Minnesota =

Unincorporated community in Minnesota, United States

Emmaville
- Unincorporated community
- Location within Minnesota Location within the United States
- Coordinates: 47°03′56″N 94°58′50″W
- Country: United States
- State: Minnesota
- County: Hubbard
- Townships: Lake Emma, Clay
- Elevation: 1,555 ft (474 m)
- Time zone: UTC-6 (Central (CST))
  - Summer (DST): UTC-5 (CDT)
- ZIP code: 56470
- Area code: 218
- GNIS feature ID: 654692

Emmaville is an unincorporated community in Hubbard County, Minnesota, United States, halfway between Park Rapids and Lake George. The small community is located at the junction of Hubbard County Roads 4 and 24, within Clay Township and Lake Emma Township. Through the years, population estimates have been listed between 4 and 29.

The one big local business establishment is the Emmaville Store. It includes a gas station, convenience store, café, and tavern. There is also a small motel, along with camping sites. It is well traveled by snowmobilers in the winter, because of its location near the trails, including the Heartland State Trail. It is well known as the last stop before entering Camp Wilderness, a Boy Scout summer camp.

On June 6, 2008, Emmaville was the scene of widespread damage, along with nearby Park Rapids, when a storm system containing at least one tornado swept through the area, uprooting trees and damaging property. One injury was reported.

In 2010, the Emmaville Store was officially put up for sale and purchased by new owners. The entire complex was renovated and reopened in the spring of 2011.
