= Benedict, Minnesota =

Unincorporated community in Minnesota, United States

Benedict
- Unincorporated community
- Location within Minnesota Location within the United States
- Coordinates: 47°09′29″N 94°41′26″W
- Country: United States
- State: Minnesota
- County: Hubbard
- Township: Lakeport
- Elevation: 1,319 ft (402 m)
- Time zone: UTC-6 (Central (CST))
  - Summer (DST): UTC-5 (CDT)
- ZIP code: 56436 and 56461
- Area code: 218
- GNIS feature ID: 655332

Benedict is an unincorporated community in Lakeport Township, Hubbard County, Minnesota, United States.

The community is located along State Highway 200 (MN 200) near Laporte and Walker. Benedict is five miles southeast of Laporte.

A post office called Benedict was established in 1907, and remained in operation until it was discontinued in 1995. The community was named for an early settler.
