= Two Inlets Township, Becker County, Minnesota =

Two Inlets Township, Minnesota
- Township
- Location of Two Inlets Township, within Becker County, Minnesota

- Location within the state of Minnesota Two Inlets Township, Minnesota (the United States)
- Coordinates: 47°1′41″N 95°12′30″W
- Country: United States
- State: Minnesota
- County: Becker

Area
  - Total: 35.9 sq mi (93.1 km^{2})
  - Land: 34.1 sq mi (88.2 km^{2})
  - Water: 1.9 sq mi (4.9 km^{2})
- Elevation: 1,512 ft (461 m)

Population (2020)
  - Total: 208
  - Density: 6.11/sq mi (2.36/km^{2})
- Time zone: UTC-6 (Central (CST))
  - Summer (DST): UTC-5 (CDT)
- FIPS code: 27-66010
- GNIS feature ID: 0665828

Two Inlets Township is a township in Becker County, Minnesota, United States. The population was 208 as of the 2020 census.

== History ==
Two Inlets Township was organized in 1898. It took its name from Two Inlets Lake.

== Geography ==
According to the United States Census Bureau, the township has a total area of 35.9 square miles (93.1 km^{2}), of which 34.1 square miles (88.2 km^{2}) is land and 1.9 square miles (4.9 km^{2}) (5.23%) is water.

=== Lakes ===
- Big Tom Lake
- Boot Lake (southeast quarter)
- Coleman Lake
- Duck Lake
- Fools Lake
- Horseshoe Lake
- Hungry Man Lakes (southwest half)
- Hungry Man Lakes (southwest three-quarters)
- Knights Lake
- Little Mud Lake
- Long Lake
- Mud Lake
- One Acre Lake
- Small Lake
- Stump Lake
- Ten Acre Lake
- Two Inlets Lake
- Wapsi Lake

=== Adjacent townships ===
- Savannah Township (north)
- Clover Township, Hubbard County (northeast)
- Arago Township, Hubbard County (east)
- Osage Township (south)
- Carsonville Township (southwest)
- Pine Point Township (west)
- Forest Township (northwest)

=== Cemeteries ===
The township contains Saint Mary's Catholic Cemetery.

== Demographics ==
As of the census of 2000, there were 237 people, 89 households, and 67 families residing in the township. The population density was 7.0 people per square mile (2.7/km^{2}). There were 156 housing units at an average density of 4.6/sq mi (1.8/km^{2}). The racial makeup of the township was 97.47% White, 1.69% Native American and 0.84% Asian.

There were 89 households, out of which 33.7% had children under the age of 18 living with them, 71.9% were married couples living together, 2.2% had a female householder with no husband present, and 23.6% were non-families. 20.2% of all households were made up of individuals, and 12.4% had someone living alone who was 65 years of age or older. The average household size was 2.66 and the average family size was 3.09.

In the township the population was spread out, with 24.1% under the age of 18, 7.2% from 18 to 24, 25.3% from 25 to 44, 27.8% from 45 to 64, and 15.6% who were 65 years of age or older. The median age was 40 years. For every 100 females, there were 134.7 males. For every 100 females age 18 and over, there were 122.2 males.

The median income for a household in the township was $31,429, and the median income for a family was $35,357. Males had a median income of $20,250 versus $16,111 for females. The per capita income for the township was $15,946. About 6.0% of families and 3.1% of the population were below the poverty line, including none of those under the age of eighteen and 8.6% of those 65 or over.
