= Savannah Township, Becker County, Minnesota =

Savannah Township, Minnesota
- Township
- Location of Savannah Township, within Becker County, Minnesota

- Location within the state of Minnesota Savannah Township, Minnesota (the United States)
- Coordinates: 47°6′32″N 95°12′42″W
- Country: United States
- State: Minnesota
- County: Becker

Area
  - Total: 36.6 sq mi (94.7 km^{2})
  - Land: 34.3 sq mi (88.9 km^{2})
  - Water: 2.2 sq mi (5.8 km^{2})
- Elevation: 1,565 ft (477 m)

Population (2020)
  - Total: 178
  - Density: 5.19/sq mi (2.00/km^{2})
- Time zone: UTC-6 (Central (CST))
  - Summer (DST): UTC-5 (CDT)
- FIPS code: 27-58756
- GNIS feature ID: 0665562

Savannah Township is a township in Becker County, Minnesota, United States. The population was 178 as of the 2020 census.

Savannah Township was organized in 1901.

== Geography ==
According to the United States Census Bureau, the township has a total area of 36.5 square miles (94.7 km^{2}), of which 34.3 square miles (88.9 km^{2}) is land and 2.2 square miles (5.7 km^{2}) (6.07%) is water.

=== Major highway ===
- Minnesota State Highway 113

=== Lakes ===
- Abners Lake
- Augusta Lake
- Boot Lake (northeast three-quarters)
- Cedar Lake
- Coon Lake
- Dinner Lake
- Gilfillan Lake
- Hemphill Lake
- Hernando De Soto Lake
- Horn Lake
- Hungry Man Lakes (northwest half)
- Hungry Man Lakes (northwest quarter)
- Iron Corner Lake
- Lashbrook Lake
- Little Dinner Lake
- Little Mantrap Lake
- Lake Frazier
- Mc Kenna Lake
- Morrison Lake
- Mud Lake
- Twin Island Lake

=== Adjacent townships ===
- Lake Alice Township, Hubbard County (northeast)
- Clover Township, Hubbard County (east)
- Arago Township, Hubbard County (southeast)
- Two Inlets Township (south)
- Pine Point Township (southwest)
- Forest Township (west)
- Long Lost Lake Township, Clearwater County (northwest)

=== Cemeteries ===
The township contains Lakeside Cemetery.

== Demographics ==
As of the census of 2000, there were 162 people, 58 households, and 48 families residing in the township. The population density was 4.7 people per square mile (1.8/km^{2}). There were 106 housing units at an average density of 3.1/sq mi (1.2/km^{2}). The racial makeup of the township was 99.38% White, and 0.62% from two or more races.

There were 58 households, out of which 29.3% had children under the age of 18 living with them, 79.3% were married couples living together, 3.4% had a female householder with no husband present, and 17.2% were non-families. 13.8% of all households were made up of individuals, and 5.2% had someone living alone who was 65 years of age or older. The average household size was 2.79 and the average family size was 3.10.

In the township the population was spread out, with 29.6% under the age of 18, 4.9% from 18 to 24, 21.0% from 25 to 44, 30.9% from 45 to 64, and 13.6% who were 65 years of age or older. The median age was 41 years. For every 100 females, there were 107.7 males. For every 100 females age 18 and over, there were 90.0 males.

The median income for a household in the township was $32,813, and the median income for a family was $31,667. Males had a median income of $33,750 versus $10,417 for females. The per capita income for the township was $13,880. About 14.6% of families and 20.4% of the population were below the poverty line, including 42.9% of those under the age of eighteen and none of those 65 or over.
