= Schoolcraft Township =

Schoolcraft Township may refer to:

Places in the United States:

- Schoolcraft Township, Houghton County, Michigan
- Schoolcraft Township, Kalamazoo County, Michigan
- Schoolcraft Township, Hubbard County, Minnesota
