= Emmaville =

Emmaville may refer to:

- Emmaville, Minnesota, United States
- Emmaville, New South Wales, Australia
