= 1976 United States presidential election in Minnesota =

- November 2, 1976
- Turnout: 73.01% ▲

Nominee	Jimmy Carter	Gerald Ford
Party	Democratic (DFL)	Ind.-Republican
Home state	Georgia	Michigan
Running mate	Walter Mondale	Bob Dole
Electoral vote	10	0
Popular vote	1,070,440	819,395
Percentage	54.90%	42.02%
County results
Carter
40–50%
50–60%
60–70%
Ford
40–50%
50–60%
60–70%
President before election
Gerald Ford
Republican
Elected President
Jimmy Carter
Democratic

The 1976 United States presidential election in Minnesota took place on November 2, 1976, as part of the 1976 United States presidential election. Voters chose ten electors, or representatives to the Electoral College, who voted for president and vice president.

Minnesota was won by the Democratic Party candidate, former Georgia Governor Jimmy Carter, won the state over incumbent President Gerald Ford by a landslide margin of 251,045 votes, or approximately 12.88%. Carter went on to win the election nationally, as the country's confidence in the Republican Party had been deeply shaken following the Watergate scandal and the subsequent resignation of Richard Nixon.

Prior to the election, Minnesota was considered as leaning-Carter. The Republican Party of Minnesota had been terribly weakened by the Watergate scandal. That weakened position was further eroded when Jimmy Carter chose Minnesota senator Walter Mondale as his vice-presidential running mate, securing the state for Carter. Mondale later went on to become the Democratic Party nominee for President in 1984, in which he only won one state, Minnesota.

The effect of Watergate on the political landscape in Minnesota can be clearly seen in the results of this election, as well as the landslide DFL victory in the 1974 gubernatorial election. Previously Minnesota had cast its electoral votes for the Republican nominee in twenty of the twenty-nine presidential elections from 1860 to 1972.

As of the 2024 presidential election, Minnesota has not cast a single electoral vote in favor of a Republican since 1972, making it the state with the longest Democratic streak up to the present day. As of the 2024 presidential election, this is the last election in which Roseau County, Wilkin County, Douglas County, Wadena County, and Pipestone County voted for a Democratic presidential candidate.

== Results ==
1976 United States presidential election in Minnesota
Party	Candidate	Votes	Percentage	Electoral votes
Democratic (DFL)	Jimmy Carter	1,070,440	54.90%	10
Republican	Gerald Ford (incumbent)	819,395	42.02%	0
McCarthy ‘76	Eugene McCarthy	35,490	1.82%	0
American	Thomas J. Anderson	13,592	0.70%	0
Socialist Workers	Peter Camejo	4,149	0.21%	0
Libertarian	Roger MacBride	3,529	0.18%	0
Communist	Gus Hall	1,092	0.06%	0
People's	Margaret Wright	635	0.03%	0
U.S. Labor	Lyndon LaRouche	543	0.03%	0
Socialist Labor	Julius Levin	370	0.02%	0
Socialist	Frank Zeidler	354	0.02%	0
Write-ins	Write-ins	342	0.02%	0
Invalid or blank votes				—
Totals		1,978,590	100.00%	10
Voter turnout		77%		—

=== Results by county ===
County	Jimmy Carter DFL		Gerald Ford Republican		Eugene McCarthy Independent		Thomas Anderson American		Various candidates Other parties		Margin		Total votes cast
County	#	%	#	%	#	%	#	%	#	%	#	%	Total votes cast
Aitkin	4,308	61.99%	2,476	35.63%	109	1.57%	26	0.37%	30	0.43%	1,832	26.36%	6,949
Anoka	48,173	61.51%	27,863	35.58%	1,298	1.66%	472	0.60%	509	0.65%	20,310	25.93%	78,315
Becker	6,597	52.50%	5,611	44.65%	215	1.71%	104	0.83%	39	0.31%	986	7.85%	12,566
Beltrami	7,540	56.76%	5,214	39.25%	289	2.18%	175	1.32%	67	0.50%	2,326	17.51%	13,285
Benton	6,235	56.86%	4,099	37.38%	285	2.60%	271	2.47%	75	0.68%	2,136	19.48%	10,965
Big Stone	2,581	64.41%	1,332	33.24%	45	1.12%	42	1.05%	7	0.17%	1,249	31.17%	4,007
Blue Earth	12,930	50.33%	11,998	46.71%	582	2.27%	91	0.35%	87	0.34%	932	3.62%	25,688
Brown	5,792	41.26%	7,479	53.27%	330	2.35%	409	2.91%	29	0.21%	-1,687	-12.01%	14,039
Carlton	9,247	66.28%	4,371	31.33%	239	1.71%	29	0.21%	66	0.47%	4,876	34.95%	13,952
Carver	7,574	46.33%	8,199	50.16%	336	2.06%	201	1.23%	37	0.23%	-625	-3.83%	16,347
Cass	5,424	53.00%	4,443	43.41%	173	1.69%	159	1.55%	35	0.34%	981	9.59%	10,234
Chippewa	4,648	57.77%	3,254	40.44%	75	0.93%	56	0.70%	13	0.16%	1,394	17.33%	8,046
Chisago	6,625	60.96%	3,874	35.65%	185	1.70%	142	1.31%	41	0.38%	2,751	25.31%	10,867
Clay	10,876	50.10%	10,317	47.53%	319	1.47%	62	0.29%	134	0.62%	559	2.57%	21,708
Clearwater	2,437	60.70%	1,374	34.22%	57	1.42%	115	2.86%	32	0.80%	1,063	26.48%	4,015
Cook	1,018	47.79%	1,034	48.54%	41	1.92%	27	1.27%	10	0.47%	-16	-0.75%	2,130
Cottonwood	3,813	48.52%	3,906	49.70%	85	1.08%	46	0.59%	9	0.11%	-93	-1.18%	7,859
Crow Wing	10,653	54.45%	8,072	41.26%	284	1.45%	447	2.28%	108	0.55%	2,581	13.19%	19,564
Dakota	44,253	52.63%	37,542	44.65%	1,500	1.78%	400	0.48%	385	0.46%	6,711	7.98%	84,080
Dodge	3,009	45.60%	3,446	52.23%	67	1.02%	64	0.97%	12	0.18%	-437	-6.63%	6,598
Douglas	7,097	53.30%	5,910	44.38%	138	1.04%	143	1.07%	28	0.21%	1,187	8.92%	13,316
Faribault	5,049	46.61%	5,577	51.48%	118	1.09%	68	0.63%	21	0.19%	-528	-4.87%	10,833
Fillmore	4,758	43.42%	5,984	54.61%	135	1.23%	63	0.57%	17	0.16%	-1,226	-11.19%	10,957
Freeborn	9,470	52.56%	8,220	45.62%	207	1.15%	61	0.34%	60	0.33%	1,250	6.94%	18,018
Goodhue	8,926	46.20%	9,967	51.59%	271	1.40%	108	0.56%	49	0.25%	-1,041	-5.39%	19,321
Grant	2,624	60.49%	1,635	37.69%	57	1.31%	14	0.32%	8	0.18%	989	22.80%	4,338
Hennepin	257,380	53.25%	211,892	43.84%	9,376	1.94%	1,716	0.36%	3,014	0.62%	45,488	9.41%	483,378
Houston	3,861	43.26%	4,853	54.37%	137	1.53%	53	0.59%	22	0.25%	-992	-11.11%	8,926
Hubbard	3,196	49.25%	2,985	46.00%	134	2.07%	162	2.50%	12	0.18%	211	3.25%	6,489
Isanti	6,013	63.85%	3,159	33.55%	135	1.43%	84	0.89%	26	0.28%	2,854	30.30%	9,417
Itasca	12,979	64.00%	6,646	32.77%	378	1.86%	155	0.76%	123	0.61%	6,333	31.23%	20,281
Jackson	4,311	59.16%	2,870	39.39%	82	1.13%	13	0.18%	11	0.15%	1,441	19.77%	7,287
Kanabec	3,188	60.03%	1,943	36.58%	78	1.47%	93	1.75%	9	0.17%	1,245	23.45%	5,311
Kandiyohi	9,992	58.33%	6,664	38.90%	254	1.48%	170	0.99%	50	0.29%	3,328	19.43%	17,130
Kittson	2,008	55.33%	1,555	42.85%	41	1.13%	13	0.36%	12	0.33%	453	12.48%	3,629
Koochiching	4,846	60.52%	2,893	36.13%	167	2.09%	67	0.84%	34	0.42%	1,953	24.39%	8,007
Lac qui Parle	3,647	60.13%	2,292	37.79%	58	0.96%	60	0.99%	8	0.13%	1,355	22.34%	6,065
Lake	2,973	53.10%	2,313	41.31%	158	2.82%	132	2.36%	23	0.41%	660	11.79%	5,599
Lake of the Woods	1,105	56.23%	757	38.52%	35	1.78%	52	2.65%	16	0.81%	348	17.71%	1,965
Le Sueur	6,556	57.60%	4,565	40.11%	143	1.26%	75	0.66%	42	0.37%	1,991	17.49%	11,381
Lincoln	2,594	60.79%	1,599	37.47%	40	0.94%	31	0.73%	3	0.07%	995	23.32%	4,267
Lyon	7,122	57.17%	5,036	40.42%	178	1.43%	74	0.59%	48	0.39%	2,086	16.75%	12,458
Mahnomen	1,590	60.85%	905	34.63%	70	2.68%	37	1.42%	11	0.42%	685	26.22%	2,613
Marshall	3,744	57.70%	2,605	40.14%	78	1.20%	45	0.69%	17	0.26%	1,139	17.56%	6,489
Martin	5,672	45.42%	6,484	51.92%	160	1.28%	155	1.24%	17	0.14%	-812	-6.50%	12,488
McLeod	6,249	47.21%	6,519	49.24%	198	1.50%	140	1.06%	132	1.00%	-270	-2.03%	13,238
Meeker	5,295	54.25%	4,097	41.97%	255	2.61%	89	0.91%	25	0.26%	1,198	12.28%	9,761
Mille Lacs	5,172	59.65%	3,212	37.05%	145	1.67%	105	1.21%	36	0.42%	1,960	22.60%	8,670
Morrison	8,176	61.50%	4,590	34.53%	256	1.93%	195	1.47%	77	0.58%	3,586	26.97%	13,294
Mower	12,837	59.74%	8,163	37.99%	290	1.35%	81	0.38%	116	0.54%	4,674	21.75%	21,487
Murray	3,685	57.59%	2,605	40.71%	86	1.34%	17	0.27%	6	0.09%	1,080	16.88%	6,399
Nicollet	5,777	47.18%	6,071	49.58%	258	2.11%	85	0.69%	54	0.44%	-294	-2.40%	12,245
Nobles	6,034	56.21%	4,503	41.95%	135	1.26%	42	0.39%	21	0.20%	1,531	14.26%	10,735
Norman	2,946	58.78%	1,983	39.57%	47	0.94%	20	0.40%	16	0.32%	963	19.21%	5,012
Olmsted	14,676	37.02%	24,060	60.69%	487	1.23%	329	0.83%	95	0.24%	-9,384	-23.67%	39,647
Otter Tail	11,881	48.47%	12,113	49.42%	312	1.27%	117	0.48%	87	0.35%	-232	-0.95%	24,510
Pennington	3,787	54.50%	3,023	43.51%	58	0.83%	62	0.89%	18	0.26%	764	10.99%	6,948
Pine	5,442	61.24%	3,057	34.40%	170	1.91%	182	2.05%	36	0.41%	2,385	26.84%	8,887
Pipestone	3,272	51.12%	3,018	47.15%	87	1.36%	19	0.30%	5	0.08%	254	3.97%	6,401
Polk	9,078	56.62%	6,552	40.86%	190	1.18%	163	1.02%	51	0.32%	2,526	15.76%	16,034
Pope	3,746	61.14%	2,251	36.74%	58	0.95%	61	1.00%	11	0.18%	1,495	24.40%	6,127
Ramsey	133,682	58.62%	86,480	37.92%	4,908	2.15%	970	0.43%	2,027	0.89%	47,202	20.70%	228,067
Red Lake	1,748	67.23%	737	28.35%	42	1.62%	59	2.27%	14	0.54%	1,011	38.88%	2,600
Redwood	4,525	46.07%	4,926	50.15%	151	1.54%	200	2.04%	20	0.20%	-401	-4.08%	9,822
Renville	5,762	54.64%	4,482	42.50%	166	1.57%	116	1.10%	19	0.18%	1,280	12.14%	10,545
Rice	10,590	54.01%	8,311	42.39%	419	2.14%	112	0.57%	175	0.89%	2,279	11.62%	19,607
Rock	2,769	48.25%	2,892	50.39%	47	0.82%	15	0.26%	16	0.28%	-123	-2.14%	5,739
Roseau	3,215	55.90%	2,382	41.42%	50	0.87%	87	1.51%	17	0.30%	833	14.48%	5,751
St. Louis	75,040	65.78%	35,331	30.97%	2,256	1.98%	364	0.32%	1,084	0.95%	39,709	34.81%	114,075
Scott	9,912	56.34%	7,154	40.66%	336	1.91%	148	0.84%	43	0.24%	2,758	15.68%	17,593
Sherburne	6,678	58.36%	4,361	38.11%	234	2.05%	119	1.04%	50	0.44%	2,317	20.25%	11,442
Sibley	3,752	47.74%	3,871	49.25%	138	1.76%	84	1.07%	15	0.19%	-119	-1.51%	7,860
Stearns	25,027	52.33%	19,574	40.93%	1,612	3.37%	1,290	2.70%	318	0.66%	5,453	11.40%	47,821
Steele	6,263	45.89%	7,053	51.68%	174	1.28%	92	0.67%	65	0.48%	-790	-5.79%	13,647
Stevens	3,171	54.78%	2,484	42.91%	99	1.71%	17	0.29%	18	0.31%	687	11.87%	5,789
Swift	4,428	65.48%	2,190	32.39%	77	1.14%	51	0.75%	16	0.24%	2,238	33.09%	6,762
Todd	6,530	58.05%	4,278	38.03%	186	1.65%	200	1.78%	54	0.48%	2,252	20.02%	11,248
Traverse	2,020	62.99%	1,130	35.24%	41	1.28%	13	0.41%	3	0.09%	890	27.75%	3,207
Wabasha	4,286	47.36%	4,484	49.55%	174	1.92%	71	0.78%	34	0.38%	-198	-2.19%	9,049
Wadena	3,164	49.25%	3,048	47.45%	80	1.25%	110	1.71%	22	0.34%	116	1.80%	6,424
Waseca	4,002	45.45%	4,582	52.04%	141	1.60%	49	0.56%	31	0.35%	-580	-6.59%	8,805
Washington	26,454	54.45%	20,716	42.64%	892	1.84%	237	0.49%	284	0.58%	5,738	11.81%	48,583
Watonwan	3,177	47.69%	3,351	50.30%	79	1.19%	47	0.71%	8	0.12%	-174	-2.61%	6,662
Wilkin	2,103	51.17%	1,882	45.79%	88	2.14%	28	0.68%	9	0.22%	221	5.38%	4,110
Winona	10,939	49.92%	10,436	47.62%	420	1.92%	66	0.30%	53	0.24%	503	2.30%	21,914
Wright	13,379	57.02%	9,314	39.69%	410	1.75%	291	1.24%	70	0.30%	4,065	17.33%	23,464
Yellow Medicine	4,337	58.12%	2,946	39.48%	96	1.29%	67	0.90%	16	0.21%	1,391	18.64%	7,462
Totals	1,070,440	54.90%	819,395	42.02%	35,490	1.82%	13,592	0.70%	11,014	0.56%	251,045	12.88%	1,949,931

==== Counties that flipped from Republican to Democratic ====
- Aitkin
- Anoka
- Beltrami
- Becker
- Benton
- Blue Earth
- Chippewa
- Clay
- Cass
- Chisago
- Crow Wing
- Douglas
- Freeborn
- Grant
- Hennepin
- Hubbard
- Jackson
- Kittson
- Koochiching
- Lac qui Parle
- Le Sueur
- Lyon
- Marshall
- Meeker
- Murray
- Norman
- Pine
- Pennington
- Pipestone
- Red Lake
- Polk
- Renville
- Roseau
- Rice
- Todd
- Wadena
- Winona
- Wilkin
- Yellow Medicine
- Clearwater
- Dakota
- Isanti
- Kanabec
- Mille Lacs
- Morrison
- Scott
- Sherburne
- Washington
- Wright

=== By congressional district ===
Carter won all but one of the state's 8 congressional districts, including two which elected Republicans.

District	Carter	Ford	Representative
1st	51.7%	48.3%	Al Quie
2nd	50.4%	49.6%	Tom Hagedorn
3rd	49.1%	50.9%	Bill Frenzel
4th	60.8%	39.2%	Bruce Vento
5th	63.6%	36.4%	Donald M. Fraser
6th	57.3%	42.7%	Rick Nolan
7th	56.9%	43.1%	Bob Bergland
8th	65.9%	34.1%	Jim Oberstar

== See also ==
- United States presidential elections in Minnesota
