= Chamberlain, Minnesota =

Unincorporated community in Minnesota, United States

Chamberlain
- Unincorporated community
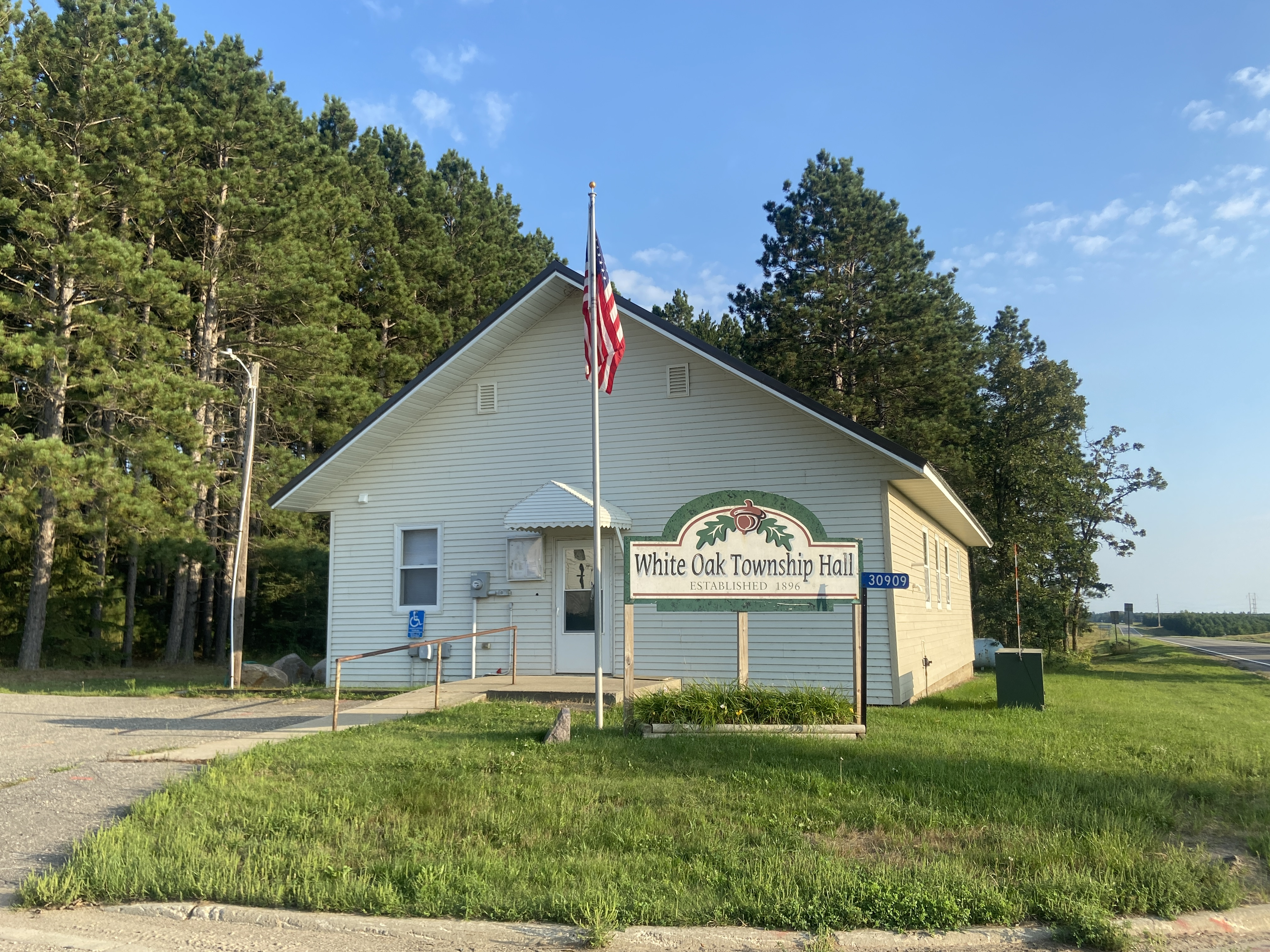
- White Oak Township Hall in Chamberlain

- Location within Minnesota Location within the United States
- Coordinates: 46°54′18″N 94°43′18″W
- Country: United States
- State: Minnesota
- County: Hubbard
- Township: White Oak
- Elevation: 1,470 ft (450 m)
- Time zone: UTC-6 (Central (CST))
  - Summer (DST): UTC-5 (CDT)
- ZIP code: 56433
- Area code: 218
- GNIS feature ID: 655694

Chamberlain is an unincorporated community in White Oak Township, Hubbard County, Minnesota, United States, near Akeley and Hackensack.

The community is along State Highway 64 (MN 64) near Hubbard County Road 119 and 170th Street. It is seven miles south of Akeley.
