= Lake George, New York =

Lake George, New York may refer to one of several locations in New York State in the United States:

- Lake George (lake), New York
- Lake George (town), New York
- Lake George (village), New York, which sits within the town of Lake George

== See also ==
- East Lake George, New York, a hamlet
- Lake George (disambiguation)
