= Arm (geography) =

Narrow extension of water extending from a larger body of water

Shuswap Lake in British Columbia with its three arms

In geography, an arm is a narrow extension, inlet, or smaller reach, of water flowing out from a much larger body of water, such as an ocean, a sea, or a lake. Although different geographically, a sound or bay may also be called an arm, or vice versa.

Both the tributary and distributary of a river are sometimes called an "arm". By extension, a canal arm is a subsidiary branch of a canal or inland waterway. A number of place names are derived from this term, such as Salmon Arm, Indian Arm and Alice Arm.

== See also ==
- Anabranch
- River
- Channel
- Gulf of Bothnia
- Lake George
