= 1996 United States presidential election in Minnesota =

- November 5, 1996
- Turnout: 66.61% (▼7.3 pp)

Nominee	Bill Clinton	Bob Dole	Ross Perot
Party	Democratic (DFL)	Republican	Reform
Home state	Arkansas	Kansas	Texas
Running mate	Al Gore	Jack Kemp	Pat Choate
Electoral vote	10	0	0
Popular vote	1,120,438	766,476	257,704
Percentage	51.10%	34.96%	11.75%
- Clinton 30–40% 40–50% 50–60% 60–70% 70–80% 80–90% 90–100% Dole 30–40% 40–50% 50–60% 60–70% 70–80% 80–90% 90–100% Perot 30–40% 40–50% 90–100% Other 50–60% 90–100% Tie/No Data
President before election
Bill Clinton
Democratic (DFL)
Elected President
Bill Clinton
Democratic (DFL)

The 1996 United States presidential election in Minnesota took place on November 5, 1996, as part of the 1996 United States presidential election. Voters chose ten representatives, or electors, to the Electoral College, who voted for president and vice president.

Incumbent Democratic President Bill Clinton comfortably won a Democratic-leaning state, Minnesota. Clinton took 51.10% of the popular vote over Republican challenger Bob Dole, who took 34.96%, a victory margin of 16.14%. Reform Party candidate Ross Perot finished in third, with 11.75% of the popular vote.

As of the 2024 presidential election, and despite the state's long Democratic streak – having not voted Republican since 1972 – this is the most recent election that the Republican candidate received less than forty percent of the vote in a presidential election, the most recent in which a Democrat would win the state by more than 15% of the vote, the most recent in which the Democratic candidate won more counties than the Republican, and the most recent when Anoka, Becker, Benton, Cass, Chisago, Clearwater, Cottonwood, Crow Wing, Dodge, Faribault, Goodhue, Hubbard, Isanti, Jackson, Kanabec, Kandiyohi, Lake of the Woods, Le Sueur, Lyon, Martin, McLeod, Meeker, Mille Lacs, Morrison, Nobles, Renville, Scott, Sherburne, Sibley, Stearns, Steele, Todd, Wabasha, Waseca, and Wright Counties voted for a Democratic presidential candidate.

As of 2024, this is the last presidential election in which the Democratic candidate won every single congressional district in Minnesota, and the last in which the Democratic candidate won a majority of the state's 87 counties.

== Results ==
1996 United States presidential election in Minnesota
Party	Candidate	Votes	Percentage	Electoral votes
Democratic (DFL)	Bill Clinton (incumbent)	1,120,438	51.10%	10
Republican	Bob Dole	766,476	34.96%	0
Reform	Ross Perot	257,704	11.75%	0
Green	Ralph Nader	24,908	1.14%	0
Libertarian	Harry Browne	8,271	0.38%	0
Grassroots	Dennis Peron	4,898	0.22%	0
U.S. Taxpayer	Howard Phillips	3,416	0.16%	0
Write-ins	Write-ins	2,903	0.13%	0
Natural Law	John Hagelin	1,808	0.08%	0
Ind. Grassroots	John Birrenback	787	0.04%	0
Socialist Workers	James Harris	684	0.03%	0
Socialist Equality	Jerome White	347	0.02%	0
Totals		2,192,640	100.0%	10

=== Results by county ===
County	Bill Clinton DFL		Bob Dole Republican		Ross Perot Reform		Ralph Nader Green		Various candidates Other parties		Margin		Total votes cast
County	#	%	#	%	#	%	#	%	#	%	#	%	Total votes cast
Aitkin	3,810	51.46%	2,327	31.43%	1,155	15.60%	48	0.65%	64	0.86%	1,483	20.03%	7,404
Anoka	63,756	51.41%	41,745	33.66%	16,448	13.26%	724	0.58%	1,349	1.09%	22,011	17.75%	124,022
Becker	5,911	44.20%	5,461	40.83%	1,813	13.56%	107	0.80%	82	0.61%	450	3.37%	13,374
Beltrami	8,006	50.52%	5,806	36.64%	1,635	10.32%	246	1.55%	155	0.98%	2,200	13.88%	15,848
Benton	6,006	45.39%	4,835	36.54%	2,133	16.12%	81	0.61%	178	1.35%	1,171	8.85%	13,233
Big Stone	1,619	53.95%	990	32.99%	368	12.26%	7	0.23%	17	0.57%	629	20.96%	3,001
Blue Earth	12,420	49.17%	9,082	35.95%	3,324	13.16%	190	0.75%	245	0.97%	3,338	13.22%	25,261
Brown	4,864	39.36%	5,580	45.15%	1,786	14.45%	40	0.32%	89	0.72%	-716	-5.79%	12,359
Carlton	8,052	57.87%	4,034	28.99%	1,591	11.43%	115	0.83%	123	0.88%	4,018	28.88%	13,915
Carver	11,554	41.02%	12,380	43.95%	3,781	13.42%	163	0.58%	290	1.03%	-826	-2.93%	28,168
Cass	5,437	45.20%	4,791	39.83%	1,620	13.47%	109	0.91%	72	0.60%	646	5.37%	12,029
Chippewa	3,178	51.89%	2,119	34.60%	782	12.77%	20	0.33%	25	0.41%	1,059	17.29%	6,124
Chisago	8,611	48.56%	5,984	33.74%	2,812	15.86%	128	0.72%	198	1.12%	2,627	14.82%	17,733
Clay	10,476	49.14%	8,764	41.11%	1,733	8.13%	160	0.75%	186	0.87%	1,712	8.03%	21,319
Clearwater	1,578	44.91%	1,423	40.50%	471	13.40%	24	0.68%	18	0.51%	155	4.41%	3,514
Cook	1,169	46.22%	1,010	39.94%	246	9.73%	60	2.37%	44	1.74%	159	6.28%	2,529
Cottonwood	2,737	44.35%	2,633	42.66%	741	12.01%	19	0.31%	42	0.68%	104	1.69%	6,172
Crow Wing	11,156	44.69%	10,095	40.44%	3,423	13.71%	124	0.50%	165	0.66%	1,061	4.25%	24,963
Dakota	77,297	50.11%	57,244	37.11%	17,095	11.08%	965	0.63%	1,665	1.08%	20,053	13.00%	154,266
Dodge	3,233	43.48%	2,888	38.84%	1,223	16.45%	32	0.43%	59	0.79%	345	4.64%	7,435
Douglas	6,450	41.71%	6,747	43.63%	2,093	13.53%	66	0.43%	108	0.70%	-297	-1.92%	15,464
Faribault	3,817	46.20%	3,272	39.60%	1,103	13.35%	20	0.24%	50	0.61%	545	6.60%	8,262
Fillmore	4,732	47.99%	3,466	35.15%	1,575	15.97%	40	0.41%	48	0.49%	1,266	12.84%	9,861
Freeborn	8,458	52.90%	5,166	32.31%	2,226	13.92%	44	0.28%	94	0.59%	3,292	20.59%	15,988
Goodhue	9,931	48.88%	7,293	35.89%	2,806	13.81%	134	0.66%	154	0.76%	2,638	12.99%	20,318
Grant	1,806	50.70%	1,284	36.05%	434	12.18%	11	0.31%	27	0.76%	522	14.65%	3,562
Hennepin	285,126	54.38%	173,887	33.17%	47,663	9.09%	10,601	2.02%	7,029	1.34%	111,239	21.21%	524,306
Houston	4,153	43.95%	3,674	38.88%	1,439	15.23%	77	0.81%	107	1.13%	479	5.07%	9,450
Hubbard	3,802	43.65%	3,593	41.25%	1,141	13.10%	98	1.13%	77	0.88%	209	2.40%	8,711
Isanti	6,041	46.63%	4,450	34.35%	2,242	17.31%	72	0.56%	150	1.16%	1,591	12.28%	12,955
Itasca	10,706	52.29%	6,506	31.78%	2,889	14.11%	192	0.94%	180	0.88%	4,200	20.51%	20,473
Jackson	2,727	46.70%	2,153	36.87%	908	15.55%	15	0.26%	36	0.62%	574	9.83%	5,839
Kanabec	2,927	49.21%	1,924	32.35%	996	16.75%	31	0.52%	70	1.18%	1,003	16.86%	5,948
Kandiyohi	9,009	48.61%	7,119	38.41%	2,229	12.03%	82	0.44%	93	0.50%	1,890	10.20%	18,532
Kittson	1,394	50.71%	1,055	38.38%	270	9.82%	8	0.29%	22	0.80%	339	12.33%	2,749
Koochiching	3,472	51.59%	2,080	30.91%	1,098	16.32%	41	0.61%	39	0.58%	1,392	20.68%	6,730
Lac qui Parle	2,420	54.20%	1,447	32.41%	561	12.56%	14	0.31%	23	0.52%	973	21.79%	4,465
Lake	3,388	56.20%	1,684	27.93%	752	12.47%	115	1.91%	90	1.49%	1,704	28.27%	6,029
Lake of the Woods	888	44.16%	814	40.48%	287	14.27%	11	0.55%	11	0.55%	74	3.68%	2,011
Le Sueur	5,457	48.68%	3,902	34.81%	1,699	15.16%	55	0.49%	96	0.86%	1,555	13.87%	11,209
Lincoln	1,641	48.58%	1,199	35.49%	504	14.92%	12	0.36%	22	0.65%	442	13.09%	3,378
Lyon	5,062	44.11%	4,932	42.97%	1,351	11.77%	62	0.54%	70	0.61%	130	1.14%	11,477
Mahnomen	1,026	46.45%	877	39.70%	270	12.22%	24	1.09%	12	0.54%	149	6.75%	2,209
Marshall	2,333	45.27%	2,068	40.12%	710	13.78%	14	0.27%	29	0.56%	265	5.15%	5,154
Martin	4,718	44.86%	4,303	40.91%	1,405	13.36%	28	0.27%	63	0.60%	415	3.95%	10,517
McLeod	6,027	42.86%	5,474	38.92%	2,402	17.08%	48	0.34%	112	0.80%	553	3.94%	14,063
Meeker	4,531	47.01%	3,428	35.56%	1,571	16.30%	32	0.33%	77	0.80%	1,103	11.45%	9,639
Mille Lacs	4,336	48.86%	2,948	33.22%	1,467	16.53%	54	0.61%	70	0.79%	1,388	15.64%	8,875
Morrison	5,728	43.11%	5,054	38.03%	2,310	17.38%	75	0.56%	121	0.91%	674	5.08%	13,288
Mower	10,413	57.65%	4,994	27.65%	2,464	13.64%	72	0.40%	120	0.66%	5,419	30.00%	18,063
Murray	2,173	44.63%	1,907	39.17%	753	15.47%	14	0.29%	22	0.45%	266	5.46%	4,869
Nicollet	6,772	48.92%	5,057	36.53%	1,737	12.55%	151	1.09%	125	0.90%	1,715	12.39%	13,842
Nobles	4,106	45.32%	3,769	41.60%	1,132	12.49%	18	0.20%	36	0.40%	337	3.72%	9,061
Norman	1,875	50.30%	1,392	37.34%	425	11.40%	14	0.38%	22	0.59%	483	12.96%	3,728
Olmsted	22,857	43.92%	22,860	43.92%	5,640	10.84%	299	0.57%	388	0.75%	-3	-0.00%	52,044
Otter Tail	10,519	40.69%	11,808	45.68%	3,191	12.34%	128	0.50%	204	0.79%	-1,289	-4.99%	25,850
Pennington	2,814	47.57%	2,129	35.99%	910	15.38%	27	0.46%	35	0.59%	685	11.58%	5,915
Pine	5,432	52.70%	3,080	29.88%	1,597	15.49%	89	0.86%	110	1.07%	2,352	22.82%	10,308
Pipestone	1,999	42.33%	2,096	44.39%	599	12.69%	8	0.17%	20	0.42%	-97	-2.06%	4,722
Polk	6,369	46.88%	5,563	40.94%	1,502	11.05%	59	0.43%	94	0.69%	806	5.94%	13,587
Pope	2,803	50.70%	1,992	36.03%	665	12.03%	26	0.47%	43	0.78%	811	14.67%	5,529
Ramsey	133,878	58.66%	66,954	29.34%	20,351	8.92%	4,203	1.84%	2,827	1.24%	66,924	29.32%	228,213
Red Lake	1,053	50.00%	695	33.00%	334	15.86%	9	0.43%	15	0.71%	358	17.00%	2,106
Redwood	2,997	38.17%	3,700	47.13%	1,053	13.41%	28	0.36%	73	0.93%	-703	-8.96%	7,851
Renville	3,956	48.02%	2,887	35.04%	1,311	15.91%	31	0.38%	53	0.64%	1,069	12.98%	8,238
Rice	12,821	54.98%	7,016	30.09%	2,872	12.32%	364	1.56%	247	1.06%	5,805	24.89%	23,320
Rock	2,142	43.68%	2,169	44.23%	554	11.30%	15	0.31%	24	0.49%	-27	-0.55%	4,904
Roseau	2,759	39.93%	2,988	43.25%	1,081	15.65%	16	0.23%	65	0.94%	-229	-3.32%	6,909
St. Louis	60,736	60.62%	25,553	25.50%	11,308	11.29%	1,592	1.59%	1,007	1.01%	35,183	35.12%	100,196
Scott	14,657	44.62%	12,734	38.77%	4,886	14.88%	164	0.50%	406	1.24%	1,923	5.85%	32,847
Sherburne	10,551	45.33%	8,699	37.37%	3,665	15.75%	133	0.57%	227	0.98%	1,852	7.96%	23,275
Sibley	2,769	41.66%	2,590	38.96%	1,226	18.44%	15	0.23%	47	0.71%	179	2.70%	6,647
Stearns	24,238	44.03%	21,474	39.01%	8,150	14.81%	496	0.90%	687	1.25%	2,764	5.02%	55,045
Steele	6,974	46.61%	5,617	37.54%	2,197	14.68%	65	0.43%	111	0.74%	1,357	9.07%	14,964
Stevens	2,741	50.25%	2,141	39.25%	467	8.56%	53	0.97%	53	0.97%	600	11.00%	5,455
Swift	3,054	57.30%	1,541	28.91%	690	12.95%	10	0.19%	35	0.66%	1,513	28.39%	5,330
Todd	4,520	42.24%	4,078	38.11%	1,958	18.30%	48	0.45%	97	0.91%	442	4.13%	10,701
Traverse	1,135	50.92%	775	34.77%	295	13.23%	2	0.09%	22	0.99%	360	16.15%	2,229
Wabasha	4,523	47.25%	3,452	36.06%	1,474	15.40%	48	0.50%	76	0.79%	1,071	11.19%	9,573
Wadena	2,480	41.06%	2,696	44.64%	801	13.26%	26	0.43%	37	0.61%	-216	-3.58%	6,040
Waseca	3,819	45.08%	3,171	37.43%	1,385	16.35%	29	0.34%	68	0.80%	648	7.65%	8,472
Washington	45,119	51.24%	31,219	35.45%	10,106	11.48%	737	0.84%	876	0.99%	13,900	15.79%	88,057
Watonwan	2,534	47.89%	1,997	37.74%	711	13.44%	17	0.32%	32	0.60%	537	10.15%	5,291
Wilkin	1,319	40.96%	1,508	46.83%	358	11.12%	16	0.50%	19	0.59%	-189	-5.87%	3,220
Winona	10,272	47.52%	7,955	36.80%	2,907	13.45%	249	1.15%	233	1.08%	2,317	10.72%	21,616
Wright	15,542	44.57%	13,224	37.92%	5,550	15.91%	179	0.51%	379	1.09%	2,318	6.65%	34,874
Yellow Medicine	2,741	48.74%	2,006	35.67%	818	14.54%	20	0.36%	39	0.69%	735	13.07%	5,624
Totals	1,120,438	51.10%	766,476	34.96%	257,704	11.75%	24,908	1.14%	23,114	1.05%	353,962	16.14%	2,192,640

==== Counties that flipped from Republican to Democratic ====
- Becker
- Cottonwood
- Crow Wing
- Dodge
- Faribault
- Houston
- Lyon
- Martin
- McLeod
- Stearns
- Steele

=== By congressional district ===
Clinton won all eight congressional districts, including two that elected Republicans.

District	Clinton	Dole	Perot	Representative
1st	49%	37%	14%	Gil Gutknecht
2nd	46%	40%	14%	David Minge
3rd	47%	41%	10%	Jim Ramstad
4th	58%	30%	9%	Bruce Vento
5th	62%	25%	8%	Martin Olav Sabo
6th	51%	35%	12%	Bill Luther
7th	45%	40%	13%	Collin Peterson
8th	53%	31%	14%	Jim Oberstar

== See also ==
- United States presidential elections in Minnesota
