= Rosby, Minnesota =

Unincorporated community in Minnesota, United States

Rosby
- Unincorporated community
- Location within Minnesota Location within the United States
- Coordinates: 47°24′36″N 94°48′24″W
- Country: United States
- State: Minnesota
- County: Beltrami, Hubbard
- Elevation: 1,352 ft (412 m)
- Time zone: UTC-6 (Central (CST))
  - Summer (DST): UTC-5 (CDT)
- Area code: 218
- GNIS feature ID: 658089

Rosby is an unincorporated community in Beltrami and Hubbard counties, in the U.S. state of Minnesota.

== History ==
A post office was established at Rosby in 1900, and remained in operation until 1909. The community was named for Ole Rosby, an early Norwegian settler.
