= McNary =

McNary may refer to:

== People ==
- McNary (surname)

== Places ==
In the United States:

- McNary, Arizona
- McNary, Kentucky
- McNary, Louisiana
- McNary, Oregon
- McNary, Texas

== Other uses ==
- McNary Dam, a dam structure built across the Columbia River
- McNary Field, a public airport in Salem, Oregon
  - McNary ARNG Field Heliport
- McNary High School, a high school in Keizer, Oregon
