= Lake George (Indiana) =

Lake George may refer to any of these lakes in Indiana, USA:

- Lake George (Steuben County, Indiana), a recreational lake on the Indiana-Michigan state line
- Lake George (Hammond, Indiana), a lake in the city of Hammond, Lake County
- Lake George (Hobart, Indiana), a mill pond in the city of Hobart, Lake County

== See also ==
- Lake George (disambiguation)
