= Nary, Minnesota =

Unincorporated community in Minnesota, United States

Nary
- Unincorporated community
- Location within Minnesota Location within the United States
- Coordinates: 47°22′01″N 94°49′24″W
- Country: United States
- State: Minnesota
- County: Hubbard
- Elevation: 1,427 ft (435 m)
- Time zone: UTC-6 (Central (CST))
  - Summer (DST): UTC-5 (CDT)
- Area code: 218
- GNIS feature ID: 657567

Nary is an unincorporated community in Hubbard County, in the U.S. state of Minnesota. It is along the Paul Bunyan State Trail, formerly the Burlington Northern Railroad. The offices for Helga Township are located in Nary.

== History ==
A post office was established in Nary in 1899, closed in 1917, reopened in 1918, then closed permanently in 1924. The community was named for Thomas J. Nary, a businessperson in the lumber industry.

Historical population
Census	Pop.	Note	%±
1900	94		—
1910	49		−47.9%
U.S. Decennial Census
