= Nevis Township, Hubbard County, Minnesota =

Nevis Township, Minnesota
- Township
- Location of Nevis Township, within Hubbard County, Minnesota
- Coordinates: 46°56′44″N 94°51′29″W
- Country: United States
- State: Minnesota
- County: Hubbard

Area
  - Total: 33.5 sq mi (86.7 km^{2})
  - Land: 27.8 sq mi (71.9 km^{2})
  - Water: 5.7 sq mi (14.8 km^{2})
- Elevation: 1,440 ft (439 m)

Population (2020)
  - Total: 1,143
  - Density: 41.2/sq mi (15.9/km^{2})
- Time zone: UTC-6 (Central (CST))
  - Summer (DST): UTC-5 (CDT)
- ZIP code: 56467
- Area code: 218
- FIPS code: 27-45358
- GNIS feature ID: 0665086

Nevis Township is a township in Hubbard County, Minnesota, United States. The population was 1,143 at the 2020 census.

Nevis Township may be named after Ben Nevis, in Scotland.

== Geography ==
According to the United States Census Bureau, the township has a total area of 33.5 square miles (86.7 km^{2}), of which 27.8 square miles (71.9 km^{2}) is land and 5.7 square miles (14.8 km^{2}) (17.08%) is water.

== Demographics ==
As of the census of 2000, there were 875 people, 368 households, and 277 families residing in the township. The population density was 31.5 inhabitants per square mile (12.2/km^{2}). There were 828 housing units at an average density of 29.8 per square mile (11.5/km^{2}). The racial makeup of the township was 97.60% White, 0.57% African American, 0.46% Native American, 0.23% Asian, 0.69% from other races, and 0.46% from two or more races. Hispanic or Latino of any race were 0.91% of the population.

There were 368 households, out of which 23.4% had children under the age of 18 living with them, 66.3% were married couples living together, 3.5% had a female householder with no husband present, and 24.7% were non-families. 22.6% of all households were made up of individuals, and 13.9% had someone living alone who was 65 years of age or older. The average household size was 2.36 and the average family size was 2.69.

In the township the population was spread out, with 20.5% under the age of 18, 5.5% from 18 to 24, 19.8% from 25 to 44, 33.8% from 45 to 64, and 20.5% who were 65 years of age or older. The median age was 48 years. For every 100 females, there were 102.1 males. For every 100 females age 18 and over, there were 102.9 males.

The median income for a household in the township was $40,804, and the median income for a family was $45,625. Males had a median income of $29,000 versus $17,813 for females. The per capita income for the township was $19,315. About 2.6% of families and 5.1% of the population were below the poverty line, including 4.2% of those under age 18 and 3.0% of those age 65 or over.
