= Lake Hattie Township, Hubbard County, Minnesota =

Lake Hattie Township, Minnesota
- Township
- Location of Lake Hattie Township, within Hubbard County, Minnesota
- Coordinates: 47°16′49″N 95°6′48″W
- Country: United States
- State: Minnesota
- County: Hubbard

Area
  - Total: 34.5 sq mi (89.3 km^{2})
  - Land: 33.4 sq mi (86.6 km^{2})
  - Water: 1.0 sq mi (2.7 km^{2})
- Elevation: 1,440 ft (440 m)

Population (2020)
  - Total: 180
  - Density: 5.4/sq mi (2.1/km^{2})
- Time zone: UTC-6 (Central (CST))
  - Summer (DST): UTC-5 (CDT)
- FIPS code: 27-34460
- GNIS feature ID: 0664679

Lake Hattie Township is a township in Hubbard County, Minnesota, United States. The population was 180 at the 2020 census.

== Geography ==
According to the United States Census Bureau, the township has a total area of 34.5 square miles (89 km^{2}), of which 33.4 square miles (87 km^{2}) is land and 1.0 square mile (2.6 km^{2}) (2.96%) is water.

== Demographics ==
As of the census of 2000, there were 130 people, 50 households, and 31 families residing in the township. The population density was 3.9 inhabitants per square mile (1.5/km^{2}). There were 101 housing units at an average density of 3.0 per square mile (1.2/km^{2}). The racial makeup of the township was 93.85% White, 4.62% Native American, 0.77% from other races, and 0.77% from two or more races.

There were 50 households, out of which 30.0% had children under the age of 18 living with them, 60.0% were married couples living together, 2.0% had a female householder with no husband present, and 38.0% were non-families. 30.0% of all households were made up of individuals, and 10.0% had someone living alone who was 65 years of age or older. The average household size was 2.60 and the average family size was 3.35.

In the township the population was spread out, with 30.0% under the age of 18, 7.7% from 18 to 24, 25.4% from 25 to 44, 24.6% from 45 to 64, and 12.3% who were 65 years of age or older. The median age was 38 years. For every 100 females, there were 100.0 males. For every 100 females age 18 and over, there were 106.8 males.

The median income for a household in the township was $26,563, and the median income for a family was $33,125. Males had a median income of $41,250 versus $14,750 for females. The per capita income for the township was $15,679. There were 20.0% of families and 14.7% of the population living below the poverty line, including 10.0% of under eighteens and 23.1% of those over 64.
