= Lake George (Cass County, Minnesota) =

Lake in the state of Minnesota, United States

- Location within Minnesota
- Location: Cass County, Minnesota
- Coordinates: 46°52′52″N 94°1′37″W
- Type: lake

Lake George is a lake in Cass County, Minnesota, in the United States.

Lake George was named for an early lumberman.

== See also ==
- List of lakes in Minnesota
