= Akeley Township, Hubbard County, Minnesota =

Akeley Township, Minnesota
- Township
- Location of Akeley Township, within Hubbard County, Minnesota
- Coordinates: 47°0′54″N 94°44′8″W
- Country: United States
- State: Minnesota
- County: Hubbard

Area
  - Total: 34.4 sq mi (89.2 km^{2})
  - Land: 31.4 sq mi (81.2 km^{2})
  - Water: 3.1 sq mi (7.9 km^{2})
- Elevation: 1,440 ft (440 m)

Population (2020)
  - Total: 559
  - Density: 17.8/sq mi (6.88/km^{2})
- Time zone: UTC-6 (Central (CST))
  - Summer (DST): UTC-5 (CDT)
- ZIP code: 56433
- Area code: 218
- FIPS code: 27-00514
- GNIS feature ID: 0663391
- Website: https://www.akeleytownship.com/

Akeley Township (/ˈeɪkli/ AY-klee) is a township in Hubbard County, Minnesota, United States. The population was 559 at the 2020 census.

== Geography ==
According to the United States Census Bureau, the township has a total area of 34.4 square miles (89 km^{2}), of which 31.4 square miles (81 km^{2}) is land and 3.1 square miles (8.0 km^{2}) (8.89%) is water.

== Demographics ==
As of the census of 2000, there were 481 people, 193 households, and 141 families residing in the township. The population density was 15.3 people per square mile (5.9/km^{2}). There were 355 housing units at an average density of 11.3/sq mi (4.4/km^{2}). The racial makeup of the township was 99.58% White, 0.21% Asian, and 0.21% from two or more races. Hispanic or Latino of any race were 0.21% of the population.

There were 193 households, out of which 26.4% had children under the age of 18 living with them, 66.8% were married couples living together, 4.7% had a female householder with no husband present, and 26.9% were non-families. 20.2% of all households were made up of individuals, and 8.8% had someone living alone who was 65 years of age or older. The average household size was 2.49 and the average family size was 2.87.

In the township the population was spread out, with 21.8% under the age of 18, 4.2% from 18 to 24, 22.7% from 25 to 44, 35.8% from 45 to 64, and 15.6% who were 65 years of age or older. The median age was 46 years. For every 100 females, there were 114.7 males. For every 100 females age 18 and over, there were 101.1 males.

The median income for a household in the township was $33,571, and the median income for a family was $41,071. Males had a median income of $25,556 versus $17,361 for females. The per capita income for the township was $14,910. About 5.4% of families and 10.6% of the population were below the poverty line, including 14.1% of those under age 18 and 10.0% of those age 65 or over.
