= Two Inlets Lake =

Lake in the state of Minnesota, United States

- Location within Minnesota
- Location: Becker County, Minnesota
- Coordinates: 47°1′49″N 95°11′39″W
- Type: lake

Two Inlets Lake is a lake in Becker County, Minnesota, in the United States.

Two Inlets Lake was named from two inflowing streams which meet at nearly the same point.

== See also ==
- List of lakes in Minnesota
