= White Oak Township, Hubbard County, Minnesota =

White Oak Township, Minnesota
- Township
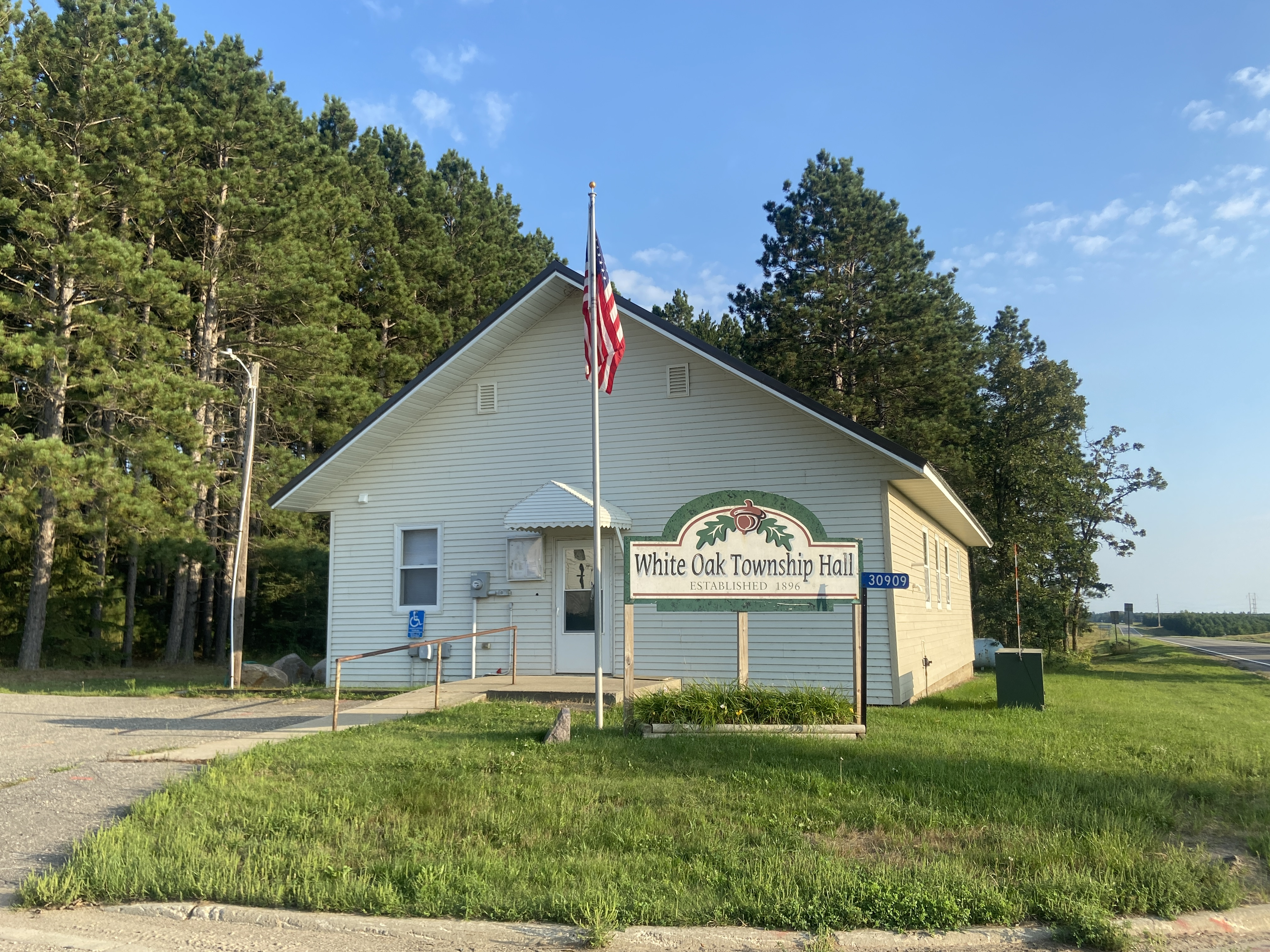
- White Oak Township Hall

- Location of White Oak Township, within Hubbard County, Minnesota
- Coordinates: 46°56′30″N 94°43′54″W
- Country: United States
- State: Minnesota
- County: Hubbard

Area
  - Total: 36.4 sq mi (94.4 km^{2})
  - Land: 34.4 sq mi (89.1 km^{2})
  - Water: 2.0 sq mi (5.3 km^{2})
- Elevation: 1,463 ft (446 m)

Population (2020)
  - Total: 486
  - Density: 14.1/sq mi (5.45/km^{2})
- Time zone: UTC-6 (Central (CST))
  - Summer (DST): UTC-5 (CDT)
- FIPS code: 27-70114
- GNIS feature ID: 0665989
- Website: https://whiteoaktownshipmn.gov/

White Oak Township is a township in Hubbard County, Minnesota, United States. The population was 486 at the 2020 census.

White Oak Township was so named for the abundance of white oak in the area.

== Geography ==
According to the United States Census Bureau, the township has a total area of 36.5 square miles (94.4 km^{2}), of which 34.4 square miles (89.1 km^{2}) are land and 2.1 square miles (5.3 km^{2}) (5.65%) are water.

== Demographics ==
As of the census of 2000, there were 359 people, 156 households, and 102 families residing in the township. The population density was 10.4 people per square mile (4.0/km^{2}). There were 337 housing units at an average density of 9.8/sq mi (3.8/km^{2}). The racial makeup of the township was 99.44% White, 0.28% Native American, and 0.28% from two or more races. Hispanic or Latino of any race were 0.28% of the population.

There were 156 households, out of which 23.7% had children under the age of 18 living with them, 53.8% were married couples living together, 3.2% had a female householder with no husband present, and 34.6% were non-families. 32.7% of all households were made up of individuals, and 14.1% had someone living alone who was 65 years of age or older. The average household size was 2.30 and the average family size was 2.81.

In the township the population was spread out, with 23.1% under the age of 18, 6.4% from 18 to 24, 20.9% from 25 to 44, 29.8% from 45 to 64, and 19.8% who were 65 years of age or older. The median age was 45 years. For every 100 females, there were 112.4 males. For every 100 females age 18 and over, there were 109.1 males.

The median income for a household in the township was $27,396, and the median income for a family was $32,500. Males had a median income of $30,000 versus $18,500 for females. The per capita income for the township was $15,221. About 3.1% of families and 6.8% of the population were below the poverty line, including 4.8% of those under age 18 and 5.2% of those age 65 or over.
