= Lake George (lake, Hubbard County, Minnesota) =

Lake in the state of Minnesota, United States

- Location within Minnesota
- Location: Hubbard County, Minnesota
- Coordinates: 47°11′36″N 94°58′31″W
- Type: lake

Lake George is a lake in Hubbard County, in the U.S. state of Minnesota.

Lake George was named for the brother of Minnesota explorer Captain Willard Glazier.

== See also ==
- List of lakes in Minnesota
