= Steamboat River Township, Hubbard County, Minnesota =

Steamboat River Township, Minnesota
- Township
- Location of Steamboat River Township, within Hubbard County, Minnesota
- Coordinates: 47°8′9″N 94°41′56″W
- Country: United States
- State: Minnesota
- County: Hubbard

Area
  - Total: 36.0 sq mi (93.2 km^{2})
  - Land: 34.5 sq mi (89.4 km^{2})
  - Water: 1.5 sq mi (3.8 km^{2})
- Elevation: 1,463 ft (446 m)

Population (2020)
  - Total: 140
  - Density: 4.1/sq mi (1.6/km^{2})
- Time zone: UTC-6 (Central (CST))
  - Summer (DST): UTC-5 (CDT)
- FIPS code: 27-62618
- GNIS feature ID: 0665703

Steamboat River Township is a township in Hubbard County, Minnesota, United States. The population was 140 at the 2020 census.

== Geography ==
According to the United States Census Bureau, the township has a total area of 36.0 square miles (93.2 km^{2}), of which 34.5 square miles (89.4 km^{2}) is land and 1.5 square miles (3.8 km^{2}) (4.03%) is water.

== Demographics ==
As of the census of 2000, there were 123 people, 50 households, and 43 families residing in the township. The population density was 3.6 people per square mile (1.4/km^{2}). There were 121 housing units at an average density of 3.5/sq mi (1.4/km^{2}). The racial makeup of the township was 96.75% White, 0.81% African American, 1.63% Native American and 0.81% Asian.

There were 50 households, out of which 28.0% had children under the age of 18 living with them, 80.0% were married couples living together, 4.0% had a female householder with no husband present, and 14.0% were non-families. 12.0% of all households were made up of individuals, and 6.0% had someone living alone who was 65 years of age or older. The average household size was 2.46 and the average family size was 2.67.

In the township the population was spread out, with 22.0% under the age of 18, 4.1% from 18 to 24, 22.8% from 25 to 44, 26.8% from 45 to 64, and 24.4% who were 65 years of age or older. The median age was 47 years. For every 100 females, there were 108.5 males. For every 100 females age 18 and over, there were 113.3 males.

The median income for a household in the township was $42,750, and the median income for a family was $43,500. Males had a median income of $30,417 versus $43,333 for females. The per capita income for the township was $20,335. There were 6.8% of families and 7.2% of the population living below the poverty line, including 17.6% of under eighteens and none of those over 64.
