= Guthrie Township, Hubbard County, Minnesota =

Guthrie Township, Minnesota
- Township
- Motto: "Grassroots Government Of Minnesota"
- Location of Guthrie Township, within Hubbard County, Minnesota
- Coordinates: 47°16′54″N 94°50′6″W
- Country: United States
- State: Minnesota
- County: Hubbard

Area
  - Total: 35.3 sq mi (91.5 km^{2})
  - Land: 34.8 sq mi (90.2 km^{2})
  - Water: 0.50 sq mi (1.3 km^{2})
- Elevation: 1,437 ft (438 m)

Population (2020)
  - Total: 603
  - Density: 17.3/sq mi (6.69/km^{2})
- Time zone: UTC-6 (Central (CST))
  - Summer (DST): UTC-5 (CDT)
- ZIP code: 56461
- Area code: 218
- FIPS code: 27-26360
- GNIS feature ID: 0664365
- Website: www.township.guthrie.mn.us

Guthrie Township is a township in Hubbard County, Minnesota, United States. The population was 603 at the 2020 census.

== History ==
The township was named for railroad builder Archibald Guthrie.

== Geography ==
According to the United States Census Bureau, the township has a total area of 35.3 square miles (91 km^{2}), of which 34.8 square miles (90 km^{2}) is land and 0.5 square miles (1.3 km^{2}) (1.41%) is water.

== Demographics ==
As of the census of 2000, there were 436 people, 160 households, and 126 families residing in the township. The population density was 12.5 inhabitants per square mile (4.8/km^{2}). There were 170 housing units at an average density of 4.9 per square mile (1.9/km^{2}). The racial makeup of the township was 94.72% White, 0.46% African American, 3.21% Native American, 0.23% from other races, and 1.38% from two or more races.

There were 160 households, out of which 36.3% had children under the age of 18 living with them, 67.5% were married couples living together, 7.5% had a female householder with no husband present, and 21.3% were non-families. 17.5% of all households were made up of individuals, and 8.1% had someone living alone who was 65 years of age or older. The average household size was 2.73 and the average family size was 3.02.

In the township the population was spread out, with 30.0% under the age of 18, 5.5% from 18 to 24, 30.5% from 25 to 44, 25.7% from 45 to 64, and 8.3% who were 65 years of age or older. The median age was 36 years. For every 100 females, there were 97.3 males. For every 100 females age 18 and over, there were 96.8 males.

The median income for a household in the township was $41,250, and the median income for a family was $45,278. Males had a median income of $36,125 versus $19,583 for females. The per capita income for the township was $21,561. About 8.7% of families and 12.1% of the population were below the poverty line, including 22.0% of those under age 18 and 4.5% of those age 65 or over.
