= Thorpe Township, Hubbard County, Minnesota =

Thorpe Township, Minnesota
- Township
- Location of Thorpe Township, within Hubbard County, Minnesota
- Coordinates: 47°6′2″N 94°51′19″W
- Country: United States
- State: Minnesota
- County: Hubbard

Area
  - Total: 36.0 sq mi (93.3 km^{2})
  - Land: 34.8 sq mi (90.1 km^{2})
  - Water: 1.2 sq mi (3.2 km^{2})
- Elevation: 1,667 ft (508 m)

Population (2020)
  - Total: 39
  - Density: 1.1/sq mi (0.43/km^{2})
- Time zone: UTC-6 (Central (CST))
  - Summer (DST): UTC-5 (CDT)
- FIPS code: 27-64804
- GNIS feature ID: 0665785
- Website: https://thorpetownship.gov/

Thorpe Township is a township in Hubbard County, Minnesota, United States. The population was 39 at the 2020 census.

Thorpe Township was named for Joseph Thorpe, an early settler and local educator.

== Geography ==
According to the United States Census Bureau, the township has a total area of 36.0 square miles (93.3 km^{2}), of which 34.8 square miles (90.1 km^{2}) is land and 1.2 square miles (3.2 km^{2}) (3.44%) is water.

== Demographics ==
As of the census of 2000, there were 37 people, 18 households, and 10 families residing in the township. The population density was 1.1 people per square mile (0.4/km^{2}). There were 86 housing units at an average density of 2.5/sq mi (1.0/km^{2}). The racial makeup of the township was 100.00% White.

There were 18 households, out of which 27.8% had children under the age of 18 living with them, 44.4% were married couples living together, 16.7% had a female householder with no husband present, and 38.9% were non-families. 27.8% of all households were made up of individuals, and 22.2% had someone living alone who was 65 years of age or older. The average household size was 2.06 and the average family size was 2.36.

In the township the population was spread out, with 16.2% under the age of 18, 2.7% from 18 to 24, 13.5% from 25 to 44, 35.1% from 45 to 64, and 32.4% who were 65 years of age or older. The median age was 56 years. For every 100 females, there were 117.6 males. For every 100 females age 18 and over, there were 93.8 males.

The median income for a household in the township was $31,875, and the median income for a family was $31,250. Males had a median income of $21,250 versus $23,750 for females. The per capita income for the township was $18,576. There were 12.5% of families and 10.5% of the population living below the poverty line, including 100.0% of under eighteens and none of those over 64.
