= Lake George (community), Minnesota =

Unincorporated community in Minnesota, US

Lake George
- Census-designated place
- Location within Minnesota Location within the United States
- Coordinates: 47°12′02″N 94°59′37″W
- Country: United States
- State: Minnesota
- County: Hubbard
- Township: Lake George

Area
  - Total: 6.73 sq mi (17.42 km^{2})
  - Land: 5.07 sq mi (13.14 km^{2})
  - Water: 1.65 sq mi (4.28 km^{2})
- Elevation: 1,424 ft (434 m)

Population (2020)
  - Total: 233
  - Density: 45.9/sq mi (17.74/km^{2})
- Time zone: UTC-6 (Central (CST))
  - Summer (DST): UTC-5 (CDT)
- ZIP code: 56458
- Area code: 218
- GNIS feature ID: 646355

Lake George is an unincorporated community and census-designated place (CDP) in Lake George Township, Hubbard County, Minnesota, United States. As of the 2010 census, its population was 230. The population was 233 at the time of the 2020 census.

The community is located along U.S. Highway 71 and State Highway 200 (MN 200) near Hubbard County Road 4. Nearby places include Laporte, Park Rapids, and Itasca State Park.

Lake George has a post office with ZIP code 56458, which opened in 1903. The village of Lake George held its 40th annual Blueberry Festival in July 2024.

== Demographics ==
Historical population
Census	Pop.	Note	%±
2020	233		—
U.S. Decennial Census
