= Fern Township, Hubbard County, Minnesota =

Fern Township, Minnesota
- Township
- Location of Fern Township, within Hubbard County, Minnesota
- Coordinates: 47°21′29″N 95°6′31″W
- Country: United States
- State: Minnesota
- County: Hubbard

Area
  - Total: 36.2 sq mi (93.7 km^{2})
  - Land: 35.5 sq mi (91.9 km^{2})
  - Water: 0.69 sq mi (1.8 km^{2})
- Elevation: 1,480 ft (451 m)

Population (2020)
  - Total: 285
  - Density: 8.03/sq mi (3.10/km^{2})
- Time zone: UTC-6 (Central (CST))
  - Summer (DST): UTC-5 (CDT)
- FIPS code: 27-20942
- GNIS feature ID: 0664161

Fern Township is a township in Hubbard County, Minnesota, United States. The population was 285 at the 2020 census. Fern Township was named for Fern Smith, the daughter of Seth Smith, an early homesteader.

== Geography ==
According to the United States Census Bureau, the township has a total area of 36.2 square miles (94 km^{2}), of which 35.5 square miles (92 km^{2}) is land and 0.7 square miles (1.8 km^{2}) (1.88%) is water.

== Demographics ==
As of the census of 2000, there were 209 people, 79 households, and 54 families residing in the township. The population density was 5.9 inhabitants per square mile (2.3/km^{2}). There were 109 housing units at an average density of 3.1 per square mile (1.2/km^{2}). The racial makeup of the township was 99.04% White and 0.96% Native American.

There were 79 households, out of which 34.2% had children under the age of 18 living with them, 58.2% were married couples living together, 7.6% had a female householder with no husband present, and 30.4% were non-families. 21.5% of all households were made up of individuals, and 5.1% had someone living alone who was 65 years of age or older. The average household size was 2.65 and the average family size was 3.20.

In the township the population was spread out, with 26.8% under the age of 18, 9.1% from 18 to 24, 31.1% from 25 to 44, 26.3% from 45 to 64, and 6.7% who were 65 years of age or older. The median age was 38 years. For every 100 females, there were 106.9 males. For every 100 females age 18 and over, there were 104.0 males.

The median income for a household in the township was $41,000, and the median income for a family was $43,333. Males had a median income of $32,083 versus $21,406 for females. The per capita income for the township was $14,764. About 3.3% of families and 5.7% of the population were below the poverty line, including none of those under the age of eighteen or sixty five or over.
