= Lake George Township, Hubbard County, Minnesota =

Lake George Township, Minnesota
- Township
- Location of Lake George Township, within Hubbard County, Minnesota
- Coordinates: 47°12′16″N 94°59′4″W
- Country: United States
- State: Minnesota
- County: Hubbard

Area
  - Total: 36.2 sq mi (93.7 km^{2})
  - Land: 33.8 sq mi (87.5 km^{2})
  - Water: 2.4 sq mi (6.2 km^{2})
- Elevation: 1,417 ft (432 m)

Population (2020)
  - Total: 389
  - Density: 11.5/sq mi (4.45/km^{2})
- Time zone: UTC-6 (Central (CST))
  - Summer (DST): UTC-5 (CDT)
- ZIP code: 56458
- Area code: 218
- FIPS code: 27-34388
- GNIS feature ID: 0664675

Lake George Township is a township in Hubbard County, Minnesota, United States. The population was 389 at the 2020 census. The unincorporated community and census-designated place of Lake George is located within the township.

== Geography ==
According to the United States Census Bureau, the township has a total area of 36.2 square miles (94 km^{2}), of which 33.8 square miles (88 km^{2}) is land and 2.4 square miles (6.2 km^{2}) (6.61%) is water.

== History ==
This township took its name from Lake George.

== Demographics ==
As of the census of 2000, there were 383 people, 152 households, and 115 families residing in the township. The population density was 11.3 inhabitants per square mile (4.4/km^{2}). There were 239 housing units at an average density of 7.1 per square mile (2.7/km^{2}). The racial makeup of the township was 93.73% White, 0.52% African American, 3.92% Native American, 0.26% Asian, and 1.57% from two or more races. Hispanic or Latino of any race were 1.83% of the population.

There were 152 households, out of which 28.3% had children under the age of 18 living with them, 67.1% were married couples living together, 5.9% had a female householder with no husband present, and 24.3% were non-families. 21.1% of all households were made up of individuals, and 10.5% had someone living alone who was 65 years of age or older. The average household size was 2.52 and the average family size was 2.90.

In the township the population was spread out, with 22.5% under the age of 18, 6.5% from 18 to 24, 25.6% from 25 to 44, 29.5% from 45 to 64, and 15.9% who were 65 years of age or older. The median age was 42 years. For every 100 females, there were 108.2 males. For every 100 females age 18 and over, there were 98.0 males.

The median income for a household in the township was $35,078, and the median income for a family was $35,625. Males had a median income of $27,813 versus $18,750 for females. The per capita income for the township was $16,320. About 5.9% of families and 7.4% of the population were below the poverty line, including 15.2% of those under age 18 and 8.3% of those age 65 or over.
