= Lakeport Township, Hubbard County, Minnesota =

Lakeport Township, Minnesota
- Township
- Location of Lakeport Township, within Hubbard County, Minnesota
- Coordinates: 47°10′31″N 94°43′31″W
- Country: United States
- State: Minnesota
- County: Hubbard

Area
  - Total: 35.4 sq mi (91.6 km^{2})
  - Land: 29.5 sq mi (76.5 km^{2})
  - Water: 5.8 sq mi (15.1 km^{2})
- Elevation: 1,309 ft (399 m)

Population (2020)
  - Total: 840
  - Density: 28/sq mi (11/km^{2})
- Time zone: UTC-6 (Central (CST))
  - Summer (DST): UTC-5 (CDT)
- ZIP code: 56461
- Area code: 218
- FIPS code: 27-34838
- GNIS feature ID: 0664696

Lakeport Township is a township in Hubbard County, Minnesota, United States. The population was around 840 at the 2020 census.

The name Lakeport is derived from Laporte, Minnesota.

== Geography ==
According to the United States Census Bureau, the township has a total area of 35.4 square miles (92 km^{2}), of which 29.5 square miles (76 km^{2}) is land and 5.8 square miles (15 km^{2}) (16.48%) is water.

== Demographics ==
Historical population
Census	Pop.	Note	%±
2000	744		—
2010	844		13.4%
2020	840		−0.5%
2023 (est.)	861		2.5%

At the 2000 census there were 744 people, 294 households and 221 families residing in the township. The population density was 25.2 per square mile (9.7/km^{2}). There were 537 housing units at an average density of 18.2/sq mi (7.0/km^{2}). The racial makeup of the township was 95.83% White, 1.48% Native American, 0.13% from other races, and 2.55% from two or more races. Hispanic or Latino of any race were 0.67% of the population.

There were 294 households, of which 31.3% had children under the age of 18 living with them, 66.0% were married couples living together, 5.4% had a female householder with no husband present, and 24.8% were non-families. 21.1% of all households were made up of individuals, and 6.8% had someone living alone who was 65 years of age or older. The average household size was 2.53 and the average family size was 2.91.

26.3% of the population were under the age of 18, 5.9% from 18 to 24, 23.7% from 25 to 44, 28.1% from 45 to 64, and 16.0% who were 65 years of age or older. The median age was 41 years. For every 100 females, there were 100.0 males. For every 100 females age 18 and over, there were 102.2 males.

The median household income was $36,397 and the median family income was $41,696. Males had a median income of $28,571 and females $26,750 for females. The per capita income was $17,750. About 6.5% of families and 10.7% of the population were below the poverty line, including 13.3% of those under age 18 and 1.7% of those age 65 or over.
