= Lake Alice Township, Hubbard County, Minnesota =

Lake Alice Township, Minnesota
- Township
- Location of Lake Alice Township, within Hubbard County
- Coordinates: 47°11′43″N 95°7′25″W
- Country: United States
- State: Minnesota
- County: Hubbard

Area
  - Total: 34.7 sq mi (89.9 km^{2})
  - Land: 33.9 sq mi (87.8 km^{2})
  - Water: 0.81 sq mi (2.1 km^{2})
- Elevation: 1,463 ft (446 m)

Population (2020)
  - Total: 114
  - Density: 3.36/sq mi (1.30/km^{2})
- Time zone: UTC-6 (Central (CST))
  - Summer (DST): UTC-5 (CDT)
- FIPS code: 27-34046
- GNIS feature ID: 0664660

Lake Alice Township is a township in Hubbard County, Minnesota, United States. The population was 114 at the 2020 census.

This township took its name from Lake Alice.

== Geography ==
According to the United States Census Bureau, the township has a total area of 34.7 square miles (90 km^{2}), of which 33.9 square miles (88 km^{2}) is land and 0.8 square miles (2.1 km^{2}) (2.39%) is water.

== Demographics ==
As of the census of 2000, there were 87 people, 39 households, and 28 families residing in the township. The population density was 2.6 inhabitants per square mile (1.0/km^{2}). There were 83 housing units at an average density of 2.4 per square mile (0.93/km^{2}). The racial makeup of the township was 95.40% White, 1.15% from other races, and 3.45% from two or more races. Hispanic or Latino of any race were 1.15% of the population.

There were 39 households, out of which 20.5% had children under the age of 18 living with them, 59.0% were married couples living together, 7.7% had a female householder with no husband present, and 28.2% were non-families. 25.6% of all households were made up of individuals, and 12.8% had someone living alone who was 65 years of age or older. The average household size was 2.23 and the average family size was 2.68.

In the township the population was spread out, with 16.1% under the age of 18, 4.6% from 18 to 24, 29.9% from 25 to 44, 29.9% from 45 to 64, and 19.5% who were 65 years of age or older. The median age was 45 years. For every 100 females, there were 81.3 males. For every 100 females age 18 and over, there were 97.3 males.

The median income for a household in the township was $25,625, and the median income for a family was $33,750. Males had a median income of $19,375 versus $42,917 for females. The per capita income for the township was $13,736. There were 15.4% of families and 16.3% of the population living below the poverty line, including 25.0% of under eighteens and 25.0% of those over 64.
