= Hubbard County, Minnesota =

County in Minnesota, United States

- County
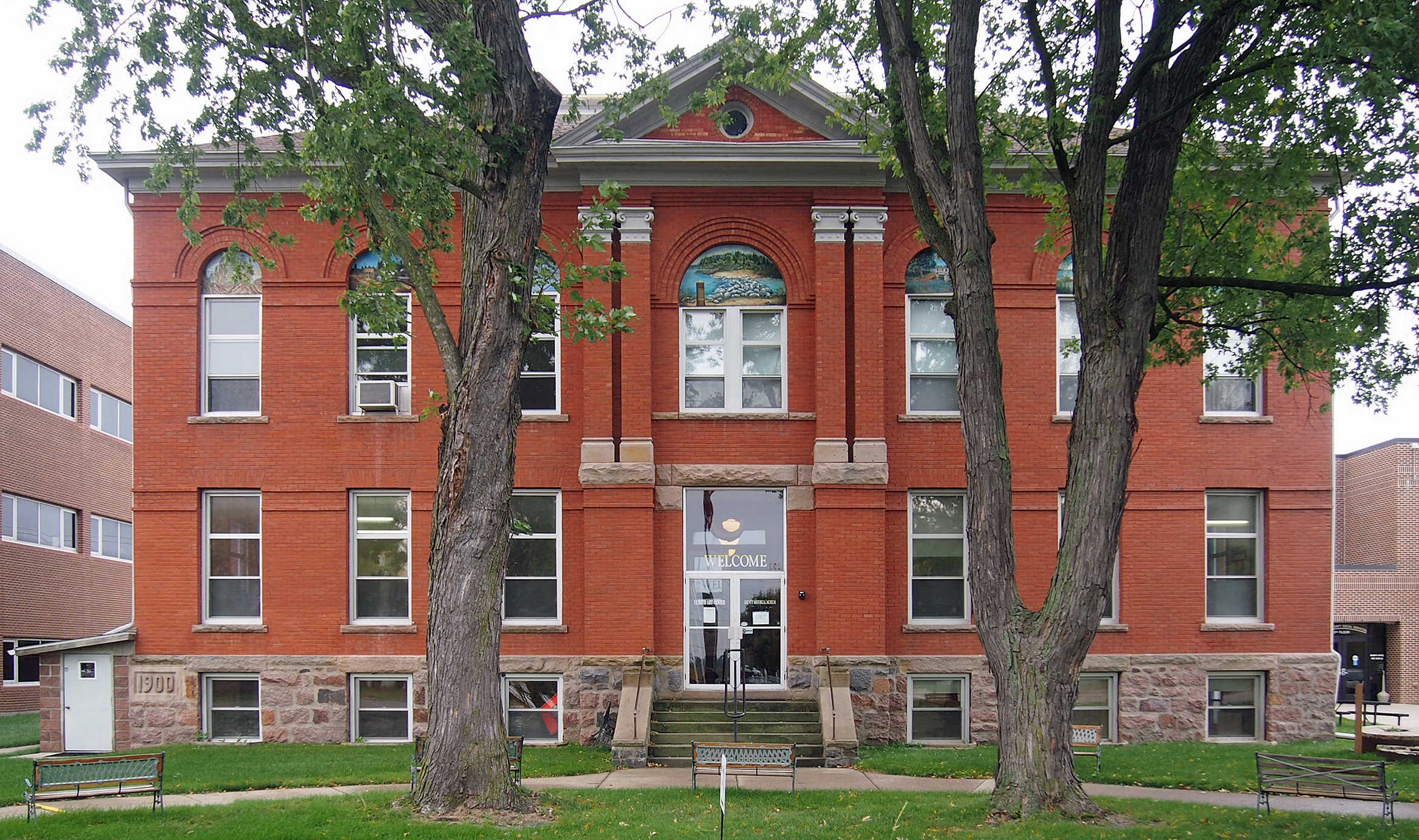
- The historic Hubbard County Courthouse in Park Rapids

- Location within the U.S. state of Minnesota
- Coordinates: 47.095551°N 94.91329°W
- Country: United States
- State: Minnesota
- Founded: February 26, 1883
- Named for: Lucius Frederick Hubbard
- Seat: Park Rapids
- Largest city: Park Rapids

Area
  - Total: 999.500 sq mi (2,588.69 km^{2})
  - Land: 926.021 sq mi (2,398.38 km^{2})
  - Water: 73.479 sq mi (190.31 km^{2}) 7.35%

Population (2020)
  - Total: 21,344
  - Estimate (2025): 22,369 ▲
  - Density: 23.812/sq mi (9.194/km^{2})
- Time zone: UTC−6 (Central)
  - Summer (DST): UTC−5 (CDT)
- Area code: 218
- Congressional districts: 7th, 8th
- Website: www.hubbardcounty.gov

Hubbard County is a county in the northwestern part of the U.S. state of Minnesota. As of the 2020 census, the population was 21,344, and it was estimated to be 22,369 in 2025. Its county seat is Park Rapids.

Part of the Leech Lake Indian Reservation is in Hubbard County.

== History ==
The county was created on February 26, 1883, with territory partitioned from Cass County. It was named for Lucius Frederick Hubbard, a prominent Territory editor, Civil War participant, and businessman who was governor of Minnesota from 1882 to 1887. The county's boundaries have remained unchanged since its creation.

The new county's courthouse was destroyed by fire around 1890, but the public records were salvaged.

== Geography ==
The county's terrain is hilly, largely wooded, and dotted with lakes and ponds. It generally slopes to the east, with the northern part sloping to the north and the southern part sloping to the south. Its highest point is near the lower middle of its western border, at 1,549 ft (472 m) ASL.

According to the United States Census Bureau, the county has an area of 999.500 square miles (2,588.69 km^{2}), of which 926.021 square miles (2,398.38 km^{2}) is land and 73.479 square miles (190.31 km^{2}) (7.35%) is water. It is Minnesota's 24th-largest county by area.

The Forest Service maintains a tower at the Thorpe Lookout, with an elevation of 1,844 feet.

Soils of Hubbard County

=== Major highways ===
- U.S. Highway 2
- U.S. Highway 71
- Minnesota State Highway 34
- Minnesota State Highway 64
- Minnesota State Highway 87
- Minnesota State Highway 113
- Minnesota State Highway 200
- Minnesota State Highway 226

=== Adjacent counties ===
- Beltrami County - north
- Cass County - east
- Wadena County - south
- Becker County - southwest
- Clearwater County - northwest

=== Protected areas ===
- Badoura Jack Pine Woodland Scientific and Natural Area
- Huntersville State Forest (part)
- Itasca State Park (part)
- Mississippi Headwaters (part)
- Paul Bunyan State Forest (part)

== Demographics ==
Historical population
Census	Pop.	Note	%±
1890	1,412		—
1900	6,578		365.9%
1910	9,831		49.5%
1920	10,136		3.1%
1930	9,596		−5.3%
1940	11,085		15.5%
1950	11,085		0.0%
1960	9,962		−10.1%
1970	10,583		6.2%
1980	14,098		33.2%
1990	14,939		6.0%
2000	18,376		23.0%
2010	20,428		11.2%
2020	21,344		4.5%
2025 (est.)	22,369	▲	4.8%
U.S. Decennial Census; 1790–1960 1900–1990; 1990–2000 2010–2020

As of the third quarter of 2024, the median home value in Hubbard County was $274,700.

As of the 2023 American Community Survey, there are 8,885 estimated households in Hubbard County with an average of 2.41 persons per household. The county has a median household income of $70,622. About 10.7% of the county's population lives at or below the poverty line. Hubbard County has an estimated 57.0% employment rate, with 30.5% of the population holding a bachelor's degree or higher and 94.6% a high school diploma.

The top five reported ancestries (people were allowed to report up to two ancestries, so the figures sum to more than 100%) were English (97.0%), Spanish (1.1%), Indo-European (1.0%), Asian and Pacific Islander (0.3%), and other (0.6%).

=== Racial and ethnic composition ===
Hubbard County, Minnesota – racial and ethnic composition
Note: the US Census treats Hispanic/Latino as an ethnic category. This table excludes Latinos from the racial categories and assigns them to a separate category. Hispanics/Latinos may be of any race.

Race / ethnicity (NH = non-Hispanic)	Pop. 1980	Pop. 1990	Pop. 2000	Pop. 2010	Pop. 2020
White alone (NH)	13,743 (97.48%)	14,609 (97.79%)	17,625 (95.91%)	19,122 (93.61%)	19,139 (89.67%)
Black or African American alone (NH)	8 (0.06%)	4 (0.03%)	32 (0.17%)	47 (0.23%)	82 (0.38%)
Native American or Alaska Native alone (NH)	248 (1.76%)	276 (1.85%)	381 (2.07%)	525 (2.57%)	560 (2.62%)
Asian alone (NH)	51 (0.36%)	13 (0.09%)	47 (0.26%)	49 (0.24%)	66 (0.31%)
Pacific Islander alone (NH)	—	—	1 (0.01%)	1 (0.00%)	12 (0.06%)
Other race alone (NH)	5 (0.04%)	0 (0.00%)	8 (0.04%)	15 (0.07%)	56 (0.26%)
Mixed race or multiracial (NH)	—	—	158 (0.86%)	342 (1.67%)	940 (4.40%)
Hispanic or Latino (any race)	43 (0.31%)	37 (0.25%)	124 (0.67%)	327 (1.60%)	489 (2.29%)
Total	14,098 (100.00%)	14,939 (100.00%)	18,376 (100.00%)	20,428 (100.00%)	21,344 (100.00%)

=== 2023 estimate ===
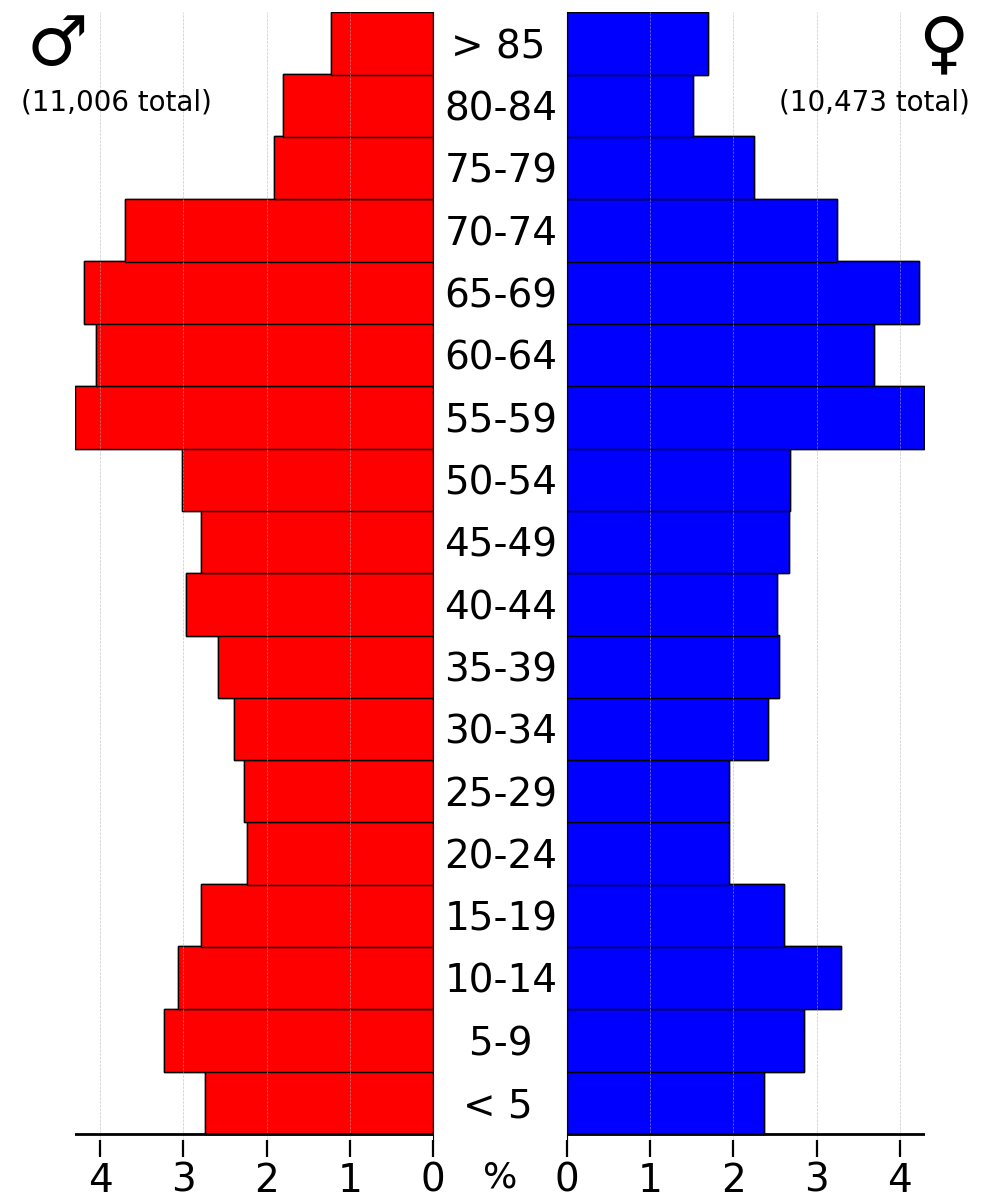
2022 US Census population pyramid for Hubbard County, from ACS 5-year estimates

As of the 2023 estimate, there were 22,132 people and 8,885 households residing in the county. There were 14,792 housing units. The racial makeup of the county was 93.5% White (91.6% NH White), 0.6% African American, 2.9% Native American, 0.5% Asian, 0.1% Pacific Islander, and 2.4% from two or more races. Hispanic or Latino people of any race were 2.8% of the population.

In the 2023 estimate, Hubbard County is Minnesota's 39th-wealthiest county, with a $57,515 per capita income.

=== 2020 census ===
As of the 2020 census, the county had a population of 21,344. The median age was 46.9 years. 22.4% of residents were under the age of 18 and 25.2% of residents were 65 years of age or older. For every 100 females there were 101.4 males, and for every 100 females age 18 and over there were 100.3 males age 18 and over.

The racial makeup of the county was 90.3% White, 0.4% Black or African American, 2.7% American Indian and Alaska Native, 0.3% Asian, 0.1% Native Hawaiian and Pacific Islander, 1.1% from some other race, and 5.2% from two or more races. Hispanic or Latino residents of any race comprised 2.3% of the population.

100.0% of residents lived in rural areas.

There were 8,885 households in the county, of which 24.9% had children under the age of 18 living in them. Of all households, 53.6% were married-couple households, 18.5% were households with a male householder and no spouse or partner present, and 20.6% were households with a female householder and no spouse or partner present. About 27.8% of all households were made up of individuals and 14.2% had someone living alone who was 65 years of age or older.

There were 14,705 housing units, of which 39.6% were vacant. Among occupied housing units, 80.1% were owner-occupied and 19.9% were renter-occupied. The homeowner vacancy rate was 1.6% and the rental vacancy rate was 8.2%.

=== 2010 census ===
As of the 2010 census, there were 20,428 people, 8,659 households, and _ families residing in the county. The population density was 22.1 inhabitants per square mile (8.5/km^{2}). There were 14,618 housing units at an average density of 15.8 per square mile (6.1/km^{2}). The racial makeup of the county was 94.53% White, 0.23% African American, 2.73% Native American, 0.24% Asian, 0.01% Pacific Islander, 0.45% from some other races and 1.79% from two or more races. Hispanic or Latino people of any race were 1.60% of the population.

=== 2000 census ===
As of the 2000 census, there were 18,376 people, 7,435 households, and 5,345 families in the county. The population density was 19.9 inhabitants per square mile (7.7/km^{2}). There were 12,229 housing units at an average density of 13.3 per square mile (5.1/km^{2}). The racial makeup of the county was 96.31% White, 0.17% African American, 2.13% Native American, 0.27% Asian, 0.01% Pacific Islander, 0.22% from some other races and 0.89% from two or more races. Hispanic or Latino people of any race were 0.67% of the population.

In terms of ancestry, 35.0% were of German, 20.5% Norwegian, 6.0% English, and 5.8% Swedish ancestry.

There were 7,435 households, of which 29.30% had children under the age of 18 living with them, 61.10% were married couples living together, 7.10% had a female householder with no husband present, and 28.10% were non-families. 24.20% of all households were made up of individuals, and 11.30% had someone living alone who was 65 years of age or older. The average household size was 2.45 and the average family size was 2.88.

The county population contained 24.60% under the age of 18, 6.40% from 18 to 24, 24.10% from 25 to 44, 26.90% from 45 to 64, and 18.00% who were 65 years of age or older. The median age was 42 years. For every 100 females there were 99.90 males. For every 100 females age 18 and over, there were 98.00 males.

The median income for a household in the county was $35,321, and the median income for a family was $41,177. Males had a median income of $30,030 versus $21,616 for females. The per capita income for the county was $18,115. 9.70% of the population and 7.50% of families were below the poverty line. 12.50% of those under the age of 18 and 9.30% of those 65 and older were living below the poverty line.

== Communities ==
=== Cities ===
- Akeley
- Laporte
- Nevis
- Park Rapids

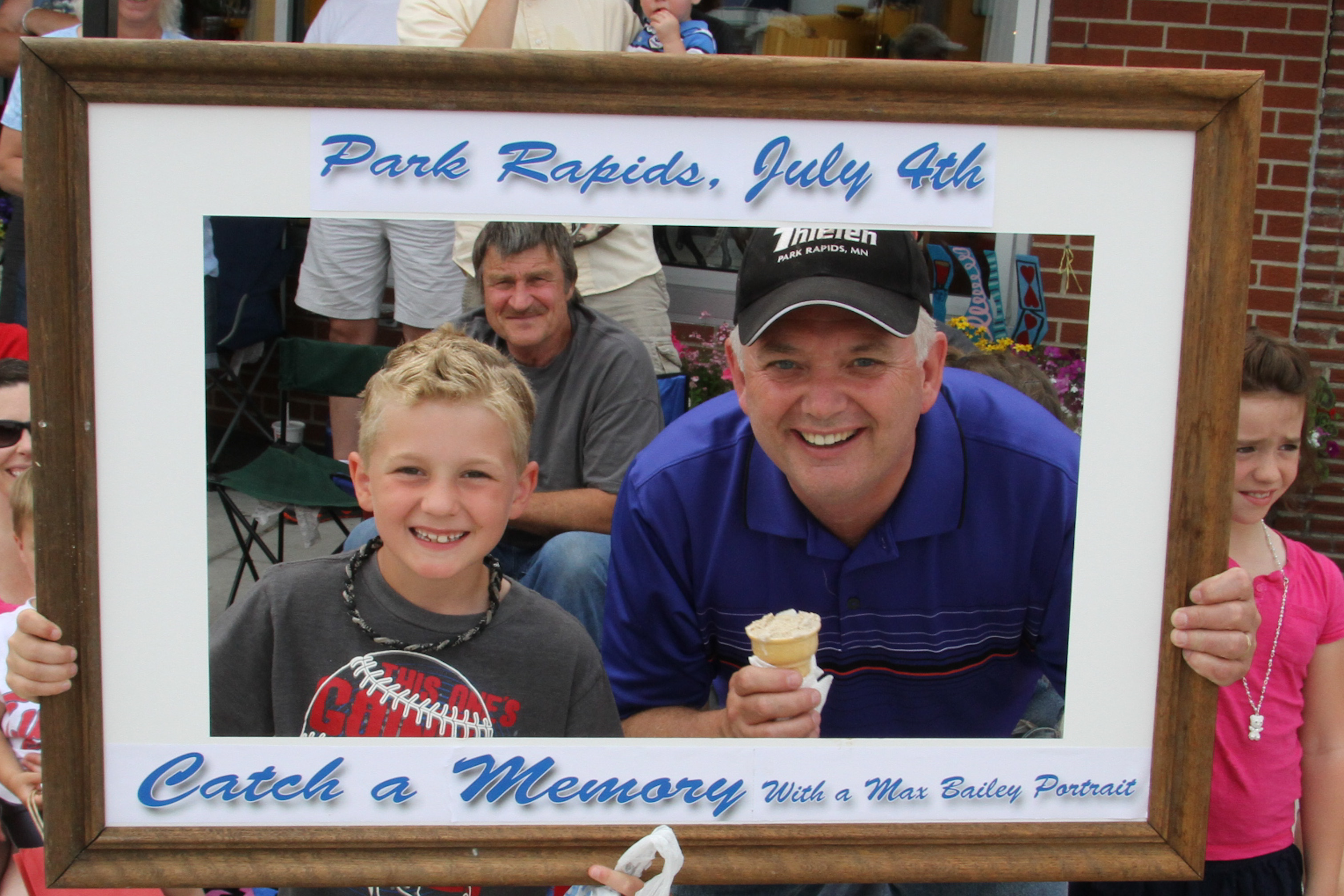
July 4th Park Rapids Parade

=== Census-designated places ===
- Hubbard
- Lake George

=== Unincorporated communities ===
- Badoura
- Becida
- Benedict
- Chamberlain
- Dorset
- Emmaville
- Kabekona
- Nary

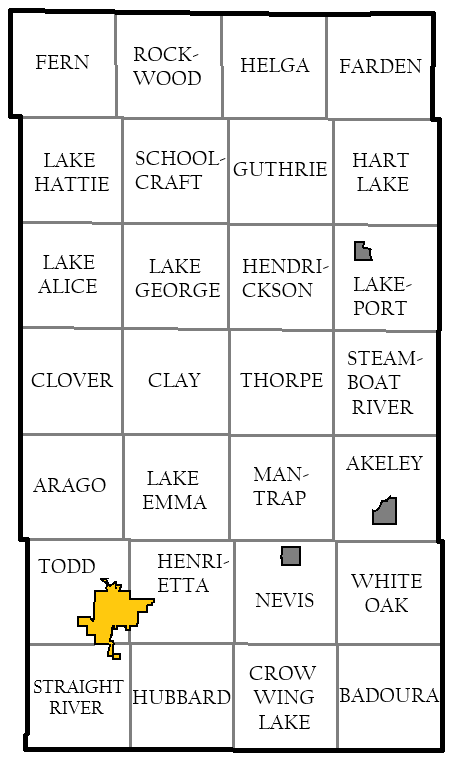
Townships of Hubbard County

=== Townships ===
- Akeley Township
- Arago Township
- Badoura Township
- Clay Township
- Clover Township
- Crow Wing Lake Township
- Farden Township
- Fern Township
- Guthrie Township
- Hart Lake Township
- Helga Township
- Hendrickson Township
- Henrietta Township
- Hubbard Township
- Lake Alice Township
- Lake Emma Township
- Lake George Township
- Lake Hattie Township
- Lakeport Township
- Mantrap Township
- Nevis Township
- Rockwood Township
- Schoolcraft Township
- Steamboat River Township
- Straight River Township
- Thorpe Township
- Todd Township
- White Oak Township

== Government and politics ==
Hubbard County voters have leaned toward the Republican nominee in presidential elections for several decades. As of 2020, the county has selected the Republican nominee in 78% of elections since 1980.

United States presidential election results for Hubbard County, Minnesota
Year	Republican		Democratic		Third party(ies)	
Year	No.	%	No.	%	No.	%
1892	164	35.65%	129	28.04%	167	36.30%
1896	364	49.73%	344	46.99%	24	3.28%
1900	1,009	66.12%	464	30.41%	53	3.47%
1904	1,392	79.95%	232	13.33%	117	6.72%
1908	1,288	69.10%	401	21.51%	175	9.39%
1912	359	21.20%	450	26.58%	884	52.22%
1916	685	40.39%	799	47.11%	212	12.50%
1920	2,238	73.84%	453	14.95%	340	11.22%
1924	1,884	57.81%	191	5.86%	1,184	36.33%
1928	2,291	65.76%	1,120	32.15%	73	2.10%
1932	1,349	35.96%	2,230	59.45%	172	4.59%
1936	1,618	39.83%	2,312	56.92%	132	3.25%
1940	2,544	54.00%	2,141	45.45%	26	0.55%
1944	2,114	56.52%	1,613	43.13%	13	0.35%
1948	2,071	48.83%	2,044	48.20%	126	2.97%
1952	3,099	68.97%	1,360	30.27%	34	0.76%
1956	2,453	62.69%	1,454	37.16%	6	0.15%
1960	2,749	57.43%	2,029	42.39%	9	0.19%
1964	2,283	47.14%	2,553	52.72%	7	0.14%
1968	2,720	54.95%	1,920	38.79%	310	6.26%
1972	3,294	59.31%	2,136	38.46%	124	2.23%
1976	2,985	46.00%	3,196	49.25%	308	4.75%
1980	4,172	55.53%	2,840	37.80%	501	6.67%
1984	4,621	61.76%	2,806	37.50%	55	0.74%
1988	4,365	56.42%	3,306	42.74%	65	0.84%
1992	3,227	37.57%	3,362	39.14%	2,000	23.29%
1996	3,593	41.25%	3,802	43.65%	1,316	15.11%
2000	5,307	55.21%	3,632	37.78%	674	7.01%
2004	6,444	56.83%	4,741	41.81%	155	1.37%
2008	6,558	56.35%	4,872	41.86%	208	1.79%
2012	6,622	57.48%	4,676	40.59%	222	1.93%
2016	7,261	63.11%	3,423	29.75%	821	7.14%
2020	8,202	63.26%	4,462	34.42%	301	2.32%
2024	8,809	64.69%	4,536	33.31%	272	2.00%

County Board of Commissioners
Position	Name	District
Commissioner	David De La Hunt	District 1
Commissioner	Charlene Christenson	District 2
Commissioner	Tom Krueger	District 3
Commissioner	Vacant	District 4
Commissioner	Ted Van Kempen	District 5

State Legislature (2018-2020)
Position	Name	Affiliation	District
Senate	Paul Utke	Republican	District 2
House of Representatives	Matt Grossell	Republican	District 2A
House of Representatives	Steve Green	Republican	District 2B

U.S Congress (2018-2020)
Position	Name	Affiliation	District
House of Representatives	Pete Stauber	Republican	8th
Senate	Amy Klobuchar	Democrat	N/A
Senate	Tina Smith	Democrat	N/A

== See also ==
- National Register of Historic Places listings in Hubbard County, Minnesota
