= Clay Township, Hubbard County, Minnesota =

Clay Township, Minnesota
- Township
- Location of Clay County, within Hubbard County, Minnesota
- Coordinates: 47°4′47″N 94°57′16″W
- Country: United States
- State: Minnesota
- County: Hubbard

Area
  - Total: 36.1 sq mi (93.6 km^{2})
  - Land: 33.4 sq mi (86.5 km^{2})
  - Water: 2.7 sq mi (7.1 km^{2})
- Elevation: 1,540 ft (470 m)

Population (2020)
  - Total: 76
  - Density: 2.3/sq mi (0.88/km^{2})
- Time zone: UTC-6 (Central (CST))
  - Summer (DST): UTC-5 (CDT)
- FIPS code: 27-11682
- GNIS feature ID: 0663811
- Website: https://claytownship.us/

Clay Township is a township in Hubbard County, Minnesota, United States. The population was 76 at the 2020 census.

Clay Township was named for natural deposits of clay within its borders.

== Geography ==
According to the United States Census Bureau, the township has a total area of 36.1 square miles (93 km^{2}), of which 33.4 square miles (87 km^{2}) is land and 2.7 square miles (7.0 km^{2}) (7.56%) is water.

== Demographics ==
As of the census of 2000, there were 49 people, 23 households, and 16 families residing in the township. The population density was 1.5 inhabitants per square mile (0.58/km^{2}). There were 116 housing units at an average density of 3.5 per square mile (1.4/km^{2}). The racial makeup of the township was 97.96% White and 2.04% Native American.

There were 23 households, out of which 13.0% had children under the age of 18 living with them, 65.2% were married couples living together, 4.3% had a female householder with no husband present, and 30.4% were non-families. 26.1% of all households were made up of individuals, and none had someone living alone who was 65 years of age or older. The average household size was 2.13 and the average family size was 2.56.

In the township the population was spread out, with 8.2% under the age of 18, 4.1% from 18 to 24, 20.4% from 25 to 44, 51.0% from 45 to 64, and 16.3% who were 65 years of age or older. The median age was 52 years. For every 100 females, there were 88.5 males. For every 100 females age 18 and over, there were 95.7 males.

The median income for a household in the township was $36,250, and the median income for a family was $45,625. Males had a median income of $30,750 versus $23,750 for females. The per capita income for the township was $28,130. There were no families and 5.4% of the population lived below the poverty line, including no under eighteens and none of those over 64.
