= McNary (surname) =

McNary is a surname. Notable people with the surname include:

- Charles L. McNary (1874–1944), U.S. Republican politician
- Dishon McNary (born 1997), American football player
- John Hugh McNary (1867–1936), U.S. federal district court judge
- Josh McNary (born 1988), American football player
- William S. McNary (1863–1930), U.S. Representative
