= Schoolcraft Township, Hubbard County, Minnesota =

Schoolcraft Township, Minnesota
- Township
- Location of Schoolcraft Township, within Hubbard County, Minnesota
- Coordinates: 47°17′0″N 94°58′37″W
- Country: United States
- State: Minnesota
- County: Hubbard

Area
  - Total: 35.3 sq mi (91.5 km^{2})
  - Land: 34.5 sq mi (89.4 km^{2})
  - Water: 0.81 sq mi (2.1 km^{2})
- Elevation: 1,371 ft (418 m)

Population (2020)
  - Total: 136
  - Density: 3.94/sq mi (1.52/km^{2})
- Time zone: UTC-6 (Central (CST))
  - Summer (DST): UTC-5 (CDT)
- FIPS code: 27-58972
- GNIS feature ID: 0665567

Schoolcraft Township is a township in Hubbard County, Minnesota, United States. The population was 136 at the 2020 census.

Schoolcraft Township took its name from the Schoolcraft River.

== Geography ==
According to the United States Census Bureau, the township has a total area of 35.3 square miles (91.5 km^{2}), of which 34.5 square miles (89.4 km^{2}) is land and 0.8 square mile (2.1 km^{2}) (2.32%) is water.

== Demographics ==
As of the census of 2000, there were 106 people, 39 households, and 32 families residing in the township. The population density was 3.1 people per square mile (1.2/km^{2}). There were 69 housing units at an average density of 2.0/sq mi (0.8/km^{2}). The racial makeup of the township was 97.17% White, 1.89% Asian, and 0.94% from two or more races. Hispanic or Latino of any race were 0.94% of the population.

There were 39 households, out of which 38.5% had children under the age of 18 living with them, 76.9% were married couples living together, 5.1% had a female householder with no husband present, and 15.4% were non-families. 15.4% of all households were made up of individuals, and 5.1% had someone living alone who was 65 years of age or older. The average household size was 2.72 and the average family size was 3.00.

In the township the population was spread out, with 25.5% under the age of 18, 5.7% from 18 to 24, 30.2% from 25 to 44, 30.2% from 45 to 64, and 8.5% who were 65 years of age or older. The median age was 40 years. For every 100 females, there were 112.0 males. For every 100 females age 18 and over, there were 113.5 males.

The median income for a household in the township was $36,250, and the median income for a family was $50,625. Males had a median income of $31,250 versus $43,750 for females. The per capita income for the township was $14,103. There were 11.8% of families and 17.1% of the population living below the poverty line, including 33.3% of under eighteens and none of those over 64.
