= Helga Township, Hubbard County, Minnesota =

Helga Township, Minnesota
- Township
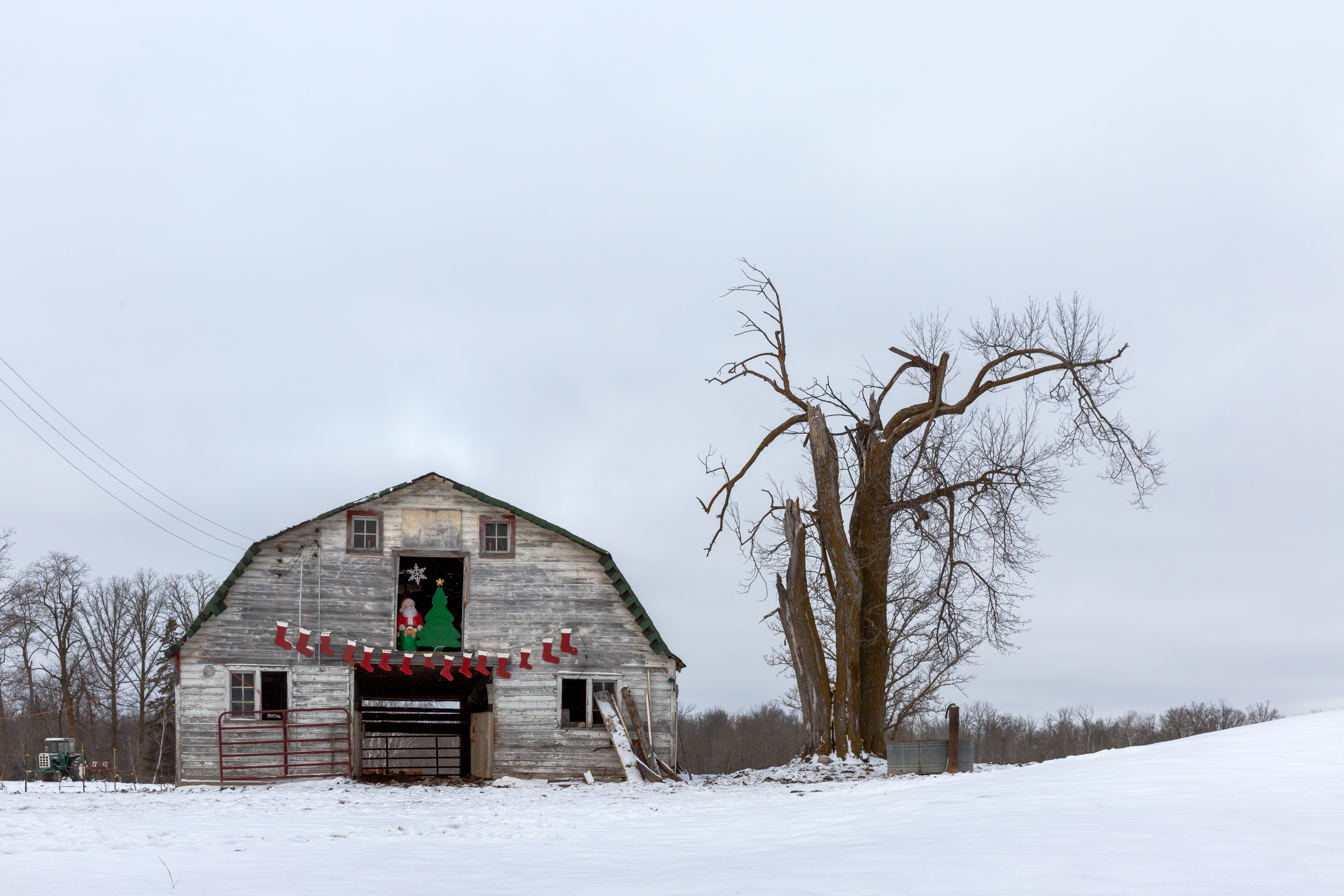
- Barn in Helga

- Location of Helga Township, within Hubbard County, Minnesota
- Coordinates: 47°21′9″N 94°51′13″W
- Country: United States
- State: Minnesota
- County: Hubbard

Area
  - Total: 35.6 sq mi (92.3 km^{2})
  - Land: 33.2 sq mi (85.9 km^{2})
  - Water: 2.5 sq mi (6.4 km^{2})
- Elevation: 1,480 ft (451 m)

Population (2020)
  - Total: 1,648
  - Density: 49.7/sq mi (19.2/km^{2})
- Time zone: UTC-6 (Central (CST))
  - Summer (DST): UTC-5 (CDT)
- FIPS code: 27-28340
- GNIS feature ID: 0664444
- Website: https://helgatownship.org/

Helga Township is a township in Hubbard County, Minnesota, United States. The population was 1,648 at the 2020 census.

Helga Township was given the name of one of the first white children born within its borders.

== Geography ==
According to the United States Census Bureau, the township has a total area of 35.7 square miles (92 km^{2}), of which 33.2 square miles (86 km^{2}) is land and 2.5 square miles (6.5 km^{2}) (6.93%) is water.

== Demographics ==
As of the census of 2000, there were 1,109 people, 384 households, and 324 families residing in the township. The population density was 33.4 inhabitants per square mile (12.9/km^{2}). There were 430 housing units at an average density of 13.0 per square mile (5.0/km^{2}). The racial makeup of the township was 95.67% White, 2.71% Native American, 0.45% Asian, and 1.17% from two or more races. Hispanic or Latino of any race were 0.72% of the population.

There were 384 households, out of which 41.1% had children under the age of 18 living with them, 76.8% were married couples living together, 4.7% had a female householder with no husband present, and 15.6% were non-families. 13.3% of all households were made up of individuals, and 3.9% had someone living alone who was 65 years of age or older. The average household size was 2.89 and the average family size was 3.15.

In the township the population was spread out, with 29.5% under the age of 18, 7.4% from 18 to 24, 29.8% from 25 to 44, 26.1% from 45 to 64, and 7.3% who were 65 years of age or older. The median age was 37 years. For every 100 females, there were 105.8 males. For every 100 females age 18 and over, there were 108.5 males.

The median income for a household in the township was $46,645, and the median income for a family was $50,000. Males had a median income of $33,333 versus $21,726 for females. The per capita income for the township was $19,410. About 3.8% of families and 5.4% of the population were below the poverty line, including 5.0% of those under age 18 and 2.5% of those age 65 or over.
