= Lake Emma Township, Hubbard County, Minnesota =

Lake Emma Township, Minnesota
- Township
- Location of Lake Emma Township, within Hubbard County, Minnesota
- Coordinates: 47°0′52″N 94°57′21″W
- Country: United States
- State: Minnesota
- County: Hubbard

Area
  - Total: 36.1 sq mi (93.5 km^{2})
  - Land: 27.3 sq mi (70.8 km^{2})
  - Water: 8.8 sq mi (22.7 km^{2})
- Elevation: 1,440 ft (440 m)

Population (2020)
  - Total: 965
  - Density: 35.3/sq mi (13.6/km^{2})
- Time zone: UTC-6 (Central (CST))
  - Summer (DST): UTC-5 (CDT)
- ZIP code: 56470
- Area code: 218
- FIPS code: 27-34262
- GNIS feature ID: 0664671
- Website: https://www.lakeemmatwp.com/

Lake Emma Township is a township in Hubbard County, Minnesota, United States. The population was 965 at the 2020 census.

== Geography ==
According to the United States Census Bureau, the township has a total area of 36.1 square miles (93 km^{2}), of which 27.3 square miles (71 km^{2}) is land and 8.8 square miles (23 km^{2}) (24.31%) is water.

== Demographics ==
As of the census of 2000, there were 900 people, 379 households, and 300 families residing in the township. The population density was 32.9 inhabitants per square mile (12.7/km^{2}). There were 973 housing units at an average density of 35.6 per square mile (13.7/km^{2}). The racial makeup of the township was 99.11% White, 0.22% Native American, 0.11% from other races, and 0.56% from two or more races. Hispanic or Latino of any race were 0.56% of the population.

There were 379 households, out of which 24.0% had children under the age of 18 living with them, 72.8% were married couples living together, 3.7% had a female householder with no husband present, and 20.6% were non-families. 18.2% of all households were made up of individuals, and 6.9% had someone living alone who was 65 years of age or older. The average household size was 2.37 and the average family size was 2.66.

In the township the population was spread out, with 19.8% under the age of 18, 4.8% from 18 to 24, 20.3% from 25 to 44, 34.8% from 45 to 64, and 20.3% who were 65 years of age or older. The median age was 48 years. For every 100 females, there were 99.6 males. For every 100 females age 18 and over, there were 96.2 males.

The median income for a household in the township was $45,563, and the median income for a family was $49,375. Males had a median income of $35,000 versus $22,188 for females. The per capita income for the township was $25,380. About 4.3% of families and 5.3% of the population were below the poverty line, including 7.0% of those under age 18 and 2.2% of those age 65 or over.
