= Clover Township, Hubbard County, Minnesota =

Clover Township, Minnesota
- Township
- Location of Clover Township, within Hubbard County, Minnesota
- Coordinates: 47°6′13″N 95°7′49″W
- Country: United States
- State: Minnesota
- County: Hubbard

Area
  - Total: 35.6 sq mi (92.3 km^{2})
  - Land: 33.8 sq mi (87.5 km^{2})
  - Water: 1.9 sq mi (4.8 km^{2})
- Elevation: 1,539 ft (469 m)

Population (2020)
  - Total: 125
  - Density: 3.70/sq mi (1.43/km^{2})
- Time zone: UTC-6 (Central (CST))
  - Summer (DST): UTC-5 (CDT)
- FIPS code: 27-12232
- GNIS feature ID: 0663835

Clover Township is a township in Hubbard County, Minnesota, United States. The population was 125 at the 2020 census.

Clover Township was named for the white clover growing within its borders.

== Geography ==
According to the United States Census Bureau, the township has a total area of 35.6 square miles (92 km^{2}), of which 33.8 square miles (88 km^{2}) is land and 1.8 square miles (4.7 km^{2}) (5.16%) is water.

== Demographics ==
As of the census of 2000, there were 134 people, 61 households, and 43 families residing in the township. The population density was 4.0 inhabitants per square mile (1.5/km^{2}). There were 138 housing units at an average density of 4.1 per square mile (1.6/km^{2}). The racial makeup of the township was 100.00% White.

There were 61 households, out of which 21.3% had children under the age of 18 living with them, 60.7% were married couples living together, 4.9% had a female householder with no husband present, and 29.5% were non-families. 24.6% of all households were made up of individuals, and 13.1% had someone living alone who was 65 years of age or older. The average household size was 2.20 and the average family size was 2.60.

In the township the population was spread out, with 15.7% under the age of 18, 9.0% from 18 to 24, 13.4% from 25 to 44, 35.8% from 45 to 64, and 26.1% who were 65 years of age or older. The median age was 52 years. For every 100 females, there were 109.4 males. For every 100 females age 18 and over, there were 105.5 males.

The median income for a household in the township was $32,500, and the median income for a family was $43,750. Males had a median income of $27,500 versus $20,625 for females. The per capita income for the township was $17,723. There were 7.1% of families and 5.8% of the population living below the poverty line, including no under eighteens and 14.3% of those over 64.
