= Arago Township, Hubbard County, Minnesota =

Arago Township, Minnesota
- Township
- Location of Arago Township, within Hubbard County, Minnesota
- Coordinates: 47°1′53″N 95°6′21″W
- Country: United States
- State: Minnesota
- County: Hubbard

Area
  - Total: 35.4 sq mi (91.6 km^{2})
  - Land: 31.0 sq mi (80.2 km^{2})
  - Water: 4.4 sq mi (11.5 km^{2})
- Elevation: 1,470 ft (448 m)

Population (2020)
  - Total: 606
  - Density: 19.6/sq mi (7.56/km^{2})
- Time zone: UTC-6 (Central (CST))
  - Summer (DST): UTC-5 (CDT)
- ZIP code: 56470
- Area code: 218
- FIPS code: 27-01918
- GNIS feature ID: 0663447
- Website: https://aragotownshipmn.gov/

Arago Township is a township in Hubbard County, Minnesota, United States. The population was 606 at the 2020 census.

Arago Township was named for François Arago, a French scientist.

== Geography ==
According to the United States Census Bureau, the township has a total area of 35.4 square miles (92 km^{2}), of which 31.0 square miles (80 km^{2}) are land and 4.4 square miles (11 km^{2}) (12.50%) are water.

== Demographics ==
As of the census of 2000, there were 586 people, 244 households, and 184 families residing in the township. The population density was 18.9 inhabitants per square mile (7.3/km^{2}). There were 456 housing units at an average density of 14.7 per square mile (5.7/km^{2}). The racial makeup of the township was 98.29% White, 0.51% Native American, 0.34% Asian, 0.34% from other races, and 0.51% from two or more races. Hispanic or Latino of any race were 0.51% of the population.

There were 244 households, out of which 23.8% had children under the age of 18 living with them, 69.7% were married couples living together, 2.9% had a female householder with no husband present, and 24.2% were non-families. 18.9% of all households were made up of individuals, and 6.6% had someone living alone who was 65 years of age or older. The average household size was 2.40 and the average family size was 2.75.

In the township the population was spread out, with 21.2% under the age of 18, 3.9% from 18 to 24, 22.4% from 25 to 44, 32.6% from 45 to 64, and 20.0% who were 65 years of age or older. The median age was 46 years. For every 100 females, there were 107.1 males. For every 100 females age 18 and over, there were 103.5 males.

The median income for a household in the township was $40,865, and the median income for a family was $50,104. Males had a median income of $30,673 versus $21,000 for females. The per capita income for the township was $17,562. About 6.9% of families and 12.9% of the population were below the poverty line, including 24.8% of those under age 18 and 6.7% of those age 65 or over.
