= Laporte, Minnesota =

City in Minnesota, United States

Laporte
- City
- Location of Laporte, Minnesota
- Coordinates: 47°12′50″N 94°45′18″W
- Country: United States
- State: Minnesota
- County: Hubbard

Area
  - Total: 0.70 sq mi (1.82 km^{2})
  - Land: 0.70 sq mi (1.82 km^{2})
  - Water: 0 sq mi (0.00 km^{2})
- Elevation: 1,352 ft (412 m)

Population (2020)
  - Total: 134
  - Estimate (2021): 139
  - Density: 190.8/sq mi (73.66/km^{2})
- Time zone: UTC-6 (CST)
  - Summer (DST): UTC-5 (CDT)
- ZIP code: 56461
- Area code: 218
- FIPS code: 27-35612
- GNIS feature ID: 0656948

Laporte (/ləˈpɔːrt/ lə-PORT) is a city in Hubbard County, Minnesota, United States. The population was 134 at the 2020 census.

== History ==
The city of Laporte was founded in 1901 and incorporated as a city in 1908. The city had a period of prosperity where it had a train depot, a hotel (which was torn down to make a filling station), a bank (which was subject to an explosion in the 1930s), and a pickle factory (which burned down in the first half of the 20th century). Also during this period, the city of Laporte had a jail, of which it only had one inmate, who subsequently escaped via breaking a hole through the roof of the jail; after this incident all further inmates were sent to Bemidji.

== Geography ==
According to the United States Census Bureau, the city has a total area of 0.70 square miles (1.81 km^{2}), all land.

Minnesota State Highway 200 serves as a main route in the community, and Minnesota State Highways 64 and 371 are nearby.

== Demographics ==
Historical population
Census	Pop.	Note	%±
1910	140		—
1920	216		54.3%
1930	185		−14.4%
1940	213		15.1%
1950	189		−11.3%
1960	155		−18.0%
1970	154		−0.6%
1980	160		3.9%
1990	101		−36.9%
2000	145		43.6%
2010	111		−23.4%
2020	134		20.7%
2021 (est.)	139		3.7%
U.S. Decennial Census; 2020 Census

=== 2010 census ===
As of the census of 2010, there were 111 people, 55 households, and 30 families living in the city. The population density was 158.6 inhabitants per square mile (61.2/km^{2}). There were 80 housing units at an average density of 114.3 per square mile (44.1/km^{2}). The racial makeup of the city was 87.4% White, 0.9% African American, 4.5% Native American, and 7.2% from two or more races. Hispanic or Latino of any race were 0.9% of the population.

There were 55 households, of which 23.6% had children under the age of 18 living with them, 36.4% were married couples living together, 9.1% had a female householder with no husband present, 9.1% had a male householder with no wife present, and 45.5% were non-families. 32.7% of all households were made up of individuals, and 12.8% had someone living alone who was 65 years of age or older. The average household size was 2.02 and the average family size was 2.40.

The median age in the city was 47.3 years. 16.2% of residents were under the age of 18; 9.9% were between the ages of 18 and 24; 20.7% were from 25 to 44; 37.8% were from 45 to 64; and 15.3% were 65 years of age or older. The gender makeup of the city was 55.0% male and 45.0% female.

=== 2000 census ===
As of the census of 2000, there were 145 people, 57 households, and 38 families living in the city. The population density was 208.1 inhabitants per square mile (80.3/km^{2}). There were 79 housing units at an average density of 113.4 per square mile (43.8/km^{2}). The racial makeup of the city was 95.86% White, 1.38% African American, 0.69% Asian, and 2.07% from two or more races. Hispanic or Latino of any race were 1.38% of the population.

There were 57 households, out of which 42.1% had children under the age of 18 living with them, 49.1% were married couples living together, 15.8% had a female householder with no husband present, and 31.6% were non-families. 24.6% of all households were made up of individuals, and 12.3% had someone living alone who was 65 years of age or older. The average household size was 2.54 and the average family size was 3.03.

In the city, the population was spread out, with 31.7% under the age of 18, 11.7% from 18 to 24, 22.8% from 25 to 44, 19.3% from 45 to 64, and 14.5% who were 65 years of age or older. The median age was 32 years. For every 100 females, there were 110.1 males. For every 100 females age 18 and over, there were 110.6 males.

The median income for a household in the city was $28,500, and the median income for a family was $35,500. Males had a median income of $27,083 versus $15,000 for females. The per capita income for the city was $13,412. There were 15.2% of families and 18.0% of the population living below the poverty line, including 30.6% of under eighteens and 17.9% of those over 64.
