= North American fur trade =

Aspect of the international fur trade

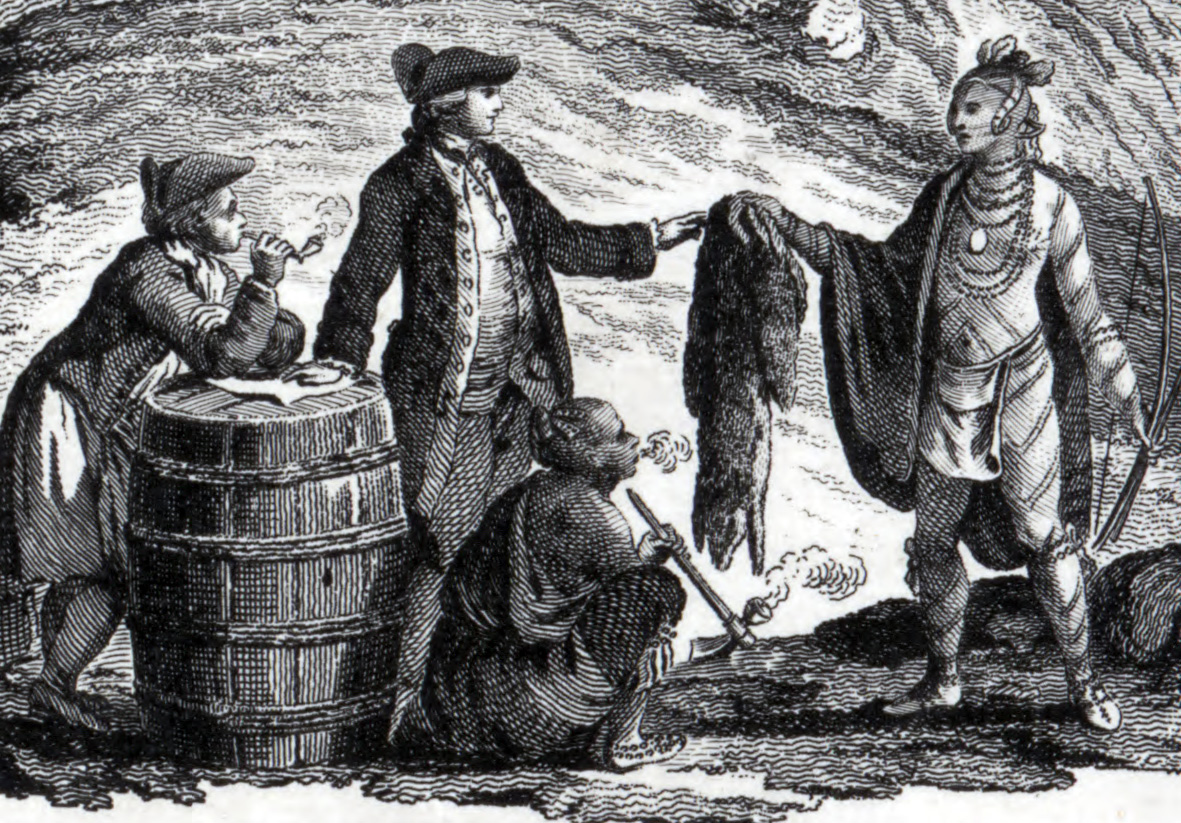
An illustration of European and Indigenous fur traders in North America, 1777

The North American fur trade is the historical commercial trade of furs and other goods in North America between European settlers and the Indigenous communities from the 16th to mid-19th century. The trade initially began in the easternmost provinces of French Canada and northeastern American colonies and later expanded accross the continent reaching the Pacific coast and Alaska. French, Dutch, English, and Scottish settlers and explorers participated in trade and established commercial relationships with the First Nations peoples of the region.

The fur trade became a major economic activity in North America, leading to competition and conflict between settler and Indigenous groups over territorial control and distribution of goods. Goods such as Beaver pelts became popularized fashion in areas of Europe, with significantly expanded the economic need for the trades. Many Indigenous people participated in the commercial transportation of these goods, and exchanged them for European goods such as weaponry, household items, and tools. The trade also facilitated the unions between Indigenous women and European settler men, contributing to the ethnogenesis of the Métis communities in some areas.

In the mid-19th century, the fur trade became an extensive economic network spanning much of North America. the Hudson's Bay Company (HBC) and Northwest Company (NWC) dominated the fur trading field, becoming major monopolies. The fur trade began seeing a decline in the need of furs as the European fashion trend of pelts was quickly going out of style, leading to the decline of many trading posts and companies that relied on the sale of pelts. Various Indigenous and settler communities were affected by this decline as they were dependant on the trade.

Companies such as the HBC switched to a more commercial route after the decline of the fur trade, becoming popular fashion and goods companies.

== Pre-colonial-contact Trade ==
The Indigenous groups residing in North America practiced trade as means of garnering alliances and bonds between societies. Trading was considered as 'gift giving', where one group would give another gifts, and would receive gifts in return. Gifts were used to create alliances between societies in order to foster trust to thus begin trading for necessities and commodities. However, it was not common practice to trade or attempt trade with common enemy societies.

=== Regional trade networks ===
==== British Columbia ====
The availability of valuable and scarce materials and provisions prompted Indigenous communities to trade between each other. Bodies of water served as the main trade routes, as terrain made travel difficult. Within smaller societies, trade was facilitated through a series of small trade to reach a final destination. While larger societies often had emissaries who would transport and trade goods over great distances. This is known as intragroup exchange.

Example of obsidian tool

In pre-contact British Columbia, obsidian was a commodity sought after by many tribes. However, due to a lack of written evidence, it is difficult to uncover exactly how several communities participated in exchange amongst each other. A study done by Roy L. Carlson determines possible trade routes of British Columbian obsidian. Obsidian originating in Oregon, from 9000 (Before Contact) was found near John Day River in British Columbia. From this analysis of carbon dated obsidian, Carlson suggests that the trade began in the northwestern regions of North America around 9000 years ago.

In the last 1500 years preceding contact with Europeans, Carlson suggests that the trade of obsidian in the British Columbia region was halted, or rather affected by epidemics that spread quickly from the north and west regions. These epidemics were due to European contact in other regions of the continent.

However, inland trade between societies continued, and the distribution and use of marine shells was common. The California mussel was the most common species used in the fabrication of tools. the purple-hinged scallop was used in the fabrication of jewelry and beads, as well as pectin shells for childrens toys. The little tust shell was used to make beads and were considered a unit of wealth.

==== Oolichan grease trails ====
Grease trail

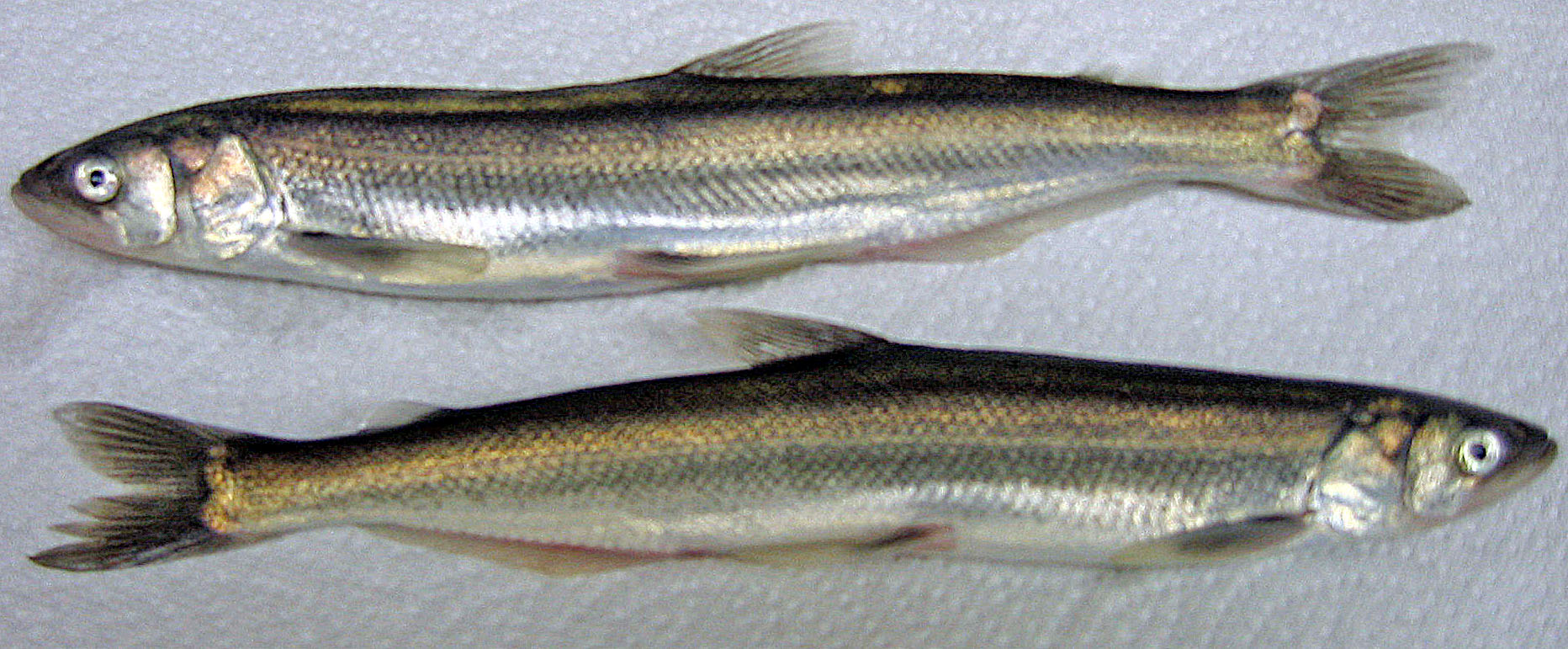
Oolichan (Eulichan) fish

Located near the Pacific coast of North America, the Grease Trails were a series of trade routes initially created for the transportation of Oolichan into more inland regions. Oolichan was a sought after commodity because it could be processed into grease which then could be used for many things such as; salve, seasoning, leather-tanner, and medicine. One box of Oolichan grease could be bartered for a multitude of necessities. The grease trails ranged from present day Yukon and Vancouver, into California. The North Saskatchewan River was a common Oolichan transport route. There were many terrain routes used for trade as well, and were often the easiest routes to cross. However, these terrain trails were mainly trekked on foot as the horse was not a commodity of trade until the later 17th century. The Oolichan grease trails later transformed into fur trade routes in the early 18th century.

==== Nootka-Kwakiutl trade ====
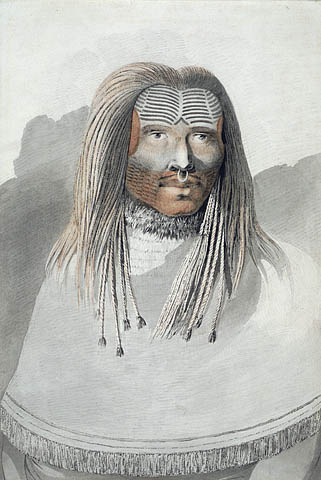
Nootka man

The Nootka People were located on the coast of Vancouver Island, and were primarily fishermen. The Nootka specialized in whale fishing, as whale provided many tradable goods such as blubber and oil. The Nootka participated in trade with the Kwakitul People who resided in the northern parts of Vancouver Island. The two groups exchanged many manufactured goods: The Nootka trading fish, oils, and meat, while the Kwakitul traded tools and metals.

=== Systems of exchange ===
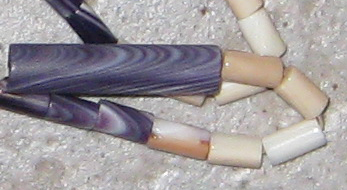
Close up of shells used in the making of Wampum.

==== Wampum ====
In the eastern regions of Canada, many First Nations communities such as the Haudenosaunee, used Wampum as a form of currency. Wampum held value in relation to animal pelts and household goods. Wampum held significant value to British coin as well after contact with the Europeans. Wampum is composed of purple and white shells, often derived from seashells, which are then woven onto string, and often fashioned into belts or sashes. A collection of Wampum beads is known as a fathom. Fathom was used to determine the overall "currency", which was often an arms length of beads.

Example of a fathom.

==== Dentallium ====
Other forms of shells were also used as currency. In westernmost Canada, many of the First Nations communities exchanged dentallium shells. The value of dentallium shells revolved around size and number. Larger Dentallium shells were considered more valuable and had more buying power, this applies to long strings of dentallium shells as well. The fathom measurement was used to determine the purchasing power of the shells. A fathom of dentallium shells could purchase two large ocean-travelling canoes whereas a fathom and a few extra shells could purchase a slave or pelts.

==== Pelts ====
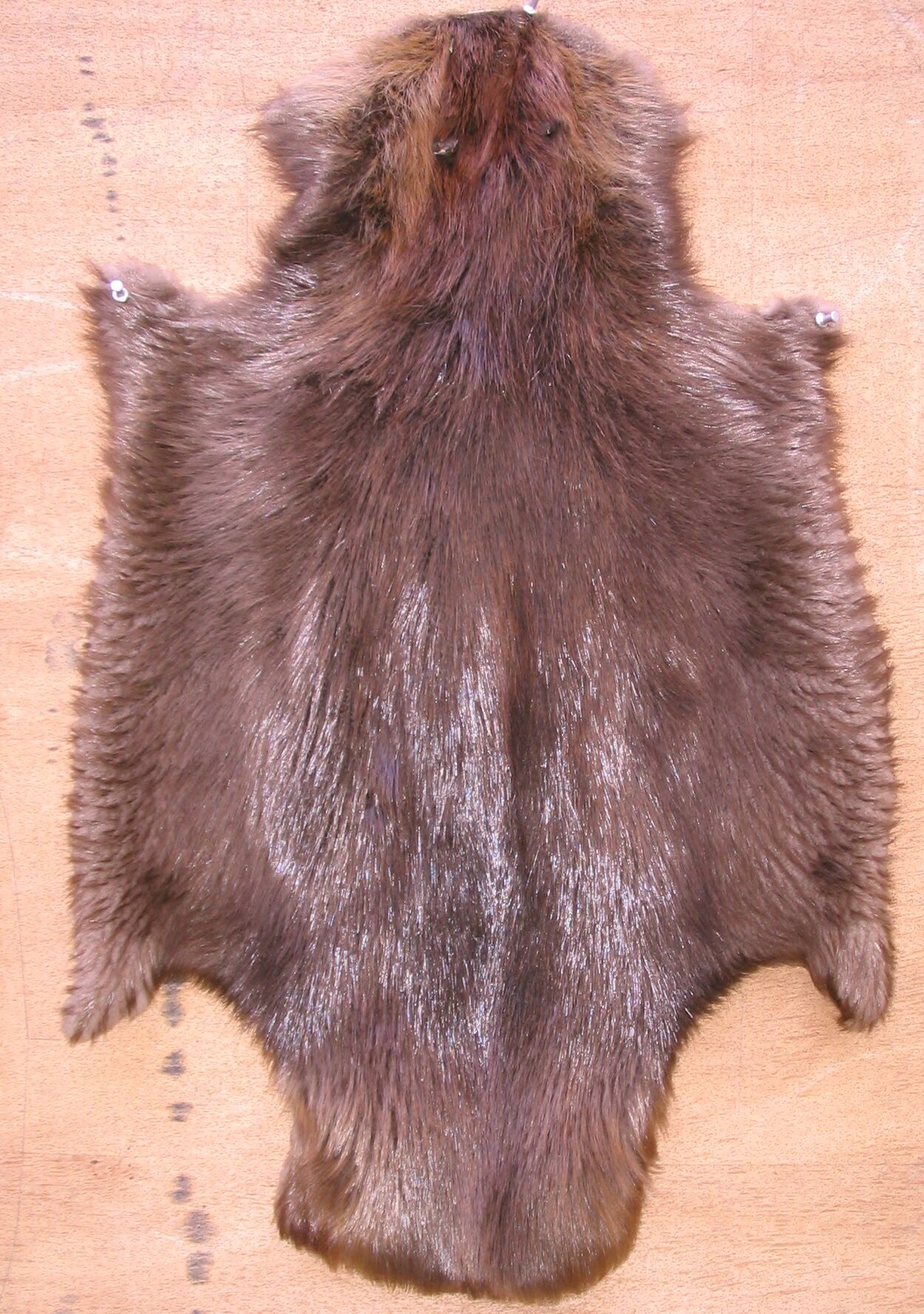
Beaver Pelt

Pelts such as beaver were also a form of currency among Indigenous communities. Beaver pelts were considered useful, as they warm and water resistant, making them a valuable item of exchange.

==== Lopsticks (Gikinawaajichigan) ====
Several Algonquian speaking communities created large wooden poles which were used as points of reference and travelling markers and were also means of communicating among different worlds. Lopsticks were often denuded trees and easily recognizable to the naked eye.

In many western Anishinaabe communities, lopsticks were used as part of a giveaway-ceremony. Gathering ceremonies were most often held in the transition period between seasons and were facilitated by a male elder of medicine man. The gathering ceremonies were a means of wealth distribution between communities; gifts would be placed around a lopstick and distributed according to need. Lopsticks became an important component during the fur trade as they served as trail markers for various trade routes.

== Origins of the fur trade ==
French explorer Jacques Cartier in his three voyages into the Gulf of Saint Lawrence in the 1530s and 1540s conducted some of the earliest fur trading between European and First Nations peoples associated with 16th century and later explorations in North America. Cartier attempted limited fur trading with the First Nations in the Gulf of Saint Lawrence and along the Saint Lawrence River. He concentrated on trading for furs used as trimming and adornment. He overlooked the fur that would become the driving force of the fur trade in the north, the beaver pelt, which would become fashionable in Europe.

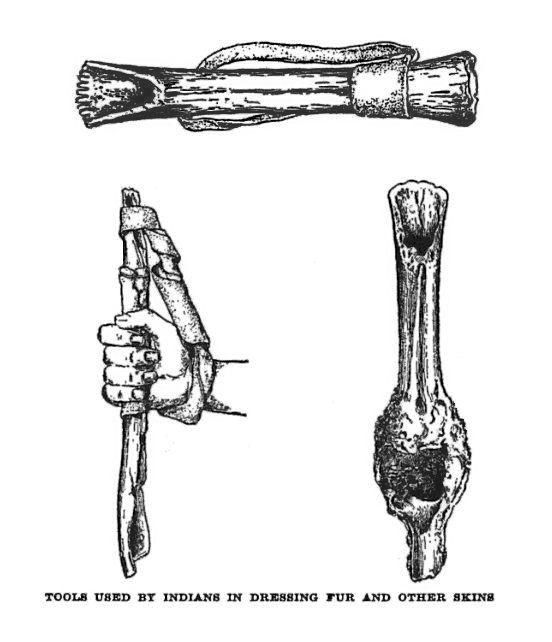
Fur cleaning tools

The earliest European trading for beaver pelts dated to the growing cod fishing industry that spread to the Grand Banks of the North Atlantic in the 16th century. The new preservation technique of drying fish allowed the mainly Basque fishermen to fish near the Newfoundland coast and transport fish back to Europe for sale. The fishermen sought suitable harbors with ample lumber to dry large quantities of cod. This generated their earliest contact with local Indigenous peoples, with whom the fisherman began simple trading.

The fishermen traded metal items for beaver robes made of sewn-together, native-tanned beaver pelts. They used the robes to keep warm on the long, cold return voyages across the Atlantic. These castor gras (in French) became prized by European hat makers in the second half of the 16th century, as they converted the pelts to felt. The discovery of the superior felting qualities of beaver fur, along with the rapidly increasing popularity of beaver felt hats in fashion, transformed the incidental trading of fishermen into a growing trade in the French and later British territories in the 17th century.

== New France in the 17th century ==
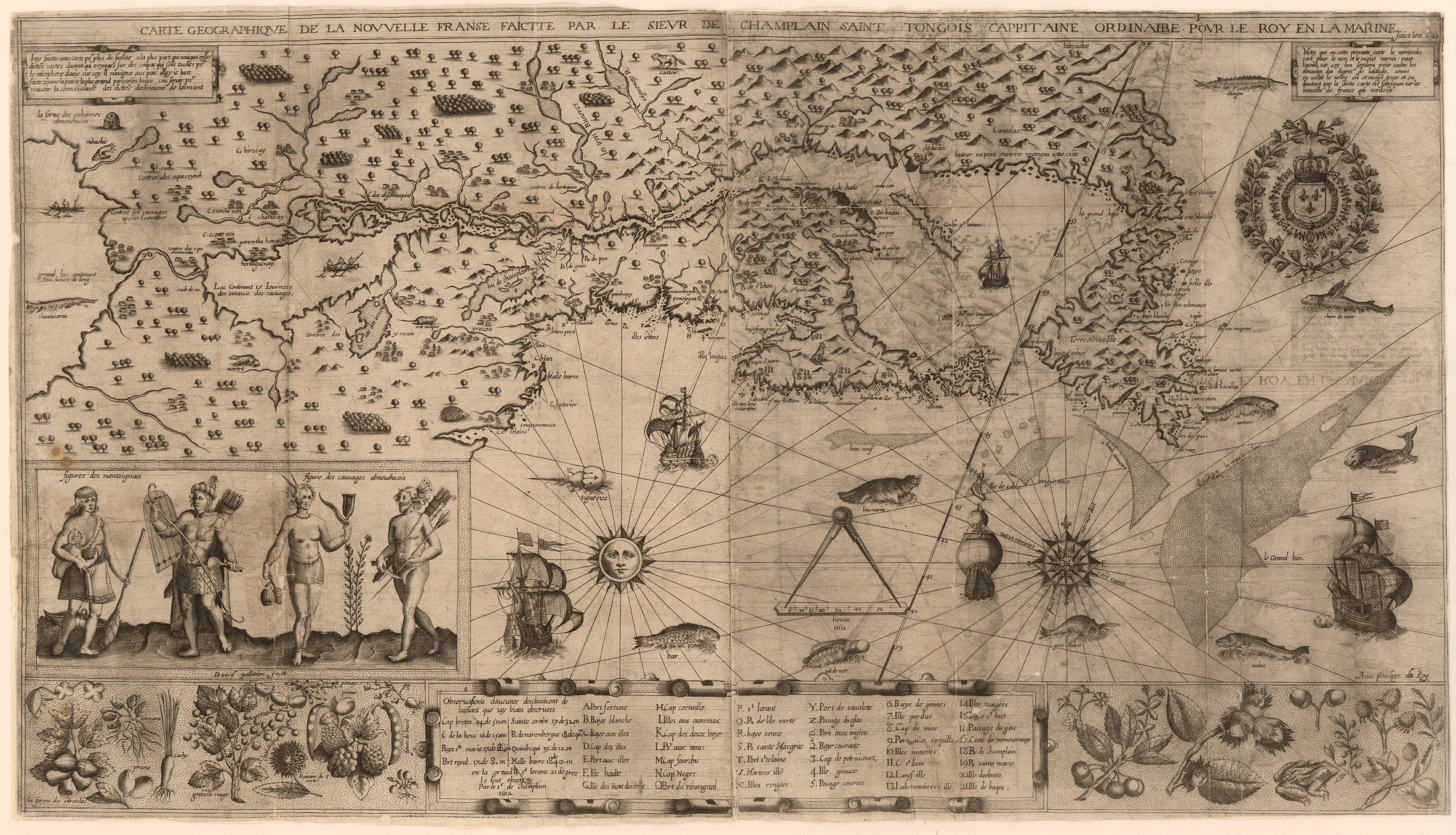
Map of New France (Champlain, 1612)

The transition from a seasonal coastal trade into a permanent interior fur trade was formally marked with the foundation of Quebec on the Saint Lawrence River in 1608 by Samuel de Champlain, officially establishing the settlement of New France. This settlement marked the beginning of the westward movement of French traders from the first permanent settlement of Tadoussac at the mouth of the Saguenay River on the Gulf of Saint Lawrence, up the Saint Lawrence River and into the pays d'en haut (or "upper country") around the Great Lakes. What followed in the first half of the 17th century were strategic moves by both the French and the Indigenous groups to further their own economic and geopolitical ambitions.

Champlain led the expansion while centralizing the French efforts. As native peoples had the primary role of suppliers in the fur trade, Champlain quickly created alliances with the Algonquin, Montagnais (who were located in the territory around Tadoussac), and most importantly, the Huron to the west. The latter, an Iroquoian-speaking people, served as middlemen between the French on the Saint Lawrence and nations in the pays d'en haut. Champlain supported the northern groups in their preexisting military struggle with the Iroquois Confederacy to the south. He secured the Ottawa River route to Georgian Bay, greatly expanding the trade. Champlain also sent young French men to live and work among the natives, most notably Étienne Brûlé, to learn the land, language, and customs, as well as to promote trade.

Champlain reformed the business of the trade, creating the first informal trust in 1613 in response to increasing losses because of competition. The trust was later formalized with a royal charter, leading to a series of trade monopolies during the term of New France. The most notable monopoly was the Company of One Hundred Associates based back in France, with a period of attempted transition towards other share trading companies, such as the Company of Habitants in the 1640s and 1650s, permitting a small group of investors within Canada an initial hold on the monopoly but then quickly pulling back and limiting trading and investment within the colony. While the monopolies dominated the trade, their charters also required payment of annual returns to the national government, military expenditures, and expectations that they would encourage settlement for the sparsely populated New France.

The vast wealth in the fur trade created enforcement problems for the monopoly. Unlicensed independent traders, known as coureurs des bois (or "runners of the woods"), began to do business in the late 17th and early 18th century. Over time, many Métis were drawn to the independent trade; they were the descendants of French trappers and native women. The increasing use of currency, as well as the importance of personal contacts and experience in the fur trade, gave an edge to independent traders over the more bureaucratic monopolies. The newly established English colonies to the south quickly joined the lucrative trade, raiding the Saint Lawrence River valley and capturing and controlling Quebec from 1629 to 1632.

While bringing wealth to a few select French traders and the French regime, the fur trade also brought profound changes to the Indigenous communities living along the Saint Lawrence. European wares, such as iron axe heads, brass kettles, cloth, and firearms were bought with beaver pelts and other furs. The widespread practice of trading furs for rum and whiskey led to problems associated with inebriation and alcohol abuse. The subsequent destruction of beaver populations along the Saint Lawrence heightened the fierce competition between the Iroquois and Huron for access to the rich fur-bearing lands of the Canadian Shield.

The competition for hunting is believed to have contributed to the earlier destruction of the Saint Lawrence Iroquoians in the valley by 1600, likely by the Iroquois Mohawk tribe, who were located closest to them, were more powerful than the Huron, and had the most to gain by controlling this part of the valley.

Iroquois access to firearms through Dutch and later English traders along the Hudson River increased the casualties in the warfare. This greater bloodshed, previously unseen in Iroquoian warfare, increased the practice of "mourning wars". The Iroquois raided neighboring groups to take captives, who were ceremonially adopted as new family members to replace the dead Iroquois; thus a cycle of violence and warfare escalated. More significantly, new infectious diseases brought by the French decimated Native communities. Combined with warfare, disease led to the near destruction of the Huron by 1650.

== Economic expansion of the fur trade and European competition ==
=== Beaver Wars ===
Map of French and British North American possessions in the early 18th century. Note French expansion into Lake Winnipeg and British control of Hudson Bay, both prime fur-producing areas.

During the 1640s and 1650s, the Beaver Wars initiated by the Iroquois forced a massive demographic shift as their western neighbors fled the violence. They sought refuge west and north of Lake Michigan. The Five Nations of the Iroquois, who had a predatory attitude towards their neighbors even at the best of times, constantly raiding neighboring peoples in "mourning wars" in search of captives who would become Iroquois, were determined to be the only middlemen between the Europeans and the other Indians who lived in the West, and quite consciously set about eliminating any rivals as such as the Huron (Wendat).

By the 1620s, the Iroquois had become dependent upon iron implements, which they obtained by trading fur with the Dutch at Fort Nassau (modern Albany, New York). Between 1624 and 1628, the Iroquois drove out their neighbors, the Mahican, to allow themselves to be the one people in the Hudson river valley able to trade with the Dutch. By 1640, the Five Nations had exhausted the supply of beavers in Kanienkeh ("the land of the flint," the Iroquois name for their homeland in what is now upstate New York), and moreover Kanienkeh lacked the beavers with the thick pelts that the Europeans favored and would pay the best price for, which were to be found further north in what is now northern Canada.

The Five Nations launched the "Beaver Wars" to take control of the fur trade from other middlemen who would deal with the Europeans. The Wendat homeland, Wendake, lies in what is now southern Ontario being bordered on three sides by Lake Ontario, Lake Simcoe and Georgian Bay, and it was through Wendake that the Ojibwe and Cree who lived further north traded with the French. In 1649, the Iroquois made a series of raids into Wendake that were intended to destroy the Wendat as a people with thousands of Wendat taken to be adopted by Iroquois families with the rest being killed. The war against the Wendat was at least just as much a "mourning war" as a "beaver war" as the Iroquois obsessively raided Wendake for ten years after their great raids of 1649 to take single Wendat back to Kanienkeh, even though they did not possess much in the way of beaver pelts. The Iroquois's population had been devastated by losses because of European diseases like smallpox for they had no immunity, and when the Iroquois finally made peace with the French in 1667, one of the terms was the French had to hand over all of the Wendat who had fled to New France.

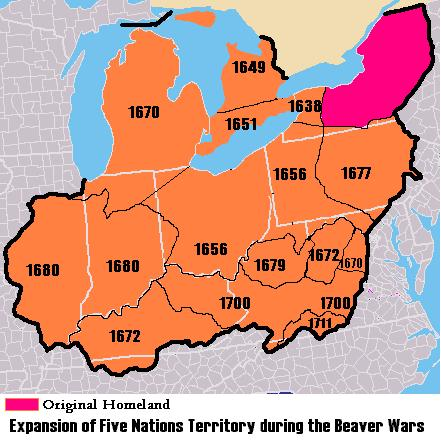
Iroquois conquests during the Beaver Wars (mid-1600s), which largely depopulated the upper and mid-Ohio River valley.

The Iroquois had already clashed with the French in 1609, 1610 and 1615, but the "beaver wars" caused a lengthy struggle with the French who had no intention of allowing the Five Nations to set themselves up as the only middlemen in the fur trade. The French did not fare well at first, with the Iroquois inflicting more casualties than they suffered, French settlements frequently cut off, canoes bringing fur to Montreal intercepted, and sometimes the Iroquois blockaded the Saint Lawrence.

=== New France ===
New France was a proprietary colony run by the Compagnie des Cent-Associés who went bankrupt in 1663 because of the Iroquois attacks which made the fur trade unprofitable for the French. After the Compagnie des Cent-Associés went bankrupt, New France was taken over by the French Crown. King Louis XIV wanted his new Crown colony to turn a profit and dispatched the Carignan-Salières Regiment to defend it.

In 1666, the Carignan-Salières Regiment made a devastating raid upon Kanienkeh, which led the Five Nations to sue for peace in 1667. The era from roughly 1660 through 1763 saw a fierce rivalry grow between France and Great Britain as each European power struggled to expand their fur-trading territories. The two imperial powers and their native allies competed in conflicts that culminated in the French and Indian War, a part of the Seven Years' War in Europe.

The 1659–1660 voyage of French traders Pierre-Esprit Radisson and Médard Chouart des Groseilliers into the country north and west of Lake Superior symbolically opened this new era of expansion. Their trading voyage proved extremely lucrative in furs. More importantly, they learned of a frozen sea to the north that provided easy access to the fur-bearing interior. Upon their return, French officials confiscated the furs of these unlicensed coureurs des bois. Radisson and Groseilliers went to Boston and then to London to secure funding and two ships to explore the Hudson Bay. Their success led to England's chartering of the Hudson's Bay Company in 1670, a major player in the fur trade for the next two centuries.

=== Westward expansion ===
French exploration and expansion westward continued with men such as La Salle and Jacques Marquette exploring and claiming the Great Lakes as well as the Ohio and Mississippi River valleys. To bolster these territorial claims, the French constructed a series of small fortifications, beginning with Fort Frontenac on Lake Ontario in 1673. Together with the construction of Le Griffon in 1679, the first full-sized sailing ship on the Great Lakes, the forts opened the upper Great Lakes to French navigation.

More native groups learned about European wares and became trading middlemen, most notably the Ottawa. The competitive impact of the new English Hudson's Bay Company trade was felt as early as 1671, with diminished returns for the French and the role of the native middlemen. This new competition directly stimulated French expansion into the North West to win back native customers.

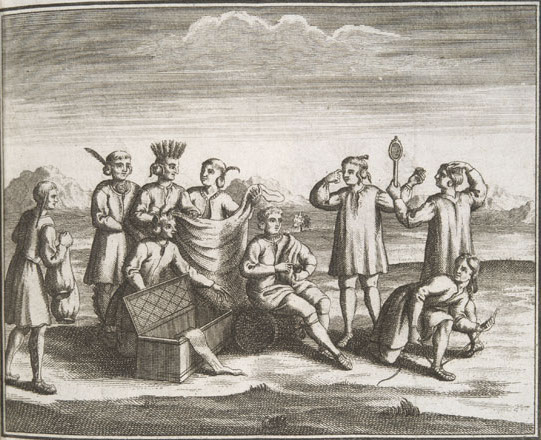
Iroquois, with western goods 1722

What followed was a continual expansion north and west of Lake Superior. The French used diplomatic negotiations with natives to win back trade and an aggressive military policy to temporarily eliminate the Hudson's Bay Company competition. At the same time, the English presence in New England grew stronger, while the French were occupied with trying to combat the coureurs de bois and allied Indians from smuggling furs to the English for often higher prices and higher quality goods than they could offer.

In 1675, the Iroquois made peace with the Machian while finally defeating the Susquenhannock. In the late 1670s and early 1680s, the Five Nations started to raid what is now the Midwest, battling the Miami and the Illinois while alternatively fighting against and attempting to make an alliance with the Ottawa. One Onondaga chief, Otreouti, whom the French called La Grande Gueule ("the big mouth"), announced in a speech in 1684 that the wars against the Illinois and Miami were justified because "They came to hunt beavers on our lands ...".

=== French and Indian War ===
Initially, the French took an ambivalent attitude towards the Iroquois push west. On one hand, having the Five Nations at war with other nations prevented those nations from trading with the English at Albany, while on the other hand, the French did not want the Iroquois to become the only middlemen in the fur trade. But as the Iroquois continued to win against the other nations, they prevented French and Algonquin fur traders from entering the Mississippi River valley, and the Ottawa showed signs of finally making an alliance with the Five Nations, in 1684, the French declared war on the Iroquois. Otreouti in an appeal for help correctly noted: "The French will have all the beavers and are angry with us for bringing you any".

Starting in 1684, the French repeatedly raided Kanienkeh, burning crops and villages as Louis gave orders to "humble" the Five Nations once and for all, and to teach them to respect the "grandeur" of France. The repeated French raids took their toll with the Mohawk who could field about 300 warriors in the 1670s to able to field only 170 warriors in the summer of 1691. The Iroquois struck back by making raids into New France with the most successful being a raid on Lachine in 1689 that killed 24 Frenchmen while taking 80 captives, but the superior resources of the French state proceeded to grind them down until they finally made peace in 1701.

The settlement of native refugees from the Beaver Wars in the western and northern Great Lakes combined with the decline of the Ottawa middlemen to create vast new markets for French traders. Resurgent Iroquoian warfare in the 1680s also stimulated the fur trade as native French allies bought weapons. The new more distant markets and fierce English competition stifled direct trade from the North West with Montreal. The old system of native middlemen and coureurs de bois traveling to trade fairs in Montreal or illegally to English markets was replaced by an increasingly complex and labor-intensive trade network.

Licensed voyageurs, allied with Montreal merchants, used water routes to reach the far-flung corners of the North West with canoe loads of trade goods. These risky ventures required large initial investments and had a very slow return. The first revenues from fur sales in Europe did not arrive until four or more years after the initial investment. These economic factors concentrated the fur trade in the hands of a few large Montreal merchants who had available capital. This trend expanded in the 18th century and reached its zenith with the great fur-trading companies of the 19th century.

== English colonies ==
By the end of the 18th century the four major British fur trading outposts were Fort Niagara in modern New York, Fort Detroit and Fort Michilimackinac in modern Michigan, and Grand Portage in modern Minnesota, all in the Great Lakes region. The American Revolution and the resulting resolution of national borders forced the British to re-locate their trading centers northward. The newly formed United States began its own attempts to capitalize on the fur trade, initially with some success. By the 1830s the fur trade had begun a steep decline, and fur was never again the lucrative enterprise it had once been.

== Indigenous peoples and the fur trade ==
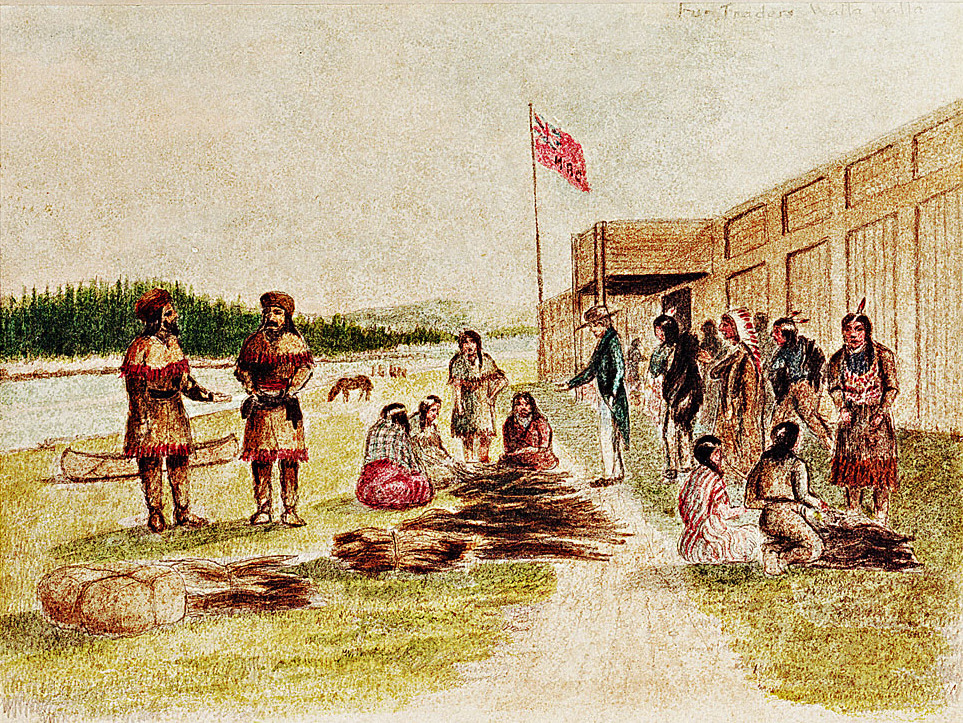
Fur trading at Fort Nez Percés in 1841

=== Lifestyle changes ===
Indigenous North American beliefs in the affected region incorporate respect for the environment. Traditionally, many tribes in the region believe in a spiritual relationship between the people and the animals they rely on for food, clothing, and medicines, and many tribes have traditional protocols surrounding how a hunt should occur, particularly prohibitions against needless killing of deer. There are specific taboos against taking the skins of unhealthy deer. But the arrival of the lucrative European deerskin trade prompted some hunters to abandon tradition and act past the point of restraint they had operated under before. The hunting economy collapsed because of the scarcity of deer as they were over-hunted and lost their lands to white settlers. As the deer populations declined and the government pressured tribes to switch to the European settler's way of life, animal husbandry replaced deer hunting both as an income and in the diet.

Rum was first introduced in the early 16th century as a trading item and quickly became an inelastic good. While Native Americans for the most part acted conservatively in trading deals, they consumed a surplus of alcohol. Traders used rum to help form partnerships. Rum had a significant effect on the social behavior of Native Americans. Under the influence of rum, the younger generation did not obey the elders of the tribe and became involved with more skirmishes with other tribes and white settlers. Rum also disrupted the amount of time the younger generation of males spent on labor. Alcohol was one of the goods provided on credit, and led to a debt trap for many Native Americans. Native Americans did not know how to distill alcohol and thus were driven to trade for it.

Native Americans had become dependent on manufactured goods such as guns and domesticated animals, and lost much of their traditional practices. With the new cattle herds roaming the hunting lands, and a greater emphasis on farming due to the invention of the cotton gin, Native Americans struggled to maintain their place in the economy. An inequality gap had appeared in the tribes, as some hunters were more successful than others.

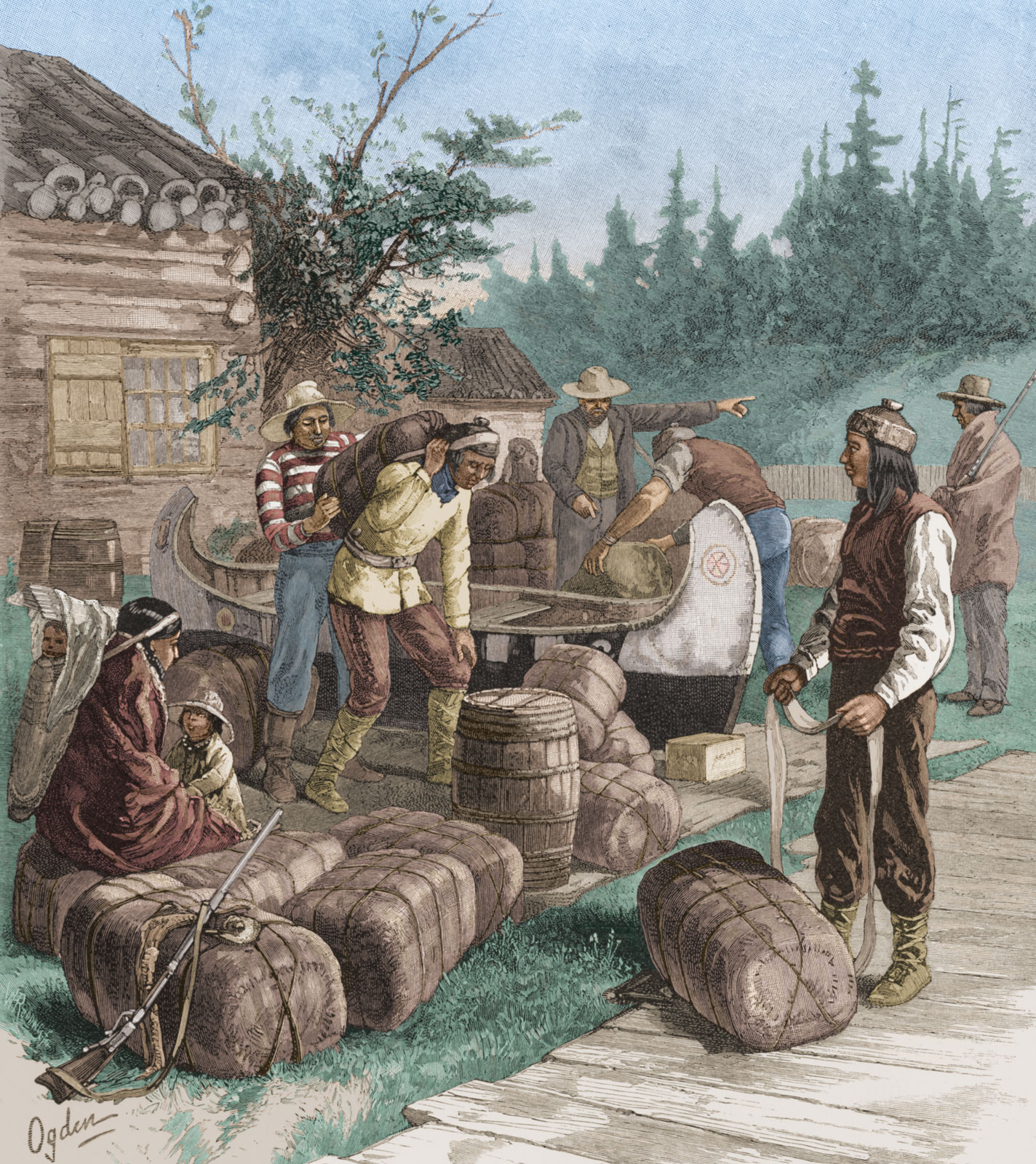
Trading at an HBC trading post

Still, the creditors treated an individual's debt as debt of the whole tribe and used several strategies to keep the Native Americans in debt. Traders would rig the weighing system that determined the value of the deerskins in their favor, cut measurement tools to devalue the deerskin, and would tamper with the manufactured goods to decrease their worth, such as watering down the alcohol they traded. To satisfy the need for deerskins, many males of the tribes abandoned their traditional seasonal roles and became full-time traders. When the deerskin trade collapsed, Native Americans found themselves dependent on manufactured goods, and could not return to the old ways because of lost knowledge.

=== Indigenous women as traders ===
Indigenous women contributed to the success of the fur trade. Many Indigenous women of varying tribes were responsible for trapping smaller fur-bearing animals such as marten. European household goods became a commodity in many Indigenous communities in western Canada, which promted many Indigenous women to strive for trading. The foundation of the fur trade society is founded upon the unions of Indigenous women and European men. These unions were a rite known as marriage a la facon du pays.

==== Fur preparation ====
Hide tanning

Pelts were most often prepared by women, with beaver being the most popular commodity. When the men would return with hunted beaver, the women would begin preparing the pelts by skinning the animal and then washing the blood and dirt from the hide. The pelts were then scrapped with tools to remove any excess meat, fat, and bone, then stretched on a stretcher to dry. The dried pelts were called castor sec (dried beaver), and were very stiff. Extra steps were involved in order to transform these dried pelts into blankets or other garments. These pelts would then be sent to posts for trade.

==== Garment making ====
Moccasin (1898)

Indigenous women performed the task of shoemaking, which provided trading posts a steady supply of shoes (moccasins) which were sought after and considred the most practical foorwear at the time. Indigenous women were also responsible for crafting snowshoes, which were incredibly important during the winter months. Without snowshoes, travel in the winter months became difficult and near imposible, as they allowed traders to walk atop the snow. However, men often made the wooden frames of the snowshes, while women assembled them using sinew.

=== Provisions ===
Indigenous woman making pemmican

Provisions were equally as important as proper footwear, with Indigenous women making vital contributions in food preservation. Pemmican was a nutritional staple throughout the fur trade, as it was high in protein and calories, and could be easily transported. Western Indigenous women were tasked with skinning and cutting the meat off the game the men had hunted. The meat was cut into thin strips, dried, and pounded with fat. Northern Indigenous communities relied more on fish rather than pemmican. The Indigenous women would split and dry fish the men had caught, which provided food for the harsh winter months, ensuring survival. Indigenous women normally harvested the rice and made the maple sugar that were important aspects of the traders' diets, for which they were usually paid with alcohol. Henry mentions how at one Ojibwe village, the men only wanted alcohol in exchange for furs while the women demanded a wide variety of European goods in exchange for rice.

==== Canoe making ====
Birch canoe

With the adoption of the birchbark canoe, indigenous women contributed to its craftsmanship. Women were tasked with the collection of spruce roots and gum which were used as the canoes threading and waterproofing. Not only did Indigenous women aid in the making of the canoes, their expertise atop the water was much needed as well. Many Indigenous women were called upon by the Hudson's Bay Company for labour as they had more experience paddling and steering canoes. The manufacturing canoes was work done by both Indigenous men and women, and accounts of fur traders often mentioned bartering goods with women in exchange for canoes. One French-Canadian voyageur named Michel Curot lists in his journal how in the course of one expedition, he traded goods for furs with Ojibwe men 19 times, with Ojibwe women 22 times, and another 23 times in which he did not list the gender of the people he was trading with. As women held a very low status in French Canada, White argues it is likely that the majority of the anonymous Indigenous people that Curot traded with were women whose names were not considered important enough to write down.

One example of a prominent Indigenous woman trader was the Anishinaabekwe Elizabeth Bertrand Mitchell (Omagigiwikway). Along with her husband David Mitchell, Elizabeth was one of the most successful traders around the Straits of Mackinac in the late 18th and early 19th centuries.

=== Marriage as a trading strategy ===
Many Indigenous bands encouraged the union of their women and European traders, as it created, fortified, and maintained important alliances with European traders. By allowing the European men the privilege of access to their women, they expected in return access to posts and provisions. European men were drawn to interracial marriage due to an absence of white women. However, European men were expected to ask permission before engaging in a marital union with an Indigenous woman, and she could deny any advances if they did not suit her interest. Depending on the tribe, the marriage between an Indigenous women could secure copious amounts of provisions from the European side as a gesture of thanks. These marriages also led to the ethnogenesis of the Metis People.

Ojibwe Women

The Indigenous peoples were organized into kinship and clan networks, and marrying a woman from one of these kinship networks would make a fur trader into a member of these networks, thereby ensuring that women belonging to whatever clan the trader had married into were more likely to deal only with him. Furthermore, the fur traders discovered that the Indigenous people were more likely to share food, especially during the hard months of winter, to those fur traders who were regarded as part of their communities.

American historian Bruce White describes the way in which the Ojibwe and the other Indigenous peoples sought to "use sexual relations as a means of establishing long-term relationships between themselves and people from another society was a rational strategy, one that has been described in many parts of the world". One fur trader who married an Ojibwe woman describes how the Ojibwe would initially shun a fur trader until they could give gauge his honesty and provided he proved himself an honest man, "the chiefs would take together their marriageable girls to his trading house and he was given the choice of the lot". If the fur trader married, the Ojibwe would trade with him as he became part of the community, and if he refused to marry, then the Ojibwe would not trade with him as Ojibwe only traded with a man who "took one of their women for his wife".

The fur trade did not involve barter in the way that most people presuppose but was a credit/debit relationship when a fur trader would arrive in a community in the summer or fall, hand out goods to the Native Americans who would pay him back in the spring with the furs from the animals they had killed over the winter; in the interim, further exchanges often involved both Indigenous men and women.

French fur trader Claude-Charles Le Roy wrote that the Dakota had decided to make peace with their traditional enemies, the Ojibwe, in order to obtain French goods that the Ojibwe were blocking them from receiving. Le Roy writes the Dakota "could obtain French merchandise only through the agency of the Sauteurs [Ojibwe]" so they made "a treaty of peace by which they were mutually bound to give their daughters in marriage on both sides". These marriages usually involved a simple ceremony involving the exchange of valuable gifts from the parents of the bride and groom and, unlike European marriages, could be dissolved at any time by one partner choosing to walk out.

Fur traders found that marrying the daughters of chiefs would ensure the co-operation of an entire community. Marriage alliances were also made between Indian tribes. In September 1679, the French diplomat and soldier Daniel Greysolon, Sieur du Lhut, called a peace conference at Fond du Lac (modern Duluth, Minnesota) of all the "nations of the north" which was attended by Ojibwe, Dakota, and Assiniboine leaders, where it was agreed that the daughters and sons of the various chiefs would marry each other to promote peace and ensure the flow of French goods into the region.

In the early 18th century, the fathers of Indigenous women promoted marriage between their daughters and European settlers as it would help establish a place within the trade society. However, in 1806, marriage between European men and full-blooded Indigenous women was prohibited, allowing only for the union of mixed Indigenous women and settler men. This sparked a culture shift within the interracial unions from Indigenous ceremonies to a more Christian focused union. These marriages were beginning to be viewed as permanent unions, and mixed Indigenous women began adopting the Christian settler beliefs.

==== Spiritual roles of women ====
For the Indians, dreams were viewed as messages from the world of the spirits, which was seen as a vastly more powerful and important world than the one inhabited by them. Gender roles were not fixed in Indian communities, and it was possible for a woman who had dreams of herself performing a masculine role being able to persuade her community on the basis of her dreams to be allowed to take part in work that was normally performed by men, since this was evidently what the spirits wanted. Ojibwe women in their teenage years embarked upon "vision quests" to find out what fate the spirits wanted for them.

The Indians who lived around the Great Lakes believed that when a girl started to menstruate (regarded as giving women a special spiritual power) that whatever her dreams she might have were messages from the spirits, and many fur traders mentioned how women who were regarded as being especially favored with their dream-messages from the world of the spirits played important roles as decision-makers within their communities. Sometimes, Ojibwe girls would consume hallucinogenic mushrooms during their ceremonies to receive further messages from the world of the spirits. Having established a relationship with a particular spirit at puberty, women would go on further vision quests throughout their lives with more ceremonies and dreams to continue the relationship. Netnokwa, a charismatic Ojibwe matron living in the Red River region whose dreams were considered to be especially powerful messages from the spirits, traded directly with fur traders. John Tanner, her adopted son, notes that she received "ten gallons of spirits" every year from the fur traders as it considered to be wise to stay in her good graces, and whenever she visited Fort Mackinac "she was saluted by a gun from the fort". As menstrual blood was seen as sign of women's spiritual power, it was understood that men must never touch it.

In 1793 Oshahgushkodanaqua, an Ojibwe woman from the far western end of Lake Superior, married John Johnston, a British fur trader based in Sault Ste. Marie working for the North West Company. Later in her old age, she gave an account to British writer Anna Brownell Jameson of how she came to be married. According to Jameson's 1838 book Winter Studies and Summer Rambles in Canada, Oshahgushkodanaqua told her when she was 13, she embarked on her "vision quest" to find her guardian spirit by fasting alone in a lodge painted black on a high hill. During Oshahgushkodanaqua's "vision quest":

"She dreamed continually of a white man, who approached her with a cup in his hand, saying "Poor thing! Why are you punishing yourself? Why do you fast? Here is food for you!" He was always accompanied by a dog, who looked up at her like he knew her. Also, she dreamed of being on a high hill, which was surrounded by water, and from which she beheld many canoes full of Indians, coming to her and paying her homage; after this, she felt as if she was being carried up into the heavens, and as she looked down on the earth, she perceived it was on fire and said to herself, "All my relations will be burned!", but a voice answered and said, "No, they will not be destroyed, they will be saved!", and she knew it was a spirit, because the voice was not human. She fasted for ten days, during which time her grandmother brought her at intervals some water. When satisfied that she had obtained a guardian spirit in the white stranger who haunted her dreams, she returned to her father's lodge".

About five years later, Oshahgushkodanaqua first met Johnston, who asked to marry her but was refused permission by her father who did not think he wanted a long-term relationship. When Johnston returned the next year and again asked to marry Oshahgushkodanaqua, her father granted permission, but she declined, saying she disliked the implications of being married until death, but ultimately married under strong pressure from her father. Oshahgushkodanaqua came to embrace her marriage when she decided that Johnston was the white stranger she saw in her dreams during her vision quest. The couple stayed married for 36 years with the marriage ending with Johnston's death, and Oshahgushkodanaqua played an important role in her husband's business career. Jameson also notes that Oshahgushkodanaqua was considered to be a strong woman among the Ojibwe, writing "in her youth she hunted and was accounted the surest eye and fleetest foot among the women of her tribe".

==== Northern Athabaskan peoples ====
Geographic distribution of the Athabaskan languages

The fur trade seems to have weakened the status of Indian women in the Canadian sub-arctic in what is now the Northwest Territories, the Yukon, and the northern parts of Manitoba, Saskatchewan and Alberta. The harsh terrain imposed a nomadic or semi-nomadic lifestyle on the people living there as to stay in one place for long would quickly exhaust the food supply. The Indians living in the sub-arctic had only small dogs incapable of carrying heavy loads with one fur trader in 1867 calling Gwich'in dogs "miserable creatures no smaller than foxes" while another noted "dogs were scare and burdens were supported by people's backs". The absence of navigable rivers made riparian transport impossible, so everything had to be carried on the backs of the women.

There was a belief among the Northern Athabaskan peoples that weapons could be only handled by men, and that for a weapon to be used by a woman would cause it to lose its effectiveness; as relations between the bands were hostile, during travel, men were always armed while the women carried all of the baggage. All of the Indian men living in the sub-arctic had an acute horror of menstrual blood, seen as an unclean substance that no men could ever touch and as a symbol of a threatening femininity.

American anthropologist Richard J. Perry suggests that under the impact of the fur trade that certain misogynistic tendencies that were already long established among the Northern Athabaskan peoples became significantly worse. Owing to the harsh terrain of the subarctic and the limited food supplies, the First Nations peoples living there had long practiced infanticide to limit their band sizes, as a large population would starve. One fur trader in the 19th century noted that within the Gwich'in, newly born girls were far more likely to be victims of infanticide than boys, owing to the low status of women, adding that female infanticide was practiced to such an extent there was a shortage of women in their society.

Perry argues that the crucial difference between the Northern Athabaskan peoples living in the sub-arctic compared to those living further south like the Cree and Ojibwe was the existence of waterways that canoes could traverse. In the 18th century, Cree and Ojibwe men could and did travel hundreds of miles to HBC posts on Hudson's Bay via canoe to sell fur and bring back European goods, and in the interim, their women were in largely in charge of their communities. At York Factory in the 18th century, the factors reported that flotillas of up to 200 canoes would arrive at a time bearing Indian men coming to barter their fur for HBC's goods. Normally, the trip to York Factory was made by the Cree and Ojibwe men while their womenfolk stayed behind in their villages. Until 1774, the Hudson's Bay Company was content to operate its posts on the shores of Hudson's Bay, and only competition from the rival North West Company based in Montreal forced the Hudson's Bay Company to assert its claim to Rupert's Land. By contrast, the absence of waterways flowing into Hudson's Bay (the major river in the subarctic, the Mackenzie, flows into the Arctic Ocean) forced the Northern Athabaskan peoples to travel by foot with the women as baggage carriers. In this way, the fur trade empowered Cree and Ojibwe women while reducing the Northern Athabaskan women down to a slave-like existence.

=== Chipewyan ===
The Chipewyan began trading fur in exchange for metal tools and instruments with the Hudson's Bay Company in 1717, which caused a drastic change in their lifestyle, going from a people engage in daily subsistence activities to a people engaging in far-reaching trade as the Chipewyan become the middlemen between the Hudson's Bay Company and the other Indians living further inland. The Chipewyan guarded their right to trade with the Hudson's Bay Company with considerable jealousy and prevented peoples living further inland like the Tłı̨chǫ and Yellowknives from crossing their territory to trade directly with the Hudson's Bay Company for the entire 18th century.

For the Chipewyan, who were still living in the Stone Age, metal implements were greatly valued as it took hours to heat up a stone pot but only minutes to heat up a metal pot, while an animal could be skinned far more efficiently and quickly with a metal knife than with a stone knife. For many Chipewyan bands, involvement with the fur trade eroded their self-sufficiency as they killed animals for the fur trade, not food, which forced them into dependency on other bands for food, thus leading to a cycle where many Chipewyan bands came to depend trading furs for European goods, which were traded for food and which caused them to make very long trips across the subarctic to Hudson's Bay and back. To make these trips, the Chipewyan traveled though barren terrain that was so devoid of life that starvation was a real threat, during which the women had to carry all of the supplies. Samuel Hearne of the Hudson's Bay Company who was sent inland in 1768 to establish contact with the "Far Indians" as the company called them, writes about the Chipewyan:

"Their annual haunts, in the quest for furrs [furs], is so remote from European settlement, as to render them the greatest travelers in the known world; and as they have neither horse nor water carriage, every good hunter is under necessity of having several people to assist in carrying his furs to the company's Fort, as well as carrying back the European goods which he received in exchange for them. No persons in this country are so proper for this work as the women, because they are inured to carry and haul heavy loads from their childhood and to do all manner of drudgery".

Hearne's chief guide Matonabbee told him that women had to carry everything with them on their long trips across the sub-arctic because "...when all the men are heavy laden, they can neither hunt nor travel any considerable distance". Perry cautioned that when Hearne traveled though the sub-arctic in 1768–1772, the Chipewyan had been trading with the Hudson's Bay Company directly since 1717 and indirectly via the Cree for at least the last 90 years, so the lifestyles he observed among the Chipewyan had been altered by the fur trade and cannot be considered a pre-contact life style. But Perry argued that the arduous nature of these trips across the sub-arctic together with the burden of carrying everything suggests that the Chipewyan women did not voluntarily submit to this regime, which would suggest that even in the pre-contact period that Chipewyan women had a low status.

=== Gwich'in ===
When fur traders first contacted the Gwich'in in 1810 when they founded Fort Good Hope on the Mackenzie River, accounts describe a more or less egalitarian society, but the impact of the fur trade lowered the status of Gwich'in women. Accounts by the fur traders in the 1860s describe Gwich'in women as essentially slaves, carrying the baggage on their long journeys across the sub-arctic. One fur trader wrote about the Gwich'in women that they were "little better than slaves" while another fur trader wrote about the "brutal treatment" that Gwich'in women suffered at the hands of their men. Gwich'in band leaders who became rich by First Nations standards by engaging in the fur trade tended to have several wives, and indeed tended to monopolize the women in their bands. This caused serious social tensions, as Gwich'in young men found it impossible to have a mate, as their leaders took all of the women for themselves.

Significantly, the establishment of fur trading posts inland by the Hudson's Bay Company in the late 19th century led to an improvement in the status of Gwich'in women as anyone could obtain European goods by trading at the local HBC post, ending the ability of Gwich'in leaders to monopolize the distribution of European goods while the introduction of dogs capable of carrying sleds meant their women no longer had to carry everything on their long trips.

=== Ojibwe ===
The Ojibwe believed if the plants and animals were not thanked for "giving" themselves to them, then the plants and animals would be less "giving" the next year, and the same principle applied to their relations with other peoples such as the fur traders. The Ojibwe, like other First Nations, believed that animals willingly allowed themselves to be killed and that if a hunter failed to give thanks to the animal world, then the animals would be less "giving" the next time around. As the fur traders were predominately male and heterosexual while there were few white women beyond the frontier, the Indians were well aware of the sexual attraction felt by the fur traders towards their women, who were seen as having a special power over white men.

From the Ojibwe viewpoint, if one of their women gave herself to a fur trader, it created the reciprocal obligation for the fur trader to give back. Fur-trading companies encouraged their employees to take Indian wives, not only to build long-term relationships that were good for business, but also because an employee with a wife would have to buy more supplies from his employer, with the money for the purchases usually subtracted from his wages. White decries the tendency of many historians to see these women as simply "passive" objects that were bartered for by fur traders and Indian tribal elders, writing that these women had to "exert influence and be active communicators of information" to be effective as the wife of a fur trader, and that many of the women who married fur traders "embraced" these marriages to achieve "useful purposes for themselves and for the communities that they lived in".

White argues that the traditional "imperial adventure" historiography where the fur trade was the work of a few courageous white men who ventured into the wildness was flawed as it ignored the contributions of the Indians. The American anthropologist Ruth Landes in her 1937 book Ojibwe Women describes Ojibwe society in the 1930s as based on "male supremacy", and she assumes this was how Ojibwe society had always been, a conclusion that has been widely followed. Landes notes that the women she interviewed told her stories about Ojibwe women who in centuries past inspired by their dream visions had played prominent roles as warriors, hunters, healers, traders and leaders. In 1978, the American anthropologist Eleanor Leacock who, writing from a Marxist perspective in her article "Women's Status In Egalitarian Society," challenges Landes by arguing that Ojibwe society had in fact been egalitarian, but the fur trade had changed the dynamics of Ojibwe society from a simple barter economy to one where men could become powerful by having access to European goods, and this had led to the marginalization of Ojibwe women.

More recently, American anthropologist Carol Devens in her 1992 book Countering Colonization: Native American Women and the Great Lakes Missions 1630–1900 follows Leacock by arguing that exposure to the patriarchal values of ancien regime France together with the ability to collect "surplus goods" made possible by the fur trade had turned the egalitarian Ojibwe society into unequal society where women did not count for much. White writes that an examination of the contemporary sources would suggest the fur trade had in fact empowered and strengthened the role of Ojibwe women who played a very important role in the fur trade, and it was the decline of the fur trade which had led to the decline of status of Ojibwe women.

=== Métis people ===
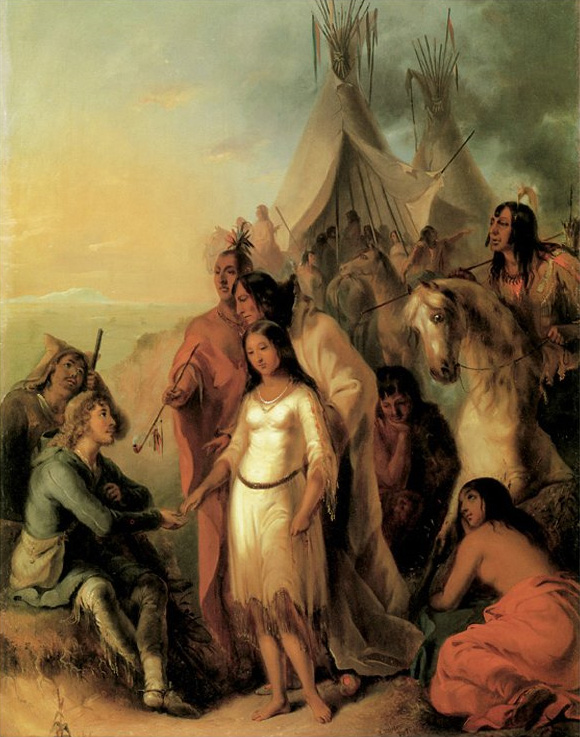
The Trapper's Bride by Alfred Jacob Miller, 1837

As men from the old fur trade in the northeast made the trek west in the early 19th century, they sought to recreate the economic system from which they had profited in the northeast. Some men went alone, but others relied on companies like the Hudson's Bay Company and the Missouri Fur Company. Marriage and kinship with native women played an important role in the western fur trade. White traders who moved west needed to establish themselves in the kinship networks of the tribes, and they often did this by marrying a prominent Indian woman. This practice was called a "country" marriage and allowed the trader to network with the adult male members of the woman's band, who were necessary allies for trade. The children of these unions, who were known as Métis, were an integral part of the fur trade system.

The Métis label defined these children as a marginal people with a fluid identity. Early on in the fur trade, Métis were not defined by their racial category but rather by the way of life they chose. These children were generally the offspring of white men and native mothers and were often raised to follow the mother's lifestyle. The father could influence the acculturation process and prevent the child from being classified as Métis in the early years of the western fur trade. Fur families often included displaced native women who lived near forts and formed networks among themselves. These networks helped to create kinship between tribes which benefitted the traders. Catholics tried their best to validate these unions through marriages. But missionaries and priests often had trouble categorizing the women, especially when establishing tribal identity.

Métis were among the first groups of fur traders who came from the northeast. These men were mostly of a mixed race identity, largely Iroquois, as well as other tribes from the Ohio Country. Rather than one tribal identity, many of these Métis had multiple Indian heritages. Lewis and Clark, who opened up the market on the fur trade in the Upper Missouri River, brought with them many Métis to serve as engagés. These same Métis would become involved in the early western fur trade. Many of them settled on the Missouri River and married into the tribes there before setting up their trade networks. The first generation of Métis born in the West grew up out of the old fur trade and provided a bridge to the new western empire. These Métis possessed both native and European skills, spoke multiple languages, and had the important kinship networks required for trade. In addition, many spoke the Michif Métis dialect. In an effort to distinguish themselves from natives, many Métis strongly associated with Roman Catholic beliefs and avoided participating in native ceremonies.

By the 1820s, the fur trade had expanded into the Rocky Mountains where American and British interests begin to compete for control of the lucrative trade. The Métis would play a key role in this competition. The early Métis congregated around trading posts where they were employed as packers, laborers, or boatmen. Through their efforts they helped to create a new order centered on the trading posts. Other Métis traveled with the trapping brigades in a loose business arrangement where authority was taken lightly and independence was encouraged. By the 1830s, Canadians and Americans were venturing into the West to secure a new fur supply. Companies like the NWC and the HBC provided employment opportunities for Métis. By the end of the 19th century, many companies considered the Métis to be Indian in their identity. As a result, many Métis left the companies in order to pursue freelance work.

After 1815, the demand for bison robes began to rise gradually, although the beaver still remained the primary trade item. The 1840s saw a rise in the bison trade as the beaver trade begin to decline. Many Métis adapted to this new economic opportunity. This change of trade item made it harder for Métis to operate within companies like the HBC, but this made them welcome allies of the Americans who wanted to push the British to the Canada–U.S. border. Although the Métis would initially operate on both sides of the border, by the 1850s they were forced to pick an identity and settle either north or south of the border. The period of the 1850s was thus one of migration for the Métis, many of whom drifted and established new communities or settled within existing Canadian, American or Indian communities.

A group of Métis who identified with the Chippewa moved to the Pembina in 1819 and then to the Red River area in 1820, which was located near St. François Xavier in Manitoba. In this region they would establish several prominent fur trading communities. These communities had ties to one another through the NWC. This relationship dated back to between 1804 and 1821 when Métis men had served as low level voyageurs, guides, interpreters, and contre-maitres, or foremen. It was from these communities that Métis buffalo hunters operating in the robe trade arose.

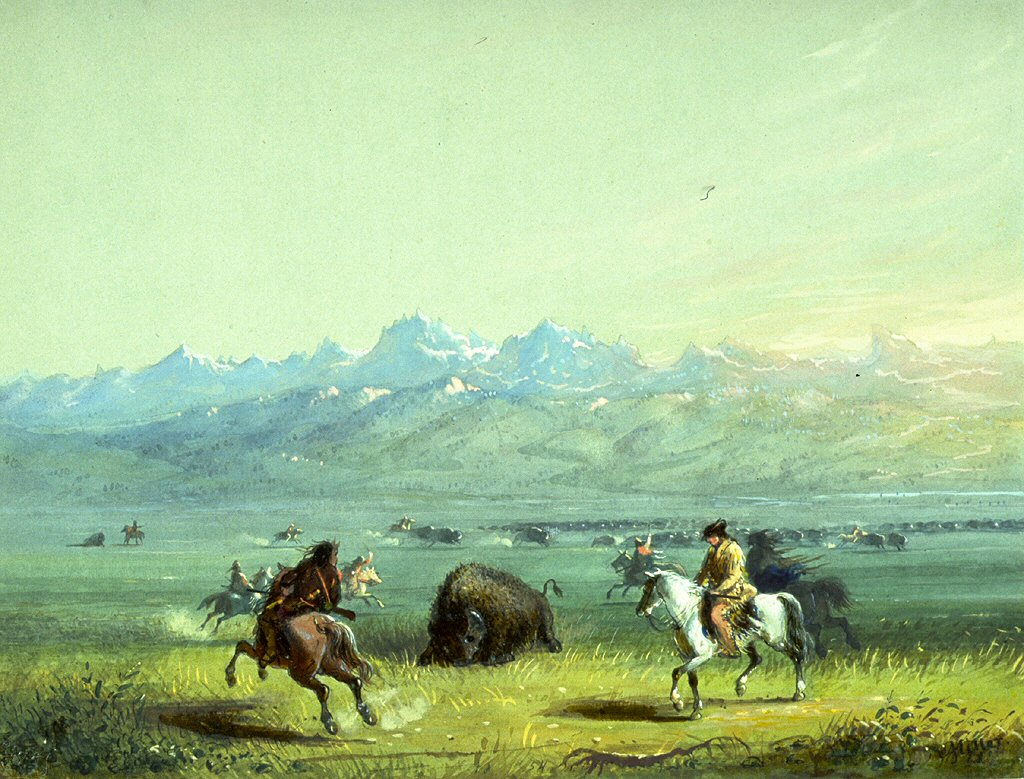
Bison hunting, by Alfred Jacob Miller

The Métis established a whole economic system around the bison trade. Whole Métis families were involved in the production of robes, which was the driving force of the winter hunt. In addition, they sold pemmican at the posts. Unlike Indians, the Métis were dependent on the fur trade system and subject to the market. The international prices of bison robes were directly influential on the well-being of Métis communities. By contrast, the local Indians had a more diverse resource base and were less dependent on Americans and Europeans at this time.

By the 1850s, the fur trade had expanded across the Great Plains, and the bison robe trade began to decline. The Métis had a role in the depopulation of the bison. Like the Indians, the Métis had a preference for cows, which meant that the bison had trouble maintaining their herds. In addition, flood, drought, early frost, and the environmental impact of settlement posed further threats to the herds. Traders, trappers, and hunters all depended on the bison to sustain their way of life. The Métis tried to maintain their lifestyle through a variety of means. For instance, they often used two wheel carts made from local materials, which meant that they were more mobile than Indians and thus were not dependent on following seasonal hunting patterns.

The 1870s brought an end to the bison presence in the Red River area. Métis communities like those at Red River or Turtle Mountain were forced to relocate to Canada and Montana. An area of resettlement was the Judith Basin in Montana, which still had a population of bison surviving in the early 1880s. By the end of decade the bison were gone, and Métis hunters relocated back to tribal lands. They wanted to take part in treaty negotiations in the 1880s, but they had questionable status with tribes such as the Chippewa.

Many former Métis bison hunters tried to get land claims during the treaty negotiations in 1879–1880. They were reduced to squatting on Indian land during this time and collecting bison bones for $15–20 per ton in order to purchase supplies for the winter. The reservation system did not ensure that the Métis were protected and accepted as Indians. To further complicate matters, Métis had a questionable status as citizens and were often deemed incompetent to give court testimonies and denied the right to vote. The end of the bison robe trade was the end of the fur trade for many Métis. This meant that they had to reestablish their identity and adapt to a new economic world.

== Pacific coast ==
On the Pacific coast, the fur trade mainly pursued seal and sea otter. In northern areas, this trade was established first by the Russian-American Company, with later participation by Spanish/Mexican, British, and U.S. hunters/traders. Non-Russians extended fur-hunting areas south as far as the Baja California Peninsula.

== Southeastern United States ==
=== Background ===
Starting in the mid-16th century, Europeans traded weapons and household goods in exchange for furs with Native Americans in southeast America. The trade originally tried to mimic the fur trade in the north, with large quantities of wildcats, bears, beavers, and other fur bearing animals being traded. The trade in fur coat animals decreased in the early 18th century, curtailed by the rising popularity of trade in deer skins. The deer skin trade went onto dominate the relationships between the Native Americans of the southeast and the European settlers there. Deer skin was a highly valued commodity because of the deer shortage in Europe, and the British leather industry needed deer skins to produce goods. The bulk of deer skins were exported to Great Britain during the peak of the deer skin trade.

=== Post-European contact in the 16th and 17th centuries ===
Spanish exploratory parties in the 16th century had violent encounters with the powerful chiefdoms, which led to the decentralization of the Indigenous people in the southeast. Almost a century passed between the original Spanish exploration and the next wave of European immigration, which allowed the survivors of the European diseases to organize into new tribes.

Most Spanish trade was limited with Indians on the coast until expeditions inland in the beginning of the 17th century. By 1639, substantial trade between the Spanish in Florida and the Native Americans for deer skins developed, with more interior tribes incorporated into the system by 1647. Many tribes throughout the southeast began to send trading parties to meet with the Spanish in Florida, or used other tribes as middlemen to obtain manufactured goods. The people of Apalachicola Province provided deer skins, and in return the Apalachees would give them silver, guns, or horses.

As Europeans settlers gradually colonized the southeast, the deerskin trade experienced a boom which persisted into the 18th century. Many of the white settlers who had settled in the Carolinas in the late 17th century came from Virginia, where trading patterns of European goods in exchange for beaver furs already had started. The white-tailed deer herds that roamed south of Virginia were a more profitable resource. The French and the English struggled for control over southern Appalachia and the Mississippi Valley, and needed alliances with the Indians there to maintain dominance. European settlers used the trade of deer skins for manufactured goods to secure trade relationships, and therefore power.

=== Yamasee War ===
The Yamasee are Indigenous peoples of the Southeastern Woodlands who have historically lived in the region of present-day South Carolina. At the beginning of the 18th century, tensions between the Yamasee and white settlers in colonial South Carolina, many of whom were fur traders, broke out into open conflict in 1715. The conflict almost destroyed the European colonial presence in the American Southeast, killing 7% of the settler population in South Carolina.

The Yamasee had incurred extensive debt in the first decade of the 18th century due to a habit of purchasing manufactured goods on credit from European traders, with many Yamasee being unable to produce enough deer skins to pay the debt later in the year. Indigenous peoples who were not able to pay their debt were often enslaved by settlers as a consequence. The practice of enslavement extended to the wives and children of the Yamasees in debt as well. This process frustrated the Yamasees and other tribes, who lodged complaints against the deceitful credit-loaning scheme European traders had established, to no avail. European settlers also promoted competition between tribes and sold firearms to both the Creek and Cherokee. This competition sprang out of the demand for slaves in the southeast – tribes would raid each other and sell captured prisoners of war as slaves to European settlers.

Beginning on April 14, 1715, the Yamasee launched numerous raids against white settlements in South Carolina, killing traders and driving settlers back from the frontier to Charles Town. In the conflict, the Yamasee were able to enlist the help of the Catawba, Creek, Cherokee, Waxhaw, and Santee, establishing a pan-tribal alliance. Eventually, however, the South Carolinian settlers were able to defeat the Yamasee due to the Catawba and Cherokee switching sides, cementing pre-existing trade partnerships.

The French had attempted to put an end to slave raids in regions under their control because their Indigenous allies, the Choctaw, Chickasaw, and Yazoos, bore the brunt of such raids. Firearms were essential trading items for the Native Americans to protect themselves from slave raids; motivation which drove the intensity of the deerskin trade. The demand for Indigenous slaves decreased as enslaved Africans began to be imported in larger quantities, and the trade's focus returned to deerskins. Another factor which lead to the decline in demand for Indigenous slaves was the Yamasee War, as white settlers became convinced of the need to avoid similar conflicts.

After the conflict ended, the Indigenous peoples inhabiting the region returned to making alliances with the European powers, using political savvy to get the best deals by playing the nations off each other. The Creeks were particularly good at manipulation – they had begun trading with South Carolina in the last years of the 17th century and became a trusted deerskin provider. The Creek were already a prosperous tribe due to their control over the most valuable hunting lands, especially when compared to the impoverished Cherokee. Due to allying with the British during the Yamasee War, the Cherokee lacked Indigenous trading partners and could not afford to break with Britain in order to negotiate with France or Spain.

=== Mississippi River valley ===
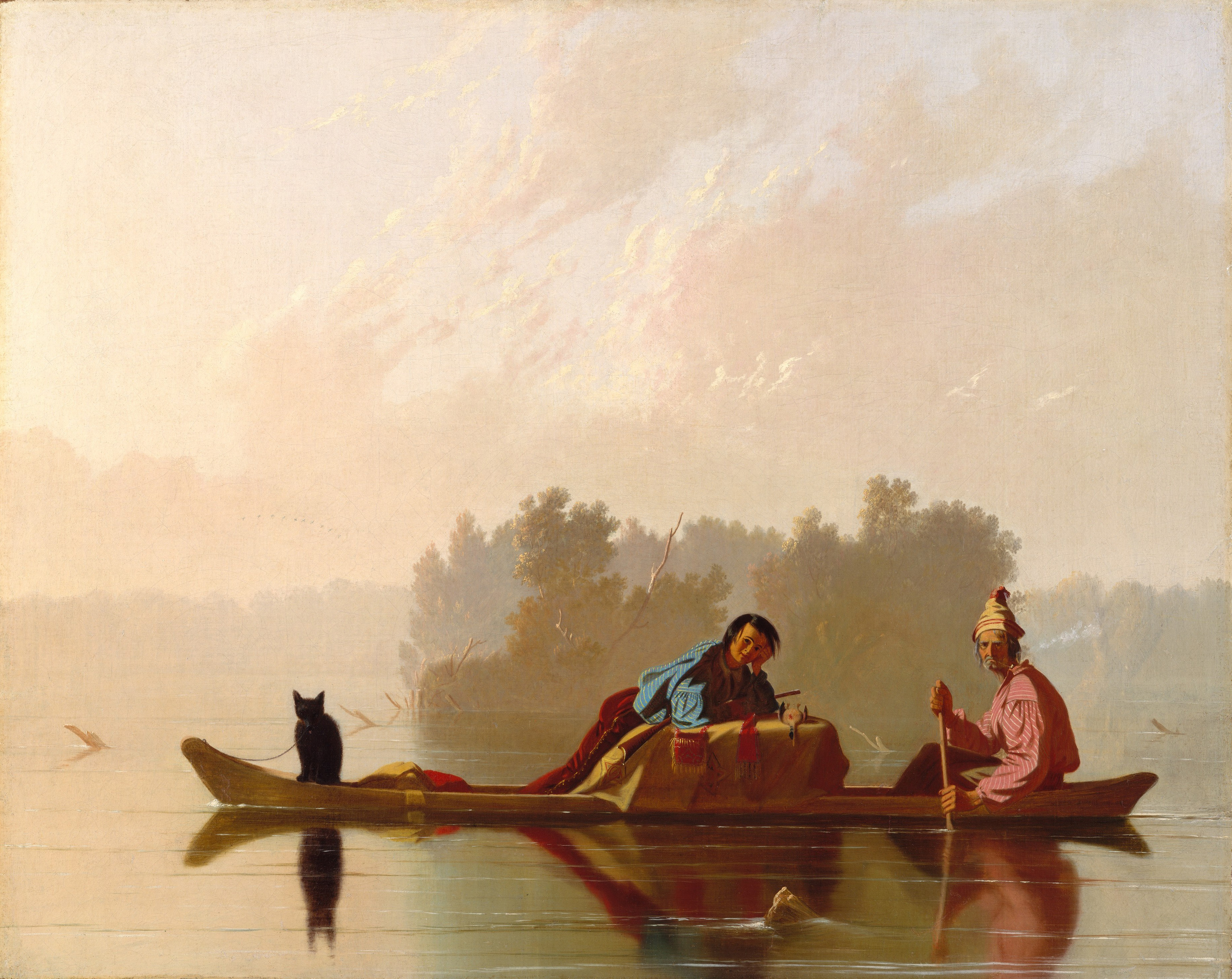
Fur Traders Descending the Missouri, c. 1845

From their bases in the Great Lakes area, the French steadily pushed their way down the Mississippi River valley to the Gulf of Mexico from 1682 onward. Initially, French relations with the Natchez Indians were friendly, and in 1716 the French established Fort Rosalie (modern Natchez, Mississippi) within the Natchez territory. In 1729, following several cases of French land fraud, the Natchez burned down Fort Rosalie and killed about 200 French settlers. In response, the French together with their allies, the Choctaw, waged a near-genocidal campaign against the Natchez as French and Choctaw set out to eliminate the Natchez as a people with the French often burning alive all of the Natchez they captured. Following the French victory over the Natchez in 1731, which resulted in the destruction of the Natchez people, the French were able to begin fur trading down the Arkansas River and greatly expanded the Arkansas Post to take advantage of the fur trade.

=== Mid-18th century ===
Deer skin trade was at its most profitable in the mid-18th century. The Creek rose up as the largest deer skin supplier, and the increase in supply only intensified European demand for deer skins. Native Americans continued to negotiate the most lucrative trade deals by forcing Britain, France, and Spain to compete for their supply of deer skins. In the 1750s and 1760s, the Seven Years' War disrupted France's ability to provide manufactures goods to its allies, the Choctaw and Chickasaw. The French and Indian War further disrupted trade, as the British blockaded French goods. The Cherokee allied themselves with France, who were driven out from the southeast in accordance with the Treaty of Paris in 1763. The British became the dominant trading power in the southeast.

While both the Cherokee and the Creek were the main trading partners of the British, their relationships with the British were different. The Creek adapted to the new economic trade system and managed to hold onto their old social structures. Originally, Cherokee land was divided into five districts, but the number soon grew to thirteen districts with 200 hunters assigned per district because of the deer skin demand.

Charleston and Savannah were the main trading ports for the export of deer skins. Deer skins became the most popular export and monetarily supported the colonies with the revenue produced by taxes on deer skins. Charleston's trade was regulated by the Indian Trade Commission, composed of traders who monopolized the market and profited off the sale of deer skins. From the early to mid-18th century, the deer skin exports of Charleston more than doubled. Charleston received tobacco and sugar from the West Indies and rum from the north in exchange for deer skins. In return, Great Britain sent woolens, guns, ammunition, iron tools, clothing, and other manufactured goods that were traded to the Native Americans.

=== Post-Revolutionary War ===
The Revolutionary War disrupted the deer skin trade, as the import of British manufactured goods was cut off. The deer skin trade had already begun to decline because of over-hunting of deer. The lack of trade caused the Native Americans to run out of items, such as guns, on which they depended. Some Indians, such as the Creek, tried to reestablish trade with the Spanish in Florida, where some loyalists were hiding as well. When the war ended with the British retreating, many tribes who had fought on their side were left unprotected and had to make peace and new trading deals with the new country. Many Native Americans were subject to violence from the new Americans who sought to settle their territory. The new American government negotiated treaties that recognized prewar borders, such as those with the Choctaw and Chickasaw, and allowed open trade.

In the two decades following the Revolutionary War, the United States' government established new treaties with the Native Americans that provided hunting grounds and terms of trade. But the value of deer skins dropped as domesticated cattle took over the market, and many tribes soon found themselves in debt. The Creek began to sell their land to the government to try and pay their debts, and infighting among the Indians made it easy for white settlers to encroach upon their lands. The government also sought to encourage Native Americans to give up their old ways of subses istence hunting, and turn to farming and domesticated cattle for trade.

== Environmental consequences ==
=== Effect on beaver population ===
Competition between the English and the French was disastrous on the beaver population. The status of beavers changed dramatically as it went from being a source of food and clothing for Indigenous peoples to a vital good for exchange with the Europeans. The French were constantly in search of cheaper fur and trying to cut off Indigenous middleman which led them to explore the interior all the way to Lake Winnipeg and the Central Plains. While some historians dispute the claims that the competition was predominantly responsible for over-exploitation of stocks, others have used empirical analysis to emphasize the changing economic incentives for Indigenous hunters and role of the Europeans in the matter. Calvin Martin holds that there was a breakdown of the relationship between man and animal among some Indigenous hunters who, adapting to the ways of the colonists, hunted to feed global fur markets with little consideration of the possibility of extinction. As competition increased between the English and French in the 16th century, fur also continued to be harvested by Aboriginal tribes, both for their own use and as middleman. All of this combined to cause a severe over-harvesting of beavers. Data from three of the trading posts of the Hudson's Bay Company show this trend.

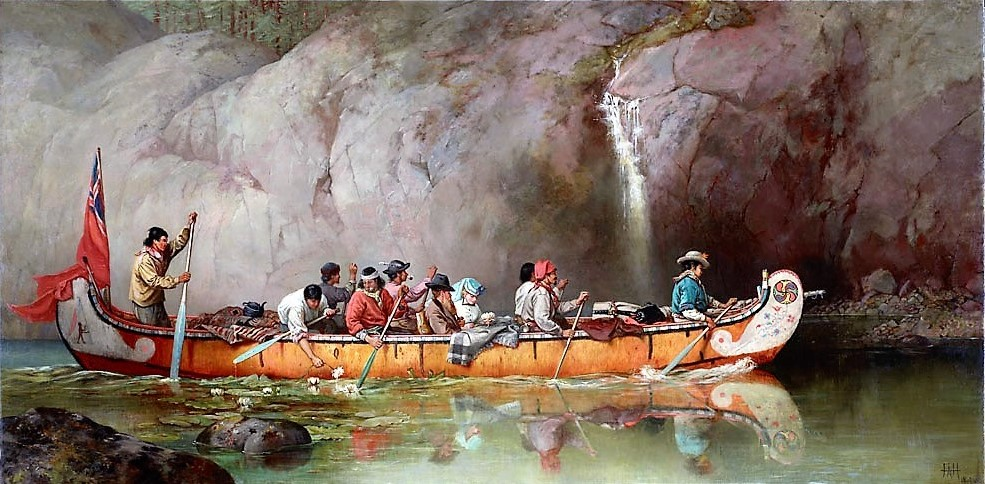
Canoe manned by voyageurs passing a waterfall

The English and French had very different trading hierarchical structures. The Hudson's Bay Company had a technical monopoly of the beaver trade within the drainage basin of Hudson Bay while the Compagnie d'Occident was given a monopoly of the beaver trade farther south. The English organized their trade on strictly hierarchical lines while the French used licenses to lease the use of their posts. This meant that the French incentivized the extension of trade, and French traders did indeed infiltrate much of the Great Lakes region. The French established posts on Lake Winnipeg, Lac des Praires and Lake Nipigon which represented a serious threat to flow of furs to the York Factory. The increasing penetration near English ports meant that the Native Americans had more than one place to sell their goods.

The simulation of beaver populations around trading posts are done by taking into account the beaver returns from each trading post, biological evidence on beaver population dynamics and contemporary estimates of beaver population densities. While the view that increased competition between the English and the French led to over-exploitation of beaver stocks by the Aboriginals does not receive uncritical support, most believe that Aboriginals were the primary actors in depleting animal stocks. There is a lack of critical discussion on other factors such as beaver population dynamics, the number of animals harvested, nature of property rights, prices, role of the English and the French in the matter.

The primary effect of increased French competition was that the English raised the prices they paid to the Aboriginals to harvest fur. The result of this was greater incentive for Aboriginals to increase harvests. Increased price will lead to a gap between demand and supply and to a higher equilibrium in terms of supply. Data from the trading posts show that the supply of beavers from the Aboriginals was price-elastic and therefore traders responded with increased harvests as prices rose. The harvests were further increased due to the fact that no tribe had an absolute monopoly near any trade and most of them were competing against each other to derive the maximum benefit from the presence of the English and the French.

Additionally, the problem of the commons is also glaringly visible in this matter. Open access to resources leads to no incentive to conserve stocks, and actors which try to conserve lose out compared to the others when it comes to maximizing economic output. Therefore, there appeared to be a lack of concern by tribes of the First Nations about the sustainability of the fur trade. The problem of over-exploitation is not helped by the fact that the efforts by the French to remove the middlemen such as the Huron who increasingly resented their influence meant that stocks were put under more pressure. All these factors contributed to an unsustainable trade pattern in furs which depleted beaver stocks very fast.

An empirical study done by Ann M. Carlos and Frank D. Lewis shows that apart from the settling to a lower level of stable population, further declines were caused by over-harvesting in two of the three English trading posts (Albany and York). The data from the third trading post are also very interesting in that the post did not come under French pressure and was therefore shielded from the kind of over-exploitation of stocks which resulted at the other trading posts. At Fort Churchill, the stocks of beaver adjusted to the maximum sustained yield level. The data from Churchill further reinforce the case of over-exploitation of stocks caused by the French-English competition.

== Social and cultural impact ==
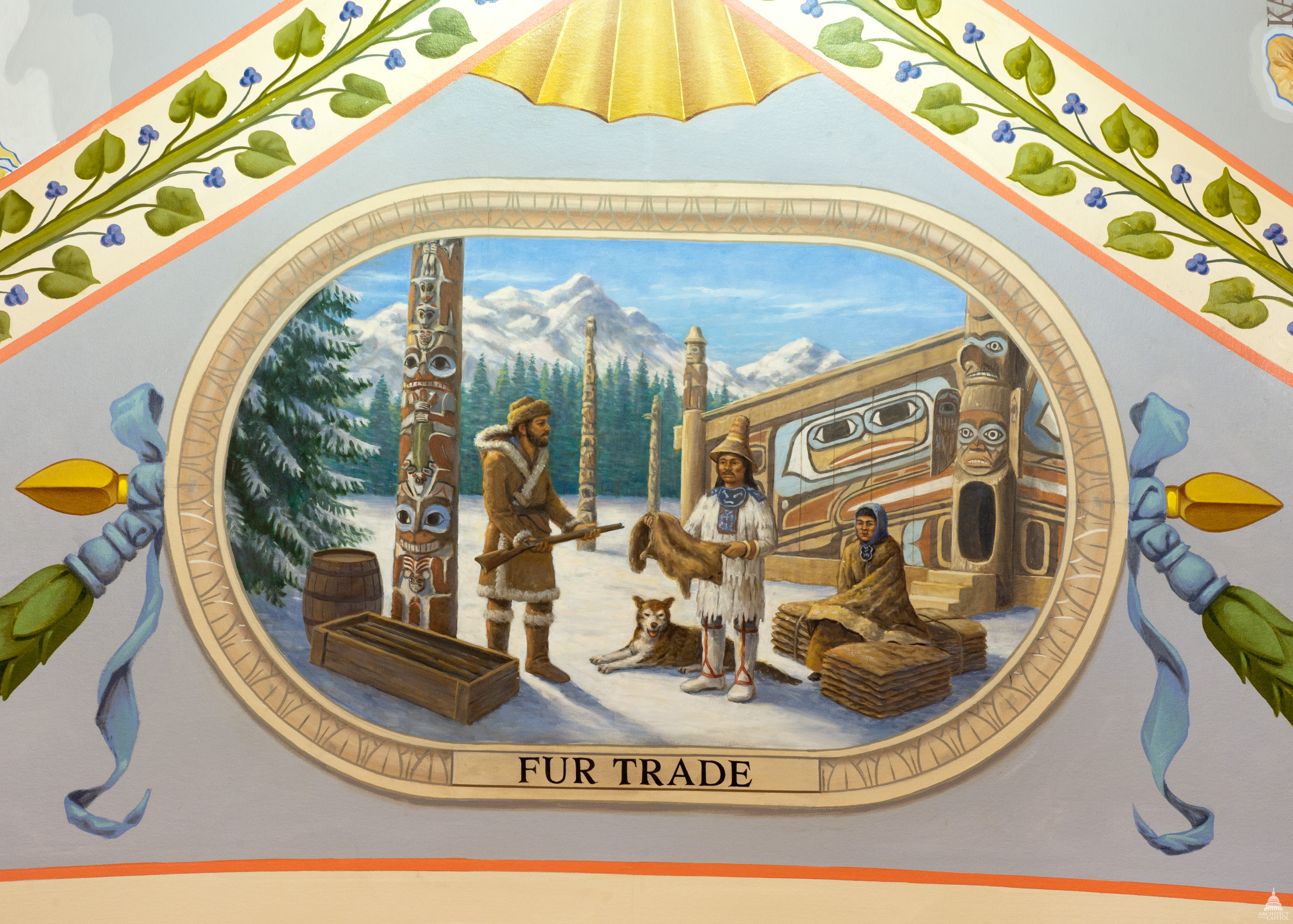
Westward Expansion Corridor, Cox Corridors, U.S. Capitol

The fur trade and its actors have played roles in films and popular culture. It was the topic of books and films, from James Fenimore Cooper via Irving Pichels Hudson's Bay of 1941, the popular Canadian musical My Fur Lady of 1957, till Nicolas Vaniers documentaries. In contrast to "the huddy buddy narration of Canada as Hudson's country", propagated either in popular culture or such elitist circles as the Beaver Club, founded 1785 in Montreal, the often male-centered scholarly description of the fur business does not fully describe the history.

Chantal Nadeau, a communication scientist in Montreal's Concordia University, refers to the "country wives" and "country marriages" between Indian women and European trappers and the Filles du Roy of the 18th century. Nadeau says that women have been described as a sort of commodity, "skin for skin", and they were essential to the sustainable prolongation of the fur trade. Nadeau describes fur as an essential, "the fabric" of Canadian symbolism and nationhood. She notes the controversies around the Canadian seal hunt, with Brigitte Bardot as a leading figure. Bardot, an actress, had been a model in the 1971 "Legend" campaign of the U.S. mink label Blackglama, for which she posed nude in fur coats. Her involvement in anti-fur campaigns shortly afterward was in response to a request by the noted author Marguerite Yourcenar, who asked Bardot to use her celebrity status to help the anti-sealing movement. Bardot had successes as an anti-fur activist and changed from sex symbol to the grown-up mama of "white seal babies". Nadeau related this to her later involvement in French right-wing politics. The anti-fur movement in Canada was intertwined with the nation's exploration of history during and after the Quiet Revolution in Quebec, until the roll back of the anti-fur movement in the late 1990s. PETA celebrity campaign: "I'd rather go naked than wear fur", turned around the "skin for skin" motto and symbology against fur and the fur trade.

== Modern day ==
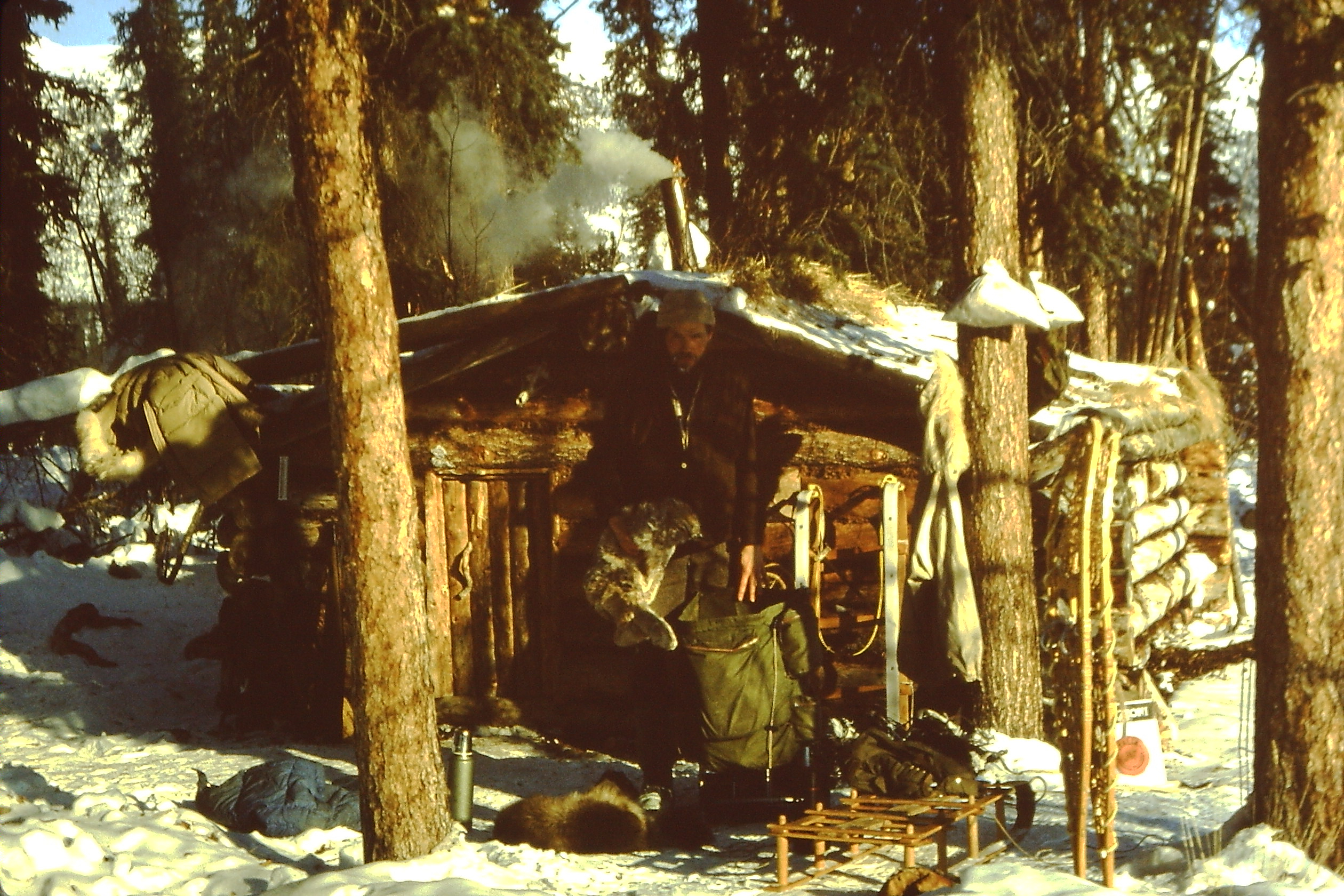
Trapper's cabin in Alaska, 1980s

Modern fur trapping and trading in North America is part of a wider $15 billion global fur industry where wild animal pelts make up only 15 percent of total fur output. In 2008, the global recession hit the fur industry and trappers especially hard with greatly depressed fur prices thanks to a drop in the sale of expensive fur coats and hats. Such a drop in fur prices reflects trends of previous economic downturns.

In 2013, the North American Fur Industry Communications (NAFIC) group was established as a cooperative public educational program for the fur industry in Canada and the U.S. NAFIC disseminates information via the Internet under the brand name "Truth About Fur".

== See also ==
- Deerskin trade
- Métis buffalo hunt
- Economic history of Canada
- Economic history of the United States
- Fur trade in Montana
- Mountain man
- Great Plains Indian Trading Networks before Lewis and Clark
- United States Government Fur Trade Factory System
- Fur trade companies
  - New Netherland Company
  - Hudson's Bay Company
  - North West Company
  - Missouri Fur Company
  - American Fur Company
  - Russian-American Company
  - Rocky Mountain Fur Company
