= Dennis Murphy =

Dennis Murphy may refer to:

- Dennis Murphy (Canadian politician) (1842–1917), Canadian businessman and political figure from Ontario
- Dennis Murphy (equestrian) (born 1944), American Olympic equestrian
- Dennis Murphy (journalist) (born 1946 or 1947), American television journalist
- Dennis Murphy (motorcyclist) (born 1974), motorcyclist and rally navigator
- Dennis Murphy (musician) (1934–2010), American composer, musician and artist
- Dennis Murphy (screenwriter) (1932–2005), American author and screenwriter
- Dennis Murphy (sports entrepreneur) (1926–2021), co-founder of the World Hockey Association
  - the Dennis A. Murphy Trophy, presented to the WHA's best defenceman, was named after him
- Dennis Murphy (Wisconsin politician), 19th-century member of the Wisconsin State Senate and postmaster
- Dennis A. Murphy (Massachusetts politician), member of the Massachusetts House of Representatives in 1911, and 1913–1918
- Dennis J. Murphy (1932–2023), United States Marine Corps general
- Dennis M. Murphy, member of the Massachusetts House of Representatives from 1993 to 1999

Denis Murphy may refer to:

- Denis Murphy (American politician), New Hampshire state legislator
- Denis Murphy (Australian politician) (1936–1984), Australian Labor Party politician and historian
- Denis Murphy (British politician) (born 1948), British Labour Party politician
- Denis Murphy (Canadian politician) (1870–1949), lawyer, judge and politician from British Columbia, Canada
- Denis Murphy (Carlow hurler) (born 1985), Irish hurler
- Denis Murphy (Cork hurler) (1939–2025), former Irish hurler
- Denis Murphy (musician) (1910–1974), Irish traditional musician from the Sliabh Luachra area
- Denis Murphy (Medal of Honor) (1830–1901), Medal of Honor recipient
- Denis Murphy (Tipperary hurler) (1901–1989), Irish hurler
- Denis Brownell Murphy, Irish miniature painter
