= John Tanner (captive) =

American fur trader

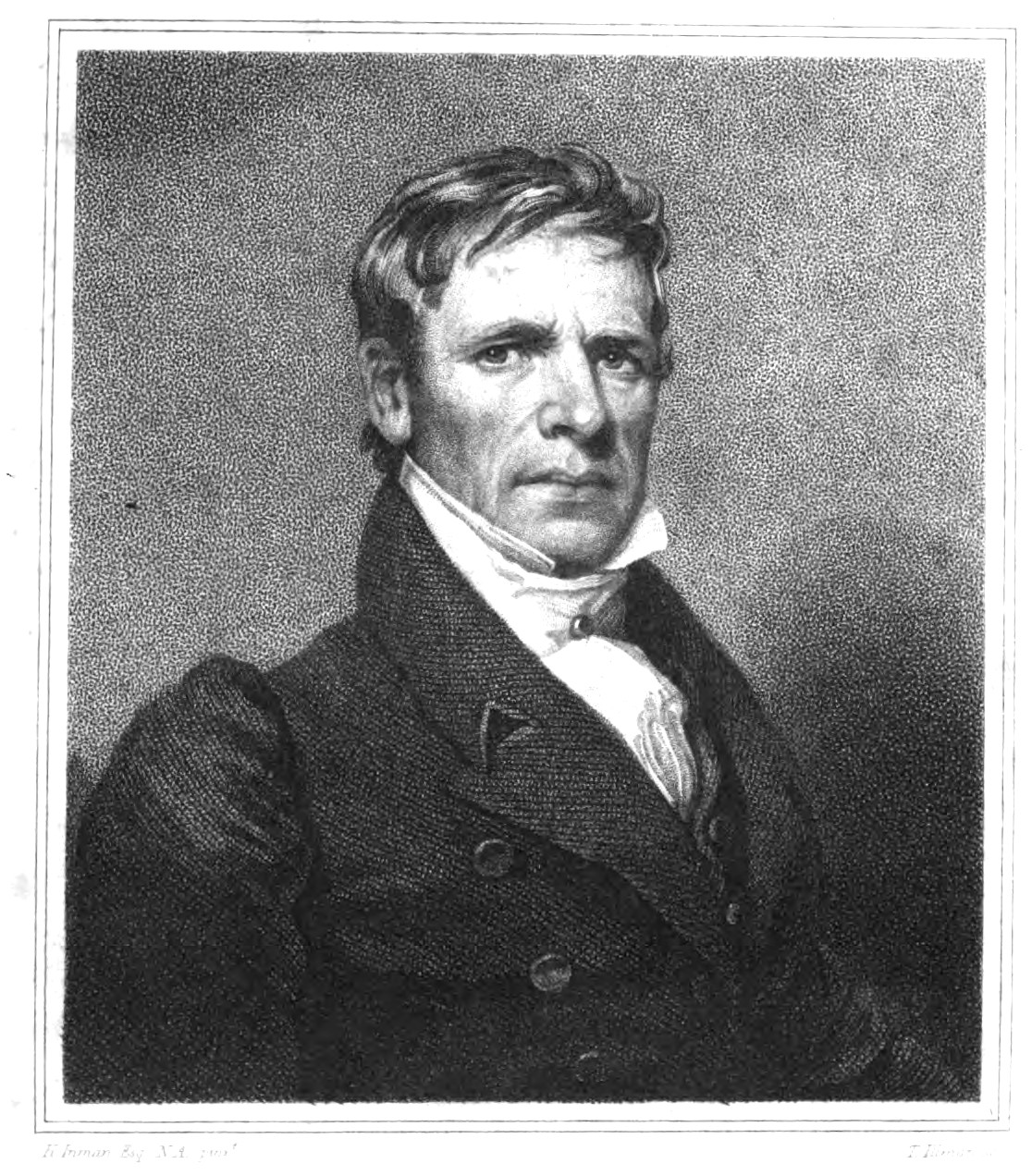
Portrait in A Narrative of the captivity and adventures of John Tanner, by Edwin James, London, 1830

John Tanner (c. 1780 – c. 1846), known also by his Ojibwe name Shaw-shaw-wa-ne-ba-se ("The Falcon", Zhaashaawanibiisi in modern spelling), (Note: Though the word normally means "swallow" in present-day usage; see entry in the Ojibwe People's Dictionary.) was captured by Odawa as a child after his family had homesteaded on the Ohio River in present-day Kentucky. He grew up among the Odawa and Ojibwe nations, becoming fully acculturated and learning the Saulteaux language. He married an Ojibwe woman, served as a guide for European fur traders, and worked as an interpreter. His story of life with the Ojibwe was published in 1830. Titled A Narrative of the Captivity and Adventures of John Tanner, it was a popular success and remains an important historical record.

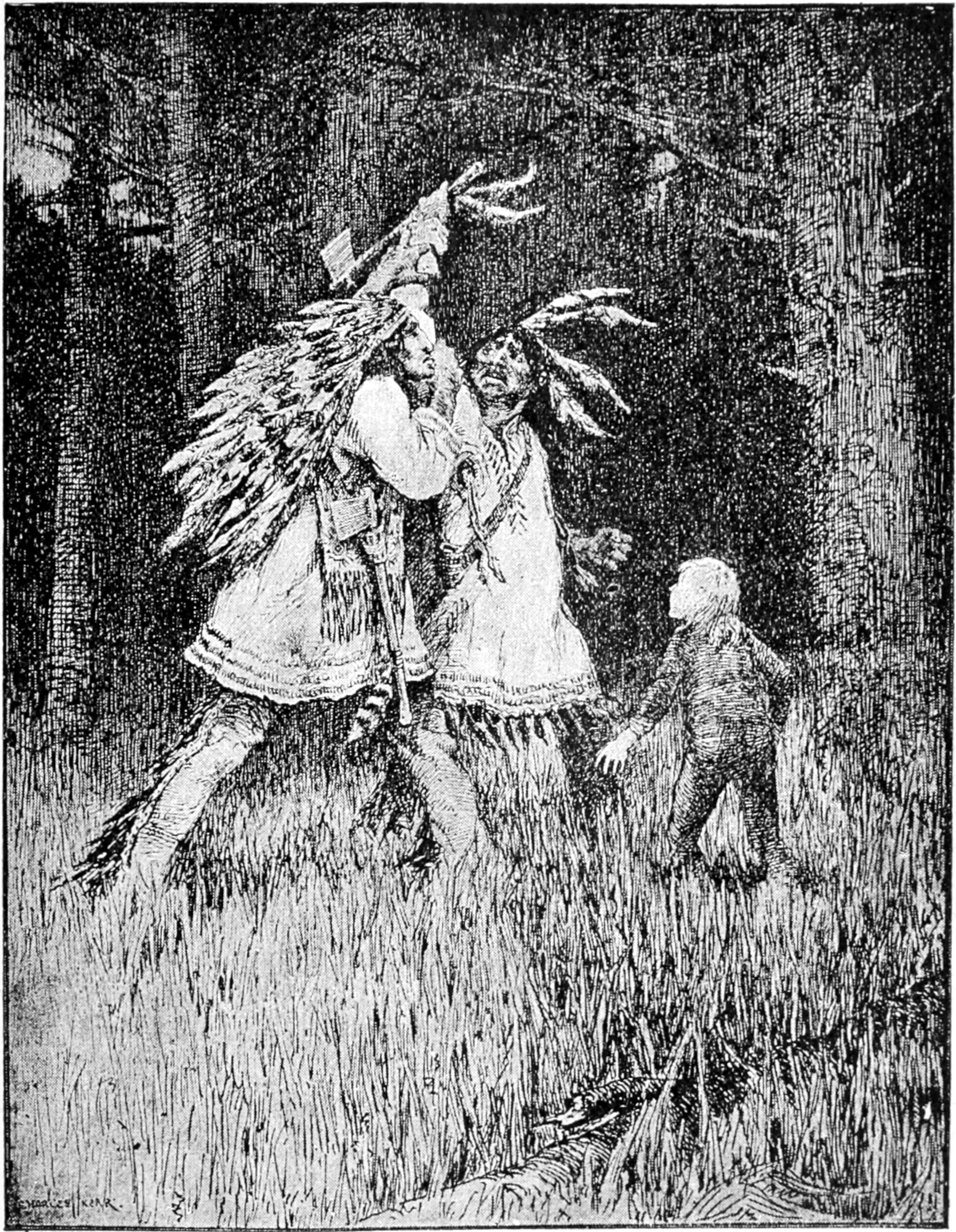
Illustration of Tanner's abduction, C. H. M. Kerr for The True Story Book, 1893

== Early life ==
John Tanner was born about 1780. His father, also named John Tanner, was a former preacher from Virginia. The boy’s mother died when he was two and in 1789 the family settled on the Ohio River in Kentucky near the confluence with the Great Miami River. It was considered dangerous country as settlers competed for territory with the local Shawnee people who fought to defend their lands.

In 1789 at the age of nine, Tanner was kidnapped by two Odawa men and carried north into Northwest Territory (into an area that would become Michigan Territory in 1805). He was badly mistreated during the first two years of captivity but then was sold to Netnokwa, an Odawa woman who adopted Tanner and treated him more kindly. She helped him gain the skills he needed to survive and encouraged him in rites of passage such as killing a bear and participating in his first war party. From 1790 to about 1820 Tanner lived with the Ojibwe and Saulteaux in the Great Lakes and Red River regions.

When Tanner lived among Ojibwe and Saulteaux, their traditional life-style as hunters and trappers in the northern forests was beginning to change. The fur trade was drawing the tribes away from subsistence hunting and encouraging fur trapping for profit. Deceitful traders, a shortage of game, and the introduction of firearms and alcohol all had a negative impact on Ojibwe living in the region.

In 1800, when he was 20, Tanner married an Ojibwe woman, Mis-kwa-bun-o-kwa, the niece of Michigan fur trader, Magdelaine LaFramboise. In 1801 he met a fur trader, Daniel Harmon, who noted in his diary that Tanner spoke only Saulteaux, was regarded as a chief by his people, and was "like a Saulteaux in every way except color." Around 1807 his first wife left him and in 1810 he remarried an Indigenous woman known as Therezia. During both marriages he quarrelled with his in-laws and was threatened with violence. By 1812 he was considering a return to his family in Kentucky but the War of 1812 made travel impossible.

== Fur trade and family reunion ==
In 1812 Thomas Douglas, 5th Earl of Selkirk established a colony in the region on land purchased from the Hudson's Bay Company. Tanner assisted the colonists by hunting bison during their first winter when food was scarce. In 1817, Selkirk employed Tanner as a guide and they set out to recapture Fort Douglas from the English fur trading North West Company. After their success, Lord Selkirk took an interest in Tanner. Using Tanner's vague memories of his childhood, Selkirk located his family in the United States and helped to reunite them. Travelling with his second wife and children, Tanner spent the years 1818-1822 in pursuit of his family. His wife settled on Mackinac Island and their children attended missionary school. Ultimately, however, the cultural gap proved too big and Tanner gave up hopes of returning to his previous life.

Tanner returned to the Canadian territories, where he worked for a time as a trader with the American Fur Company on Rainy Lake. In 1823 he tried to reclaim his children from his first marriage but his former wife refused to surrender them and engaged someone to kill him. Although badly wounded he survived the attack but his children and their mother vanished while he was convalescing.

== Tanner's Narrative ==
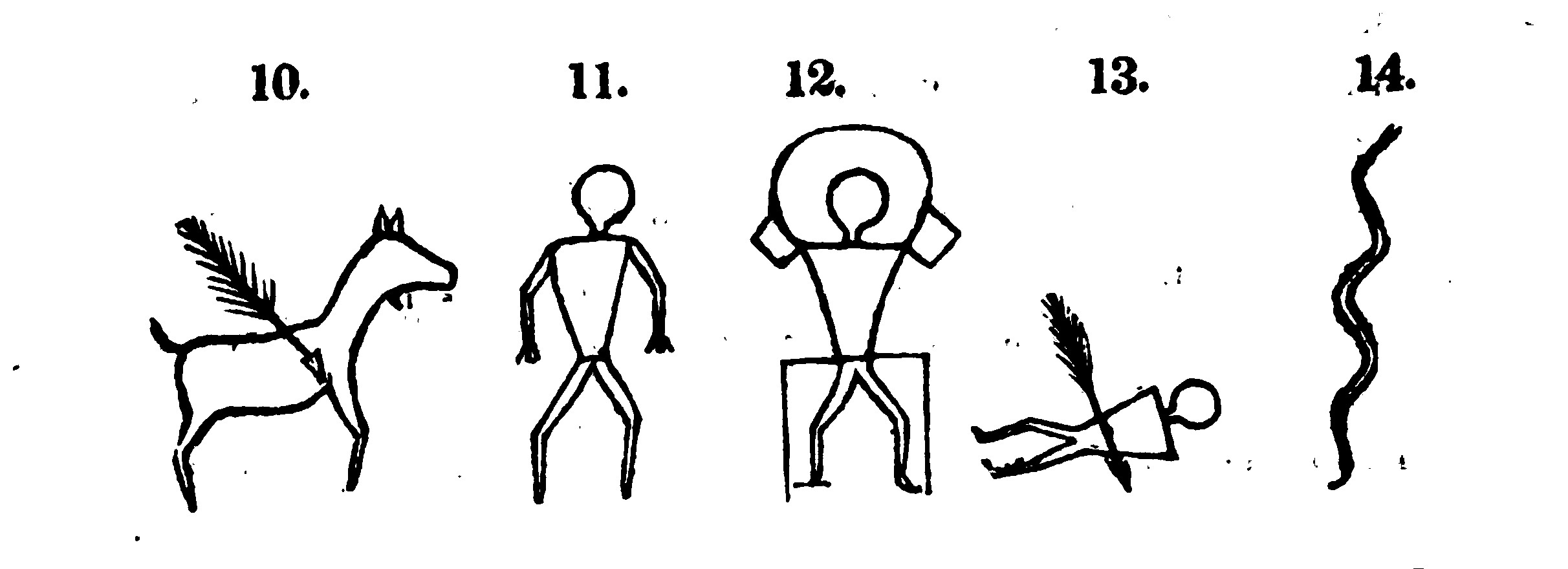
Mnemonic figures for an Indian song, in Narrative

In 1827, after a lengthy recovery, he settled with his second wife back on Mackinac Island and worked as an interpreter at a U.S. army outpost. It was here that he met explorer, botanist, and physician Edwin James. James transcribed Tanner's dramatic story of life among the Ojibwe. Published in 1830, A Narrative of the Captivity and Adventures of John Tanner was a popular success as well as an important and detailed historical record of the Ojibwe people during a critical period of change. It was later translated into German and French.

On 19 July 1831, on the way back to Sault Saint Marie from dealing with the publication of his book, Tanner encountered political scientist and philosopher Alexis de Tocqueville on the ferry from Detroit and gave him a copy of his Narrative. This was a significant encounter, for Tanner's book provided the basis for Tocqueville's understanding of Indigenous societies in the North American wilderness and is quoted in his Democracy in America.

Tanner also collaborated with Edwin James to create an Ojibwe translation of the New Testament.

== Life as an interpreter ==
Tanner moved to Sault Ste. Marie in 1828 and began working as an interpreter for the Indian agent, Henry Rowe Schoolcraft. Tanner became involved in a feud between Schoolcraft and Abel Bingham, a Baptist missionary, over control of the local mission school. Eventually, both Schoolcraft and Bingham accused Tanner of siding with the other and betraying their trust.

By 1833 Tanner was unemployed and essentially lived as an outcast on the edge of town for the rest of his life. In 1846 his cabin was burned to the ground and days later he disappeared at the same time that Schoolcraft's younger brother, James Schoolcraft, was found murdered. Townspeople quickly suspected that Tanner had killed Schoolcraft but Tanner was never apprehended and his guilt was never proven conclusively. Years later, Tanner's body was uncovered in a bog not far from town.

A grandson of his, also named John Tanner, homesteaded on the Little Saskatchewan River where he ran a ferry. The settlement became known as "Tanner's Crossing". It is the present-day site of Minnedosa, Manitoba.
