= Denis Brownell Murphy =

Irish painter

Denis Brownell Murphy (c. 1745–1755 – 1842) was an Irish miniature-painter.

== Life ==
Denis Brownell Murphy was a native of Dublin. He was a patriot and strong sympathiser with the cause of United Ireland in 1798, but in that year removed for professional reasons to Whitehaven in England with his wife and family. In 1802 they removed to Newcastle-on-Tyne, but in 1803 came to London, settling first at Hanwell. Murphy had considerable practice as a miniature-painter, and was in that capacity attached to the household of Princess Charlotte, being in 1810 appointed painter in ordinary to Her Royal Highness. He copied one or two of Lely's famous Beauties, then at Windsor Castle (afterwards at Hampton Court), and by command of the Princess completed a series of miniature copies of these, adding some from pictures not at Windsor. Murphy had apartments assigned him at Windsor during the progress of this work, which was from time to time inspected and approved by the royal family. The set was not completed at the time of the Princess's death, which put an end to the work and to Murphy's connection with the court. The paintings were sent in to Prince Leopold, with a claim for payment, but to the painter's great disappointment were declined and returned. The set were, however, purchased by a friend, Sir Gerard Noel, and it was suggested that use should be made of them by having them engraved as a series, with illustrative text from the pen of Murphy's daughter, Mrs. Anna Brownell Jameson. This work was successfully completed and published in 1833 under the title of The Beauties of the Court of King Charles the Second. Murphy occasionally exhibited miniatures in enamel or on ivory at the Royal Academy from 1800 to 1827, but his work did not attain any great distinction. The latter part of his life was very closely connected with that of his more famous daughter, Mrs. Jameson.

Murphy died in March 1842, leaving by his wife, who survived him, five daughters, of whom the eldest, Anna Brownell, married Robert Jameson, and was the well-known writer on art. Of the others, Camilla became Mrs. Sherwin, and died on 28 May 1886, at Brighton, aged 87, and Louisa became Mrs. Bate, while Eliza and Charlotte Alicia died unmarried, the former at Brighton on 31 March 1874 in her seventy-ninth year, the latter at Ealing on 13 June 1876, aged 71.

== Bibliography ==
- Caffrey, Paul (2009). "Murphy, Denis Brownell". In Dictionary of Irish Biography. Cambridge University Press, Royal Irish Academy. n.p.
- Cust, Lionel Henry (1894). "Murphy, Denis Brownell" . In Lee, Sidney (ed.). Dictionary of National Biography. Vol. 39. London: Smith, Elder & Co. p. 337.
- Strickland, Walter G. (1968). "Murphy, Denis Brownell". In A Dictionary of Irish Artists. Vol. 2. New York, NY: Hacker Art Books. pp. 157–159.
