= Anna Brownell Jameson =

Irish-born English writer (1794–1860)

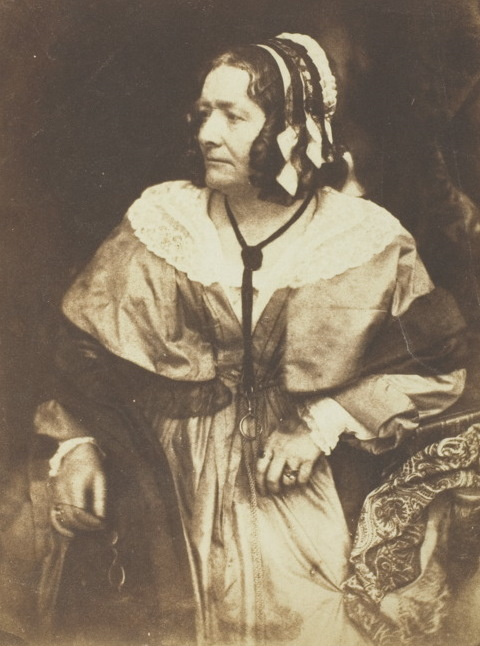
- Salt print of Jameson in 1844 by Hill & Adamson
- Born: 17 May 1794; Dublin
- Died: 17 March 1860 (aged 65); Ealing, London
- Occupations: Writer, feminist, and art historian

Anna Brownell Jameson (17 May 1794 – 17 March 1860) was an Anglo-Irish art historian whose work spanned art and literary criticism, philosophy, travel writing, and feminism. She became very well known for her extensive writings. Jameson was connected to some of the most prominent names of the period including Joanna Baillie, Fanny Kemble, Elizabeth Barrett-Browning and Robert Browning, Harriet Martineau, Ottilie von Goethe (the daughter-in-law of Goethe), Lady Byron, Harriet Hosmer, Ada Lovelace, Charles and Elizabeth Eastlake, and Barbara Leigh Smith Bodichon. She was also a pioneer of the women's rights movement in the UK.

== Biography ==
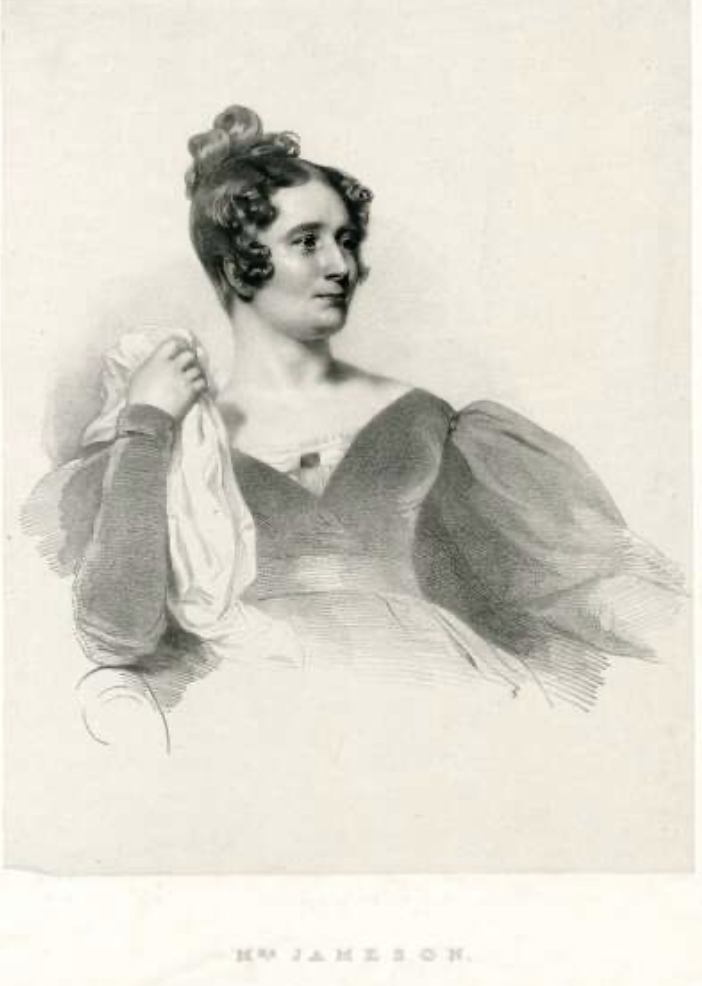

Anna Murphy was born in Dublin, 17 May 1794. Her father, Denis Brownell Murphy (died 1842), was a miniaturist and enamel painter. He moved to England in 1798 with his wife Johanna and four daughters (of whom Anna was the eldest) and eventually settled at Hanwell, London.

At sixteen years of age, she became governess in the family of Charles Paulet, 13th Marquess of Winchester. In 1821 she was engaged to lawyer and later Upper Canada jurist Robert Jameson. The engagement was broken off, and Anna Murphy accompanied a young pupil to Italy, writing a "autobiographical" narrative under the guise of an unnamed and ailing young woman who eventually dies. She gave this diary to a bookseller on condition of receiving a guitar if he secured any profits. Colburn ultimately published it as The Diary of an Ennuyée (1826), which attracted much attention, not least because the identity of the writer was soon discovered creating a scandal among reviewers in particular who felt they had been duped. For Anna however, it was the first taste of notoriety. Anna Murphy was governess to the children of Edward Littleton, later created Baron Hatherton, from 1821 to 1825, when she relented and married Jameson.

The marriage proved unhappy. In 1829, when Jameson was appointed puisne judge in the island of Dominica, he left Anna in England (never sending for her during his time there despite repeated promises), and she visited Continental Europe again with her father. In that year she made her name when the Loves of the Poets was published. The book attracted a poem by Mrs. Cornwell Baron Wilson in tribute.

The first work which displayed her powers of original thought was her Characteristics of Women: Moral, Poetical, and Historical (1832). She used her analyses of William Shakespeare's heroines to put forward a subtle account of female virtue. This book, which later became known as Shakespeare's Heroines, was incredibly successful. Harriet Martineau remarked that "Mrs Jameson's world-wide reputation dates from the publication of this book". The book was reissued 28 times during the nineteenth century alone. As Anne Russell says, "So widely was Shakspeare’s Heroines read that almost every subsequent nineteenth-century writer on Shakespeare’s women characters mentions the book".

German literature and art had aroused much interest in the United Kingdom of Great Britain and Ireland, and Jameson paid her first visit to the German Confederation in 1833. The conglomerations of hard lines, cold colours and pedantic subjects which decorated Munich under the patronage of King Ludwig I of Bavaria, were new to the world, and Jameson's enthusiasm first gave them an English reputation. In 1834 she published the book Visits and Sketches at Home and Abroad about her German travels, which included many analyses of art and literature. This book was popular as well and meant that Jameson was important for importing German thought and culture into Victorian Britain.

In 1836, Jameson was summoned to Canada by her husband, who had been appointed to the Court of Chancery of the province of Upper Canada. Jameson and her husband had already lived apart for over four years, during which Anna made a good living for herself as a writer. She made no secret of the fact that she was unhappy in her marriage. Upon her arrival, her husband failed to meet her at New York and she was left to make her way alone in winter to Toronto. Here she began the travelogue of her journey, Winter Studies and Summer Rambles in Canada, which was published in Britain in 1838. She wrote in this book of her initial distaste for Toronto, describing it as "ugly" and "inefficient." After eight months of travelling and writing in Canada, she felt it useless to prolong a life far from all ties of family happiness and opportunities for a woman of her class and education. Before leaving, she undertook a journey to the depths of the Indian settlements in Canada; she explored Lake Huron, and saw much of emigrant and indigenous life unknown to colonial travellers. She returned to Great Britain in 1838.

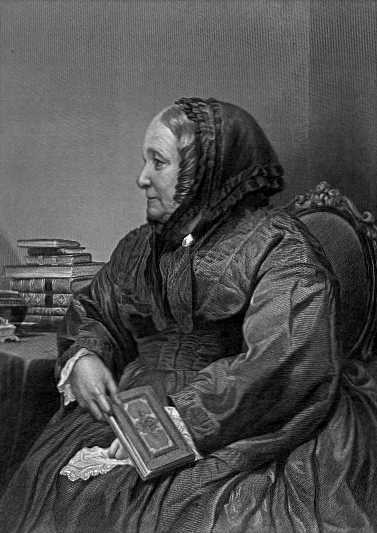

At this period Jameson began making careful notes of the chief private art collections in and near London. The result appeared in her Companion to the Private Galleries (1842), followed in the same year by the Handbook to the Public Galleries. She published Memoirs of the Early Italian Painters in 1845, which had previously been serialised in the Penny Magazine. That same year she visited her friend Ottilie von Goethe. Her friendship with Annabella Byron, 11th Baroness Wentworth, dates from about this time and lasted for some seven years until the two fell out. This seems to have been because Byron's daughter Ada Lovelace confided in Jameson about her involvement in a gambling scheme and Jameson kept the secret from her mother, which emerged after Lovelace died.

A volume of essays published in 1846, Memoirs and Essays Illustrative of Art, Literature and Social Morals, contains Jameson's important essay The House of Titian. In this she discussed how we can engage with and access art from past eras. She wrote: "The real value, the real immortality of the beautiful productions of old art lies in their truth as embodying the spirit of a particular age. We have not so much outgrown that spirit, as we have comprehended it in a still larger sphere of experience and existence. We do not repudiate it; … but we carry it with us into a wider, grander horizon. It is no longer the whole, but a part, as that which is now the whole to us shall hereafter be but a part; for thus the soul of humanity spreads into a still widening circle, embracing the yet unknown, the yet unrevealed, unattained."

In 1842, Mrs. Jameson began work on what became her most successful work of all: her six-volume book series Sacred and Legendary Art. The first parts were serialised in the journal The Athenaeum from 1845-1846. The complete set of books comprised volumes 1 and 2, The poetry of Sacred and Legendary Art, which covered artistic portrayals of the angels, evangelists, apostles, church doctors, and Mary Magdalene in the first volume and the saints and martyrs in the second. Volume 3, Legends of the monastic orders, dealing with artistic portrayals of these orders, came out in 1850; and in 1852, Mrs. Jameson published volume 4, Legends of the Madonna. The last two volumes were unfinished when she died and were completed in 1864 by her friend Lady Eastlake, as The History of Our Lord in Art.

The series was very popular. The first two volumes were reissued 28 times in the nineteenth century alone; the third volume, 21 times; and the fourth, eighteen times. When she died in 1860, the New York Times said that Mrs. Jameson had "done probably more than any other writer to familiarize the public mind with the principles of art; and her perception of the inner spirit of a great work was so thorough, that its mere statement was eloquence". According to William King in an encyclopedia of women's achievements from 1902, "As a writer on matters of art and taste Mrs. Jameson probably surpassed all other women writers and on the literature of art she is conceded by many to stand next to Ruskin".

She also took a keen interest in women's education, rights, and employment. Her early essay on The Relative Social Position of Mothers and Governesses was the work of one who knew both sides; and in no respect does she more clearly prove the falseness of the position she describes than in the certainty with which she predicts its eventual reform. To her we owe the first popular enunciation of the principle of male and female co-operation in works of mercy and education. In her later years she took up a succession of subjects all bearing on the same principles of active benevolence and the best ways of carrying them into practice. Sisters of charity, hospitals, penitentiaries, prisons, and workhouses all claimed her interest – all more or less included under those definitions of "the communion of love and communion of labour" which are inseparably connected with her memory. To the clear and temperate forms in which she brought the results of her convictions before her friends in the shape of private lectures (published as Sisters of Charity, 1855, and The Communion of Labour, 1856) may be traced the source whence later reformers and philanthropists took counsel and courage.
