= Denis Murphy (American politician) =

American politician

Member of New Hampshire House of Representatives for Cheshire 11
- Incumbent
- Assumed office December 4, 2024
- Preceded by: Zachary Nutting
- Succeeded by: Lindseigh Picard (elect)

Personal details
- Party: Republican

Denis Vincent Murphy II is an American politician. He is a member of the New Hampshire House of Representatives.
