= Netnokwa =

Odawa leader

Netnokwa (also Net-no-kwa; c. 1740s – after 1815) was an Odawa leader and fur trader. She adopted the captive boy John Tanner into her family, purchasing him from an Odawa relative when he was around 12 years old. She married an Ojibwe man and served as the leader of her band. While little is known of Netnokwa's early life, she figured prominently in Tanner's 1830 book A Narrative of the Captivity and Adventures of John Tanner.

== Early life and family ==
Netnokwa was Odawa, born in the central Great Lakes region, probably in the 1740s or early 1750s. Little is known of her early life, with most accounts being based on A Narrative of the Captivity and Adventures of John Tanner, the life story of John Tanner, whom she adopted into her family around 1791. She was part of the Midewiwin society and became a respected fur trader.

Netnokwa was married to Tawgaweninne, an Ojibwe man whose people were from Red River. His family were among the first of the western Ojibwa. He was about 17 years younger than her and had two other wives. As the eldest woman, Netnokwa was considered the head of the household. Tanner related that Tawgaweninne "was but of secondary importance in the family, as everything belonged to Netnokwa, and she had the direction in all affairs of any moment." Her management of her family's economic affairs was characterized as adroit and by the end of the 18th century, she had become a prominent fur trader in the region. She participated in drinking parties at the trading posts in the fall and spring. According to Tanner, whenever she drank, she ensured that all of the Indians drank as well.

== Adoption of John Tanner ==
Netnokwa led a band at L'Arbre Croche (Ojibwe: Waganagisi) and attended a council at Mackinac where tribal representatives met with British agents. She met with Manitoogeshik there, an Odawa relation of hers, who told her of John Tanner (Zhaashaawanibiisi), a boy he had captured. Having lost her own son Kewatin, Netnokwa sought to arrange to adopt Tanner into her family. She was able to barter for Tanner, travelling to meet Manitoogeshik, and bringing with her many valuables, including tobacco, blankets, and a 10-gallon keg of whiskey. Netnokwa was likely no older than in her 50s at the time.

Tanner joined Netnokwa's family and they moved to Saginaw Bay, Michigan. Netnokwa nurtured the boy, instructing him in the ways of Ojibwa culture and teaching him how to survive in the northern woods as well as ritual and ethical traditions. In Tanner's narrative, Netnokwa is referred to either as his mother or "the old woman", which is likely an English translation of the Ojibwe term of respect mindimooyenh. She used her dreams to help her sons in hunting. At four points in Tanner's narrative, during times of near-starvation, Netnokwa left the warmth of their lodge to pray to the spirits. She would return with medicine bags and tell of her dreams which revealed where a bear or moose could be found. After Tanner caught his first sturgeon, she prepared the feast of Oskenetahgwawin, in honor of the first animal of each species killed. Tanner wrote that Netnokwa was "regarded as principal chief" of the Odawa. When she approached Fort Mackinac in a canoe, she would raise a flag and receive a gunshot salute from the fort's soldiers.

Netnokwa brought her family west after deciding to visit the relatives of her husband. He died during the journey. In the late 1790s they arrived at the fork of the Red and Assiniboine Rivers. After arriving in the Red River region (then part of the Red River Colony, now Manitoba), French-Canadian fur trader Charles Chaboillez recorded exchanging gifts with and giving credit to one "Old Courte Oreille & Two Sons", possibly a reference to Netnokwa, Tanner, and Tanner's adoptive brother. Netnokwa traded meat and furs with Chaboillez, and he later wrote that he had given her tobacco and rum "to encourage her to return" with furs and other goods. By 1800, Netnokwa's family, including Tanner, were living west of the Red River.

Netnokwa served as matriarch of the extended family, gathering together orphans and displaced people. Her role was likely not atypical for an Odawa woman of her era. Anthropologist Laura Peers wrote that "while Netnokwa was an exceptionally strong and charismatic woman who actually led a band, with a great deal of spiritual power backing her assertiveness and leadership, her influence was presumably neither unprecedented nor unparalleled." When Netnokwa was displeased with the unwillingness to hunt and laziness of Wawbebenaisa, the husband of her niece, she threw him out of her tent, essentially divorcing him from his wife. Later, upon learning that he was destitute and had no wife, she invited him back into the family. Netnokwa made decisions about when and where her family moved. In one instance, when the family came to what she thought was a poor sugaring site, she had the family move to a better location. When Tanner started courting Miskwabunokwa (Red Sky of the Morning), Netnokwa approved of the relationship. Tanner recognized that Netnokwa had the responsibility of finding wives for the men, only marrying Miskwabunokwa after Netnokwa told him he was obliged to complete his courtship by custom.

== Death and legacy ==
Netnokwa died sometime after 1815, probably by 1820.

Netnokwa figured prominently in Tanner's book, A Narrative of the Captivity and Adventures of John Tanner, which was transcribed by Edwin James and published in 1930. Drawing on Tanner's narrative, Netnokwa was fictionalized as a character in the 1836 novel Elkswatawa by James Strange French and the 1844 play Tecumseh and the Prophet of the West by George Jones. In an introduction to modern printing of Tanner's book, writer Louise Erdrich characterized Netnokwa as both charismatic and hilarious, writing that she was the "most arresting character in the drama of Tanner's life."
