= Denis Murphy (Tipperary hurler) =

Irish hurler

Personal information
- Native name: Donncha Ó Murchú (Irish)
- Nickname: Bunny
- Born: 14 December 1910 Thurles, County Tipperary, Ireland
- Died: 25 March 1989 (aged 78) Thurles, County Tipperary, Ireland

Sport
- Sport: Hurling
- Position: Full-forward
Club
- Years: Club
- Thurles Sarsfields
Inter-county
- Years: County
- 1936-1940: Tipperary
Inter-county titles
- Munster titles: 1
- All-Irelands: 1
- NHL: 0

Denis Murphy (14 December 1910 – 25 March 1989) was an Irish hurler. At club level he played for Thurles Sarsfields and was the full-forward on the Tipperary senior hurling team that won the 1937 All-Ireland Championship.

Murphy made his first appearance for the Tipperary senior hurling team during the 1936 Munster Championship, having earlier played for the Tipperary junior team. In 1937 he won an All-Ireland Championship medal when Tipperary defeated Kilkenny, having earlier won a Munster Championship medal.

== Honours ==
Tipperary

- All-Ireland Senior Hurling Championship (1): 1937
- Munster Senior Hurling Championship (1): 1937
