= Schoolcraft =

Schoolcraft may refer to:

== People ==
- Adrian Schoolcraft (born 1976), former New York Police Department officer
- Alan Schoolcraft, American politician
- Jane Johnston Schoolcraft (1800-1842), Native American author
- Henry Schoolcraft (1793–1864), American geographer, geologist, and ethnologist
- Mary Howard Schoolcraft (1820-1878), American writer

== Places ==
- Schoolcraft College, Livonia, Michigan
- Schoolcraft, Michigan, a village in Kalamazoo County
- Schoolcraft County, Michigan
- Schoolcraft Township, Houghton County, Michigan
- Schoolcraft Township, Kalamazoo County, Michigan
- Schoolcraft Township, Hubbard County, Minnesota
- Schoolcraft River, a tributary of the Mississippi River in Minnesota
