= Elmwood (Sault Ste. Marie, Michigan) =

Historic house in Michigan, United States

- U.S. National Register of Historic Places
- Michigan State Historic Site
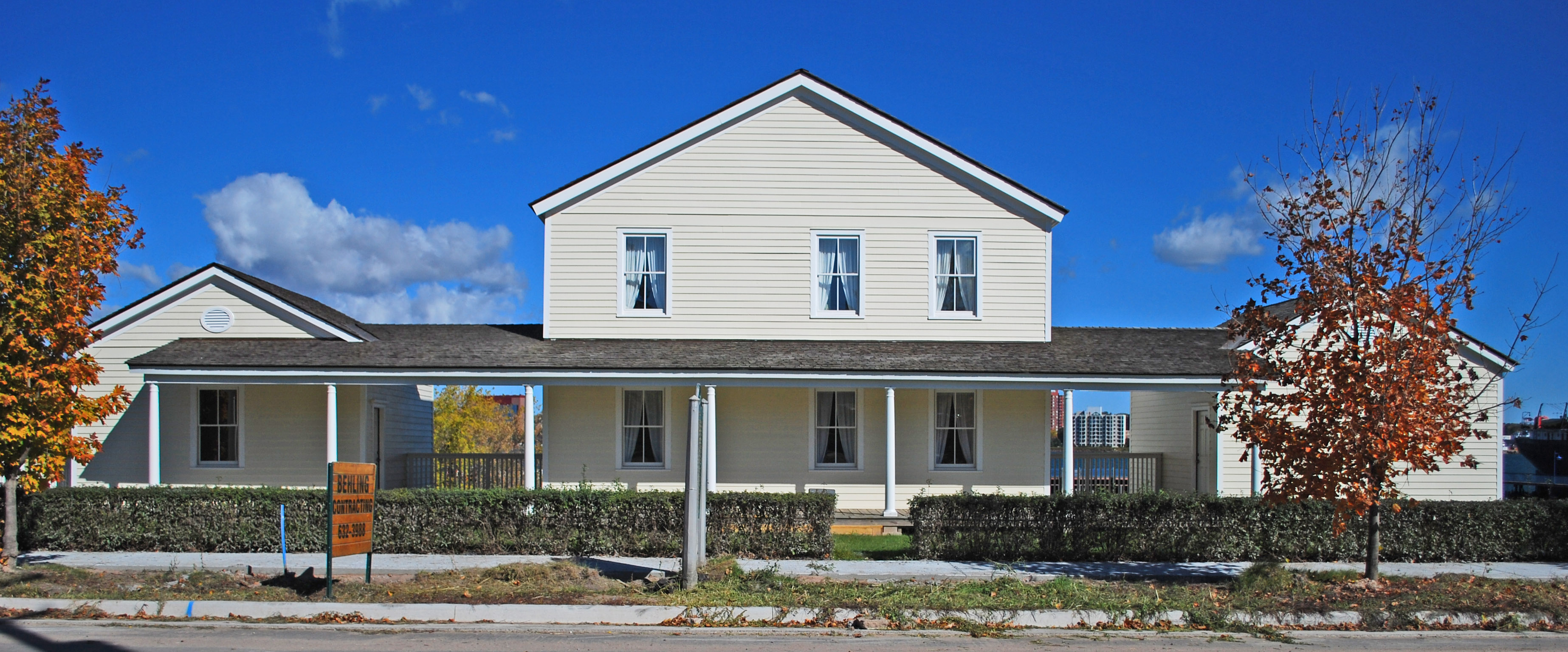

- Location within Michigan Location within the United States
- Interactive map
- Location: 435 E. Water St., Sault Ste. Marie, Michigan
- Coordinates: 46°29′57″N 84°20′18″W
- Area: less than one acre
- Built: 1827
- Architect: Obed Wait, Et al.
- Architectural style: Federal
- NRHP reference No.: 74000982

Significant dates
- Added to NRHP: February 25, 1974
- Designated MSHS: September 25, 1956

Elmwood, also known as the Henry Rowe Schoolcraft House, the Schoolcraft House or the Indian Agency, is a frame house located at 435 East Water Street in Sault Ste. Marie, Michigan. It was designated a Michigan State Historic Site in 1956 and listed on the National Register of Historic Places in 1974.

== Henry Rowe Schoolcraft ==
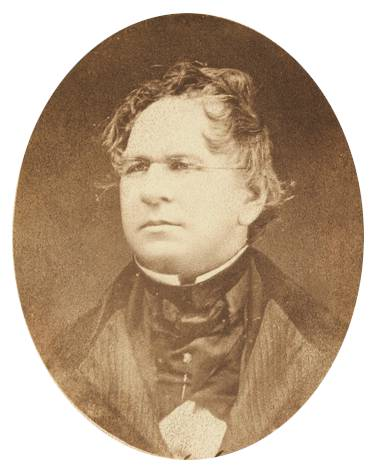
Henry Rowe Schoolcraft, 1855

Henry Rowe Schoolcraft (March 28, 1793 - Dec. 10, 1864) was a notable author, explorer, and Native American culture expert. Schoolcraft was born on March 28, 1793, in Albany County, New York. In 1817, he participated in a mineralogical trip through what is now Missouri and Arkansas, and in 1820 he was the topographer on an expedition through the upper Mississippi River and Lake Superior regions. After publishing an 1821 book on his travels, Schoolcraft was appointed in 1822 as US Indian agent at Sault Ste. Marie. There, Schoolcraft accepted an invitation from John Johnston to stay at his house. In 1823, Schoolcraft married Jane Johnston Schoolcraft, daughter of Johnston and his wife Ozhaguscodaywayquay, herself the daughter of Ojibwe war chief Waubojeeg, After their marriage, the couple continued to live in the Johnston house. The Schoolcrafts had four children: William (1824), who died young, a stillborn daughter in 1825, Janee in 1826 and John in 1829.

Henry Schoolcraft remained an Indian Agent at Sault Ste. Marie and (in 1833) Mackinac Island, and became superintendent of Indian affairs in 1836. In 1841, he resigned his commission and moved to New York City. Perhaps due to the death of their first two children, Henry and Jane grew estranged, and Jane died soon after Henry's resignation in 1841. Schoolcraft wrote further about Indian culture, and died on Dec. 10, 1864 in Washington, D.C.

== Schoolcraft House History ==
After being appointed to his position in Sault Ste. Marie, Schoolcraft requested the construction of a suitable building to house the agency. Schoolcraft designated a site, and plans were drawn up by Obed Wait, who had earlier designed Michigan's territorial capitol located in Detroit. Construction began in 1826 and was completed in 1827. The building, dubbed "Elmwood" due to the surrounding elms, was the headquarters for Indian affairs throughout the upper Great Lakes, as well as the home of the Schoolcrafts, from its construction until 1833, when the agency headquarters was relocated to Mackinac Island. The building was still used by the agency through the 1830s and 1840s.

In 1853, the government leased Elmwood to Charles T. Harvey, who supervised the construction of the first Soo Locks while living in the house. Sault Ste. Marie merchant and businessman Peter Barbeau purchased the building in 1874 when the government sold it. Around the 1880s, substantial Queen Anne-style alterations were done to the building, diminishing the "classical elegance" of the original design. Around 1900, the building, along with a swath of the surrounding shoreline, was sold to the Michigan Lake Superior Power Company. It was used as an office building, then lay vacant for decades while owned by Union Carbide. It was used in the 1950s and 1960s to display the collection of the Chippewa County Historical Society.

In 1979, Elmwood was moved from its original location at 705 East Portage Avenue to its current location at 435 East Water Street, next to the John Johnston House. At the same time, the building was restored to its original footprint, in particular removing the extensive 1880s additions. It is planned to reconstruct the original Federal-style appearance of the structure. The west wing, that originally housed the Indian Affairs Agency, is open to the public.

== Description ==
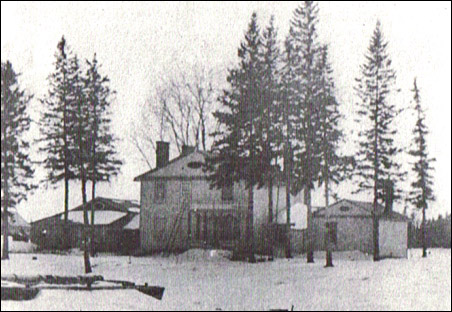
Elmwood before the 1880s remodel.

The original section of Elmwood was a Federal style building, with a two-story central section and single-story wings on each side connected to the central section via breezeways. The entire structure was nearly 100 feet (30 m) long, with a veranda running the full length. The interior had 15 rooms.

The building was originally situated directly on the banks of the St. Marys River, within a grove of maples, mountain ash, and elms (from which it took its name).
