= John Johnston House (Sault Ste. Marie, Michigan) =

Historic house in Michigan, United States

- U.S. National Register of Historic Places
- Michigan State Historic Site
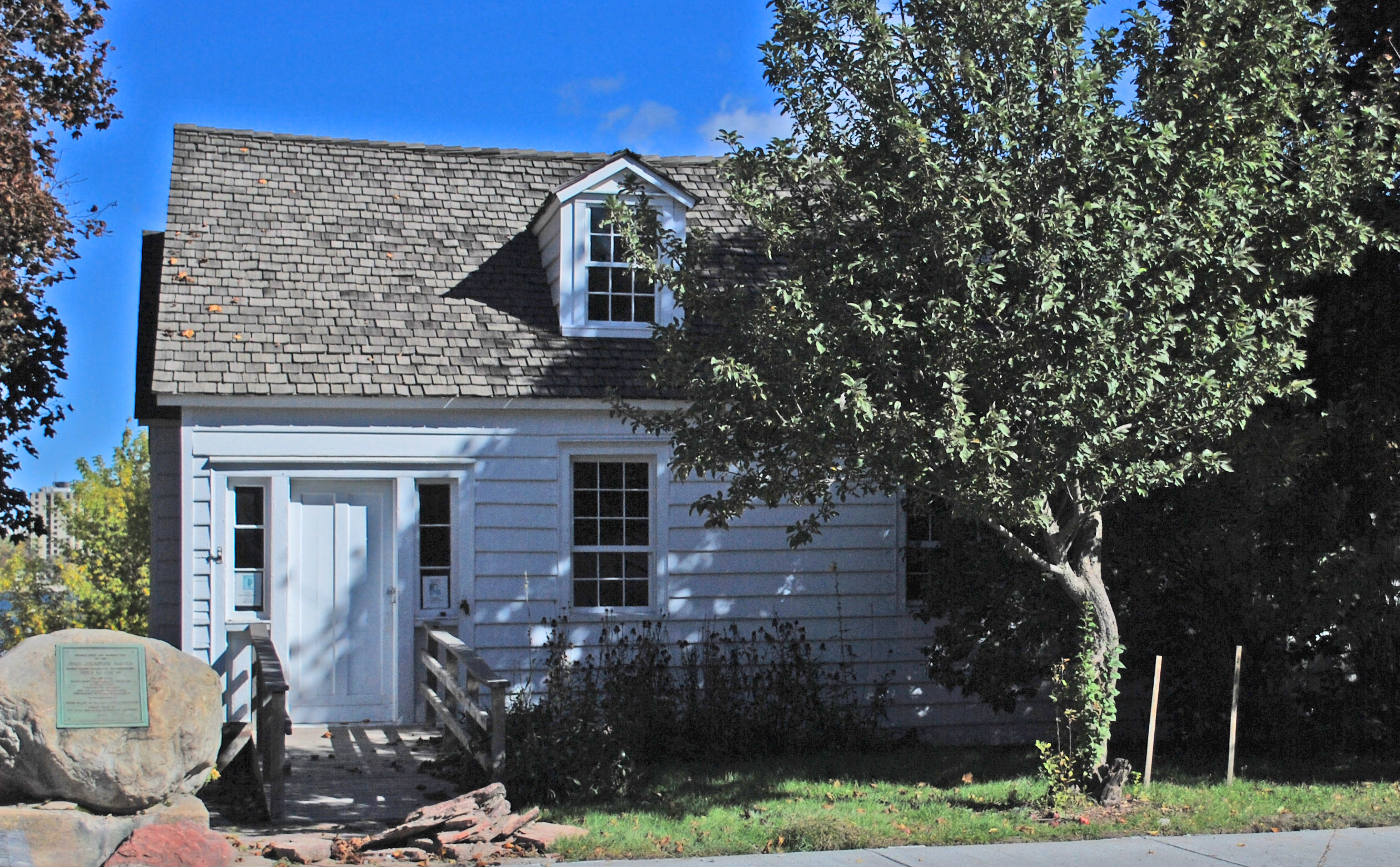

- Location within Michigan Location within the United States
- Interactive map
- Location: 415 Water Street; Sault Ste. Marie, Michigan
- Coordinates: 46°29′57″N 84°20′19″W
- Area: 0.1 acres (0.040 ha)
- Built: 1822
- Architects: Mayer & Savoie (c. 1949 restoration)
- NRHP reference No.: 70000268

Significant dates
- Added to NRHP: July 8, 1970
- Designated MSHS: February 19, 1958

The John Johnston House is a historic house museum located at 415 Water Street in Sault Ste. Marie, Michigan. Owned by the City of Sault Ste. Marie, it is part of the Historic Water Street Museums, a collection of preserved historic buildings interpreting the area's early history. The house was listed on the National Register of Historic Places in 1970 and designated a Michigan State Historic Site in 1958.

== John Johnston ==
John Johnston (1762–1828) was born on August 25, 1762, in Northern Ireland, the son of William Johnston and Elizabeth McNeil, well-to-do landowners. In 1790, he relocated to what is now Canada and became affiliated with the North West Company, a fur trading company headquartered in Montreal, Quebec. In 1791, Johnston embarked on a trading trip to Mackinac Island, and continued on himself, establishing a trading post on the Bad River near what is now Ashland, Wisconsin and befriending the local Ojibwe. At the end of the season, Johnston took his furs to Montreal, but in 1792 returned to the Bad River area and married Ozhaguscodaywayquay, the daughter of Ojibwe war chief Waubojeeg. In 1793, Johnston and his wife settled in the Sault to trade with the native residents there. The couple had four sons and four daughters, including Jane Johnston Schoolcraft, who married notable author, explorer, and Native American culture expert Henry Rowe Schoolcraft.

John Johnston was Justice of the Peace in Sault Ste Marie for many years. He remained in Sault Ste. Marie for the rest of his life, remaining in the fur trade. In 1812, Johnston helped British troops take control of Fort Mackinac on Mackinac Island. In 1814, American forces burned his house, as well as $40,000 of his goods, in retaliation. However, Johnston rebuilt, in part by selling his parents' estate in Ireland, and became connected with John Jacob Astor's American Fur Company. John Johnston died on September 22, 1828.

== History of the John Johnston House ==
In 1794, John Johnston constructed a house on this site. That house was destroyed in 1814 by American forces in retaliation for Johnston's aid to the British in the War of 1812. Johnston rebuilt the house in 1815.

In 1822, Henry Rowe Schoolcraft was appointed US Indian agent at Sault Ste. Marie. Schoolcraft married John Johnston's eldest daughter Jane in 1822, and Johnston built a substantial addition to the 1815 structure for them to live in. This addition comprises the whole of the current Johnston House. The Schoolcrafts lived in this house until 1827, when they moved to Elmwood, the Indian Agency headquarters in the Sault.

Colonel Eben S. Wheeler lived in the house from 1883 to 1900; Wheeler added the dormer windows and made further architectural changes. In 1910, a tree fell on the house, demolishing the original 1815 section. The Great Lakes Towing Company purchased the house shortly thereafter. In 1949, they gave the house to the city of Sault Ste Marie, and it was restored by architects Mayer and Savoie.

Thou house is currently used as an architecture and construction exhibit of the common look of houses of the period. In the 1980s, three other historic structures were moved to a location near the Johnston House, including Henry Rowe Schoolcraft's Elmwood.

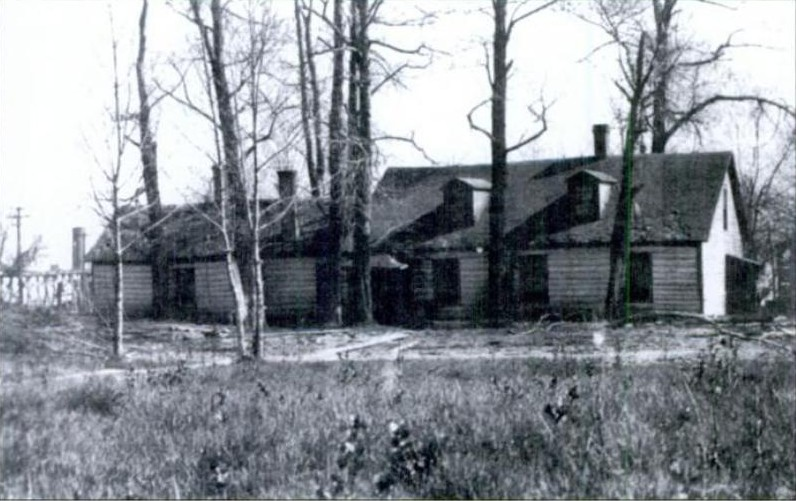
John Johnston House in 1909, showing both 1815 section and 1822 addition

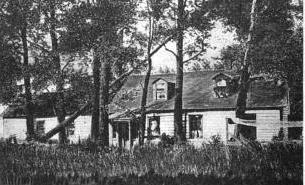
Johnston House, 1910. Note fallen tree.

== Description ==
The John Johnston House is a rectangular, 1 1/2-story house, constructed of cedar logs and covered with clapboards. Two gabled dormers are in the roof. The first floor contains five rooms and a central hall.

An early description of the house, written before the destruction of the 1815 section of the Johnston house, said:

The house was one of the finest in the North at the time it was built. Someone has described it as a long, low, well-built log house in a beautiful old-fashioned garden, where roses, lilacs, sweet williams, bachelor buttons, marigolds, and other flowers grew luxuriantly. When Johnston lived there, the great sideboard in the dining room was lipped with many pieces of solid silver brought from his ancestral home in Ireland; while the portraits, massive-framed, upon the walls, and the many foreign articles about the rooms, aroused great wonder and admiration...
