= Lake Windigo =

Lake in the state of Minnesota, United States

- Location within Minnesota Location within the United States
- Location: on Star Island in Cass Lake, Leech Lake Indian Reservation, Cass County, MN
- Coordinates: 47°25′07″N 94°34′13″W
- Basin countries: United States
- Surface area: 199 acres (81 ha)
- Max. depth: 25 ft (7.6 m)
- Surface elevation: 1,302 ft (397 m)

Lake Windigo is a small lake on Star Island in northern Minnesota, United States. The lake covers a total of 199 acres (81 hectares) and reaches a maximum depth of 25 feet (7.6 m). The littoral zone is 129 acres (52 hectares). Due to its shallow depth and subsequent abundant plant and algae growth, water clarity extends 6 feet (1.8 m). The lake hosts small populations of northern pike and walleye and large communities of panfish. Access to Lake Windigo is by a short portage from Cass Lake on the north side of the island. The lake is best navigated by canoe, rowboat, cabin cruiser, or other small watercraft.

Windigo is located in Star Island in Cass Lake. In the television series Ripley's Believe It Or Not, the lake was designated as being the only lake within a lake in the Northern Hemisphere. However that is incorrect. There are many other such lakes. One lake, Lake Manitou (at 40 sq. miles), located on Manitoulin Island in Lake Huron (in Canada) is actually the largest lake within a lake on the planet. Lake Windigo is, however, the only spring fed lake within a river fed lake in the northern hemisphere.

Star Island is itself a historical site. The village of Ozaawindib, Schoolcraft's guide to Lake Itasca, was located on the island. The Ojibwe people flourished in the area up until the arrival of American and European settlers. In the early 1900s, parts of the island were sold to private entities, while the majority of the island entered the protection of the federal government as a national forest. It remains this way to this day.

The lake derives its name from the Wendigo or Windigo of Algonquin mythology, a malevolent, cannibalistic spirit that could possess people and inspire cannibalism, particularly during times of famine. Wendigo ceremonies were often performed during times of famine to remind the people to be wary of the Wendigo spirits.
