= Literary Voyager =

U.S. magazine (1826–1827)

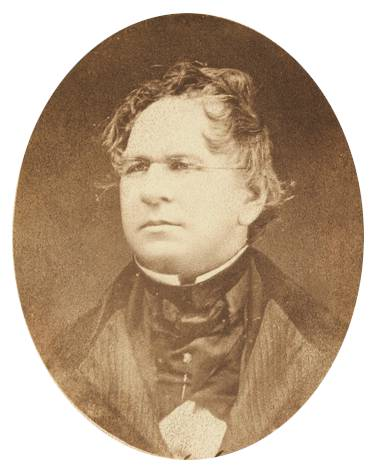
Henry Schoolcraft, the primary author and editor of the Literary Voyager.

The Literary Voyager, also known as The Muzzeniegun (also spelled Muzzinyegun, from Ojibwe mazina'igan ‘book') was a manuscript magazine produced by Henry Rowe Schoolcraft between December 1826 and April 1827, for a total of 16 issues. It is recognized as the first magazine published in Michigan, as well as the first periodical pertaining to Native American culture and mythology. The magazine contained mainly Ojibwe legends and history, as well as poems and stories written by Schoolcraft's wife, Jane Johnston Schoolcraft, an Ojibwe woman who is now recognized as the first Native American literary writer.

== Contents ==
The majority of the articles in the Voyager are anthropological in nature, and were written by Schoolcraft himself. Schoolcraft, an ethnologist who specialized in Native American culture, gathered most of the information necessary for the magazine from visiting Native American informants while he was working as the Indian Agent in Sault Ste. Marie, Michigan. Another significant source of information was Jane Schoolcraft's family, who immersed him in Ojibwe culture and assisted in his learning of the language.

Schoolcraft included Ojibwe folklore and history, as well as biographies of prominent tribe members and essays attempting to ascertain the "character of the Indian mind" and catalog the differences between Native American and Western culture. Frequently, he wrote articles under a pseudonym, such as Abieca, Alalcol, Clio, and Ekiega. The essays published in the Voyager became the basis for his later reports on Native American life, such as his Algic Researches, which compiled northern Native American folktales and histories.

Members of Jane Schoolcraft's family also assisted in writing the magazine. John Johnston, Jane's father, is presumed to have contributed some articles under the pseudonym 'Hibernicus'. In addition, numerous contributions were made by Jane herself, under the pseudonyms 'Rosa' and 'Leelinau'. Both names presented a different facet of Schoolcraft's Native identity. 'Rosa' expressed the more virtuous and dignified side of the Ojibwe, and the poems under this name often referenced the natural world, such as the poem "To Sisters on a Walk in the Garden, After a Shower":

Come, sisters come! the shower's past,

The garden walks are drying fast,

The Sun's bright beams are seen again,

And nought within, can now detain.

'Leelinau', meanwhile, explored Ojibwe traditions and culture more in depth, such as in the folktale 'Moowis', in which a man scorned by his love interest builds a homunculus out of dirt and human feces and brings it to life in order to trick the woman into falling in love with it. Another example is one of Schoolcraft's more well-known stories, 'The Forsaken Brother'. In it, three children agree to their father's dying wish to take care of each other after his death. The two older children eventually forgo the agreement and abandon the youngest sibling, who is adopted by a wolf pack and eventually turns into a wolf.

Many of Schoolcraft's works from the Voyager were later edited and published; Henry Schoolcraft reprinted several of her stories in his Algic Researches, as well as another of his magazines, called Oneota. Her works are also featured in several literary anthologies and have been published as a stand-alone collection.

== Publication history ==
The Literary Voyager was Schoolcraft's second manuscript magazine, preceded by The Cricket, which ran under various names from 1809 to 1818, and followed by The Bow and Arrow, which began in 1833 and ran for an unknown length of time. The Voyager was published weekly between December 1826 and April 1827, the last known issue dated April 28. The magazine had a limited audience, as only a few copies were produced of each issue. It was mainly circulated among Schoolcraft's acquaintances in Sault Ste. Marie, but, over time was sent to Detroit and New York as well.

Schoolcraft planned to publish the entire run of the magazine in book form in the 1850s; however, the project was abandoned, and the manuscripts were not formally published until 1962. This collection, released by the Michigan State University Press, did not include issues 6, 10, and most of 12, as these issues were lost when Schoolcraft's manuscripts were transferred to the Library of Congress.
