= Cass Lake (Minnesota) =

Lake in the state of Minnesota, United States

- Gaa-miskwaawaakokaag (Ojibwe)
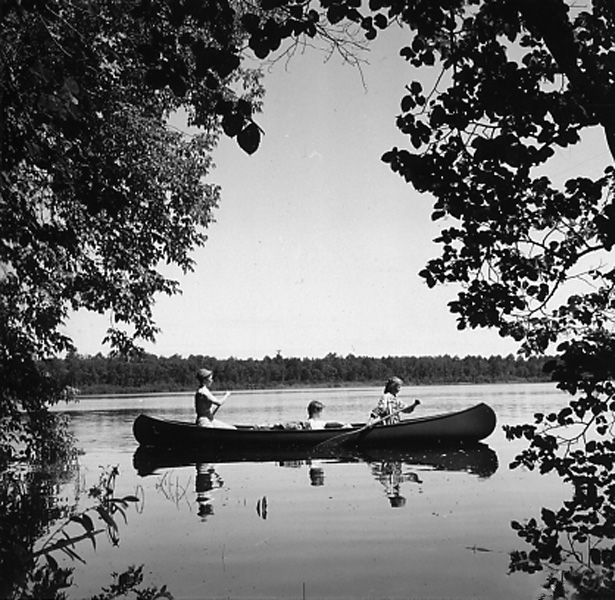
- Canoe Tripping by Girl Scouts of Camp Cassaway on Cass Lake, Minnesota. 1962.

- Location within Minnesota
- Location: Beltrami / Cass counties, Minnesota, United States
- Coordinates: 47.4181°N 94.5392°W
- Primary inflows: Mississippi River / Turtle River / Pike Bay
- Primary outflows: Mississippi River
- Basin countries: United States
- Surface area: 15,958 acres (64.58 km^{2})
- Max. depth: 120 ft (37 m)
- Surface elevation: 1,301 ft (397 m)
- Islands: Star Island, Potato Islands, Cedar Island, unnamed island
- Settlements: Cass Lake

Cass Lake is a lake in north central Minnesota in the United States. It is approximately 10 mi (16 km) long and 7 mi (11 km) wide, located in Cass and Beltrami counties, within the Chippewa National Forest and the Leech Lake Indian Reservation, adjacent to its namesake city of Cass Lake. It is the 11th largest lake in Minnesota, and the 8th largest lake lying entirely within the borders of the state.

== Name ==
In the Ojibwe language, the lake is called Gaa-miskwaawaakokaag (where there are many red cedars), and was known to early explorers and traders in French as Lac du Cedre Rouge, and English as Upper Red Cedar Lake.

== Geography ==
The lake occupies a basin that formed over a ground moraine on the lake's west side and glacial outwash on its east side from melting glacial ice of the Wadena and Des Moines Lobes, respectively, during the retreat of the Laurentide Ice Sheet after the Last Glacial Maximum. The Mississippi River flows through the lake from west to east. A second major stream, the Turtle River, enters the lake from the north. The lake has a large littoral area, particularly around Cedar Island.

Historically, Cass Lake was considered to be much larger. Pike Bay is a 4,760 acres (19.3 km^{2}) lake lying to the south of Cass Lake; the two lakes are connected by a narrow 0.5 mi (0.80 km) long channel. Formerly, the two lakes were connected by a 0.6 mi (0.97 km) wide shallow narrows. Beginning in 1898, construction of a railroad, and later highway and pipeline, across the narrows led to decreased currents through and increased sedimentation in the narrows. The two bodies of water are now generally considered separate lakes, although Pike Bay retains its old name.

The lake contains five islands, including Star Island, Cedar Island, the two Potato Islands, and a small unnamed island. Star Island is notable in that it contains the 199 acres (0.81 km^{2})-sized Lake Windigo, thus forming "a lake within an island within a lake".

The Mississippi River leaves Cass Lake in the northeastern corner, flowing next into Lake Winnibigoshish. Lake level was maintained and stabilized by Knutson Dam beginning in 1924. Knutson Dam was built to replace earlier brush and log dams built by lumber companies. In 2015, Knutson Dam was removed and replaced with a rock weir. This allows a natural setting for water flowing downstream from Cass Lake, accommodates higher flow rates and allows fish migration between lakes connected by the Mississippi.

== History ==
The first recorded visits to the lake by Canadian fur traders were in the 1790s. Mapmaker David Thompson passed through the lake in the spring of 1798 while in the employ of the North West Company. He made the first designation of the location of the headwaters of the Mississippi River, naming Turtle Lake, located upstream of Cass Lake, as the source. This was a matter of great geopolitical importance, as the location of the headwaters was key to mapping the boundary between Canada (British North America) and the United States agreed to in the Treaty of Paris. Thompson's visit was followed by that of Zebulon Pike in February 1806 as a part of a military expedition to explore the northern boundary of the Louisiana Purchase. Pike designated Cass Lake as the 'upper source' and nearby Leech Lake as the 'lower source' of the river.

In July 1820, an expedition led by General Lewis Cass visited the lake. They were prevented from traveling further upstream by low water, and so designated the lake as the headwaters of the Mississippi because below this point, the river is navigable throughout the ice-free season. In June 1832, Henry Schoolcraft, who had been a member of the 1820 expedition, designated the source of the river as being further upstream at Lake Itasca, the source of the perennial stream. Subsequent to the Cass Expedition of 1820, Schoolcraft renamed the lake Cass Lake in honor of the expedition's leader and to distinguish it from Red Cedar Lake (known today as Cedar Lake) in Aitkin County.

Formerly, the lake played an important role in the lumber industry. Log booms were towed across the lake by steamboat from surrounding lakes and streams to either be sawed into lumber at local mills or transported elsewhere by railroad.

== Recreation ==
The lake is popular destination for recreational fishing, boating, and swimming. The lake is known for its walleye, northern pike, muskellunge, and yellow perch fisheries. Tullibee are important forage fish. There are numerous campgrounds and resorts located on its shores. The southern and eastern shores of the lake, as well as all the islands, are protected within the Ten Section Area of the Chippewa National Forest. Norway Beach recreation area is located at the southeast corner of the lake and contains Norway Beach Lodge, a notable example of Civilian Conservation Corps-built Finnish-style log architecture. The city of Cass Lake sits near the southwestern side of the lake.

On the isthmus between Cass Lake and neighboring Buck Lake lies Camp Chippewa, a boys camp founded in 1935 by Otto John Endres. Camp Chippewa is a non-profit, private camp for boys between the ages of 8 and 17. Camp Chippewa is renowned for its tripping program. The camp outfits multi week wilderness canoe trips in Minnesota, Ontario, Manitoba, Saskatchewan and Alberta. The trips vary in length from overnight trips for the youngest campers, to 21 days for the oldest. The in-camp program allows campers to choose their own activities, including archery, riflery, swimming, sailing, canoeing, tennis, fencing, climbing, kayaking, water skiing and soccer. In the Summer of 2019 Camp Chippewa had finally purchased a plot of land on Star Island. Camp Chippewa is directed by Michael and Mary Endres. Another camp, UniStar, lies on a portion of Star Island.

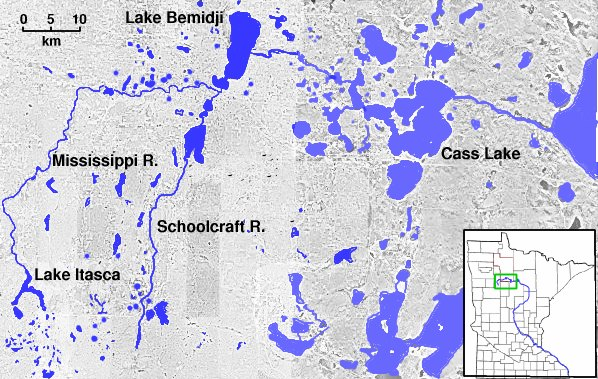
Cass Lake, shown in the watershed of the upper Mississippi River

== See also ==
- Schoolcraft River
- Lake Bemidji
- List of Minnesota lakes
