= 1860 in literature =

This article contains information about the literary events and publications of 1860.

== Events ==
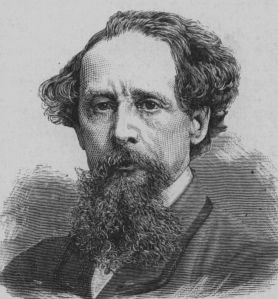
Charles Dickens, c. 1860

- January
  - The first issue of the Cornhill Magazine appears in London. It serializes Anthony Trollope's Framley Parsonage throughout the year.
  - Mrs. Henry Wood's "sensation novel" East Lynne begins serialization in The New Monthly Magazine. Her first full-length novel, Danesbury House, also appears this year.
  - Approximate date – The Catholic newspaper L'Univers is suppressed by the French government.
- January 28 – The first of Charles Dickens' literary sketches generally titled The Uncommercial Traveller appears in his magazine All the Year Round.
- February – Mary Elizabeth Braddon gives up her acting career to write. In the same year she meets her future husband John Maxwell.
- March 27 – The Irish melodrama The Colleen Bawn, or The Brides of Garryowen, written by and starring Dion Boucicault, is first performed at Miss Laura Keene's theatre, New York.
- April 4 – George Eliot's novel The Mill on the Floss is published by John Blackwood in three volumes.
- June 9 – Ann S. Stephens' Malaeska: The Indian Wife of the White Hunter, a tale of the American frontier, becomes the first Beadle's dime novel, published in cheap paperback book format by Irwin P. Beadle & Co. in New York City.
- June 30 – In the 1860 Oxford evolution debate, Samuel Wilberforce and Thomas Huxley debate the theories of Charles Darwin at the Oxford University Museum of Natural History. Lewis Carroll is among the audience.
- August 25 – Wilkie Collins' sensation novel The Woman in White, an early example of mystery fiction, completes its serialization in All the Year Round. It appears in book form in London around August 15.
- c. September 3 – Charles Dickens burns most of his private papers at his home in Kent, Gads Hill Place, having taken up regular residence there this year.
- December 1 – Charles Dickens's Bildungsroman Great Expectations begins serialization in All the Year Round.
- unknown dates
  - Alexander Bain is appointed to the chair of logic and English literature at the University of Aberdeen.
  - Vasil Drumev, later Metropolitan Kliment of Tarnovo and Bulgaria's Prime Minister, brings out the first original story in the Bulgarian language, "A Woeful Family" (Nešastna familiya), in the Istanbul journal Bâlgarski knižitsi.
  - Andreas Munch becomes the first person granted a poet's pension by the Parliament of Norway.

== New books ==
=== Fiction ===
- Wilkie Collins – The Woman in White
- Charles Dickens – Great Expectations (serialization begins)
- George Eliot – The Mill on the Floss
- Mrs G. M. Flanders – The Ebony Idol
- The Goncourt brothers (Edmond and Jules de Goncourt) – Charles Demailly
- Nathaniel Hawthorne – The Marble Faun
- Mór Jókai – Poor Rich (Szegény gazdagok)
- George Meredith – Evan Harrington
- Multatuli – Max Havelaar
- Thomas Love Peacock – Gryll Grange (serialization)
- Charles Reade – The Cloister and the Hearth
- Mary Howard Schoolcraft – The Black Gauntlet: A Tale of Plantation Life in South Carolina
- Ann S. Stephens – Malaeska
- Robert Smith Surtees – Plain or Ringlets? (concludes publication)
- Anthony Trollope – Castle Richmond
- Ivan Turgenev – First Love (Russian: Первая любовь, Pervaya ljubov; novella)

=== Drama ===
- Dion Boucicault – The Colleen Bawn
- Louise Granberg – Johan Fredman

=== Poetry ===
- Gul Bakhsh – Kukikatar Puthi (কুকি কাটার পুঁথি)
- Michael Madhusudan Dutt – Tilottama Sambhab Kabya (তিলোত্তমাসম্ভব কাব্য, "Birth of Tilottama")
- Henry Wadsworth Longfellow – "Paul Revere's Ride"
- See also 1860 in poetry

=== Non-fiction ===
- Jacob Burckhardt – The Civilization of the Renaissance in Italy (Die Cultur der Renaissance in Italien)
- Mordecai Cubitt Cooke – The Seven Sisters of Sleep. Popular history of the seven prevailing narcotics of the world
- Ralph Waldo Emerson – The Conduct of Life
- Gray's Anatomy (2nd edition)
- Eliphas Lévi – Histoire de la magie
- Andrei Mocioni (attrib.) – Caus'a limbelor și națiunalităților in Austri'a (The Cause of Languages and Nationalities in Austria)
- Roger Gougenot des Mousseaux – La Magie au dix-neufième siècle (Magic in the Nineteenth Century)
- J. W. Parker (ed.) – Essays and Reviews
- John Ruskin – Modern Painters IV

== Births ==
- January 10 – Charles G. D. Roberts, Canadian poet (died 1943)
- January 29 – Anton Chekhov, Russian short story writer, novelist and dramatist (died 1904)
- February 11 – Rachilde (Marguerite Vallette-Eymery), French author (died 1953)
- April 8 – Catherine Isabella Dodd, English education writer and novelist (died 1932)
- April 9 – Ellen Thorneycroft Fowler, English writer of romances and children's books (died 1929)
- May 9

- J. M. Barrie, Scottish-born novelist and dramatist (died 1937)
- Kate E. Griswold American magazine editor, publisher, and proprietor (died 1923)

- May 28 – Sigrid Pettersson, Swedish poet and translator (died 1926)
- June 1 – Hugh Thomson, Irish-born illustrator (died 1920)
- June 6 – William Inge, English theologian (died 1954)
- July 3 – Charlotte Perkins Gilman, American novelist, short story writer and social reformer (died 1935)
- July 7 – Abraham Cahan, American Jewish journalist and novelist (died 1951)
- July 14 – Owen Wister, American Western fiction writer and historian (died 1938)
- July 18 – Herbert Kelly, English religious writer and cleric (died 1950)
- August 8 – Eliza Putnam Heaton, American journalist and editor (died 1919)
- August 12 – Harriet Theresa Comstock, American children's author (died 1925)
- August 16 – Jane Agnes Stewart, American author, editor, and contributor to periodicals (died 1944)
- August 18 – Kristína Royová, Slovak novelist, religious writer and poet (died 1936)
- September 2 – Georgina Fraser Newhall, Canadian author (died 1932)
- September 13 – Ralph Connor, Canadian novelist (died 1937)
- September 14 – Hamlin Garland, American novelist, poet and essayist (died 1940)
- September 20 – Jennie Thornley Clarke, American educator, writer, and anthologist (died 1924)
- October 6 – Rosamund Marriott Watson, born Rosamund Ball and writing as Graham R. Tomson, English poet (died 1911)
- October 23 – Molly Elliot Seawell, American novelist and dramatist (died 1916)
- December 8 – Amanda McKittrick Ros, born Anna McKittrick, Irish novelist and poet noted for her purple prose (died 1939)
- December 11 – Leonard Huxley, English writer and editor (died 1933)

== Deaths ==
- January 26 – Eliza Lee Cabot Follen, American abolitionist and writer (born 1787)
- January 29 – Ernst Moritz Arndt, German poet (born 1769)
- February 9 – William Evans Burton, English dramatist, theatre manager and publisher (born 1804)
- February 25 – Chauncey Allen Goodrich, American lexicographer (born 1790)
- March 17 – Anna Brownell Jameson, Irish-born essayist, travel writer and editor (born 1794)
- May 9 – Samuel Griswold Goodrich (Peter Parley), American children's author (born 1793)
- May 16 – Anne Isabella Byron, Baroness Byron (Annabella Milbanke), English memoirist and wife of Lord Byron (born 1792)
- May 28 – Rosine de Chabaud-Latour, French religious thinker and translator (born 1792)
- May 23 – Albert Richard Smith, English journalist and humorist (bronchitis, born 1816)
- June 18 – Friedrich Wilhelm von Bismarck, German army officer and writer (born 1783)
- August 25
  - Christian Lobeck, German classicist (born 1781)
  - Johan Ludvig Heiberg, Danish poet and critic (born 1791)
- September 21 – Arthur Schopenhauer, German philosopher (born 1788)
- September 23 – George Godfrey Cunningham, Scottish non-fiction writer, compiler, and translator (born c. 1802)
- October 22 – Wanda Malecka, Polish publisher (born 1800)
- December 2 – Ferdinand Christian Baur, German theologian (born 1792)
- December 8 – Mary Hall Adams, American book editor and letter writer (born 1816)
- December 11 – Anne Knight, English children's writer and educationist (born 1792)

== Awards ==
- Newdigate Prize – John Addington Symonds
