= Schoolcraft State Park =

State park in Minnesota, United States

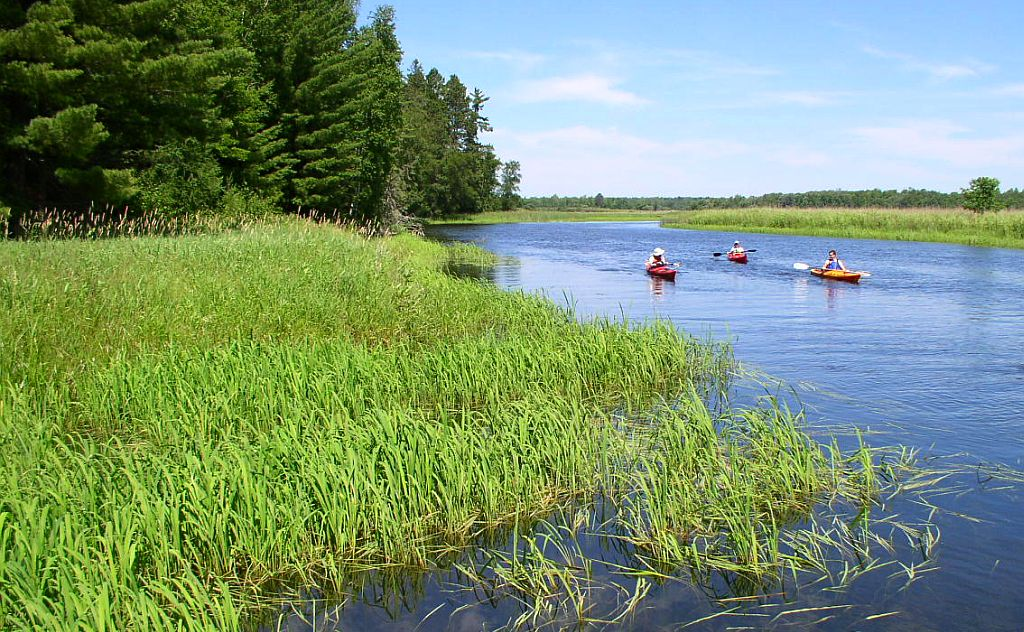
- Kayakers on the Mississippi River in Schoolcraft State Park

- Location within Minnesota Location within the United States
- Location: Minnesota, United States
- Coordinates: 47°13′29″N 93°47′59″W
- Area: 225 acres (91 ha)
- Established: 1959
- Named for: Henry Schoolcraft
- Governing body: Minnesota Department of Natural Resources

Schoolcraft State Park is a state park of Minnesota, USA, on the banks of the Mississippi River near Grand Rapids and Deer River. It was named for the Henry Schoolcraft, who with Anishinaabe guide Ozawindib charted the headwaters of the Mississippi.

== Geology ==
The park lies on glacial outwash and till over the Biwabik Iron Formation. It consists of sorted and stratified rock and mineral debris. Following glaciation, the park was tundra which was later succeeded by spruce and tamarack.

== History ==
Schoolcraft camped in the area that is now Schoolcraft State Park on his trip to the headwaters of the Mississippi.

The field at the southern end of the township is the site of the first recorded homestead in Torrey Township. It was a well-known stopping place for early lumberjacks on the rivers, as the mouth of the Vermillion River was a common place for wanigans to be tied. Beginning in the 1880s, Schoolcraft was logged of red and white pine, and aspen and birch became the dominant forest cover. The park includes a white pine that is more than 300 years old.

The park was established in 1959 and is fully state owned.

== Biology and ecology ==
The dominant forest cover is red and white pine, aspen, and birch. About one third of the park is pine. The park is a balance of hardwood and lowland species including maple, basswood, iron wood, oak, ash, spruce, tamarack, and alder.

Plant communities and water resources provide habitat for wildlife diversity. Species of birds include the bald eagle, great horned owl, sharp shinned hawk, Cooper's hawk, saw whet owl, goshawk, eastern wood pewee, alder flycatcher, gray jay and black-backed woodpecker. Waterfowl include mallards, wood ducks, ring-necked ducks and occasional black ducks.

Most northern Minnesota mammals are in the park including white-tailed deer, black bear, raccoon, beaver, snowshoe hare, red fox, red and gray squirrels, mink and river otter. Fish include northern pike, walleye, largemouth and smallmouth bass, muskellunge, and crappies in the Mississippi river.

== Recreation ==
Recreation includes hiking, boating, fishing, and camping. The park includes 28 rustic drive-in sites and a group camp. There are two miles of hiking with interpretive signs. Picnic tables and grills are available. There is boat access to the Mississippi River.
