= SS Henry R. Schoolcraft =

World War II Liberty ship of the United States

History

United States
- Name: Henry R. Schoolcraft
- Namesake: Henry R. Schoolcraft
- Builder: Richmond Shipyards, Richmond, California
- Yard number: 2132
- Way number: 1
- Laid down: 11 December 1943
- Launched: 30 December 1943
- Fate: Sold, 1947; Wrecked and scrapped, 1967

General characteristics
- Type: Liberty ship
- Tonnage: 7,000 long tons deadweight (DWT)
- Length: 441 ft 6 in (134.57 m)
- Beam: 56 ft 11 in (17.35 m)
- Draft: 27 ft 9 in (8.46 m)
- Propulsion: Two oil-fired boilers; Triple expansion steam engine; Single screw; 2,500 hp (1,864 kW)
- Speed: 11 knots (20 km/h; 13 mph)
- Capacity: 9,140 tons cargo
- Complement: 41
- Armament: 1 × Stern-mounted 4 in (100 mm) deck gun; AA guns

SS Henry R. Schoolcraft (MC contract 2132) was a Liberty ship built in the United States during World War II.

Named after Henry R. Schoolcraft, an American geographer, geologist, and ethnologist, the ship was laid down by Permanente Metals in their Richmond Yard #1 on 11 December 1943, then launched on 30 December 1943. The vessel was operated by Seas Shipping Company under a USAT (United States Army Transport) identification, meaning that it was under the control of the Army Transportation Service. In 1947, the ship was sold into private ownership. However, in 1967, the ship was wrecked and subsequently scrapped.
