= Lake Plantagenet =

Lake in the state of Minnesota, United States

Coordinates: 47.3946°N 94.925°W

- Ozaawindibe-zaaga'igan (Ojibwe)
- Location within Minnesota Location within the United States
- Location: Hubbard County, Minnesota
- Type: Natural freshwater lake
- Basin countries: United States
- Max. length: 3.08 mi (4.96 km)
- Max. width: 1.66 mi (2.67 km)
- Surface area: 2,530 acres (1,020 ha)
- Max. depth: 65 ft (20 m)
- Surface elevation: 1,342 ft (409 m)

Lake Plantagenet is a lake in the U.S. state of Minnesota.

The name of the lake commemorates the House of Plantagenet. Its name in the Ojibwe language is Ozaawindibe-zaaga'igan (Yellow-head Lake), named after Ozaawindib, an Ojibwe who guided Henry Schoolcraft to the nearby Omashkoozo-zaaga'igan (Elk Lake), renamed by Schoolcraft Lake Itasca.

== See also ==
- List of lakes in Minnesota
