= Knutson Dam =

Dam in Minnesota, U.S.

- Interactive map of Knutson Dam
- Location: Beltrami County, Minnesota within the Chippewa National Forest
- Coordinates: 47°27′06″N 94°29′00″W
- Opening date: 1928
- Demolition date: 2015
- Operator: United States Forest Service

Dam and spillways
- Impounds: Upper Mississippi River
- Height: 9 ft.

Reservoir
- Creates: Cass Lake
- Surface area: 15,958 acres

Knutson Dam was a dam located along the Upper Mississippi River within the Chippewa National Forest and was originally built in 1890s as a logging dam. In 1928 it was rebuilt by the U.S. Army Corps of Engineers and management of the dam was given to the U.S. Forest Service.

The dam was removed and replaced with rock arch rapids in 2015.
