= John Johnston (fur trader) =

British fur trader (1762–1828)

- Born: 1762; Belfast, Ireland
- Died: 1828 (aged 65–66)
- Occupations: Frontiersman, fur trader, Justice of the Peace.
- Employer: North West Company
- Spouse: Ozhaguscodaywayquay (Woman of the Green Glade / Susan Johnston)

John Johnston (1762–1828) was a wealthy and successful British fur trader for the North West Company. He operated a trading post at what is now Sault Ste. Marie, Michigan when it was still Canadian territory before the War of 1812. After the border became redefined, Johnston was a prominent citizen and leader in the Michigan Territory of the United States, although he never became a US citizen.

He had married Ozhaguscodaywayquay (Woman of the Green Glade), daughter of Waubojeeg (White Fisher), a prominent Ojibwe war chief and civil leader from what is now northern Wisconsin. The Johnstons were leaders in both the Euro-American and Ojibwa communities. Johnston's life was markedly disrupted by the War of 1812, as afterward the U.S. prohibited trading by Canadians in its territory.

== Early life fur trade ==
Johnston was born in Belfast, Ireland to an upper-class Scots-Irish family. He held in his own right the estate of Craige, near Coleraine in County Londonderry. His father was a civil engineer who planned and built the Belfast Water Works. During John's youth, his mother's brother was Attorney General of Ireland.

As a young man, Johnston emigrated in 1792 to Canada for its opportunities. He had letters of introduction to Lord Dorchester, Governor of the colony. Through him, he met leaders in society, including the magnates of the recently formed North West Company in Montreal, Quebec. The fur trade looked like a good opportunity to make a profit. Johnston planned to be a "wintering partner", one who traded with Native Americans at the frontier post in the interior of the territory. With his own capital, he purchased trade goods in Montreal to take with him.

== Marriage ==
Johnston went to Sault Ste. Marie, a journey which then took several weeks, where he settled on the south side of the river. There Johnston met Ozhaguscodaywayquay (Woman of the Green Glade), daughter of Waubojeeg (White Fisher), a prominent Ojibwe war chief and civil leader from what is now northern Wisconsin. Johnston fell in love with Chief Waubojeeg's daughter, but the Chief was skeptical of white men. He initially refused when Johnston asked for his daughter in marriage, saying:

White Man, I have noticed your behaviour, it has been correct; but, White Man, your colour is deceitful. Of you, may I expect better things? You say you are going to Montreal; go, and if you return I shall be satisfied of your sincerity and will give you my daughter.

The couple married, after which Ozhaguscodaywayquay took and also used the name of Susan Johnston.

Like Johnston, most fur traders were Europeans of social standing and, together with the upper-class Ojibwa women they married, they formed the upper tier of a two-class frontier society. "Kinship and ties of affinity proved more than merely useful to the traders. They were both a source of power and a necessity if one was to achieve success in the trade." Johnston was considered the first permanent European-American settler in Sault Ste. Marie.

The Johnstons' cedar log house on Water Street in Sault Ste. Marie was built in 1796 in a French colonial style. When their eldest daughter Jane married Henry Schoolcraft, the US Indian agent, the Johnstons built an addition for them to live in. Some years later, the Schoolcrafts built their own house in the village. The addition is now the only remaining part of the Johnston house, and it is one of the featured historic houses in the city. Jane Johnston Schoolcraft has been recognized as the first Native American woman poet.

Although the south side of the river became United States territory in 1797 after treaty settlements following the end of the American Revolutionary War, Johnston never became a US citizen. At the time, the border was a fluid area. In those years, Native Americans had separate status and were generally not considered United States citizens. For the people at Sault Ste. Marie after 1797, there was little change in their daily lives or relations with the Ojibwa, except as they received more American explorers.

== Career ==
As a young man, Johnston was thrilled at the opportunity he saw with the North West Company. He was impressed by the partners he met and their refined lives. When formed in 1787, the company had 23 partners and 2000 employees: "Agents, factors, clerks, guides, interpreters, and voyageurs."

Over the years Johnston became successful himself, with his fur trading and relations with the Ojibwa enhanced by his wife Susan's family ties to the Ojibwa community. The Johnstons were known as a refined and cultured family, leaders in both the Ojibwa and Euro-American communities, and they maintained a wide range of relations.

As part of their culture of building relationships, the Johnstons welcomed to their home an array of significant players in the region, including surveyors, explorers, traders, governmental officials, trappers, and political leaders. With his wife and her family's help, Johnston developed a broad knowledge of both the Ojibwa ways and the Great Lakes region. He played an integral role in developing the Michigan frontier and was appointed a Justice of the Peace.

Sault Ste. Marie was a community with a mix of fur traders, most of whom had Native American wives; Ojibwa natives, some of high status; and workers who were Métis, European, and Native American. Permanent and temporary structures included warehouses for furs, scattered housing and Indian wigwams, and sheds for boats. Many of the Ojibwa stayed in the area for the fishing more than for the settlement.

Increasing economic tensions between Great Britain and the US affected the fur trade. In 1806 US changes to the Jay Treaty of 1794 restricted British fur traders to operating in Canada. Both they and the Ojibwa wished to return to the previous arrangement, which allowed free passage across the border for trade by nationals of both countries and by the Indians.

During the War of 1812, Johnston assisted the British, due to his longstanding affiliations with them. After a direct appeal from the garrison at Michilimackinac, Johnston supplied about 100 of his men and took two batteaux for their relief in 1814. When an American force failed to intercept him, it continued to Sault Ste. Marie. There the US raiders burned the North West Company warehouses on both sides of the St. Mary's River, causing substantial losses to Johnston and the Company. The troops also raided his house, called Johnson Hall. They looted the library and furnishings and burned the house down. (Johnston's wife and children fled into the woods when the soldiers arrived.) Johnston never became a U.S. citizen.

The Johnstons' oldest son Louis (also appears as Lewis) was a lieutenant in the British Navy and served on the Queen Charlotte during the War of 1812. He was captured by Commodore Oliver Perry during the battle on Lake Erie. His treatment by the Americans while he was held prisoner at Cincinnati, Ohio turned him against living under their rule.

After the war, Johnston made a direct appeal to Governor Lewis Cass of Michigan to have the restriction against his trading in the interior lifted because of his other services to the region, but to no avail. He suffered financially from his losses and reduced trading and was never able to rebuild his former wealth. Although he applied to the British government for compensation for his losses, no payment was made. Believing he was too old to remove to Canada, he stayed in Sault Ste. Marie south of the river. In 1821 Johnston served as a Commissioner during negotiations to end the rivalry between the North West and Hudson's Bay companies and helped achieve their merger.

Still worried about potential British agitation of Native Americans along the border, in 1822 the US government built and staffed Fort Brady at Sault Ste. Marie. With the fort and troops, other American settlers started to come into the area in greater number. The culture of Sault Ste. Marie changed markedly. Johnston and others who had earlier formed and dominated the community were passed by as the newcomers banded together. The presence of military troops formalized the role of government. The new American residents were reluctant to become involved with the French, Ojibwe, or Métis, and disdained most of the existing society.

== Family ==
The Johnstons had eight children, most of whom were American by the timing of their births in that city. They educated them in English, Ojibwe, and French. Johnston had a large library filled with English classical authors, including poets, which his children used for their literary education. The parents took care to educate their children in both cultures, and expected them to have opportunities in society equivalent to their standing. Many fur traders sent their children to Montreal for formal education.

The Johnstons' eldest daughter Jane married Henry Rowe Schoolcraft, who arrived in Sault Ste. Marie in 1822 as Indian agent for the US government. He was to establish formal relationships with the Native Americans in the region. He became noted as an ethnographer and writer about Native American life. Despite his marriage and interests, he remained more outside Native American life than had fur trader John Johnston.

In 2008 Jane Johnston Schoolcraft was inducted into the Michigan Women's Hall of Fame for her own contributions to literature and history. She is recognized as the first Native American literary writer and poet. A major collection of her work was published in 2007.

The second daughter Eliza never married. The next two married well. The third daughter married Archdeacon MacMurray, of Niagara, who worked as a missionary with tribes along Lake Superior. Maria, the youngest daughter, married James Laurence Schoolcraft, a younger brother of Henry Rowe Schoolcraft.

The Anglo-American settlement and rule over Sault Ste. Marie and Michigan after the War of 1812 changed the culture markedly within a generation. Mixed-race men, even those of upper-class families such as the Johnstons, were discriminated against by the Americans. The Americans disdained the children of mixed marriages; in addition, they were suspicious of Roman Catholics and French speakers. They often did not take the time to discern the layers of northern Michigan society, but lumped all those together who had preceded them in Sault Ste. Marie and other communities.

As noted above, the oldest son, Lewis Johnston, stayed in Canada after the War of 1812. Because of the father John Johnston's resistance to becoming a citizen of the US, his second son George was shut out of the fur trade as the Americans exerted more control in the area. During the 1820s, George Johnston worked for Henry Schoolcraft in various roles for the US Indian Agency, including as interpreter.

After Johnston's death, his widow Susan Johnston and their son William managed the sugaring and fishing business. The youngest son, John McDougall Johnston, settled on Sugar Island (an island along the St. Mary's River) across from Canada. He was later appointed as the last official US Indian Agent in the area.
