= Schoolcraft River =

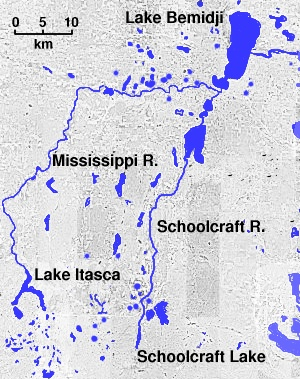
- The Schoolcraft River in the region near the headwaters of the Mississippi.

- Location of mouth in Minnesota

Location
- Country: United States
- State: Minnesota
- Counties: Beltrami, Hubbard

Physical characteristics
- Mouth
  - coordinates: 47°26′36″N 94°53′32″W

Basin features
- River system: Mississippi River

The Schoolcraft River is a tributary of the Mississippi River, approximately 30 mi (48 km) long, in northern Minnesota in the United States. Although short, it is considered as the first major tributary of the Mississippi, since it is the first river that joins the Mississippi below its source that is nearly the same size as the Mississippi itself. The river is named after Henry Schoolcraft, who mapped the region and discovered nearby Lake Itasca as the source of the Mississippi in 1831. Its name in the Ojibwe language is Ozaawindibe-ziibi (Yellow-head River), named after Ozaawindib who guided Schoolcraft to the nearby Omashkoozo-zaaga'igan (Elk Lake), which Schoolcraft then named Lake Itasca. Prior to being named for these early explorers it had been called the "Naiwa River"

It rises in Schoolcraft Lake, in central Hubbard County just south of Lake George. It flows NNE through Paul Bunyan State Forest and through Lake Plantagenet . It joins the Mississippi just south of Bemidji, just before the Mississippi enters Lake Bemidji.

The river is a popular destination for recreational canoeing, and for recreation fishing of walleye.

== See also ==
- List of Minnesota rivers
- List of longest streams of Minnesota
