= Ozaawindib =

19th-century Ojibwa ayaakwe warrior

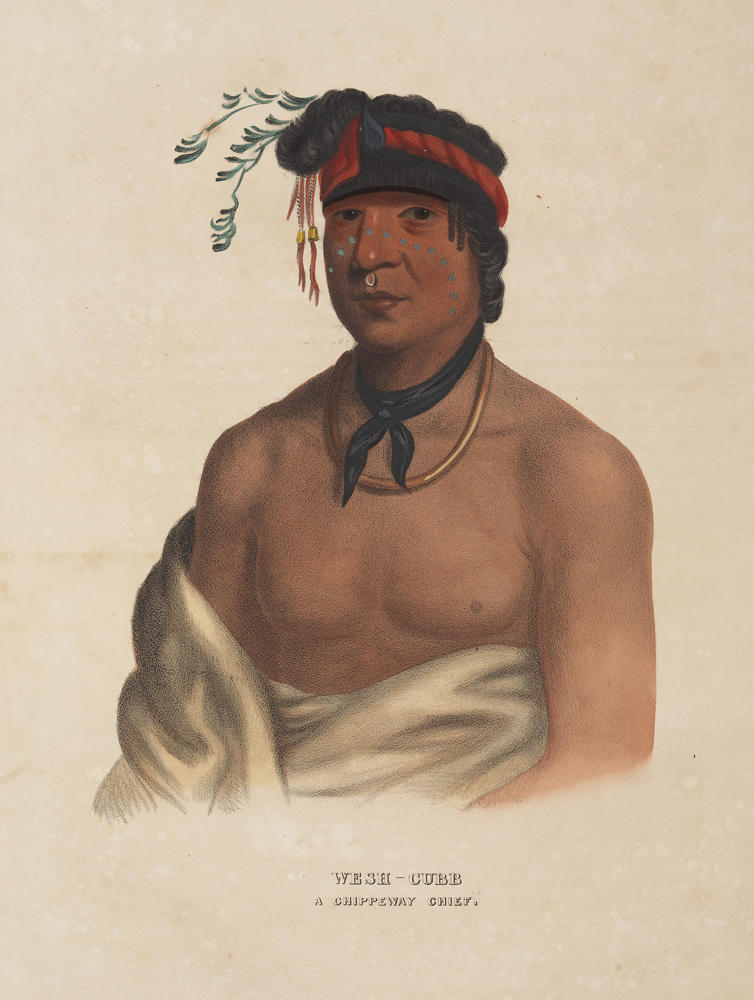
Wiishkobak, Ozaawindib’s brother or father, (Note: Both son and brother of Ozaawindib were named Wiishkobak, and the father was present at Prairie du Chien. However, the portrayed man is thought to look too young for the father of at least fifty year old Ozaawindib, so he is likely to be the younger Wiishkobak or another son of the older Wiishkobak.) in 1825 at Prairie du Chien.

Ozaawindib ("Yellow Head" in English, recorded variously as Oza Windib, O-zaw-wen-dib, O-zaw-wan-dib, Ozawondib, etc.) (Ojibwe) was an early 19th century (fl. 1797–1832) agokwa warrior. Ozaawindib, who was born male, at times wore attire more typically associated with women. (Note: By those who have written about Ozaawindib, who may or may not have been familiar with what was considered gendered attire by the Ojibwe at that time and place.) Ozaawindib had several husbands and was considered in a number of ways to be gender-nonconforming.

== Biography ==
Ozaawindib was likely born in the mid to late seventeen hundreds. Ozaawindib's father was Wiishkobak ("Sweet" or "Le Sucre", recorded as "Wesh-ko-bug"), a chief of the Leech Lake Pillagers. By 1800, the Pillagers, including Ozaawindib, lived on Gaa-Miskwaawaakokaag near Leech Lake - terrain earlier inhabited by the Dakota people, who engaged in warfare with migrating Ojibwe. John Tanner described Ozaawindib status as an aayaakwe in words: "This man was one of those who make themselves women, and are called women by the Indians."

When Tanner encamped on the Red River of the North around 1800, he reports that he was the subject of interest of Ozaawindib, who at that time was about 50 years old and already had several husbands. Tanner reported that after rejecting repeated advances by Ozaawindib, Ozaawindib was still determined to win Tanner's heart. Ozaawindib disappeared for a few days and returned to camp with much-needed fresh meat. However, even after gifting him with meat, Tanner still rejected Ozaawindib. Finally accepting that the courtship had failed, Ozaawindib became the third wife of Chief Wenji-dotaagan. (Note: Wenji-dotaagan (recorded as Wa-ge-to-tah-gun or "That Has a Bell") often he went by Wenji-dot (recorded as "Wa-ge-tote"))

Alexander Henry reported from his Pembina Post in 1797 that when Ozaawindib was drunk, "he was not merely a nuisance but a bothersome man." By 1800, Ozaawindib and Wenji-dotaagan were listed by Henry as part of his crew, with Henry recalling Ozawiindib as having been "the best runner among the Saulteurs [Ojibwe]", famous for a heroic feat during a fight with the Dakota.

In June 1832, Ozaawindib and another Ojibwe from Gaa-Miskwaawaakokaag were traveling to the fort at Sault Ste. Marie to inform the Indian agent, Henry Schoolcraft, about a war party from Leech Lake, departing to pursue the Dakota. They met with Schoolcraft, accompanied by an expedition of men, near Fond du Lac. Schoolcraft convinced Ozaawindib to serve as his guide back to Gaa-Miskwaawaakokaag. Ozaawindib guided Schoolcraft and his men to Gaa-Miskwaawaakokaag and then to Omashkoozo-Zaaga’igan (Elk-Lake), renamed by Schoolcraft to Lake Itasca. After visiting the source of the Mississippi River, the expedition returned to the Ojibwe village on Gaa-Miskwaawaakokaag. On July 16th, 1832, Schoolcraft called a formal council, where he presented Ozaawindib with a medal. According to Schoolcraft, there was no ogimaa (hereditary chief) present in the village, but Ozaawindib was “the principal man in the band.” Schoolcraft did not mention the aayaakwe status or any gender nonconformity from Ozaawindib.

== Legacy ==
Ozaawindib is remembered in place names such as Lake Plantagenet (Ozaawindibe-zaaga'igan) and Schoolcraft River (Ozaawindibe-ziibi) in the Anishinaabe language, and as Yellow Head Point of Lake Itasca in English.

== Bibliography ==
- Catlin, George. (1841) Letters and notes on the Manners, Customs and Condition of the Indians of North America, 1832-39. London: Tosswill and Myers.
- Coues, Elliott, ed. (1897) New Light on the Early History of the Greater Northwest: The Manuscript Journals of Alexander Henry and of David Thompson. New York: Francis P. Harper.
- Gilfillan, J. A. (1893) Manuscripts of Rev. J. A. Gilfillan. St. Paul: Minnesota Historical Society Press.
- James, Edwin, ed. (1830) Captivity of John Tanner. New York.
- Schooolcraft, Henry Rowe. (1834) Narrative of an Expedition Through the Upper Mississippi to Itasca Lake: The Actual Source of This River. New York: Harper & Brothers.
- —————, (1851, reprint 1975) Personal Memoirs Of A Residence Of Thirty Years With The Indian Tribes On The American Frontiers. Philadelphia: Lippincott, Grambo and Co., reprint New York: Arno Press
- Warren, William W. (1885, reprint 1984) History of the Ojibway People. St. Paul: Minnesota Historical Society Press.
