= Turtle Lake (Beltrami County, Minnesota) =

Lake in the state of Minnesota, United States

- Location within Minnesota
- Location: Beltrami County, Minnesota
- Coordinates: 47°37′N 94°52′W
- Type: lake

Turtle Lake is a lake in Beltrami County, Minnesota, in the United States.

The outline of the lake roughly resembles a turtle, hence the name.

The lake’s shape matches the shape of the lake featured in Franklin and the Turtle Lake Treasure.

== See also ==
- List of lakes in Minnesota
