= Mary Howard Schoolcraft =

American author (1820–1878)

Mary Howard Schoolcraft (1820 – March 12, 1878) was an American writer, the author of the controversial pro-slavery novel, The Black Gauntlet: A Tale of Plantation Life in South Carolina. She was the second wife of geographer, geologist and ethnologist Henry Schoolcraft. She lived in Washington, D.C.
