= Roger Gougenot des Mousseaux =

French writer and journalist (1805–1876)

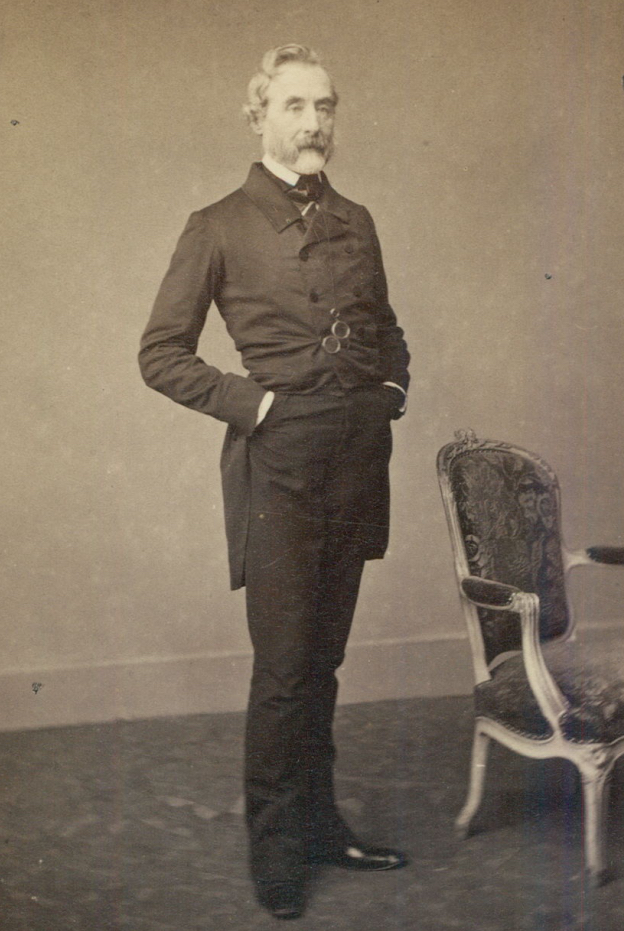
Roger Gougenot des Mousseaux.

Roger Gougenot des Mousseaux (1805–1876) was a French writer, traditionalist Catholic, antisemite and journalist. In 1860 he wrote La magie au dix-neufième siècle, and in 1864 Les hauts phénomènes de la magie.

An ultramontane antisemite, des Mosseaux's Le Juif, le judaïsme et la judaïsation des peuples chrétiens (1869) argued that Jews had manipulated the ideals of the Enlightenment to subvert and destroy Catholic France, and held them responsible for the French Revolution. Gougenot des Mousseaux maintained that Jews engaged in ritual murder and conspired with Freemasons to control the world and that the French Revolution was wrong to grant them equal rights. Pope Pius IX blessed the work and Nazi ideologue Alfred Rosenberg edited and published the first German edition in 1921. It was also heavily cited in Édouard Drumont's popular antisemitic book La France juive.

Gougenot des Mousseaux is a character in Umberto Eco's novel The Prague Cemetery.
