= The Black Gauntlet =

1860 novel by Mary Howard Schoolcraft

The Black Gauntlet: A Tale of Plantation Life in South Carolina
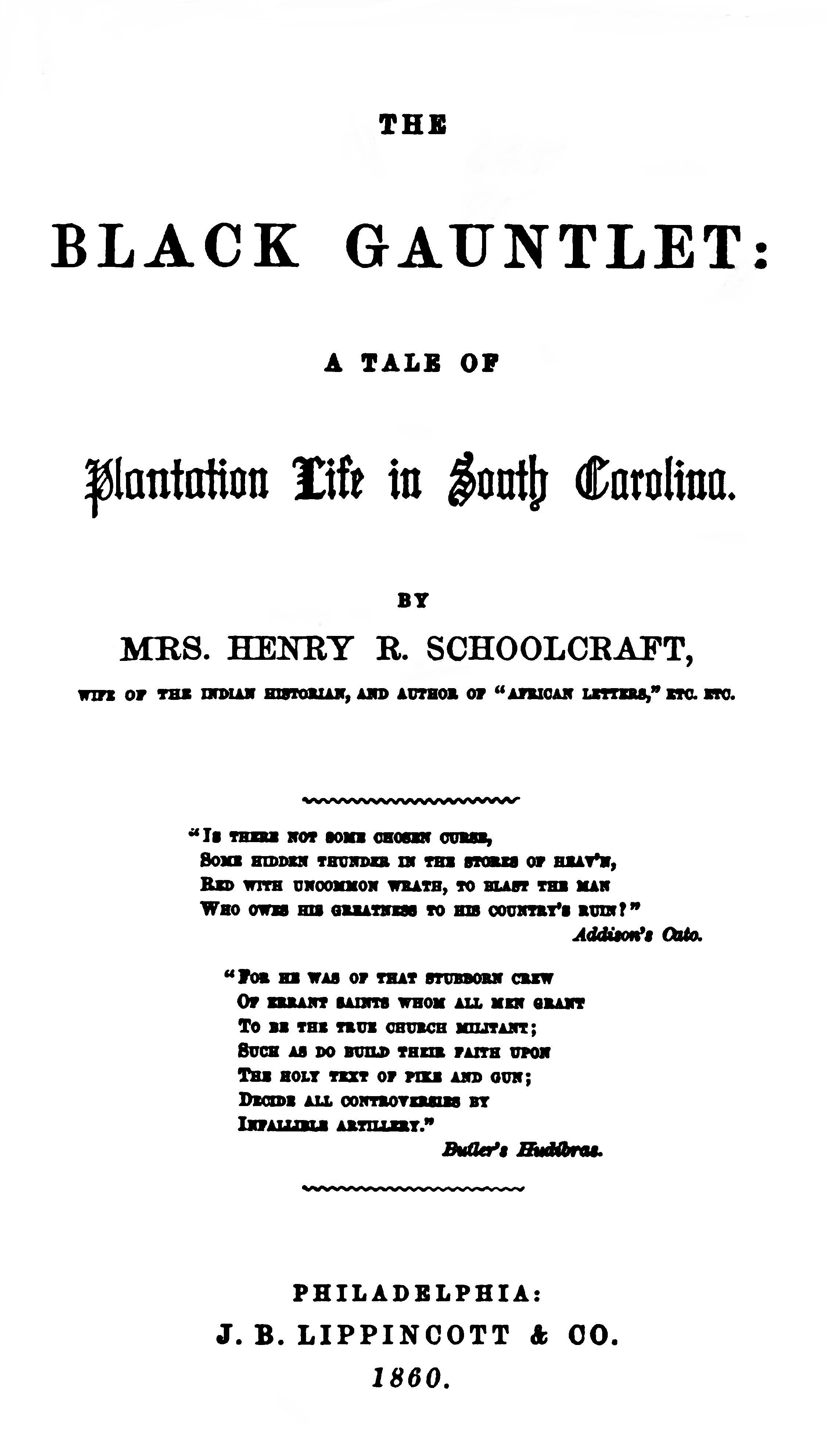
- First edition title page
- Author: Mary Howard Schoolcraft (as Mrs. Henry Rowe Schoolcraft)
- Language: English
- Genre: Plantation literature
- Publication date: 1860
- Publication place: United States

The Black Gauntlet: A Tale of Plantation Life in South Carolina (also known as simply The Black Gauntlet) is an anti-Tom novel written in 1860 by Mary Howard Schoolcraft, published under her married name of Mrs. Henry Rowe Schoolcraft.

== Background ==
Mary Howard (1820–1878) was born into the planter slaveholding elite of South Carolina. She was the second wife of the widower and ethnologist Henry Rowe Schoolcraft, who was 53 when they married in 1846. They lived in Washington, D.C.

The Black Gauntlet is an example of the pro-slavery plantation literature genre that was written in response to the anti-slavery novel Uncle Tom's Cabin (1852) by Harriet Beecher Stowe. Critics accused Stowe of exaggerating and inaccurately depicting Southern society, slaveholders, slaves, and the institution of slavery in the South.

The Black Gauntlet is unusual as a late example, as the majority were written and published soon after Uncle Tom's Cabin in 1852. The competing novels were part of the public, rhetorical arguments between North and South in the years of rising political and social tensions before the American Civil War.

== Plot ==
Unlike other anti-Tom novels, The Black Gauntlet does not have a discernible narrative. It is essentially a collection of speeches by characters who argue for American slavery as an institution. Some of the speeches were created by Schoolcraft. In other cases, she refers to quotations from other published works, including the Bible and Uncle Tom's Cabin.

== In other works ==
Schoolcraft's work used quotes which had also appeared in Aunt Phillis's Cabin (1852) by Mary Henderson Eastman, a native Virginian.
