= Jane Johnston Schoolcraft =

19th century American Indian literary author

- Bamewawagezhikaquay
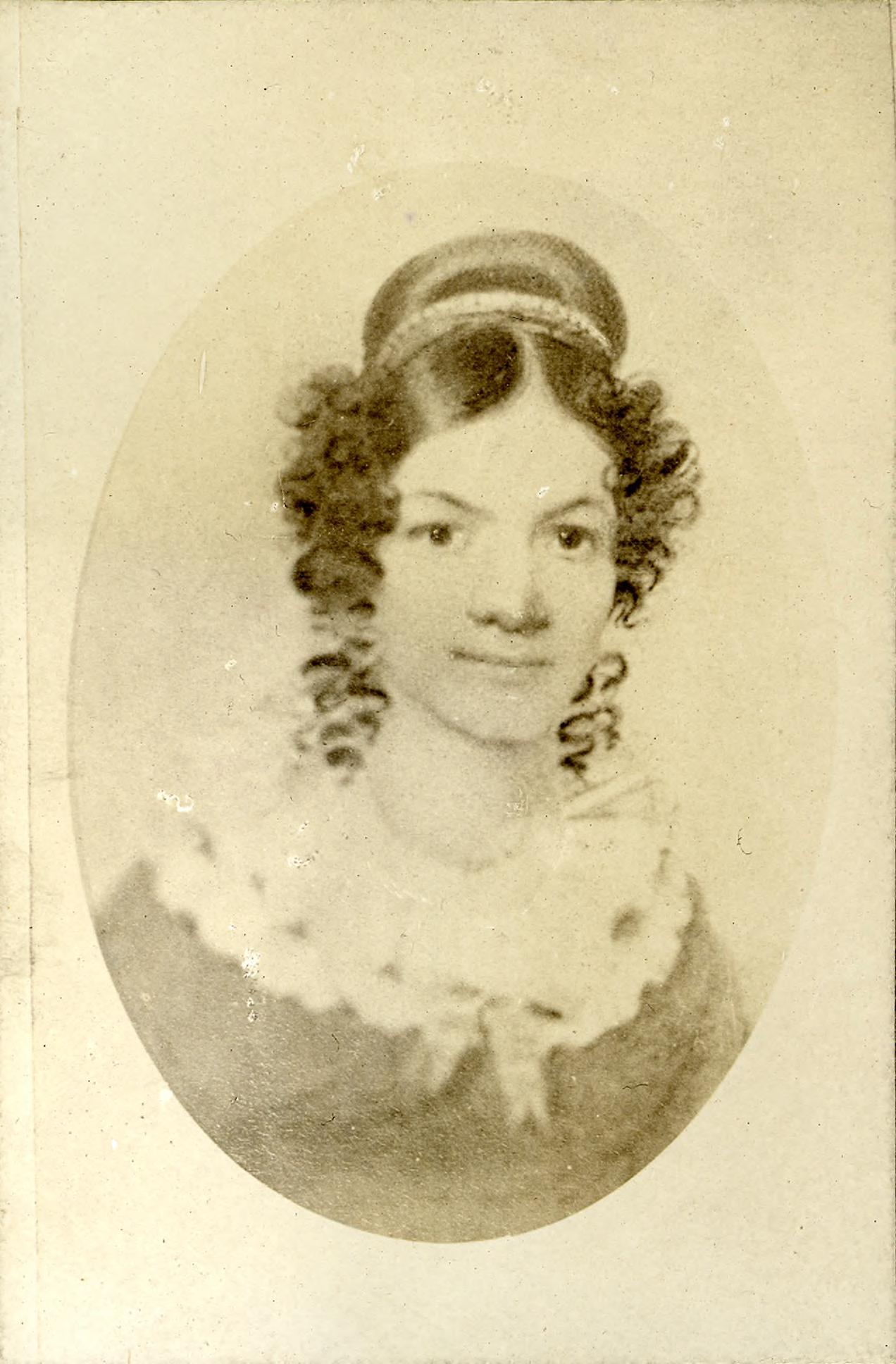
- Born: January 31, 1800; Sault Ste. Marie. Northwest Territory (now Michigan), United States
- Died: May 22, 1842 (aged 42); Ancaster, Upper Canada (now Ontario), British North America (now Canada)
- Resting place: St. John's Anglican Church, Ancaster, Ontario
- Occupation: Author
- Known for: Early American Indian author; wrote in English and Ojibwe
- Spouse: Henry Rowe Schoolcraft
- Children: William Henry Schoolcraft, Jane Susan Ann Schoolcraft, John Johnston Schoolcraft
- Parent(s): Mother, Ozhaguscodaywayquay, father, John Johnston
- Relatives: Grandfather, Waubojeeg

Jane Johnston Schoolcraft, also known as Bamewawagezhikaquay (January 31, 1800 – May 22, 1842) is one of the earliest Native American literary writers. She was of Ojibwe and Scots-Irish ancestry. Her Ojibwe name can also be written as O-bah-bahm-wawa-ge-zhe-go-qua (Obabaamwewe-giizhigokwe in modern spelling), meaning 'Woman of the Sound [that the stars make] Rushing Through the Sky', from babaam- 'place to place, around', -wewe 'S/he(/it) makes a (repeated) sound', giizhig 'sky', and ikwe 'woman'. She lived most of her life in Sault Ste. Marie, Michigan.

== Early life and education ==
Jane Johnston was born in Sault Ste. Marie in the Upper Peninsula of what is now the state of Michigan. Her mother, Ozhaguscodaywayquay, was the daughter of Waubojeeg, a prominent Ojibwe war chief and civil leader from what is now northern Wisconsin, and his wife. Her father John Johnston (1762–1828) was a fur trader who emigrated from Belfast, Ireland, in 1790. The Johnstons are famous historically in the Sault Ste. Marie area, where the couple were prominent leaders in both the Euro-American and the Ojibwe communities. The young Jane learned the Ojibwe language and culture from her mother and her family, and she learned about written literature from her father and his large library.

== Writing ==
Johnston wrote poetry and traditional Ojibwe stories, and she translated Ojibwe songs into English. She mostly wrote in English, but she wrote several poems in the Ojibwe language, as she lived her daily life in both Ojibwe and English. While she did not publish her work, she lived a literary life with her husband Henry Rowe Schoolcraft. They worked together closely on each of their writings. Her poetry was generally concerned with private life.

Jane Schoolcraft's writings have attracted considerable interest from scholars and students, especially those concerned with Native American literature and history. She has been recognized as "the first Native American literary writer, the first known Indian woman writer, the first known Indian poet, the first known poet to write poems in a Native American language and the first known American Indian to write out traditional Indian stories." Her role in the Native American literary canon has been compared to that of Anne Bradstreet in the "broader American literary canon."

== Marriage and family ==
In 1823 Jane married Henry Rowe Schoolcraft, a US Indian agent in the region, who became a founding figure of American cultural anthropology. He was appointed U.S. Indian Agent to Michigan Territory in 1822 and served in the Northwest until 1841.

In 1826 and 1827, Henry Schoolcraft produced a handwritten magazine called The Literary Voyager which included some of Jane's writings. Although he had only single issues, each was distributed widely to residents in Sault Ste. Marie, then to his friends in Detroit, New York and other eastern cities. The Schoolcrafts' letters to each other during periods of separation often included poetry, also expressing how literature was part of their daily lives.

Henry Schoolcraft won fame for his later publications about Native Americans, especially the Ojibwe people and their language. His work was based on information and stories he learned from Jane and the Johnston family, and the access they arranged to other Ojibwe. In 1846, he was commissioned by the United States Congress for what became a six-volume study known as Indian Tribes of the United States. Henry Schoolcraft's publications, including materials written by Jane Schoolcraft, were the main source for Henry Wadsworth Longfellow's The Song of Hiawatha (1855).

They had four children:

- William Henry Schoolcraft (June 1824 – March 1827) died of croup at nearly three. Jane Schoolcraft wrote poems expressing her grief about his loss.
- Stillborn daughter (November 1825);
- Jane Susan Ann Schoolcraft (14 October 1827 – 25 November 1892, Richmond, Virginia), called Janee; and
- John Johnston Schoolcraft (2 October 1829 – 24 April 1864), served in the Civil War but was wounded at the Battle of Gettysburg and disabled. He died at age 34 in Elmira, New York.

Jane and Henry Schoolcraft moved to Mackinac Island in 1833, after he had been given responsibility for a larger territory as Indian agent. Their home has since been demolished, but Henry Schoolcraft's office, also known as the Indian Dormitory, survives. It was used to house Indians who came to the island to acquire promised annuities and supplies.

The Schoolcrafts took Jane and John to a boarding schools on the East coast when they were eleven and nine, respectively, which was hard for John. Schoolcraft wrote a poem in Ojibwe that expressed her feelings of loss after their separation.

In 1841, when Henry lost his patronage position as federal Indian agent due to a change in political administrations, the Schoolcrafts moved to New York City. He worked for the state in American Indian research. Jane Schoolcraft suffered from frequent illnesses; she died in 1842 while visiting a married sister in Canada. She was buried at St. John's Anglican Church in what is now Ancaster, Ontario.

== Legacy and honors ==
- 1932: Jane Johnstone figures as a principal character in the documentary historical novel The Invasion (1932 rpr. 1942) by Janet Lewis.
- 1962: Philip P. Mason published an edition of several issues of The Literary Voyager, with annotation and introduction. He acknowledged Henry Schoolcraft's debt to the John Johnston family for helping with his research and collecting materials. Based on her own works in The Literary Voyager, Jane Schoolcraft's writings gradually began to attract interest in the 1990s, as the work of minorities was more widely studied.
- 2005: "Sweet Willy, My Boy"; lyrics of the song were taken from a poem by Jane Johnston Schoolcraft mourning the death of her first son. From Dave Stanaway and Susan Askwith, CD: John Johnston: His Life and Times in the Fur Trade Era.
- 2007: Robert Dale Parker published The Sound the Stars Make Rushing Through the Sky: The Writings of Jane Johnston Schoolcraft, a complete edition of her extensive writings, based mostly on previously unpublished manuscripts, and including a cultural history and biography. Schoolcraft's writings are now beginning to attract considerable interest from scholars and students of multicultural and American Indian literature and history.
- 2008: Jane Johnston Schoolcraft was inducted into the Michigan Women's Hall of Fame.
