= Ozhaguscodaywayquay =

American Ojibwe woman fur trader (c.1775-1840)

- Born: Ozhaguscodaywayquay c. 1775; Chequameqon (near present day Bayfield, Wisconsin)
- Died: c. 1840; Sault Sainte Marie, Michigan, United States
- Other name: Susan Wau-bo-jeeg "Woman of the Green Glade" "Neengay" (Mother)
- Spouse: John Johnston (married 1792–1840)
- Children: 5
- Parents: Chief Waubojeeg ("White Fisher") (father); Red Sky Morning (Red Dawn Woman, Misquobonoquay) (mother)

Ozhaguscodaywayquay (Ozhaawashkodewekwe: Woman of the Green Glade), also called Susan Johnston (c. 1775 – c. 1840), was an Ojibwe (also known as Ojibwa) woman and was an important figure in the Great Lakes fur trade before the War of 1812, as well as a political figure in Northern Michigan after the war. She married the British fur trader John Johnston, an inland trader of the North West Company. They had prominent roles in the crossroads society of Sault Ste. Marie, Michigan and the territory before 1830, and entertained notable visitors from a variety of disciplines. Their daughter Jane Johnston Schoolcraft has become recognized as the first Native American literary writer in the United States.

== Life ==
She was born as Ozhaguscodaywayquay (Green Prairie Woman) into an Ojibwe family in Chequameqon, near present-day La Pointe, Wisconsin and Chequamegon Bay. Alternative spellings of her name include: Oshawguscodaywayqua, Oshawuscodawaqua, Oshauguscodawaqua, Oshahgushkodanaqua, and Oshawguscodywayquay. Alternative translations include "Daughter of the Green Mountain", "Woman of the Green Valley", "Woman of the Green Prairie", and "Green Meadow Woman". Her father was the war chief Waubojeeg ("The White Fisher"). Waubojeeg had been a war leader when younger, and he became civil chief as an elder in his community at Chequamegon.

Ozhaguscodaywayquay later related to Anna Brownell Jameson in 1836 the story of her vision quest that she had when she was a teenager, in which she fasted in order to find a guardian spirit. According to Jameson's 1838 book Winter Studies and Summer Rambles in Canada, Ozhaguscodaywayquay told her when she was 13, she embarked on her vision quest to find her guardian spirit by fasting alone in a lodge painted black on a high hill. During Ozhaguscodaywayquay's fasting:

"She dreamed continually of a white man, who approached her with a cup in his hand, saying "Poor thing! Why are you punishing yourself? Why do you fast? Here is food for you!" He was always accompanied by a dog, who looked up at her like he knew her. Also, she dreamed of being on a high hill, which was surrounded by water, and from which she beheld many canoes full of Indians, coming to her and paying her homage; after this, she felt as if she was being carried up into the heavens, and as she looked down on the earth, she perceived it was on fire and said to herself, "All my relations will be burned!", but a voice answered and said, "No, they will not be destroyed, they will be saved!", and she knew it was a spirit, because the voice was not human. She fasted for ten days, during which time her grandmother brought her at intervals some water. When satisfied that she had obtained a guardian spirit in the white stranger who haunted her dreams, she returned to her father's lodge".

Jameson also noted that in her youth Ozhaguscodaywayquay "hunted and was accounted the surest eye and fleetest foot among the women of her tribe."

In 1790, Scots-Irish fur trader John Johnston traveled to Mackinac Island and then to Chequamegon by canoe, where he asked Waubjoeeg for permission to marry his youngest daughter, Ozhaguscodaywayquay. Waubojeeg was cautious, as he had seen other white traders later abandon their native wives, and told Johnston to return to Montreal, and if he returned to Chequamegon in the spring, Waubojeeg would consider his proposal. Johnston returned and Waubojeeg agreed to the marriage. Ozhaguscodaywayquay married John Johnston in 1793. However, it appears she was not consulted, as after the marriage she ran off to her grandfather, however her father found her, beat her with a stick, threatened to cut off her ear, and returned her to Johnston. Waubojeeg's motives for his actions are unclear as neither compelled marriage nor violence enforcing it appear typical of Ojibwe marriages or Ojibwe fur-trade marriages. Ojibwe marriages could be dissolved at will by either partner by simply walking out, and Ozhaguscodaywayquay seemed to have been troubled by the implication of a marriage "till death", which was the norm with Europeans at the time (British divorce laws were not liberalized until 1967-until then, divorce was very difficult to obtain in Britain and throughout the British Empire).

After the marriage, she was baptized as Susan. Despite this rough start to their marriage, by many accounts their marriage grew into a happy one. Ozhaguscodaywayquay ultimately decided that Johnston was the kindly white man she had seen in her "vision quest" when she was 13, and it was her destiny to marry him. Later in 1793 they moved east, settling at Sault Ste. Marie in present-day Michigan where they built a log-home that was the largest in the region. The settlement of Sault Ste. Marie extended on both sides of the river and was then considered part of Canada. The community was made up mostly of Ojibwa, Ottawa and Métis peoples, centered on a trading post of the British-founded North West Company, whose headquarter was in Montreal. A mixture of European immigrants also worked there. It became a center of European, United States, and Native American politics and trade in the area.

Johnston was a fur trader for the North West Company. He and his wife were influential in the trade and relations among the Ojibwe, Canadians, Europeans and Americans in the area. They received as hosts many explorers, politicians of both Canada and the U.S., scholars, Native chiefs, and military officers. They were considered among the ruling class in both the Native and European communities. Johnston owed much of his success to Ozhaguscodaywayquay's talents, influence, and connections as the member of an important Ojibwe family. Ozhaguscodaywayquay taught him and their children the language and ways of the Ojibwe. While she learned to understand English, she only spoke Ojibwe. John taught them to speak, read, and write English, and had a large library from which some of the children particularly drew.

From 1793 to 1816, Ozhaguscodaywayquay had eight children with John: Louis (or Lewis) Johnston (1793–1825), George Johnston (1796–1861), Jane Johnston (1800–1842), Eliza Johnston (1802–1884), Charlotte Johnston (1806–1878), William Johnston (1811–1863), Anna Marie Johnston (1814–unknown), and John McDowall Johnston (1816–1895). All of their children lived into adulthood.

Their eldest daughter Jane Johnston married the American ethnographer Henry Rowe Schoolcraft in 1823. Assigned to the community as the U.S. Indian agent in 1822, he became noted for his work on the Ojibwe, aided by Jane's access and her knowledge of the Ojibwe language and culture. Jane Johnston has been recognized as the first Native American literary writer and poet in the United States. In 2008, she was inducted into the Michigan Women's Hall of Fame.

Two other Johnston daughters also married prominent white men of the region; Anna Maria married Henry R. Schoolcraft's younger brother, James. George Johnston assisted Schoolcraft as a U.S. Indian agent. William Johnston took over the position when George left. The youngest son, John McDougall Johnston, served as the last official Indian Agent in the area.

== Later life ==
Under the Treaty of Ghent which ended the War of 1812, the U.S. no longer allowed British traders and trappers to move freely across the border between the U.S. and the British colony of Upper Canada. John Johnston's fur trade business never recovered. Lewis, the oldest son, had served with the Royal Navy against the U.S. Taken prisoner during the war, he suffered poor treatment by US forces and rejected living under U.S. rule. After his release, he moved to Upper Canada.

Ozhaguscodaywayquay's political influence grew after the War of 1812, as demonstrated by the story of she and her son, George, dissuaded Ojibwe leaders from attacking the treaty delegation led by Michigan Territory Governor Lewis Cass in 1820.

Ozhaguscodaywayquay was widowed in 1828. After her husband's death, she managed the family fur trading business. She also established a sugaring and fishing business, which she operated with the help of her children for several years. She was known as a physically active woman who caught and preserved local whitefish, regularly paddled her canoe across the broad St. Marys River (Michigan–Ontario), and annually spent time in the woods making large quantities of maple sugar, sometimes returning with as much as two tons. She also began to take an active role in the Presbyterian Church (USA) . Throughout her life, she played integral roles in her family and community as a business woman and leader.
