= Henry Schoolcraft =

American anthropologist (1793–1864)

Henry Rowe Schoolcraft
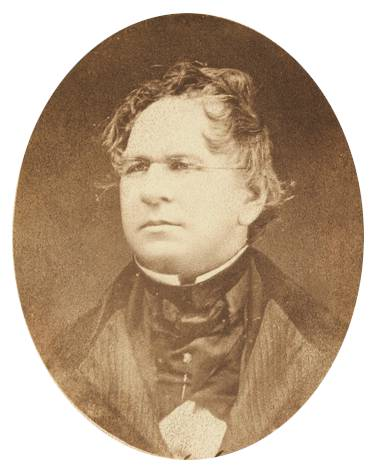
- Photo of Henry Schoolcraft in 1855
- Born: March 28, 1793; Guilderland, New York, U.S.
- Died: December 10, 1864 (aged 71); Washington, D.C., U.S.
- Occupations: geographer, geologist, and ethnologist
- Political party: Democratic
- Spouse(s): Jane Johnston; Mary Howard
- Family: John L. Schoolcraft (nephew)

Signature
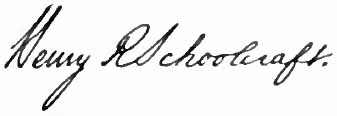

Henry Rowe Schoolcraft (March 28, 1793 – December 10, 1864) was an American geographer, geologist, and ethnologist, noted for his early studies of Native American cultures, as well as for his 1832 expedition to the source of the Mississippi River. He is also noted for his major six-volume study of Native Americans commissioned by Congress and published in the 1850s.

He served as United States Indian agent in Michigan for a period beginning in 1822. During this period, he named several newly organized counties, often creating neologisms that he claimed were derived from indigenous languages.

There he married Jane Johnston, daughter of a prominent Scotch-Irish fur trader and an Ojibwe mother, who was the high-ranking daughter of Waubojeeg, a war chief. Jane lived with her family in Sault Ste. Marie, Michigan. She was bilingual and educated, having grown up in a literate household. Jane taught Schoolcraft the Ojibwe language and much about her maternal culture. They had several children together, only two of whom survived past childhood. She is now recognized for her poetry and other writings as the first Native American literary writer in the United States.

Schoolcraft continued to study Native American tribes and publish works about them. In 1833, he was elected as a member of the American Philosophical Society.

By 1846, Jane had died. That year, Schoolcraft was commissioned by Congress for a major study, known as Indian Tribes of the United States. It was published in six volumes from 1851 to 1857, and illustrated by Seth Eastman, a career Army officer with extensive experience as an artist of indigenous peoples.

Schoolcraft remarried in 1847, to Mary Howard, from a slaveholding family in South Carolina. In 1860, Howard published the bestselling novel The Black Gauntlet. It was part of the Anti-Tom literature that was written in Southern response to the bestselling Uncle Tom's Cabin by Northern abolitionist Harriet Beecher Stowe.

== Early life and education ==
Schoolcraft was born in 1793 in Guilderland, New York, the son of Lawrence Schoolcraft and Margaret-Anne Barbara (née Rowe) Schoolcraft. He entered Union College at age 15 and later attended Middlebury College. He was especially interested in geology and mineralogy.

His father was a glassmaker, and Schoolcraft initially studied and worked in the same industry. At age 24, he wrote his first paper on the topic, Vitreology (1817). After working in several glassworks in New York, Vermont, and New Hampshire, the young Schoolcraft left the family business at age 25 to explore the western frontier.

== Exploration and geologic survey ==
From November 18 to February 1819, Schoolcraft and his companion Levi Pettibone made an expedition from Potosi, Missouri, to what is now Springfield. They traveled further down the White River into Arkansas, making a survey of the geography, geology, and mineralogy of the area. Schoolcraft published this study in A View of the Lead Mines of Missouri (1819). In this book, he correctly identified the potential for lead deposits in the region. Missouri eventually became the number one lead-producing state. (French colonists had earlier developed a lead mine outside St. Louis in the 18th century.) He also published Journal of a Tour into the Interior of Missouri and Arkansaw (1821), the first written account of a European-American exploration of the Ozark Mountains.

This expedition and his resulting publications brought Schoolcraft to the attention of John C. Calhoun, the Secretary of War, who considered him "a man of industry, ambition, and insatiable curiosity." Calhoun recommended Schoolcraft to the Michigan Territorial Governor, Lewis Cass, for a position on an expedition led by Cass to explore the wilderness region of Lake Superior and the lands west to the upper Mississippi River. Beginning in the spring of 1820, Schoolcraft served as a geologist on the Lewis Cass expedition. Beginning in Detroit, they traveled nearly 2,000 miles (3,200 km) along Lake Huron and Lake Superior, west to the Mississippi River, down the river to present-day Iowa, and then returning to Detroit after tracing the shores of Lake Michigan.

The expedition was intended to establish the source of the Mississippi River. It was also intended to settle the question of the yet undetermined boundary between the United States and British Canada. The expedition traveled as far upstream as Upper Red Cedar Lake in present-day Minnesota. Since low water precluded navigating farther upstream, the expedition designated the lake as the river's headwaters and renamed it in honor of Cass. (Schoolcraft noted, however, that locals informed the expedition that it was possible to navigate by canoe farther upstream earlier in the year when water levels were higher.) Schoolcraft's account of the expedition was published as A Narrative Journal of Travels Through the Northwestern Regions...to the Sources of the Mississippi River (1821).

In 1821, he was a member of another government expedition, which traveled through Illinois, Indiana, and Ohio. In 1832, he led a second expedition to the headwaters of the Mississippi River. While traveling alongside the Brule River, he met Ozaawindib, an Ojibwe agokwa, and hired him as a guide. Because they arrived at Cass Lake a month earlier than had the 1820 expedition, the group was able to take advantage of higher water to navigate to Lake Itasca. Ozaawindib successfully led the group to the headwater of the Mississippi, named Omashkoozo-Zaaga’igan or Elk Lake in Ojibwe. Schoolcraft renamed the headwater Lake Itasca based on the Latin words for truth (veritas) and head (caput).

== Marriages and family ==
Schoolcraft met his first wife Jane Johnston soon after being assigned in 1822 to Sault Ste. Marie, Michigan, as the first US Indian agent in the region. Two years before, the government had built Fort Brady and wanted to establish an official presence to forestall any renewed British threat following the War of 1812. The government tried to ensure against British agitation of the Ojibwa.

Jane was the eldest daughter of John Johnston, a prominent Scots-Irish fur trader, and his wife Ozhaguscodaywayquay (Susan Johnston), daughter of a leading Ojibwe chief, Waubojeeg, and his wife. Both of the Johnstons were of high status; they had eight children together, and their cultured, wealthy family was well known in the area.

Jane was also known as Bamewawagezhikaquay (Woman of the Sound the Stars Make Rushing Through the Sky). Her knowledge of the Ojibwe language and culture, which she shared with Schoolcraft, formed in part the source material for Longfellow's epic poem The Song of Hiawatha.

Jane and Henry had four children together:

- William Henry (June 1824 – March 1827) died of croup at nearly three. Jane Schoolcraft wrote poems expressing her grief about his loss.
- stillborn daughter (November 1825).
- Jane Susan Ann (October 14, 1827 – November 25, 1892, Richmond, Virginia), called Janee.
- John Johnston (October 2, 1829 – April 24, 1864), served in the Civil War but was wounded at the Battle of Gettysburg and disabled. He died at the age of 34 in Elmira, New York.

The Schoolcrafts sent Jane and John to a boarding school in Detroit for part of their education. Jane at 11 could handle the transition, but John at nine had a more difficult time and missed his parents.

The Schoolcrafts had a literary marriage, producing a family magazine. They included their own poetry in letters to each other through the years. Jane suffered from frequent illnesses. She died in 1842, while visiting a sister in Canada, and was buried at St. John's Anglican Church, Ancaster, Ontario.

On January 12, 1847, after moving to Washington, DC, at age 53 Schoolcraft married again, to Mary Howard (died March 12, 1878). She was a southerner and slaveholder, from an elite planter family of the Beaufort district of South Carolina. Her support of slavery and opposition to mixed-race unions created strains in her relationship with the Schoolcraft children. They became alienated from both her and their father.

After Schoolcraft's hands became paralyzed in 1848 from a rheumatic condition, Mary devoted much of her attention to caring for him and helping him complete his massive study of Native Americans, which had been commissioned by Congress in 1846.

In 1860, she published the novel The Black Gauntlet: A Tale of Plantation Life in South Carolina (which she said her husband had encouraged). One of many pro-slavery books published in response to Harriet Beecher Stowe's bestselling Uncle Tom's Cabin, such defenses of slavery, published in the decade before the American Civil War, became known as the anti-Tom genre. Hers became a best-seller, although not on the scale of Stowe's.

== Indian agent ==
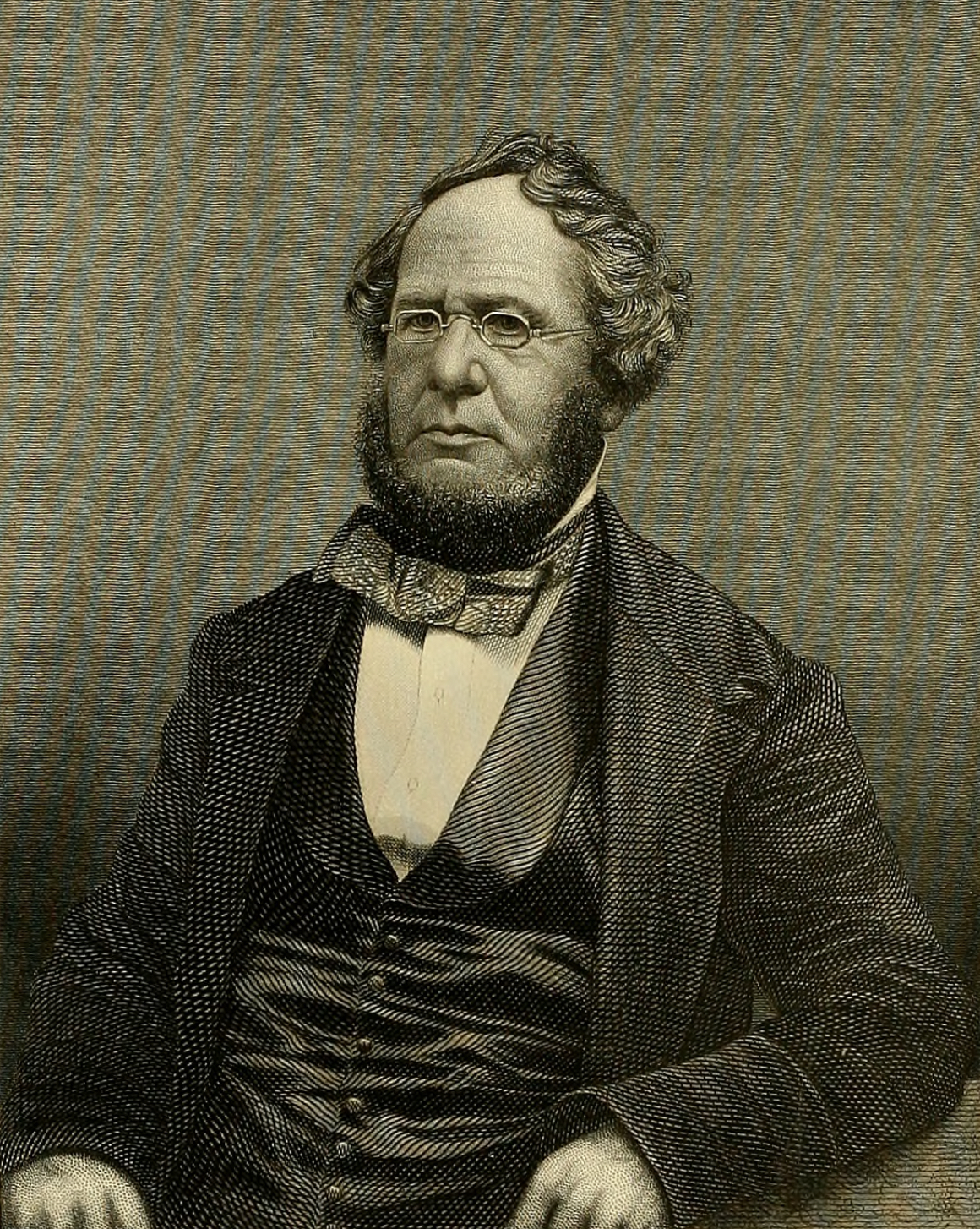
Henry Rowe Schoolcraft in 1884 engraving

Schoolcraft began his ethnological research in 1822 during his appointment as US Indian agent at Sault Ste. Marie, Michigan. He had responsibility for tribes in what is now northern Michigan, Wisconsin, and Minnesota. From his wife Jane Johnston, Schoolcraft learned the Ojibwe language, as well as much of the lore of the tribe and its culture.

Schoolcraft created The Muzzeniegun, or Literary Voyager, a family magazine which he and Jane produced in the winter of 1826–1827 and circulated among friends ("muzzeniegun" coming from Ojibwe mazina'igan meaning "book"). It contained mostly his own writings, although he did include a few pieces from his wife and a few other locals. Although they produced only single issues, each was distributed widely to residents in Sault Ste. Marie, then to Schoolcraft's friends in Detroit, New York, and other eastern cities. Jane Johnston Schoolcraft used the pen names of "Rosa" and Leelinau as personae to write about different aspects of Indian culture.

Schoolcraft was elected to the legislature of the Michigan Territory, where he served from 1828 to 1832. In 1832, he traveled again to the upper reaches of the Mississippi to settle continuing troubles between the Ojibwe and Dakota (Sioux) nations. He worked to talk to as many Native American leaders as possible to maintain the peace. He was also provided with a surgeon and given instructions to begin vaccinating Native Americans against smallpox. He determined that smallpox had been unknown among the Ojibwe before the return in 1750 of a war party that had contact with Europeans on the East Coast. They had gone to Montreal to assist the French against the British in the French and Indian War (the North American front of the Seven Years' War).

During the voyage, Schoolcraft took the opportunity to explore the region, making the first accurate map of the Lake District around western Lake Superior. Following the lead of Ozawindib, an Ojibwe guide, Schoolcraft encountered the true headwaters of the Mississippi River, a lake that the natives called "Omushkos", meaning Elk Lake. which Schoolcraft renamed Lake Itasca, a name which he coined from the Latin words veritas meaning 'truth' and caput meaning 'head'. The nearby Schoolcraft River, the first major tributary of the Mississippi, was later named in his honor. United States newspapers widely covered this expedition. Schoolcraft followed up with a personal account of the discovery with his book, Narrative of an Expedition Through the Upper Mississippi River to Itasca Lake (1834).

After his territory for Indian Affairs was greatly increased in 1833, Schoolcraft and his wife Jane moved to Mackinac Island, the new headquarters of his administration. In 1836, he was instrumental in settling land disputes with the Ojibwe. He worked with them to accomplish the Treaty of Washington (1836), by which they ceded to the United States a vast territory of more than 13 million acres (53,000 km^{2}), worth many millions of dollars. He believed that the Ojibwe would be better off learning to farm and giving up their wide hunting lands. The government agreed to pay subsidies and provide supplies while the Ojibwe made a transition to a new way of living, but its provision of the promised subsidies was often late and underfunded. The Ojibwe suffered as a result.

In 1838 pursuant to the terms of the treaty, Schoolcraft oversaw the construction of the Indian Dormitory on Mackinac Island. The building is listed on the National Register of Historic Places. It provided temporary housing to the Ojibwe who came to Mackinac Island to receive annuities during their transition to what was envisioned by the US government as a more settled way of life.

In 1839 Schoolcraft was appointed Superintendent of Indian Affairs in the Northern Department. He began a series of Native American studies later published as the Algic Researches (2 vols., 1839). These included his collection of Native American stories and legends, many of which his wife Jane Johnston Schoolcraft told him or translated for him from her culture.

While in Michigan, Schoolcraft became a member of the Board of Regents of the University of Michigan in its early years. In this position he helped establish the state university's financial organization.

== Founding magazines ==
Schoolcraft founded and contributed to the first United States journal on public education, The Journal of Education. He also published The Souvenir of the Lakes, the first literary magazine in Michigan.

== Naming places ==
Schoolcraft named many of Michigan's counties and locations within the former Michigan Territory. He named Leelanau County, Michigan after his wife's pen name of "Leelinau". For those counties established in 1840, he made elisions – the process of joining or merging morphemes that contained abstract ideas from multiple languages – to form unique place names he considered as never previously used in North America. In names such as Alcona, Algoma, Allegan, Alpena, Arenac, Iosco, Kalkaska, Leelanau, Lenawee, Oscoda, and Tuscola, for example, Schoolcraft combined words and syllables from Native American languages with words and syllables from Latin and Arabic. Lake Itasca, the source lake of the Mississippi River, is another example of his eliding Native American and Latin morphemes. In 1843 the unique names of six counties named in 1840 after Native Michigan chiefs were erased – Kautawaubet County, Kaykakee County, Keskkauko County, Meegisee County, Mikenauk County, and Tonedagana County. But none of the 1840 counties with unique Schoolcraft elisions were changed.

== Later years ==
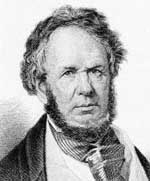
Woodcut of Henry Rowe Schoolcraft

When the Whig Party came to power in 1841 with the election of William Henry Harrison, Schoolcraft lost his political position as Indian agent. He and Jane moved to New York. She died the next year during a visit with a sister in Canada, while Schoolcraft was traveling in Europe.

He continued to write about Native Americans. In 1846 Congress commissioned him to develop a comprehensive reference work on American Indian tribes. Schoolcraft traveled to England to request the services of George Catlin to illustrate his proposed work, as the latter was widely regarded as the premier illustrator of Indian life. Schoolcraft was deeply disappointed when Catlin refused. Schoolcraft later engaged the artist Seth Eastman, a career Army officer, as illustrator. An Army captain and later brigadier general, Eastman was renowned for his paintings of Native American peoples. He had two extended assignments at Fort Snelling in present-day Minnesota, the second time as commander of the fort, and had closely studied, drawn and painted the people of the Indian cultures of the Great Plains.

Schoolcraft worked for years on the history and survey of the Indian tribes of the United States. It was published in six volumes from 1851 to 1857 by J. B. Lippincott & Co. of Philadelphia. Critics praised its scholarship and valuable content by Schoolcraft, and the meticulous and knowledgeable illustrations by Eastman. Critics also noted the work's shortcomings, including a lack of index, and poor organization, which made the information almost inaccessible. Almost 100 years later, in 1954, the Bureau of American Ethnology of the Smithsonian Institution prepared and published an index to the volumes. (It was not until 1928 that the US government conducted another overall study of the conditions of American Indians; it was informally known as the Meriam Report, after the technical director of the team, Lewis Meriam.)

Schoolcraft died in Washington, D.C., on December 10, 1864. After his death, Schoolcraft's second wife Mary donated over 200 books from his library, which had been published in 35 different Native American languages, to the Boston Athenæum. Schoolcraft and Mary were each buried in the Congressional Cemetery in Washington, DC. His papers are archived in the Library of Congress.

Schoolcraft was the granduncle of Vice President James S. Sherman.

== Selected works of Henry Rowe Schoolcraft ==
=== Books ===
==== Early volumes, published mostly in New York State (1819-1849) ====
- A view of the lead mines of Missouri : including some observations on the mineralogy, geology, geography, antiquities, soil, climate, population, and productions of Missouri and Arkansaw, and other sections of the western country : accompanied by three engravings. New York: Charles Wiley, 1819, 294 pages.
- Journal of a tour into the interior of Missouri and Arkansaw : from Potosi, or Mine á Burton, in Missouri Territory, in a south-west direction, toward the Rocky Mountains: performed in the years 1818 and 1819. London: Sir Richard Phillips and Co, 1821, 102 pages. Republished in 1996 as Rude Pursuits an Rugged Peaks; Schoolcraft's Ozark Journal 1818-1819, with an Introduction, Maps, and Appendix by Milton D. Rafferty. Fayetteville: University of Arkansas Press.
- Narrative Journal of travels Through the Northwestern Regions of the United States Extending from Detroit through the Great Chain of the American Lakes to the Sources of the Mississippi River in the year 1820. Albany: E. & E. Hosford, 1821, 419 pages; republished in 1953, and again in 1992, under the same title with an introductory essay by Mentor L. Williams, ed., and additional material, East Lansing, Michigan: The Michigan State College Press.
- Travels in the central portions of the Mississippi valley: comprising observations on its mineral geography, internal resources, and aboriginal population. New York: Collins and Hannay, 1825, 459 pages.
- Narrative of an expedition through the upper Mississippi to Itasca Lake, the actual source of this river; embracing an exploratory trip through the St. Croix and Burntwood (or Broule) Rivers, in 1832. New York: Harper & Brothers, 1834, 307 pages.
- Algic Researches, a book of Indian allegories and legends (2 vols., 1839), 498 pages, including two introductory essays: "General considerations," 20 pages, and "Preliminary Observations on the Tales," 24 pages, New York: Harper Brothers. [46 tales in total].
- Oneota, or Characteristics of the Red Race of America. New York and London: Wiley & Putnam, 1845. 512 pages. ["Issued in 8 paper-covered numbers. The first 4 were published in 1844, beginning with Number I, in August; the last four appeared in 1845." according to p. 637 of Chase S. Osborn & Stellanova Osborn, Schoolcraft, Longfellow, Hiawatha. Lancaster PA: The Jaques Cattell Press, 1942. Schoolcraft himself explains some of the publication history of this 8-issue periodical, ONEOTA, in the Preface of the 1845 volume, pp. v, vi, and describes his "giving to these detached issues a consolidated form."]
- Oneota, first redacted version, and reprinted under three different names, by three different publishers, in the years 1847-1848: The Red Race of America. New York: W.H. Graham, 1847. 416 pages, being a partial reprint of Oneota (1845), missing approx. 96 pages of the 1845 book, and substantially reorganized; reprinted in 1848 with a new title: The Indian in his wigwam, or, Characteristics of the red race of America: from original notes and manuscripts, New York: Dewitt and Davenport. 1848; reprinted in 1848 as The Indian in his wigwam, etc. New York: W.H. Graham. 1848; and again in 1848 with a different publisher: Buffalo, NY: Derby & Hewson.
- Oneota, second redacted version, and reprinted under two different names, by two different publishers, missing the same 96 pages as the first redacted version, but with the addition of "Captivity Narratives", 1851-1853: The American Indians: their history, condition and prospects, from original notes and manuscripts. Buffalo: George H. Derby and Co., 1851, 495 pages, being a reprint of The Red Race of America (1847) and The Indian in his wigwam (1848), but with an additional 'Appendix' of 78 pages, containing 'Captivity Narratives' of Alexander Henry, Quintin Stockwell, Peter Williamson, Jonathan Carver, and Mrs. Scott); reprinted as The American Indians, etc. Rochester: Wanzer, Foot and Co., 1851; reprinted in 1853 as Western Scenes and Reminiscences: Together with Thrilling Legends and Traditions of the Red Men of the Forest. Auburn: Derby and Miller; Buffalo: Derby, Orton & Mulligan, 1853. 495 pages, including a new 3-page table of contents on pages iii-v.
- Notes on the Iroquois, or, contributions to the Statistics, Aboriginal History, Antiquities and General Ethnology of Western New-York, New-York: Bartlett & Welford, Astor House. 1846. 285 pages. Reprinted, with substantial additions, as Notes on the Iroquois; or contributions to American History, Antiquities, and General Ethnology. Albany: Erastus H. Pease & Co. 1847. 498 pages.

==== Historical and Statistical Information etc. / Archives of Aboriginal Knowledge (Pub. by Lippincott of Philadelphia: 1851-1860) ====
- Historical and Statistical Information respecting the History, Condition, and Prospects of the Indian Tribes of the United States, with illustrations by Capt. Seth Eastman, published by authority of Congress and prepared under the direction of the Bureau of Indian affairs, per act of Congress of March 3d, 1847 ... Illustrated by S. Eastman, Capt. U.S.A. Philadelphia: Lippincott, Grambo & co., 1851-1857. According to Osborn & Osborn, 1942 (p. 633): "6 parts, as follows: Part I, 1851. Half title, "Ethnological researches ..." iii-xviii, 13-568 p. Part II, 1852. Half title, "Ethnological Researches ..." (2), vii-xxiv, 17-608 p. Part III, 1853. Half title, "Ethnological Researches ..." v-635 p. Part IV, 1854. Half title, "Ethnological researches ..." v-xxvi, 19-668 p. Part V, 1855. Half title "Ethnological researches ... vii-712 p. Part VI, 1857. Half title, "General history of the North American Indians.: (2), vii-xxviii, 25-755 p. (Reviewed adversely in North American review v. 77, p. 245-62, July 1853.) Later ed. has title: Information resecting the the[sic] historuy...."; Osborn & Osborn's editor (Chase S. Osborn and Stellanova Osborn, Schoolcraft, Longfellow, Hiawatha, Lancaster, PA: The Jaques Cattell Press, 1942), Vernon Kinietz, adds the following footnote on pp. 633–634: "The bibliographer's task is complicated by a change in printers during the course of the publication of the first edition and particularly by the use of engraved and printed title pages in each volume which do not agree with each other or with the bastard title."; "The first volume of the first edition bore the title Historical and statistical information respecting the history, condition and prospects of the Indian tribes of the United States. The first three words of the title were dropped in the second and thorough the fifth volumes. The government stopped its subsidy of this work when the fifth volume came out but subsequently the sixth volume was brought out by the J.B. Lippincott and Co., successors to Lippincott, Grambo and Co. The first volume was also reprinted with the same title as the following volumes. Years of publication were I (1851) [2d printing 1853], II (1852), III (1853), IV (1854, V (1855), VI (1857)."; "Then in 1860 the J.B. Lippincott and Co. brought out a reissue of the work with the title Archives of Aboriginal Knowledge. The engraved title page of this issue, however, was the same as the revised one of the previous edition. The text otherwise was the same page for page, bu there was an index added to each volumen."; "I should have added above that the publishing house brought out the first edition in two forms, one on thinner and slightly smaller paper than the other. In this smaller form, however, on the first five volumes were published."

===== Other Schoolcraft works published by Lippincott (1853-1856) =====
- Scenes and Adventures in the Semi-Alpine Region of the Ozark Mountains of Missouri and Arkansas, a reprint of Journal of a Tour into the Interior, etc. (1821) including A View of the Lead Mines of Missouri (1819) as an appendix. (1853)
- Summary Narrative of an Exploratory Expedition to the Sources of the Mississippi River in 1820, resumed and completed by the Discovery of its Origin in Itasca Lake in 1832 being a complete reworking of HRS's 1821 work, which documented the 1820 expedition, and his 1834 work, which documented the 1832 expedition, adding additional material. (1854)
- The myth of Hiawatha, and other oral legends, mythologic and allegoric, of the North American Indians (Philadelphia: J.P. Lippincott & Co.; London: Trübner & Co.,1856), a partial reprint, and reworking, in a single volume of * Algic Researches (1839) with 42 tales (many of them new), without the original two introductory essays of Algic Researches, but with a new five-page preface dated at Washington, D.C., April 28, 1856; a new ten-page introduction; and a new 37-page appendix, "Wild Notes of the Pibbugwan", containing 28 poems. 343 pages.

=== Addresses, articles, book reviews, notes, pamphlets and reports ===
==== Addresses ====
- A memoir on the geological position of a fossil tree, discovered in the secondary rocks of the river Des Plaines. Read before the American Geological Society. Albany: E. and E. Horsford, 1822. [20 pages.]
- "A Discourse, delivered on the anniversary of the Historical Society of Michigan, June 4, 1830. Published by Request. By Henry R. Schoolcraft," (Detroit: Geo. L. Whitney, 1830); reprinted as "Discourse delivered before the Historical Society of Michigan. By Henry R. Schoolcraft. Some Remarks upon the origin and character of the North American Indians, &c." IN Historical and scientific sketches of Michigan, comprising a series of discourses delivered before the Historical Society of Michigan, and Other Interesting Papers Relative to the Territory. (Detroit: Stephen Wells and George L. Whitney, 1834), pp. 51–109, including 18 pages of 18 footnotes, seemingly new material and supplemental to the 1830 address reprinted in this 1834 volume. [59 pages.]
- "Influence of Ardent Spirits on the Conditions of Indians. An address read before the Chippewa County Temperance Society, at Sault Ste-Marie, May 8th, 1832,"; reprinted in Oneota, 1845, pp. 413–425. [13 pages.]
- "Address," contained in pp. 15–18 in Constitution of the Algic Society, instituted March 28, 1832 For encouraging missionary effort in evangelizing the north western tribes, and promoting education, agriculture, industry, peace & temperance, among them, to which is annexed an abstract of its proceedings, together with the introductory address by Henry R. Schoolcraft, Esq., president of the Society, Detroit: Cleland and Sawyer, 1833. [4 pages]
- Report on the Aboriginal Names and Geographical Terminology of the State of New York. Part I. - Valley of the Hudson. Made to the New York Historical Society -- by the committee appointed to prepare a map, etc., and read at the stated meeting of the Society, February, 1844. New York: Printed for the Author. 1845. [43 pages.]
- Historical Considerations or The Siege and Defence of Fort Stanwix, in 1777. Read before the New York Historical Society, June 19th, 1845. By Henry R. Schoolcraft. Published from the Society's Proceedings. New York: Press of the Historical Society. 1846. [29 pages.]
- An Address, delivered before the Was-ah Ho-de-no-son-ne or New Confederacy of the Iroquois, by Henry R. Schoolcraft, A Member: At its Third Annual Council, August 14, 1845. Rochester, NY: Jerome and Brother, Talman Block, Sign of the American Eagle, Buffalo-Street, 1846. [35 pages.]
- Plan for the investigation of American ethnology: to include the facts derived from other parts of the globe. And the eventual formation of a museum of antiquities and the peculiar fabrics of nations; and also the collection of a library of the philology of the world, manuscript and printed. Submitted to the Board of regents of the Smithsonian institution, at their first meeting, at Washington, in September, 1846. New York: Edward O. Jenkins, 1846. [13 pages.]
- "Notices of Some Antique Earthen Vessels Found in the Low Tumuli of Florida, and in the Caves and Burial Places of the Group of Indian Tribes, North of these Latitudes. Read at the Monthly Meeting of the New York Historical Society, June 1846." Proceedings of the New York Historical Society, For the Year 1846. New York: Press of the Historical Society. 1847. pp. 124–136. [13 pages.]
- Incentives to the Study of the Ancient Period of American History. An Address, delivered before the New York Historical Society, at its Forty-Second Anniversary, 17th November, 1846. New York: Press of the Historical Society. 1847. [38 pages.]

==== Articles and short stand-alone publications ====
- "Notes" to Henry Whiting, Sannillac, A Poem. With Notes, by Lewis Cass and Henry R. Schoolcraft, Esq.. Boston: Carter, Hendee and Babcock. 1831. Schoolcraft's notes to certain selections of Whiting's volume-length poem comprise the content of pages 129 to 137. [9 pages.]
- The Souvenir of the Lakes. Detroit: Geo.L.Whitney, 1831. [Schoolcraft may have been the editor of this publication, which includes several pieces by him.]
- "Education of the Indian Race." A paper originally written for the American Annals of Education and Instruction (October 1834 pp. 438–441; November 1834, pp. 491–496), a.k.a. the American Lyceum, 1834 [9 pages]; reprinted in an edited and expanded version, in Oneota, 1845, pp. 332–341. [9 pages].
- "Mythology, superstitions, and languages of the North American Indians." In: New York Literary and Theological Review, Vol. 2 (March 1835), pp. 96–121.[26 pages] Partially reprinted in Oneota, 1845, pp. 449–460. [13 pages]
- "Sketches of a Trip to Lake Superior" in 12 parts, presented over 5 instalments, in The Knickerbocker, or, New-York monthly magazine, in 1839 and 1840, as follows: Vol. XIII, Jan.-June, 1839 (March 1839 issue), pp. 211–215; Vol. XIII, Jan.-June, 1839 (May 1839 issue), pp. 428–432; Vol. XIV, July-Dec, 1839 (Sept. 1839 issue), pp. 254–256; Vol. XVI, July- Dec. 1840 (Sept 1840 issue), pp. 213–218; Vol. XVI July-Dec. 1840 (Oct. 1840 issue), pp. 326–330. [23 pages].
- Cyclopædia indianensis, of which only a single number was issued (1842).
- "Letters on the antiquities of the western country. By Henry R. Colcraft," in Commercial Advertiser, New York, in 10 numbered parts over 6 installments in 1843: Aug. 25, p. 2, column 3; Aug. 29, p. 2, col. 2; Aug.30, p. 2, cols. 1 and 2; Sept 2, p. 2, col. 2; Sept. 19, p. 2, col. 1; Oct. 18, p. 2, col.2; reprinted in Oneota as "Letters on the Antiquities of the Western Countries, Addressed to the Late William L. Stone, Editor of the New York Commercial Advertiser," pp. 385–403.[19 pages].
- "Indian Biography," United States Magazine and Democratic Review , Vol. XII, Jan.-July 1843 (April 1843 issue), pp. 401–408; reprinted as "Brant, Red Jacket, Uncas, Miontonimo. A notice of the biographies of the Late William L. Stone, prepared for the Democratic Review - 1843," in Oneota, 1845, pp. 352–363. [12 pages].
- "Our Indian Policy: With a Map." United States Magazine and Democratic Review 14, No. 68 (February 1844): pp. 169–184 (unsigned article); reprinted, without the map, as "Fate of the Red Race in America: The policy pursued towards them by government, and the present condition of the tribes who have removed west of the Mississippi" in Oneota, pp. 487–510. [24 pages].
- "Moowis, or The Indinan Coquette." Columbian Lady's and Gentleman's Magazine, Embracing Literature in Every Department (February, 1844): 90; reprinted, with emendations, as "Moowis, or The Man Made Up of Rags and Dirt. A Traditionary Legend of the Odjibwas." in Oneota, pp. 381–384. [4 pages].
- "Observations respecting the Grave Creek Mound in western Virginia". Transactions of the American Ethnological Society. Vol. 1, 1845, pp. 369–420. [51 pages].
- Outlines of the Life and Character of Gen. Lewis Cass. Albany:Joel Munsell, printer, 1848. [64 pages.]
- Bibliographical Catalogue of Books, Translations of the Scriptures, and other Publications in the Indian Tongues of the United States. Washington, 1849. [28 pages.]
- "A memoir on the history and physical geography of Minnesota." In Minnesota Historical Society. Annals, no. 2, 1851, pp. 144–157. Reprinted in Minnesota Historical Society. Collections, vol.1, 1872, pp. 108–132. [24 pages]

==== Book reviews by Schoolcraft (1828-1842), published separately but not "collected" in Oneota or elsewhere ====
- Review of "Decouverts des sources du Mississippi et de la Riviere Sanglante ..." by G.C. Beltrami (New Orleans, 1824). In: North American review, Vol. 27, No. 60 (July, 1828), pp. 89–115.
- Review of "Proceedings and Fourteenth Annual Report of the Board of Managers of the Baptist General Convention, at their meeting held in New York, April, 1828" and "A Discourse on the Occassion [sic] of Forming the African Mission School Society, delivered in Christ Church in Hartford, Conn. on Sunday Evening, Aug. 10, 1828. By J.M. Wainwright, D.D." In: North American review, Vol. 28, No. 63 (April, 1829), pp. 354–368.
- Review of Gallatin's "Synopsis of the Indian tribes within the United States . . ." by and in Archaeologia America: Transactions and Collections of the American Antiquarian Society, Vol. 2d, 1836. In: North American review, Vol. 45, No. 96 (July, 1837), pp. 34–59.
- Review of "Antiquitates Americanae, sive Scriptores Septentrionales Rerum Ante-Columbianarum in America" [English: "The Ante-Columbian History of America"], in American Biblical Repository, 2d series, Vol. 1, No. 2 (April 1839), pp. 430–439.
- Review of Catlin's Letters and Notes on the Manners, Customs, and Condition of the North American Indians and Bradford's American Antiquities and Researches into the Origin and History of the Red Race. In North American review, Vol. 54, No. 115 (April, 1842), pp. 283–299.

==== Posthumously published ====
- The Literary Voyageur, Sault Ste. Marie: 1826–27, a periodical, later collected and published as The Literary Voyageur or Muzzeniegen. Edited, with an Introduction by Philip P. Mason, East Lansing: Michigan State University Press, 1962, and again republished as Schoolcraft's Ojibwa Lodge Stories: Life on the Lake Superior Frontier. Edited, with a new introduction by Philip P. Mason, East Lansing: Michigan State University Press, 1997
- "Memoir of John Johnston." 1828, Published in Michigan Historical Collections. 36 (1908): 53–94
- "Notes for a Memoir of Mrs. Henry Rowe Schoolcraft." Michigan Historical Collections (1908): 95–100.

=== Poetry ===
- "Transallegania, or the Groans of Missouri," a poem (1820)
- "The Rise of the West, or a Prospect of the Mississippi Valley, a Poem." (Detroit, 1827, republished New York: Applegate, 1841).
- "Indian Melodies," a poem (1830)
- "The Man of Bronze or, Portraitures of Indian Character," possibly 1828, delivered before the Algic Society at its annual meeting in 1834.
- Iosco, or the Vale of Norma (Detroit, 1834)
- "Helderbergia, or the Apotheosis of the Heroes of the Anti-Rent War," an anonymous poem (Albany, 1835)
- Alhalla, or the Land of Talladega, a tale of the Creek war, with some selected miscellaneous, chiefly of an early date, by Henry Rose Colcraft. New-York and London: Wiley and Putnam. 1843. 116 pages. The title poem "Alhalla, or the Lord of Talladega" is extensively reviewed in The New World: A Weekly Family Journal of Popular Literature, Science, Art and News, Park Benjamin, ed. New York: J. Winchester, Publ. Vol. VII, No. 10, Saturday, September 16, 1843, pp 334, cols. 1&2, p. 335, cols. 1&2, and p. 336, col.1. Alhalla consists of an introduction and six stanza, and occupies the first 83 pages of the work. The remainder of the volume contains the following poems, "most ... having been written at an early period of life, and at widely distant geographical points, and many of them having been published in newspapers, magazines, or other forms, and not before reclaimed..." (p. 86): Pontiac's Appeal (pp. 87–93), Sault Ste. Marie, Nov. 7, 1825; Geehale. An Indian Lament. (pp. 93–95), Albany, 1820; The Choice. Addressed to a Young Lady (pp. 95–96). 1823; The Birchen Canoe. (pp. 97–98), Sault Ste. Marie, November 12, 1825; On Leaving the Village of Geneva in 1812. (pp. 98–99), undated; On Those Who Fell in the War of 1812. (p. 100), Keene, N.H., 1815; On the Marriage of Mr. Savage to Miss Wild (p. 100), 1811; Likes and Dislikes. (pp. 101–103), 1816; Washington, pp. 104–106, Mount Vernon, April 28, 1822; The White Fish, (pp. 106–109), July 21, 1824; A Tale of the North, (pp. 110–113). Sault Ste. Marie, 1832; There is a Time to Die, (p. 114)., N.Y. 1843; Lines, on the Death of Capt. M.M. Dox, late of the United States Army. (p. 115), Michilimackinac; The Chippewa Girl, (p. 116), undated; Shingabawossin, (p. 116), undated.

== Memberships ==
Elected a member of the American Antiquarian Society in 1821.

== Legacy and honors ==
Numerous counties, towns, lakes, streams, roads and other geographic features are named in his honor, including:

- Schoolcraft County in Michigan.
- Schoolcraft Township in Houghton County, Michigan.
- Schoolcraft Township in Kalamazoo County, Michigan.
- Schoolcraft Township in Hubbard County, Minnesota.
- The Village of Schoolcraft in Kalamazoo County, Michigan.
- Schoolcraft River and Schoolcraft Lake in Minnesota.
- Schoolcraft Island in Lake Itasca, Minnesota.
- U.S. Route 65 in the vicinity of Springfield, Missouri is named the Schoolcraft Freeway.
- Schoolcraft Roads are located in Marquette and Wayne Counties, Michigan, and in Dakota County, Minnesota.
- Schoolcraft College in Livonia, Michigan is named in his honor.
- Henry R. Schoolcraft Elementary School in Waterford, Michigan is named in his honor.
- Henry's Food Court on the Schoolcraft College campus in Livonia, Michigan is founded in his name.
- Schoolcraft State Park in Minnesota was established to commemorate his expeditions in 1820 and 1832.
- The Liberty ship SS Henry R. Schoolcraft was launched in 1943.
