= Waubojeeg =

Waubojeeg (White Fisher)
- Born: ca. 1747; Zhaagawaamikong
- Died: ca. 1793
- Title: Mississippi Ojibwa/Chippewa chief
- Father: Mamongazeda

Waubojeeg, also written Waabojiig or other variants in Ojibwe, "White Fisher" (c. 1747–1793) was a warrior and chief of the Ojibwe people.

He was born into the Adik (caribou) doodem (clan), some time in the mid-18th century near Zhaagawaamikong on the western end of Lake Superior. His father Mamongazeda (Big Foot) was also a noted warrior, who fought for the French in the Battle of the Plains of Abraham. Waabojiig lived during the Dakota-Ojibwe War. However, his family had intermarried with the Dakota before the war and he had several Dakota relatives, including the famous chief Wapasha I. He fought in several battles against the Dakota and Meskwaki during his lifetime. Most famously, the Battle of St. Croix Falls in 1770.

While a respected warrior, Waubojeeg was also known for his poetry. He created "Waubojeeg's Battle Song", which his son-in-law John Johnston translated into English:

"On that day when our heroes lay low, lay low,
On that day when our heroes lay low
I fought by their side, and thought, ere I died,
Just vengeance to take on the foe,
Just vengeance to take on the foe.

On that day, when our chieftains lay dead, lay dead,
On that day, when our chieftains lay dead,
I fought hand to hand at the head of my band,
And here on my breast have I bled, have I bled,
And here on my breast have I bled.

Our chiefs shall return no more, no more,
Our chiefs shall return no more -
Nor their brethren of war, who can show scar for scar,
Like women their fates shall deplore, deplore,
Like women their fates shall deplore.

Five winters in hunting we'll spend, we'll spend,
Five winters in hunting we'll spend,
Till our youth, grown to men, we'll to the war lead again,
And our days like our fathers' will end, will end,
And our days like our fathers' will end."

His children, notably his son Weshkii ("the renewer") and his daughter Ozhaguscodaywayquay, became prominent in the Sault Ste. Marie area, a major fur trading post.

Waubojeeg distrusted white men because of their encroachment on Native territory. When John Johnston, a young Scots-Irish fur trader, fell in love with his daughter, Ozhaguscodaywayquay, and asked the chief to be allowed to marry her, Waubojeeg at first refused.
