= National Register of Historic Places listings in Fremont County, Iowa =

Location of Fremont County in Iowa

This is intended to be a complete list of the properties and districts on the National Register of Historic Places in Fremont County, Iowa, United States. Latitude and longitude coordinates are provided for many National Register properties and districts; these locations may be seen together in a map.

There are 9 properties and districts listed on the National Register in the county, including one National Historic Landmark.

This National Park Service list is complete through NPS recent listings posted March 21, 2025.

	Name on the Register	Image	Date listed	Location	City or town	Description
1	Chautauqua Pavilion	Chautauqua Pavilion	October 22, 1976 (#76000773)	Iowa Highway 42; 40°40′55″N 95°34′09″W	Riverton	
2	Fremont County Courthouse	Fremont County Courthouse	July 2, 1981 (#81000238)	Clay St. 40°44′45″N 95°38′37″W	Sidney	
3	Hamburg Public Library	Hamburg Public Library	May 23, 1983 (#83000359)	1301 Main St. 40°36′23″N 95°39′27″W	Hamburg	
4	Hunter School	Hunter School	January 9, 2007 (#06001220)	Junction of U.S. Route 275 and 120th St. 40°52′24″N 95°40′16″W	Tabor	
5	Jason and Elizabeth Baylor Rector House	Jason and Elizabeth Baylor Rector House	February 4, 2002 (#01001542)	2174 Bluff Rd. 40°43′58″N 95°42′35″W	Thurman	
6	St. Patrick Church	St. Patrick Church	July 7, 1983 (#83000360)	3rd St. 40°52′51″N 95°25′32″W	Imogene	
7	Tabor Antislavery Historic District		October 31, 2007 (#07001117)	Park, Center, Orange, and Elm Sts. 40°53′57″N 95°40′29″W	Tabor	
8	Tabor Congregational Church	Tabor Congregational Church	October 6, 2011 (#11000720)	403 Elm St. 40°54′01″N 95°40′25″W	Tabor	
9	Todd House	Todd House	August 15, 1975 (#75000689)	Park St. 40°53′58″N 95°40′35″W	Tabor	

== See also ==
- List of National Historic Landmarks in Iowa
- National Register of Historic Places listings in Iowa
- Listings in neighboring counties: Atchison (MO), Cass (NE), Mills, Otoe (NE), Page
