= Chautauqua Pavilion =

Chautauqua Pavilion may refer to:

- Chautauqua Pavilion (Riverton, Iowa), listed on the National Register of Historic Places in Fremont County, Iowa
- Chautauqua Pavilion (Hastings, Nebraska), listed on the National Register of Historic Places in Adams County, Nebraska
