= Tabor Congregational Church =

- U.S. National Register of Historic Places
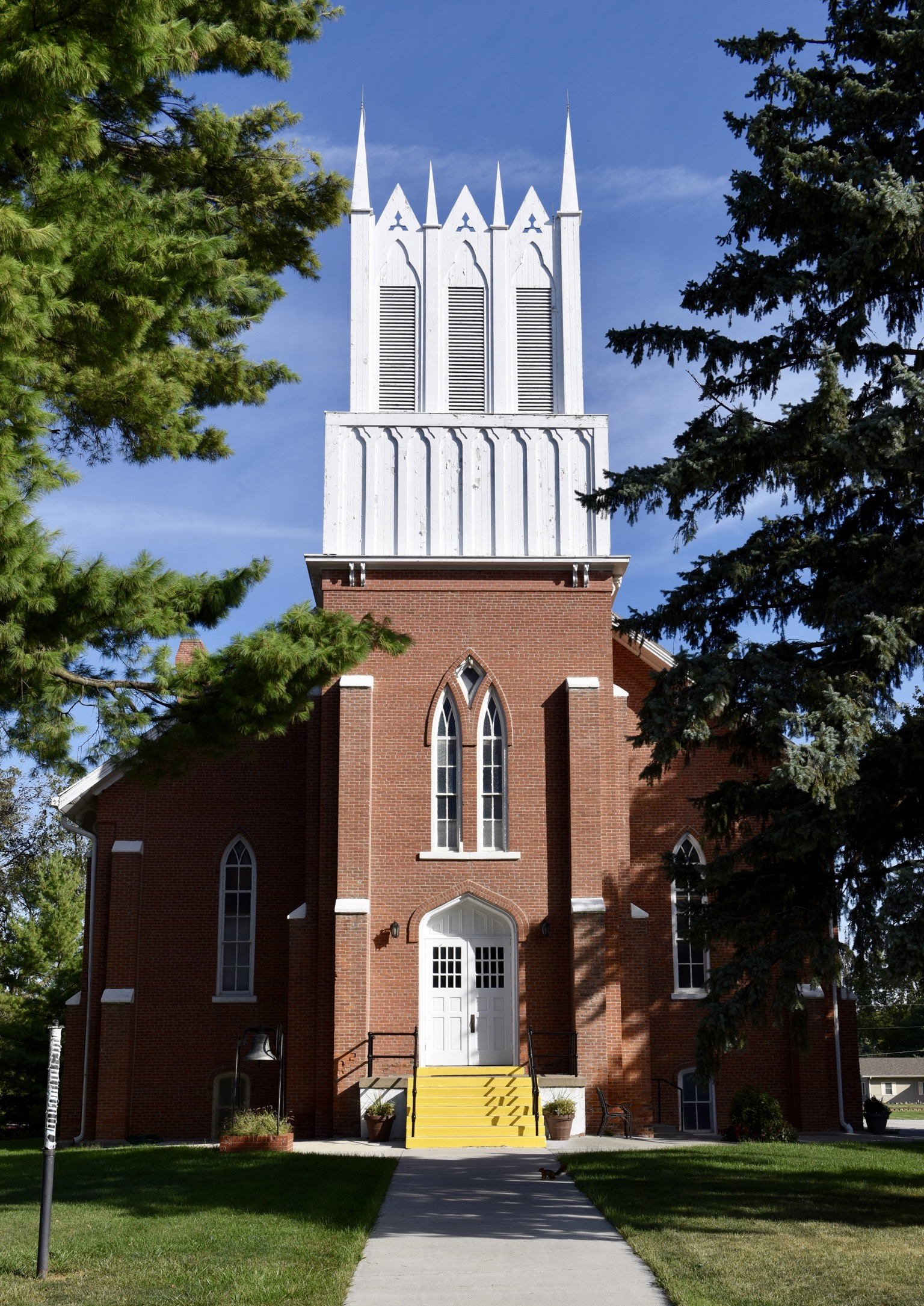

- Location within Iowa Location within the United States
- Nearest city: Tabor, Iowa
- Coordinates: 40°54′01″N 95°40′25″W
- Built: 1875
- Architect: J.K. Nutting
- Architectural style: Gothic Revival
- NRHP reference No.: 11000720
- Added to NRHP: October 6, 2011

Tabor Congregational Church is a historic Congregational church at 403 Elm Street in Tabor, Iowa, USA.

The church was designed by J.K. Nutting, who pastored The Little Brown Church and is similar in design to that church. The church building was completed in 1875. Before its completion, the congregation met in the chapel at Tabor College. The founding minister was John Todd), a prominent abolitionist in Tabor. The church building was added to the National Register of Historic Places in 2011.
