= Mary Elizabeth Perley =

American author (1863–??)

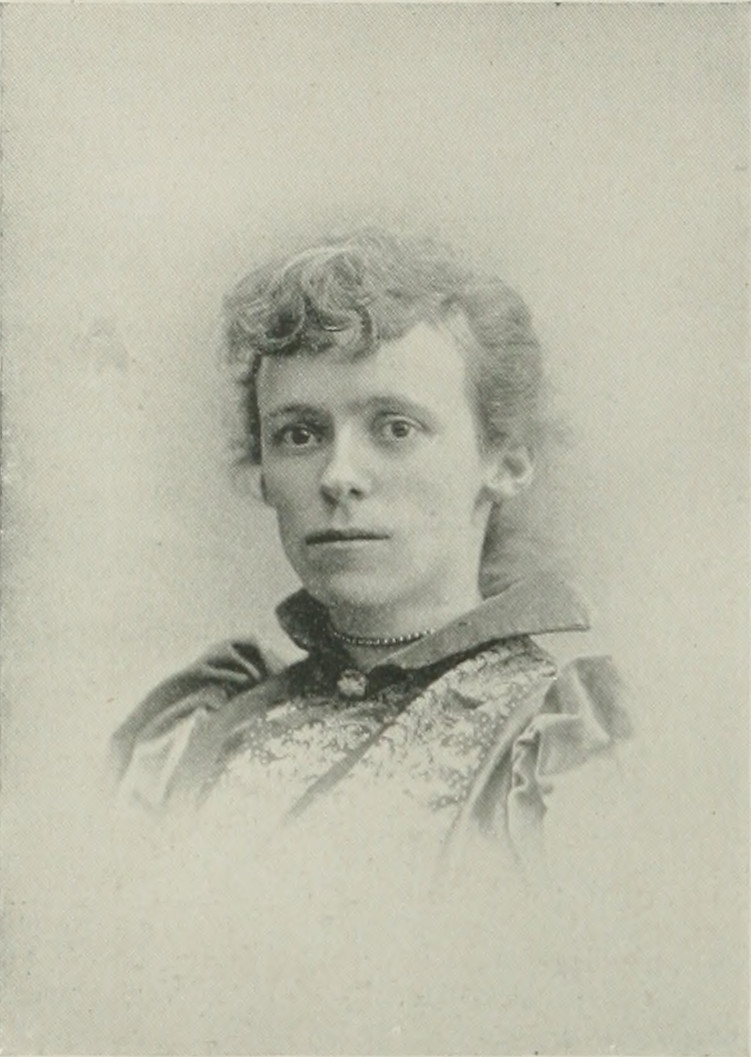
- Photo in A Woman of the Century
- Born: July 2, 1863; Lempster, New Hampshire, U.S.
- Died: Unknown
- Other name: May
- Education: Washington State University; University of Wisconsin; University of Oregon
- Occupations: writer; professor; poet
- Writing career
- Genres: poetry; short stories; plays

Mary Elizabeth Perley (July 2, 1863 – ?) was an American writer, professor, and poet. She taught at Tilden Ladies' Seminary, New Hampshire Conference Seminary, Tabor College, Fargo College, and the University of North Dakota. In addition to two books, she wrote poems, newspaper articles, short stories, and plays.

== Biography ==
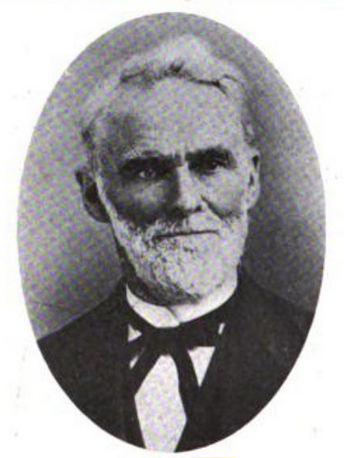
Asbury Perley (1907)

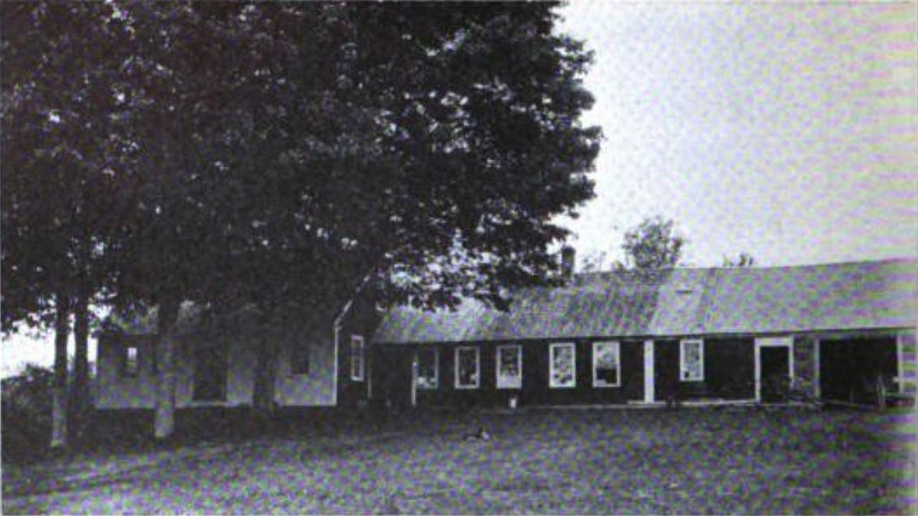
Perley homestead, Lempster, New Hampshire

Mary (nickname, "May") Elizabeth Perley was born in Lempster, New Hampshire, July 2, 1863. Her parents were Asbury F., an active Methodist, and Sarah J. (Dodge) Perley. She had three sisters, Louise S. and Maria R. (twins) and Jennie M., and two brothers, George E. and Ben F.

Perley was well-educated. She studied in the Tilden Ladies' Seminary of West Lebanon, New Hampshire, New Hampshire Conference Seminary, Tilton, New Hampshire, and Boston schools (high). She was a student in Hanover, 1890–1891; and attended summer school in the English Department at Harvard University in 1897. She studied at the University of Berlin, 1901–1902; and in 1902, graduated from Frau Dr. Hempel's Normal Seminar, Berlin. She also studied at the Cours Maintenan and Alliance Francaise of Paris; the Berlitz School; and the Lafayette College of Languages at the Boston University, 1902. Perley graduated from Washington State University (A.B., 1908); and did graduate study at the University of Wisconsin in summers of 1909 and 1910, where she received a master's degree in German. In 1912, she attended summer school at the University of Oregon.

Perley served as a teacher of modern languages in Tilton Seminary six years and taught French and German in the New Hampshire Conference Seminary. She was a professor of modern languages at Tabor College, Tabor, Iowa, 1904–1906. She served as professor of German at Fargo College, Fargo, North Dakota, from 1906; her brother, George E. Perley, sat on the college's Board of Incorporators. Beginning in 1921, she was an instructor in French, University of North Dakota.

At an early age, she began to contribute poems to the press. Her poems received extensive publication in the periodical press. Sketches of her life and poems from her pen appear in several compilations. She was known as a graceful and finished poet. As an avocation, she wrote occasional Sunday newspaper articles and short stories. She also wrote German playlets, adapted to high school or college dramatics, several of which were presented in the schools of North Dakota and Wisconsin. She published French fairy plays (with Mathurin Marius Dondo; New York, London Oxford University Press, 1923) and The Last of the Bodyguard: Smith Stimmel (Chicago, Methodist Book Concern, 1935).

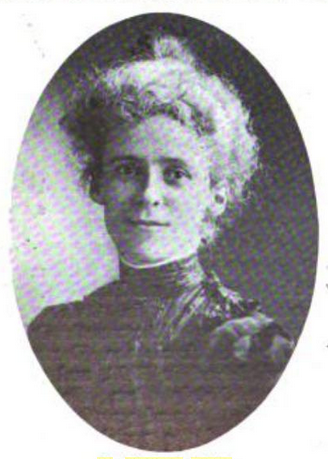
1907

In 1919, Perley resided in Fargo.

== Selected works ==
=== Books ===
- French fairy plays (with Mathurin Marius Dondo), 1923
- The Last of the Bodyguard: Smith Stimmel, 1935

=== Essays ===
- "The State University of Oregon", Oregon Teachers Monthly, vol. 17, pp. 77–79, 1912
- "Personal Recollections of President Lincoln", North-western Christian Advocate, vol. 69, p. 200, 1921

=== Plays ===
- The Christmas Guest; play in 1 act, 1915 (Fargo, N.D.)
