= Annette Finnigan =

American suffragist and philanthropist

- Born: 1873; West Columbia, Texas
- Died: July 17, 1940 (aged 66–67); New York City
- Education: Wellesley College, Columbia University
- Occupations: Merchant, business manager
- Known for: Annette Finnigan Endowment Fund, donation establishing Houston Carnegie Library
- Parent(s): John Finnegan and Katherine McRedmond
- Relatives: Katherine Finnigan, Elizabeth Finnigan (sisters)

Annette Finnigan (1873 – July 17, 1940) was an American suffragette, philanthropist, and patron of the arts.

== Early life ==
Annette Finnigan was born in 1873 to Katherine McRedmond and John Finnigan in West Columbia, Texas. John was a successful animal hide merchant. The following year, they moved to Houston, and Annette, along with her two sisters Katherine and Elizabeth went to the public schools, with Annette going to Houston High School. In 1888, as a result of John Finnigan Hide Company's success, the family moved east to oversee his operations in New York City. Annette finished her secondary education at Tilden Seminary in New Hampshire. She enrolled at Wellesley College, where she studied languages, rhetoric, art history, and the sciences. She was involved in the art society and the Wellesley Bicycle Club. Later, she studied philosophy at Columbia University.

== Work and philanthropy ==
After graduating in 1894, Finnigan found employment in the family business. She was inexperienced, writing “running a business takes an immense amount of experience and the responsibility worries me terribly.” Eventually, however, she became competent enough that when her father was away, he would leave Annette in charge of the business. She traveled abroad before returning home in 1903, when the family moved back to Houston, and were founding members of the Houston Equal Suffrage League. Despite their first effort to get a woman on the school board failing, she viewed it as a success, saying that it had highlighted “the importance of selecting persons of the highest intelligence, broadest culture and noblest character to guide the education of the city's children.”

Finnigan was president of the Hotel Brazos in 1907. After her father's death in 1909, she assumed control over his estate, as specified in his will. The most important of these assets were the John Finnigan Hide Company, the Houston Packing Company, and the Hotel Brazos Company. With the Women's Political Union and the Texas Woman Suffrage Association (both of which she headed), she led the push to pass an amendment giving women the right to vote. Though she stepped down from presidency of the Texas Woman Suffrage Association in 1915, she continued to help out, and advise. As the suffrage movement gained support, she suffered a serious stroke but continued in all her roles.

Finnigan was also one of the founders of the Houston Public Library, providing its first and largest grant. She was a passionate book collector, collecting many rare books including a copy of a book by Terence, which at the time was only one of two known in the world. She donated over 300 objects to the Museum of Fine Arts, Houston.

== Death and legacy ==
Finnigan died of cancer on July 17, 1940, in New York City. She is buried in Glenwood Cemetery. Her will designated $25,000 to establish the Annette Finnigan Endowment Fund, a $25,000 grant to Wellesley College, and large amounts of money to the American Foundation for the Blind and the American Commission for Mental Hygiene.
