= Tabor Antislavery Historic District =

Historic district in Iowa, United States

- U.S. National Register of Historic Places
- U.S. Historic district
- Location within Iowa Location within the United States
- Location: Park, Center, Orange & Elm Sts., Tabor, Iowa
- Coordinates: 40°53′58″N 95°40′35″W
- Area: 12 acres (4.9 ha)
- Built: 1853
- Architect: Samuel H. Adams; Rev. John Todd
- Architectural style: Mid 19th Century Revival
- NRHP reference No.: 07001117
- Added to NRHP: October 31, 2007

Tabor Antislavery Historic District is a historic district on Park, Center, Orange & Elm Streets in Tabor, Iowa.

The area was largely settled in 1853 and many mid-19th century revival buildings survive. The district includes the Todd House and the Public Square (Tabor City Park). This area was the home to several notable abolitionists, including Rev. John Todd. John Brown visited the area during his raids in the 1850s and camped in the square. It was also used by Tabor College (1853–1927) for recreational purposes. The area was added to the National Register of Historic Places in 2007.

== See also ==
- Todd House
