= J. Adam Bede =

American politician (1856–1942)

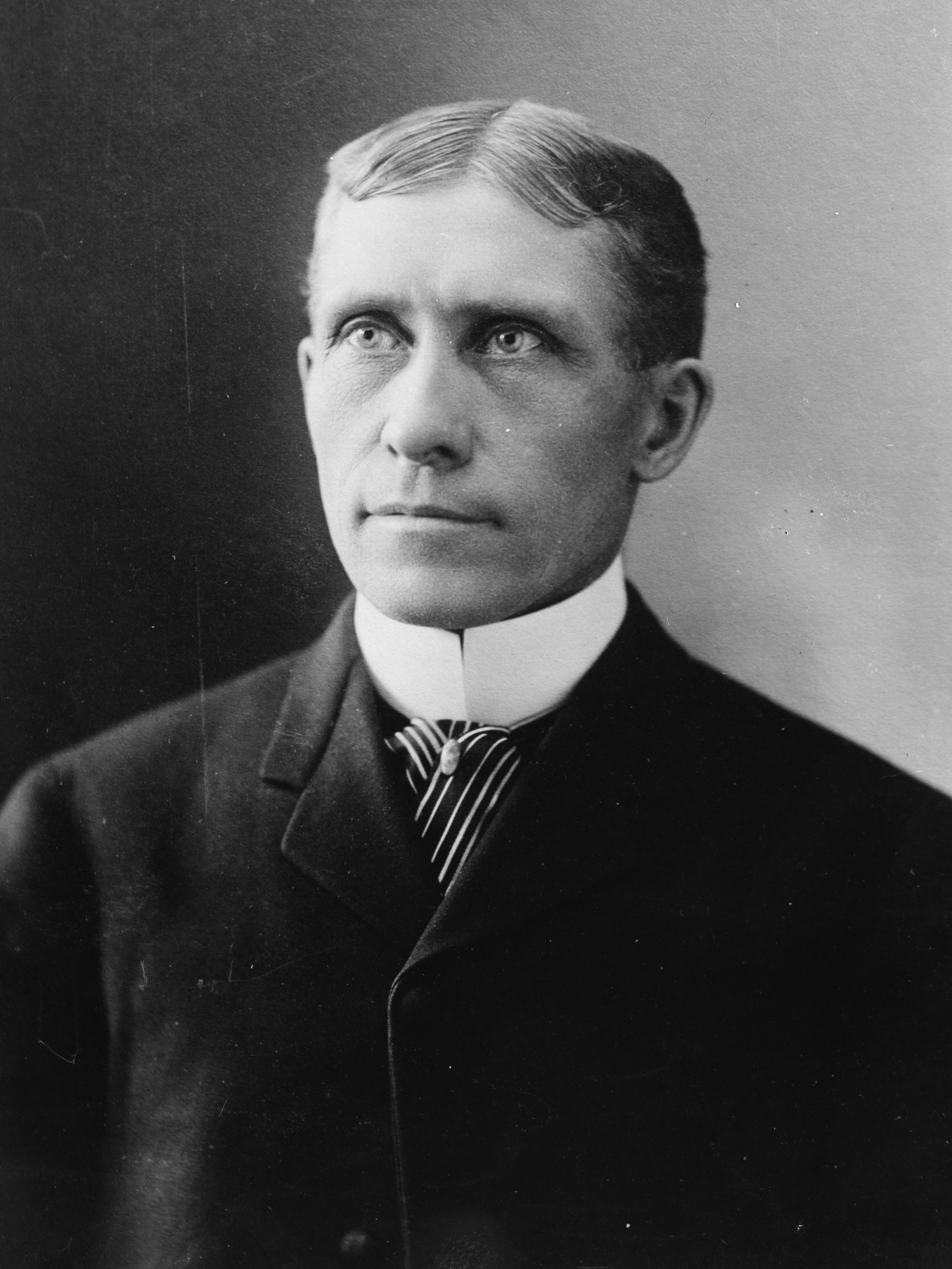
- Bede c. 1901–1903

Member of the U.S. House of Representatives from Minnesota's 8th district
- In office March 4, 1903 – March 3, 1909
- Preceded by: District established
- Succeeded by: Clarence B. Miller

Personal details
- Born: January 13, 1856 Eaton Township, Lorain County, Ohio, US
- Died: April 11, 1942 (aged 86) Duluth, Minnesota, US
- Party: Republican
- Education: Oberlin College; Tabor College
- Profession: Teacher, Printer, Speaker

James Adam Bede (January 13, 1856 – April 11, 1942) was an American politician who served as U.S. Representative from Minnesota.

== Early life and education ==
Bede and his twin brother were born on a farm in Eaton Township, Lorain County, Ohio. He spent his boyhood on a farm and attended the public schools of Ohio, Oberlin College, and Tabor College in Tabor, Iowa, and read law while learning the printing trade.

== Career ==
Bede taught school in Iowa, Ohio, and Arkansas. He was editor and publisher of several newspapers and periodicals, and served as a representative for several western newspapers in Washington, D.C. In 1886, he moved to Minnesota. He was engaged in newspaper work at Pine City, Minnesota, and spoke at the first annual dinner of the Associated Press in New York. Bede served as United States marshal for the district of Minnesota in 1894 during the Pullman strike, and was elected as a Republican to the 58th, 59th, and 60th Congresses (March 4, 1903 – March 3, 1909). His candidacy for renomination to the 61st Congress in 1908 was unsuccessful, and he returned to Pine City, where he was engaged as a publisher and lecturer. Bede moved to Duluth, Minnesota, in 1927, where he continued lecturing and publishing, and developed an interest in the Saint Lawrence Seaway project. Bede went on to represent St. Louis County in the Minnesota House of Representatives from 1931–1932.

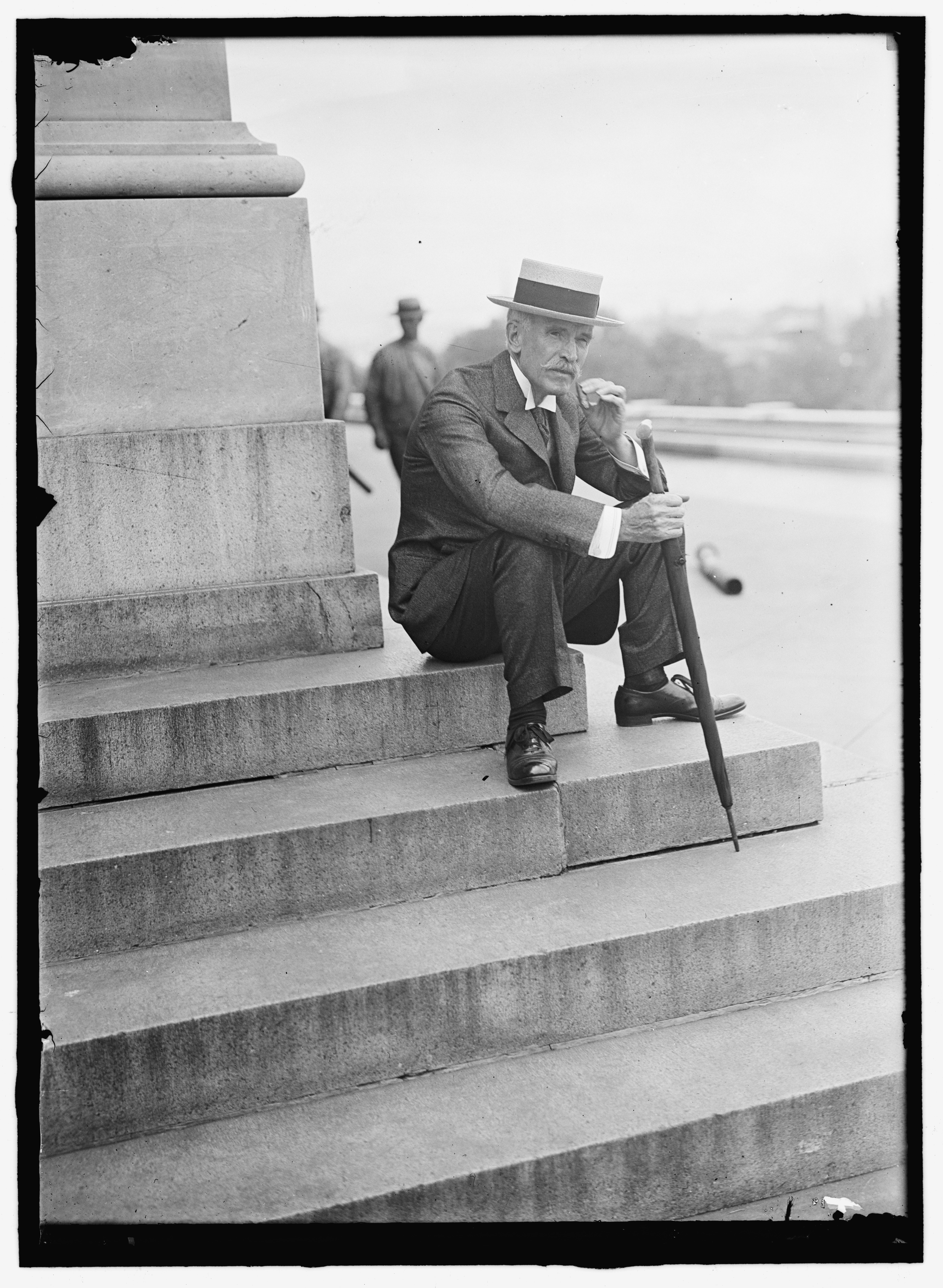
Rep. James Adam Bede

Bede was noted for his humor and speaking style. In an April 28, 1912 article titled "How Humor Enlivens the Solemn Work of Congress," the New York Times reported:

Adam Bede was one of the most popular stump speakers and spellbinders of the present generation. His speeches were full of dry humor and his droll manner of illustrating his arguments by stories of the day never failed to win the applause of his audiences.

In his book The Homesteaders, recounting life in rural Pine County in the early 20th century, O. Bernard Johnson describes Bede's speaking style as follows:

J. Adam Bede of Pine City, was a congressman in the early 1900s. He was a great humorist and had a rapid fire delivery. When running for reelection he spoke in our schoolhouse and had the audience in stitches during his entire speech. If he said anything seriously about the issues of the day no one can recall, but I am sure that his humor got him many votes.

== Personal ==
Bede was married and had seven children. He died in Duluth, Minnesota, April 11, 1942 and is buried in Birchwood Cemetery, Pine City, Minnesota.

U.S. House of Representatives
Preceded by —	U.S. Representative from Minnesota's 8th congressional district 1903–1909	Succeeded by Clarence B. Miller
