= Seminary Hill School =

Coordinates: 43°38′34″N 72°18′33″W

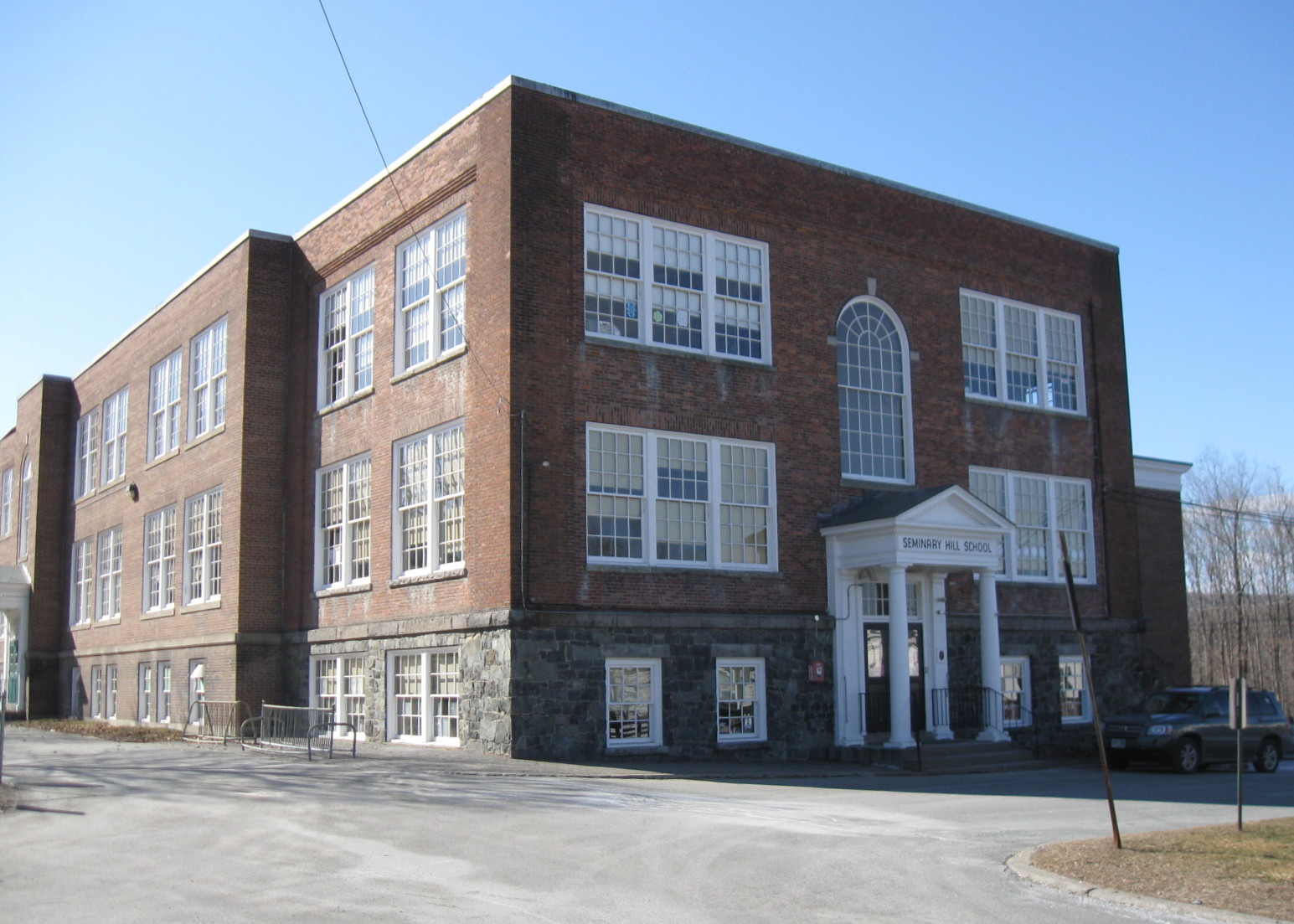
- 20 Seminary Hill; West Lebanon, NH; United States

Information
- Type: Public school
- Founded: 1854
- Principal: Martha Langill (~1987-2012)

Seminary Hill School (or Seminary Hill Elementary School) was a public school located at 20 Seminary Hill in West Lebanon, New Hampshire, United States. It closed in 2012.

The structure was built in 1854 under the direction of William Tilden as Tilden Female Seminary. It became West Lebanon High School from 1915 to 1961.

Seminary Hill School was an elementary school from 1961 until 2012. Within Lebanon School District, its role was to teach the older elementary grades for the western half of the town. For many years, it served grades 4–6, and from 2009 to 2012, grades 5–6. In its final year there were 196 students.

The school was closed as the district consolidated small schools and opened a new Lebanon Middle School in 2012. Since then, the building has served as administrative offices of Lebanon School District (SAU#88).
