= William Leighton Carss =

American politician

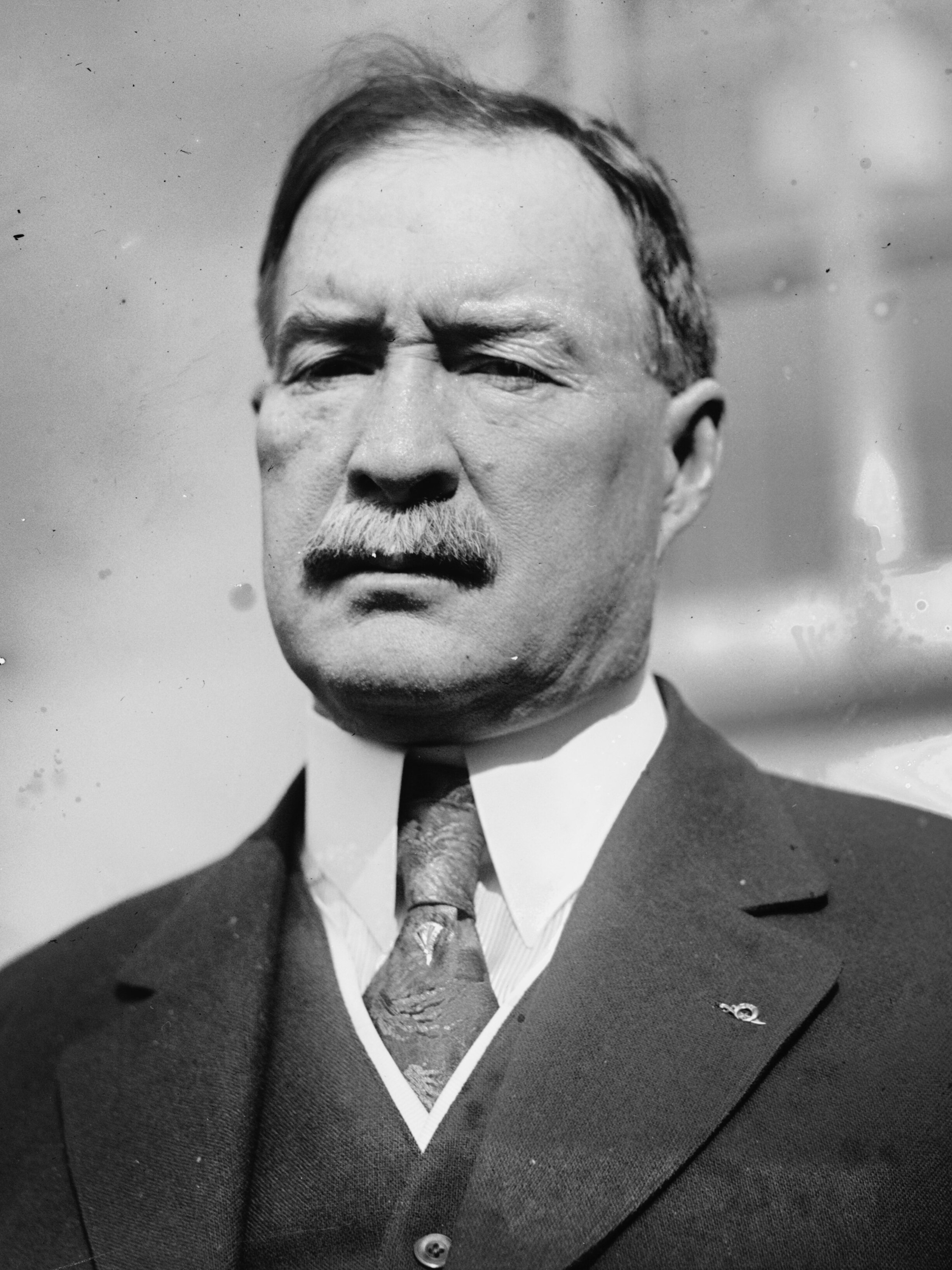
- Carss in 1920

Member of the U.S. House of Representatives from Minnesota's 8th district
- In office March 4, 1925 – March 3, 1929
- Preceded by: Oscar Larson
- Succeeded by: William Alvin Pittenger
- In office March 4, 1919 – March 3, 1921
- Preceded by: Clarence B. Miller
- Succeeded by: Oscar Larson

Personal details
- Born: February 15, 1865 Pella, Iowa, U.S.
- Died: May 31, 1931 (aged 66) Duluth, Minnesota, U.S.
- Party: Farmer–Labor; Democratic; Duluth Union Labor Party
- Occupation: Locomotive engineer

William Leighton Carss (February 15, 1865 – May 31, 1931) was an American locomotive engineer and politician who served as a U.S. representative from Minnesota's 8th congressional district from 1919 to 1921 and again from 1925 to 1929. He was the first member of the Minnesota Farmer–Labor Party elected to Congress.

== Biography ==
Carss born in Pella, Marion County, Iowa and subsequently moved with his parents to Des Moines, Iowa, in 1867. There he attended the public schools, studied civil and mechanical engineering and followed that profession for a number of years. He moved to St. Louis County, Minnesota in 1893 and settled in Proctor where he found work as a locomotive engineer and became a member of the Brotherhood of Locomotive Engineers. Carss was elected as a candidate for the Duluth Union Labor Party to the 66th congress (March 4, 1919 – March 3, 1921) from Minnesota's 8th congressional district. However, the Duluth Union Labor Party was currently in the process of merging with the Farmer-Labor Party and Carss was inaugurated as a Farmer-Laborite.

Carss was fond of British literature, reciting selections from Shakespeare, Carlyle and Burns by heart. He sponsored pro-labor legislation during his first term, supporting old age pensions (anticipating the Social Security system), women's rights and (to the dismay of some of his supporters) the Prohibition Amendment.

Carss was an unsuccessful candidate for reelection as a Democrat in 1920 to the 67th congress and for election in 1922 to the 68th congress. He was elected on the Farmer-Labor ticket to the 69th and 70th congresses (March 4, 1925 – March 3, 1929); but was defeated for reelection in 1928 to the 71st congress. Carss moved to Duluth in 1929 where he resumed his position as a locomotive engineer at Proctor. He was unsuccessful in his 1930 bid for election to the 72nd congress. He died in Duluth on May 31, 1931, and was interred in Oneota Cemetery.

U.S. House of Representatives
Preceded by Clarence B. Miller	U.S. Representative from Minnesota's 8th congressional district 1919 – 1921	Succeeded by Oscar Larson
Preceded by Oscar Larson	U.S. Representative from Minnesota's 8th congressional district 1925 – 1929	Succeeded by William Pittenger
