= Clarence B. Miller =

American politician

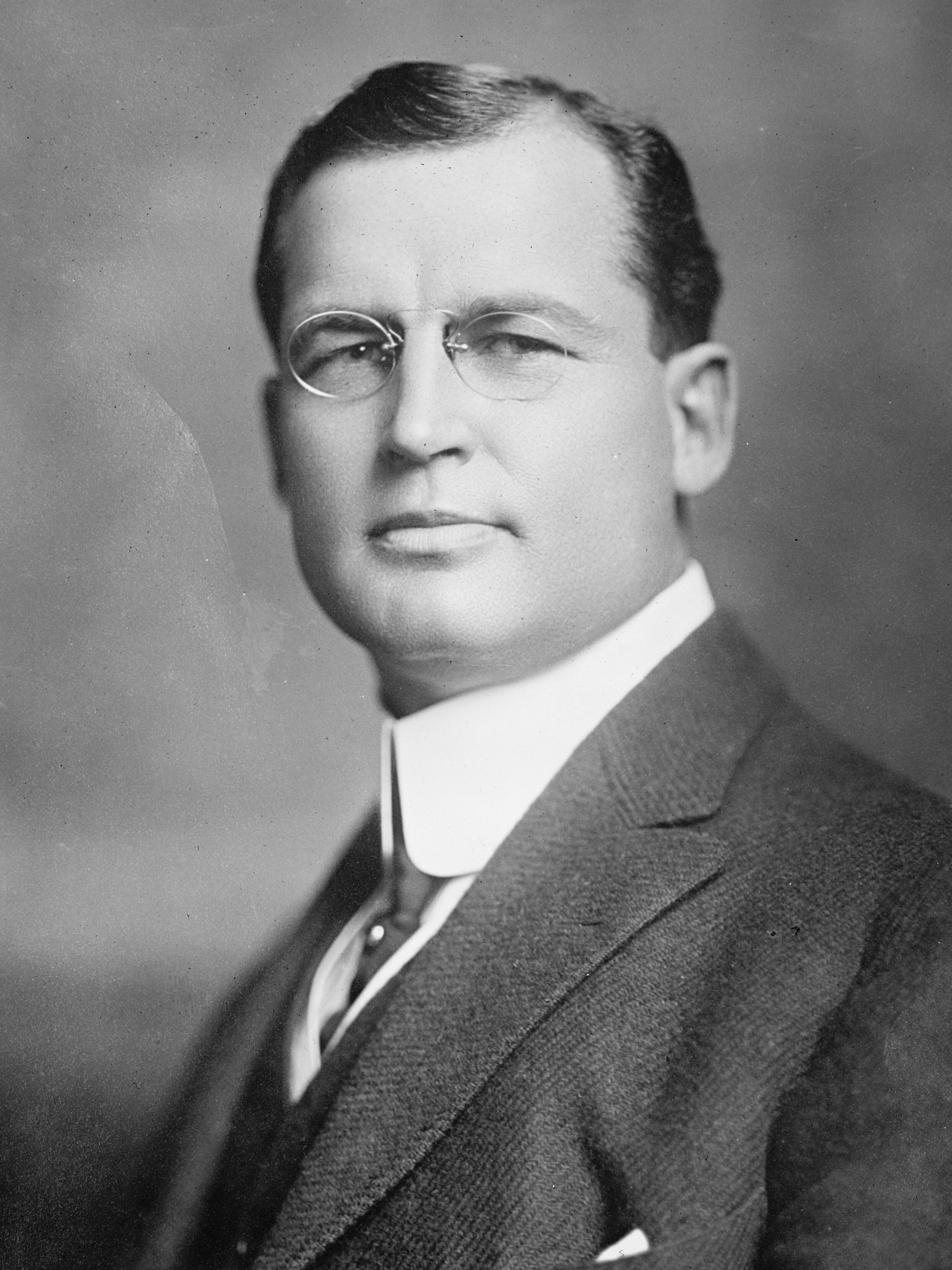

Member of the U.S. House of Representatives from Minnesota's 8th district
- In office March 4, 1909 – March 3, 1919
- Preceded by: J. Adam Bede
- Succeeded by: William Leighton Carss

Personal details
- Born: Clarence Benjamin Miller; March 13, 1872 Pine Island, Minnesota, U.S.
- Died: January 10, 1922 (aged 49) Saint Paul, Minnesota, U.S.
- Party: Republican
- Profession: Politician

Clarence Benjamin Miller (March 13, 1872 – January 10, 1922) was a U.S. representative from Minnesota. He was born in Pine Island, Minnesota and attended the country school, high school, and the Minneapolis Academy; was graduated from the academic department of the University of Minnesota at Minneapolis in 1895 and from the law department of the same institution in 1900; superintendent of the public schools of Rushford, Minnesota, 1895 – 1898; was admitted to the bar in 1900 and commenced the practice of law in Duluth; member of the State House of Representatives in 1907; elected as a Republican to the 61st, 62nd, 63rd, 64th, and 65th congresses, (March 4, 1909 – March 3, 1919); unsuccessful candidate for reelection in 1918; member of the congressional investigating committee to the Philippine Islands in 1915; special investigator for the War Department to the western front in France in 1917; elected assistant secretary of the Republican National Committee in 1919 and was chosen its secretary in 1920; engaged in the practice of law in Washington, D.C.; died in Saint Paul, Minnesota; interment in Pine Island Cemetery, Pine Island.

U.S. House of Representatives
Preceded by James Bede	U.S. Representative from Minnesota's 8th congressional district 1909 – 1919	Succeeded by William Leighton Carss
