= Oscar Larson =

American politician (1871–1957)

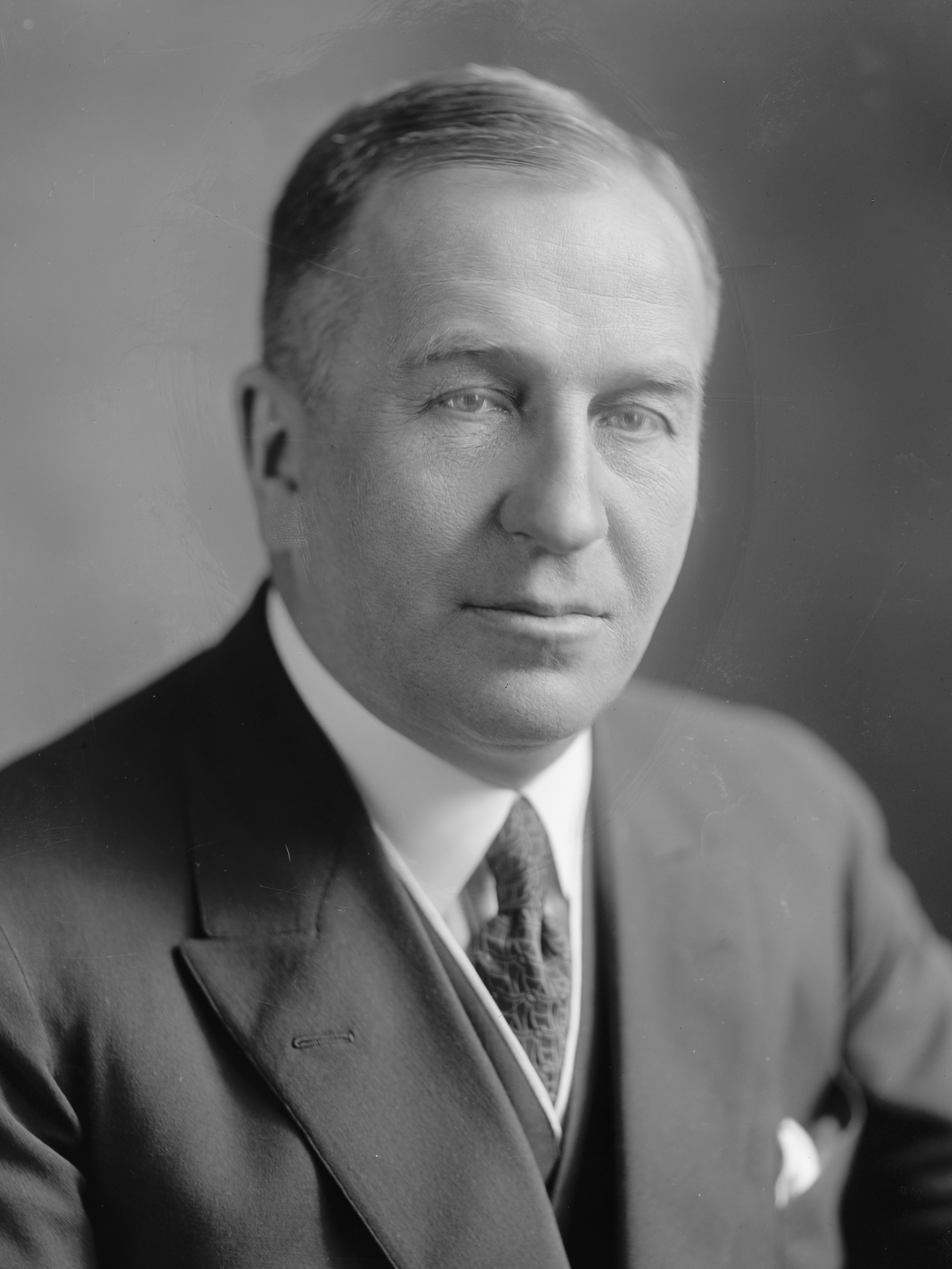
- Larson, 1905–1945

Member of the U.S. House of Representatives from Minnesota's 8th district
- In office March 4, 1921 – March 3, 1925
- Preceded by: William Leighton Carss
- Succeeded by: William Leighton Carss

Personal details
- Born: May 20, 1871 Uleåborg, Grand Duchy of Finland, Russian Empire
- Died: August 1, 1957 (aged 86) Duluth, Minnesota, U.S.
- Party: Republican
- Education: Northern Indiana Normal School; University of Michigan Law School

Oscar John Larson (May 20, 1871 – August 1, 1957) was a U.S. representative from Minnesota.

== Life ==
Larson was born in a Swedish-speaking family in Uleåborg in the Grand Duchy of Finland (then part of the Russian Empire). He immigrated to the United States in 1876 with his parents, who settled in Calumet, Michigan. He attended the public schools and graduated from the Northern Indiana Normal School (now Valparaiso University) in 1891. He subsequently graduated from the law department of the University of Michigan at Ann Arbor in 1894, was admitted to the bar and commenced practice in Calumet in 1894. He served as the prosecuting attorney for Houghton County from 1899 to 1904. In 1907, he moved to Duluth, Minnesota and continued the practice of law. He was elected as a Republican to the 67th and 68th congresses, (March 4, 1921 – March 3, 1925), opting not to run for re-election in 1924. He resumed the practice of law for many years and died in Duluth on August 1, 1957. He is buried in Forest Hill Cemetery in Duluth, Minnesota.

== Awards and recognitions ==
Larson received the Order of the White Rose of Finland (knight) in 1920, and he was promoted to commander in 1933.

U.S. House of Representatives
Preceded by William Leighton Carss	U.S. Representative from Minnesota's 8th congressional district 1921 – 1925	Succeeded by William Leighton Carss
