= Jessie Field Shambaugh =

American educator and activist (1881–1971)

Celestia Josephine "Jessie" Field Shambaugh (21 June 1881 – 15 January 1971) was an American educator and activist known as the "Mother of 4-H Clubs."

== Life and career ==
Jessie Field Shambaugh is called the "Mother of 4-H." She started after-school clubs in 1901 while teaching at Goldenrod School in Page County, Iowa. She was born near Shenandoah, Iowa on Sunnyside Farm to Solomon Elijah Field Sr. and Celestia Josephine Eastman Field, she graduated from Shenandoah High School in 1899 and Tabor College with a Bachelor of Arts degree in 1903.

She taught in Antigo, Wisconsin, Shenandoah, Iowa, and Helena, Montana before becoming superintendent of schools in Page County, Iowa in 1906. While principal of Jefferson School in Helena, Montana, her brother, Henry Arms Field, sent a letter which asked her to come back to Page County because there was an opening. In 1906, Jessie became superintendent of Page County's 130 country schools. She was paid $33.50 a month. She bought a horse and buggy so that she could visit each school three times a year.

In 1910, she designed a three-leaf-clover pin with the letter "H" on each leaf, representing "head," "hands" and "heart." A fourth leaf for "hustle" later became "health." She was the author of Country Girl Creed and used the 3-Leaf Clover Pin as an award medal for club work. "The motto for all our clubs was: TO MAKE OUR BEST BETTER. All the club activities were meant to enrich country living. By 1912 they were called 4-H clubs, and the national 4-H organization was formed in 1914.

She organized Boys Corn Clubs and Girls Home Clubs as school teacher in 1901. When she became the Page County School Superintendent in 1906, she organized Boys Corn Clubs and Girls Home Clubs in all 130 country schools. Students developed their Head, Heart, and Hands in her 3-H Clubs that included camps, exhibitions and judging contests.

Field moved to New York City in 1912 to work for the national YMCA. She accepted a position as the secretary for the National Young Women's Christian Association. She also was the National Secretary for Rural Work in Small Towns. During this period of her career, Jessie wrote a civics textbook, The Corn Lady (1911) and A Real Country Teacher, all three which were used to train rural schoolteachers. She married Ira William Shambaugh in Redlands, California on June 9, 1917. They had a son and a daughter, William Harding Shambaugh and Ruth Shambaugh Watkins.

Jessie died in Clarinda, Iowa of pneumonia following a fall.

== Legacy ==
The Jessie Field Shambaugh Post Office Building, named that in 2021, is at 101 South 16th Street in Clarinda, Iowa.

There are now 4-H clubs nationwide.
