= Todd House (Tabor, Iowa) =

Historic house in Iowa, United States

- U.S. National Register of Historic Places
- U.S. Historic district – Contributing property
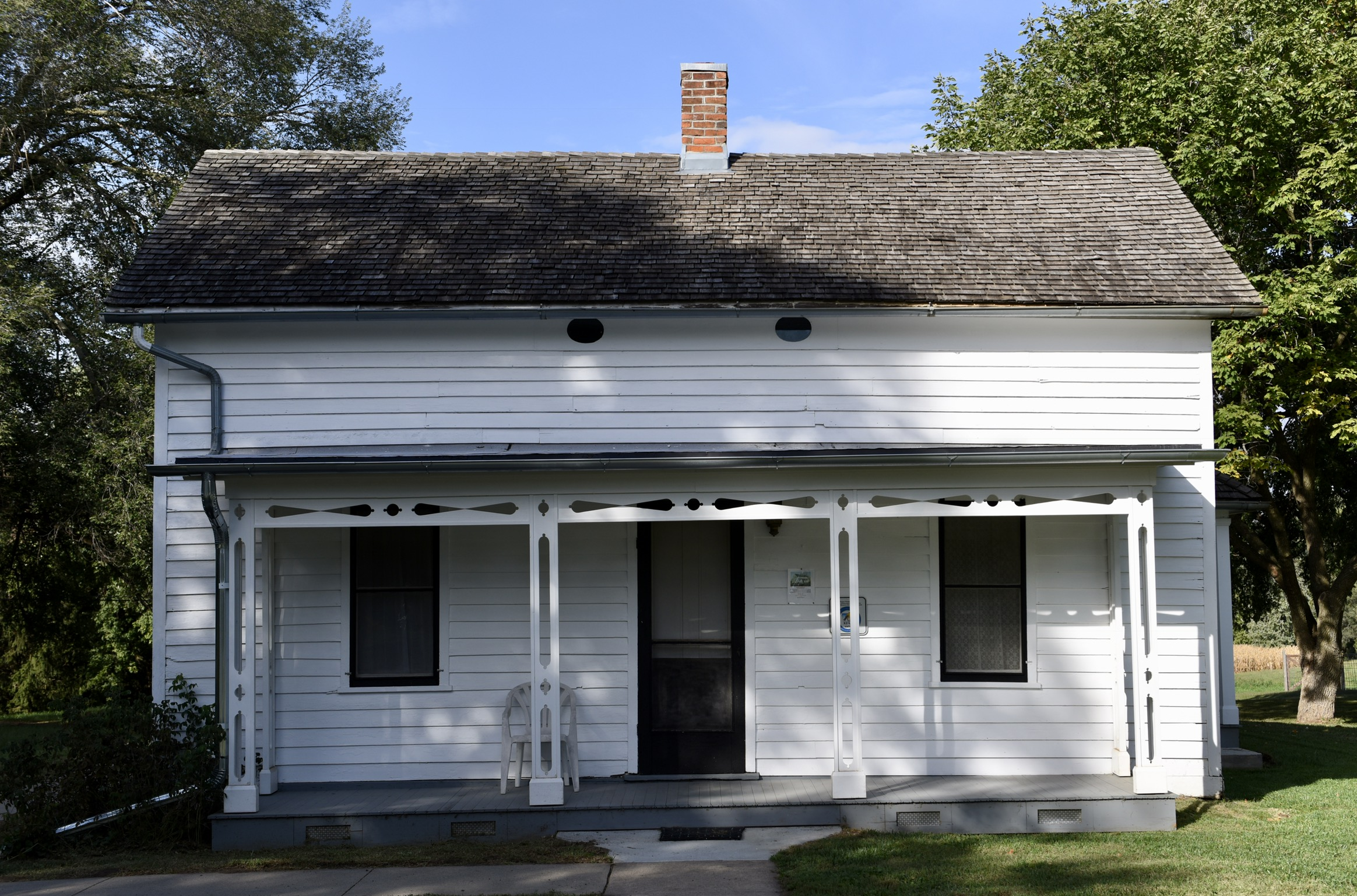

- Location within Iowa Location within the United States
- Location: Park St. Tabor, Iowa
- Coordinates: 40°53′58″N 95°40′35″W
- Area: 1.5 acres (0.61 ha)
- Built: 1853
- Architect: John Todd
- Part of: Tabor Antislavery Historic District (ID07001117)
- NRHP reference No.: 75000689
- Added to NRHP: August 15, 1975

The Todd House is a historic house museum that was the home to abolitionist and Congregationalist minister, John Todd. The house is located on Park Street in Tabor, Iowa.

It was built in 1853 around the time when Todd moved to Tabor as a co-founder of Tabor College and the town of Tabor. John Brown visited the home around the time of his raids, and the house served as a stop on the Underground Railroad prior to the Civil War. John Todd served as a model for the grandfather of the main character in the 2004 Pulitzer Prize winning book, Gilead. The house is a two-story frame clapboard structure. Todd's House was added to the National Register of Historic Places in 1975. It is currently maintained as a museum by the Tabor Historical Society.
