= Tilden Ladies' Seminary =

Coordinates: 43°38′34″N 72°18′33″W

The Tilden Ladies' Seminary, also known as the Tilden Female Seminary, was dedicated on September 19, 1855, in West Lebanon, New Hampshire, United States. The school was named after William Tilden, who was born in West Lebanon and became rich in New York City through his business, the manufacture and export of varnish. Instruction took place in a school on a hill above the Connecticut River. The four-story brick school for girls was notable in that, unlike the typical private school started by an individual and held in the founder's home, it was chartered by the legislature of New Hampshire and occupied a purpose-built building.

In the period leading up to the time of the seminary's founding, the education of young women often involved boarding schools that did little to educate young women beyond needlework, music, and other abilities meant to prepare them for life, which meant attracting a husband. Academies or seminaries such as the Tilden Ladies' Seminary were established to raise academic standards, which some did. The 1870 promotional catalog of the school explained its mission: "This Seminary aims to provide, at a moderate expense, excellent and special advantages for the finished, practical and ornamental education of Young Ladies." The school closed in 1890 due to low enrollment.

== Course of study ==
The course of study varied by the year or grade the student was in. It included arithmetic, algebra, geometry and trigonometry as the math sequence over four years; geography; natural, moral, and intellectual philosophy; physiology; logic; chemistry; astronomy; rhetoric; history (United States, civilization, England); evidence of Christianity; rhetoric; composition; and more. Students engaged in exercises in spelling, reading, and penmanship throughout their time at the seminary. They were also able to take French, Latin, or German over four years, for an extra fee. Those studying Latin were expected to finish a number of books in Latin during their time at the seminary, including Caesar, Sallust, four orations of Cicero, and six books of Virgil (the Aeneid), and there were equivalent requirements for those studying French or German. Practical and ornamental topics of study included bookkeeping and a number of optional topics: music (instrumental and vocal), perspective, drawing, pastel, oil painting, and crayoning. The 1870 catalog notes in connection with the outlined course of study for the "Department of Music, Language, etc." that "The foregoing course of Study will be pursued entire or in part, according to the circumstances of the pupil and wishes of the patron."

Moral and religious education was part of the program of study, but the description in the 1870 catalog explicitly states that "The School is religious, but in no sense sectarian. It recognizes alone the fundamental doctrines of the Gospel, the common ground of all Christian Churches." Included in the section on Moral and Religious Education is a section on health and physical development: "The young ladies are thoroughly drilled in Dr. Lewis' new Gymnastics....It can be demonstrated that the health of the family has increased fifty percent, since the introduction of Gymnastics into the School." Diplomas of the Second Degree were awarded to those completing three years of study, and those completing four years satisfactorily earned a Diploma of the First Degree. Those who studied for two years and "passed a satisfactory examination" would receive "an appropriate form of Diploma."

== Costs ==
In 1870, a full year (composed of three sessions or terms) of board and tuition was $225 for the English course, with additional costs for tuition in musical instruments, the arts, and foreign languages. Access to instruction in all topics cost $300 for board and tuition per year, with extra charges for more than the regular number of lessons. Day scholars paid $30 per year or $10 per session for the English course, $39 covered instruction with Latin.

== Enrollment ==
Many of the students who enrolled at the seminary came from beyond New England, including from the South. The Civil War, therefore, disrupted the number of enrolled students, as did the inadequate leadership of the third principal, L. H. Deane. He was followed as principal by Hiram Orcutt in 1865, whose leadership caused enrollment to grow, with students coming from as far away as California. By 1868, enrollment had grown to 75 pupils, and two wings were added onto the school building. That year, the school's name was officially changed to "Tilden Seminary", though some still called it the Tilden Ladies' Seminary or Tilden Female Seminary. Orcutt left in 1880, and enrollment once again began to decline. Public high schools were now offering young women as well as men an educational route, and young women no longer needed to enroll in a seminary or academy. The low enrollment caused the school to close in 1890. The hill on which the school stood is still known as Seminary Hill.

== Notable people ==
- Mary Elizabeth Perley (1863–?), American educator and author
