= Chautauqua Pavilion (Hastings, Nebraska) =

- U.S. National Register of Historic Places
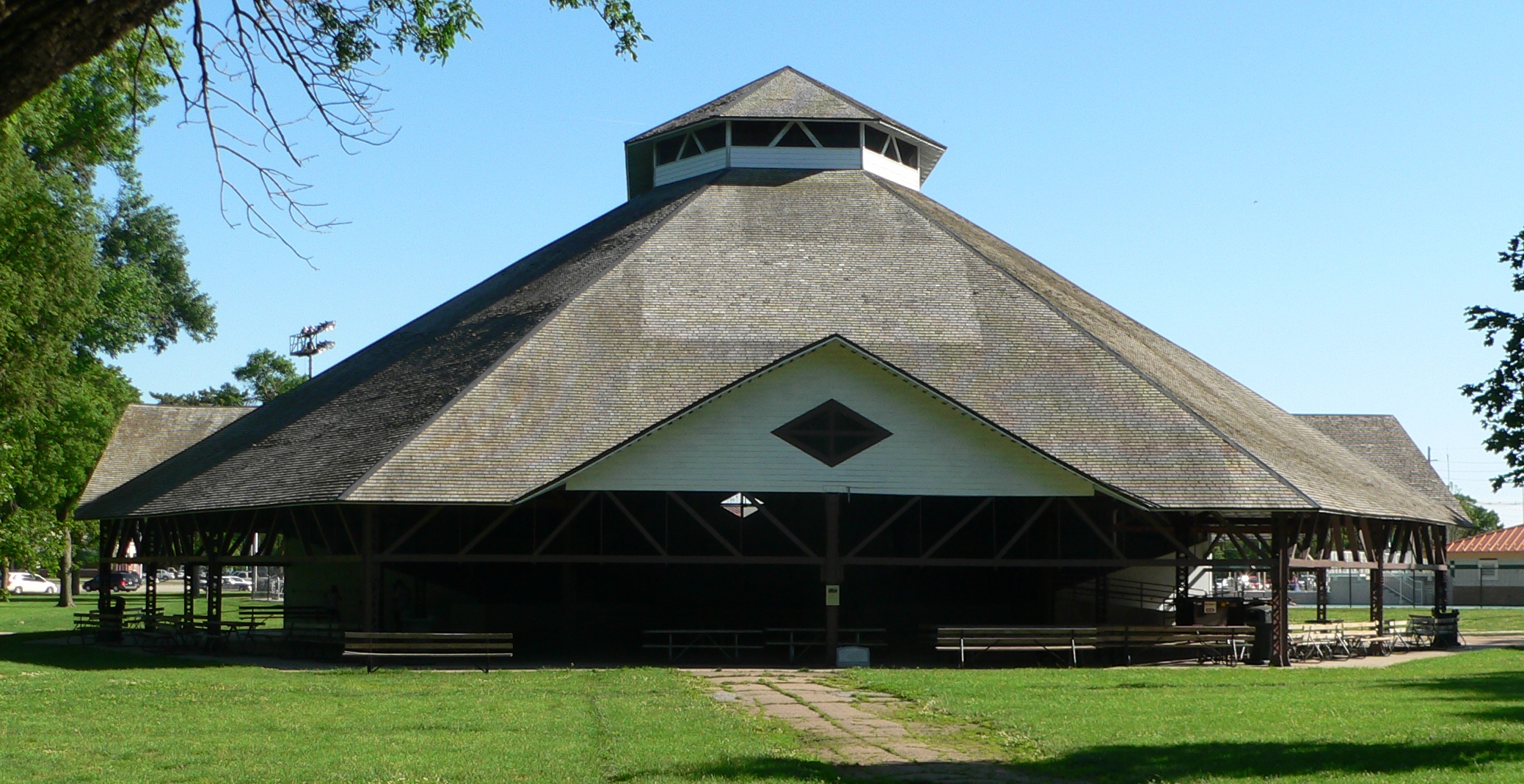

- Location within Nebraska Location within the United States
- Location: Chautauqua Park, Hastings, Nebraska
- Coordinates: 40°35′14″N 98°24′44″W
- Area: less than one acre
- Built: 1907
- NRHP reference No.: 78001692
- Added to NRHP: October 19, 1978

The Chautauqua Pavilion is an octagonal pavilion located in Chautauqua Park in Hastings, Nebraska. The pavilion was constructed in 1907 for summer Chautauqua assemblies in Hastings. According to the Historic American Engineering Record, the pavilion's design is unique; in fact, the HAER does not have a name for certain design elements used in the pavilion. The building's pyramidal roof is supported by columns along the pavilion's perimeter; a triangular truss atop the columns acts as the pavilion's superstructure. A vent at the top of the roof is supported by a Howe truss. A stage and orchestra pit are located inside the pavilion, though the majority of the space inside the pavilion is open, allowing a variety of activities to be held there. The Hastings chapter of the Chautauqua movement held independent assemblies at the pavilion until 1913, when it merged with the national movement. Hastings continued to host Chautauqua events until the 1920s, when the movement declined due to the rise of film and radio.

The pavilion was added to the National Register of Historic Places on October 19, 1978.
