= Jason and Elizabeth Baylor Rector House =

Historic house in Iowa, United States

- U.S. National Register of Historic Places
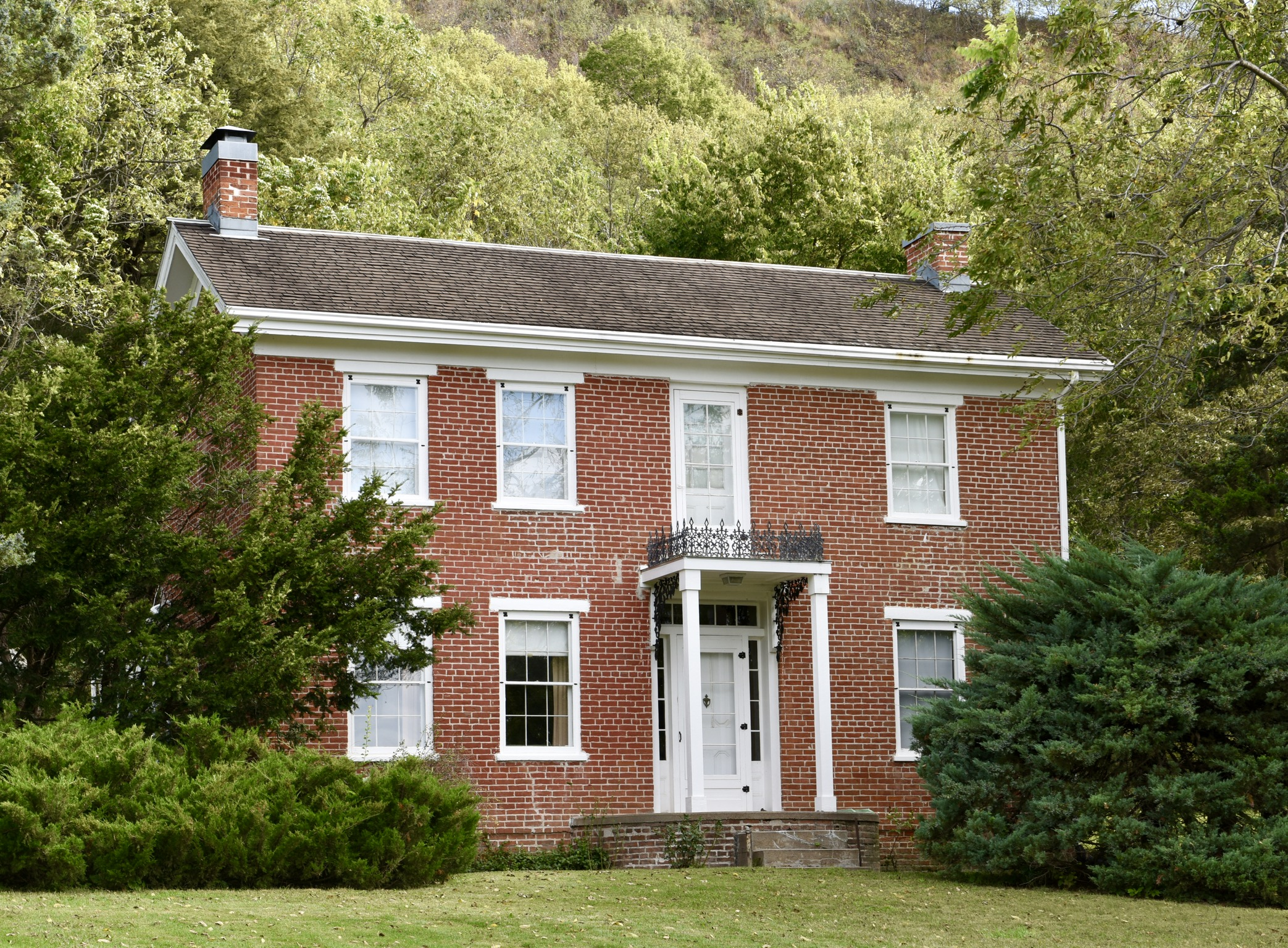

- Location within Iowa Location within the United States
- Location: 2174 Bluff Rd.
- Nearest city: Thurman, Iowa
- Coordinates: 40°43′58″N 95°42′35″W
- Area: less than one acre
- Built: 1859
- Architect: Jason Rector
- Architectural style: Greek Revival
- NRHP reference No.: 01001542
- Added to NRHP: February 4, 2002

Jason and Elizabeth Baylor Rector House is a historic building located south of Thurman, Iowa, United States. Jason Rector is a native of Indiana who moved with his father, a Methodist minister, in the late 1840s to southwest Iowa. He became a farmer and land owner. Rector returned to Indiana to marry Elizabeth Baylor. They had no children of their own, but took in several homeless children. The two-story brick Greek Revival house follows a T-plan. Both floors have three rooms. The first floor houses a living room, parlor and kitchen, and three bedrooms are located upstairs. A screened in porch and a single-story wing are located adjacent to the kitchen on the first floor. It is capped with a low-pitched gable roof. The summer kitchen on the main floor was converted into a bathroom. The house is located on an 80-acre (32 ha) farm located in the Loess Hills. It was listed on the National Register of Historic Places in 2002.
