= Hunter School =

Schoolhouse in Iowa, U.S.

- U.S. National Register of Historic Places
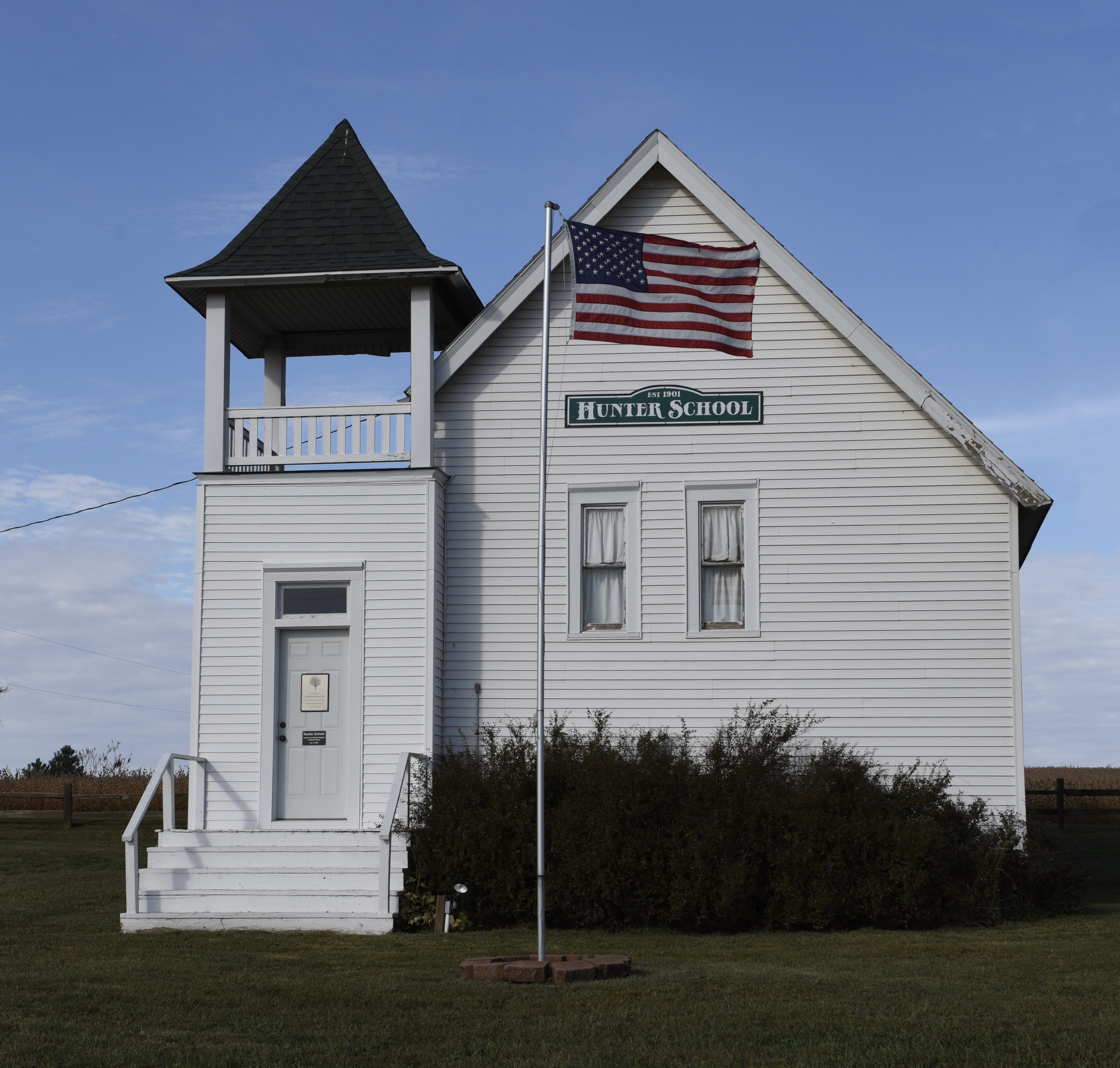

- Location within Iowa Location within the United States
- Location: Junction of U.S. Route 275 and 120th St.
- Nearest city: Tabor, Iowa
- Coordinates: 40°52′23″N 95°40′18″W
- Area: less than one acre
- Built: 1901
- Architect: G.W. Clark
- NRHP reference No.: 06001220
- Added to NRHP: January 9, 2007

Hunter School is a historic building near Tabor, Iowa, United States. The one-room schoolhouse was built in 1901. The school was named for John H. Hunter, a farmer and landowner on whose property the original school was built in 1901. Its use as a schoolhouse came to an end in 1920 when it was consolidated into the Tabor School District. The building was used as a township meeting and a polling place until 1990. Since then it has been maintained as a historical landmark. The former schoolhouse is a frame structure built on a brick foundation, and consists of a 24-by-26-foot (7.3 by 7.9 m) main block and an 8-foot (2.4 m) square bell tower-entrance. While the schoolhouse overall follows a basic plan for a one-room schoolhouse, it departs from that plan with the asymmetrically placed corner tower. It was added to the National Register of Historic Places in 2007.
