= John Todd (abolitionist) =

John Todd (November 10, 1818 – January 31, 1894) was an American Congregationalist minister, co-founder of Tabor College in Tabor, Iowa, a leading abolitionist and a conductor on the Underground Railroad.

== Background ==
John Todd was born November 10, 1818, in West Hanover, Pennsylvania. He was the second son and fifth child of Capt. James Todd and Sally Ainsworth Todd. The Todds' ancestors were Scotch Irish and Presbyterians, and Todd grew up attending a Presbyterian church. Todd was an early graduate of Oberlin College (Oberlin, Ohio) and its seminary (class of 1841 and 1844, respectively). In the 1850s, Todd moved West to help start an Oberlin-like school on the Iowa frontier. He was one of the founders of Tabor, in southwestern Iowa, and its Congregational Church, which he served as pastor for more than 30 years. He is also the basis for the abolitionist preacher and grandfather of John Ames, the main character in Marilynne Robinson's Pulitzer Prize-winning novel, Gilead (2004).

Todd's home in Tabor served not only as a station on the Underground Railroad, complete with a concealed room in which escaped slaves hid until their next ride arrived, but also as a storehouse of weapons, ammunition and other supplies for radical abolitionist John Brown.

Todd and the other residents of Tabor generally supported Brown until he (Brown) and his men in 1858 entered Missouri and forcibly freed about a dozen slaves, killing one enslaver in the process. Brown was given safe haven in Tabor, but the citizens made it clear they did not condone his actions. Brown left soon thereafter and had the weapons and supplies stored in Todd's basement shipped east. The 200 Sharps rifles included in the cache of weapons were used two years later in John Brown's raid on Harpers Ferry. But Todd had no knowledge of the use to which the weapons he had stored would be put, nor any involvement.

Todd was also a leader in the temperance movement and was a board member of Tabor College from its founding in 1866 until his death in 1894. His home in Tabor, Todd House, is listed on the National Register of Historic Places, operated as a museum by the Tabor Historical Society, and open to the public.

== See also ==
- Todd House
