= Chautauqua Pavilion (Riverton, Iowa) =

Structure in Iowa, U.S.

- U.S. National Register of Historic Places
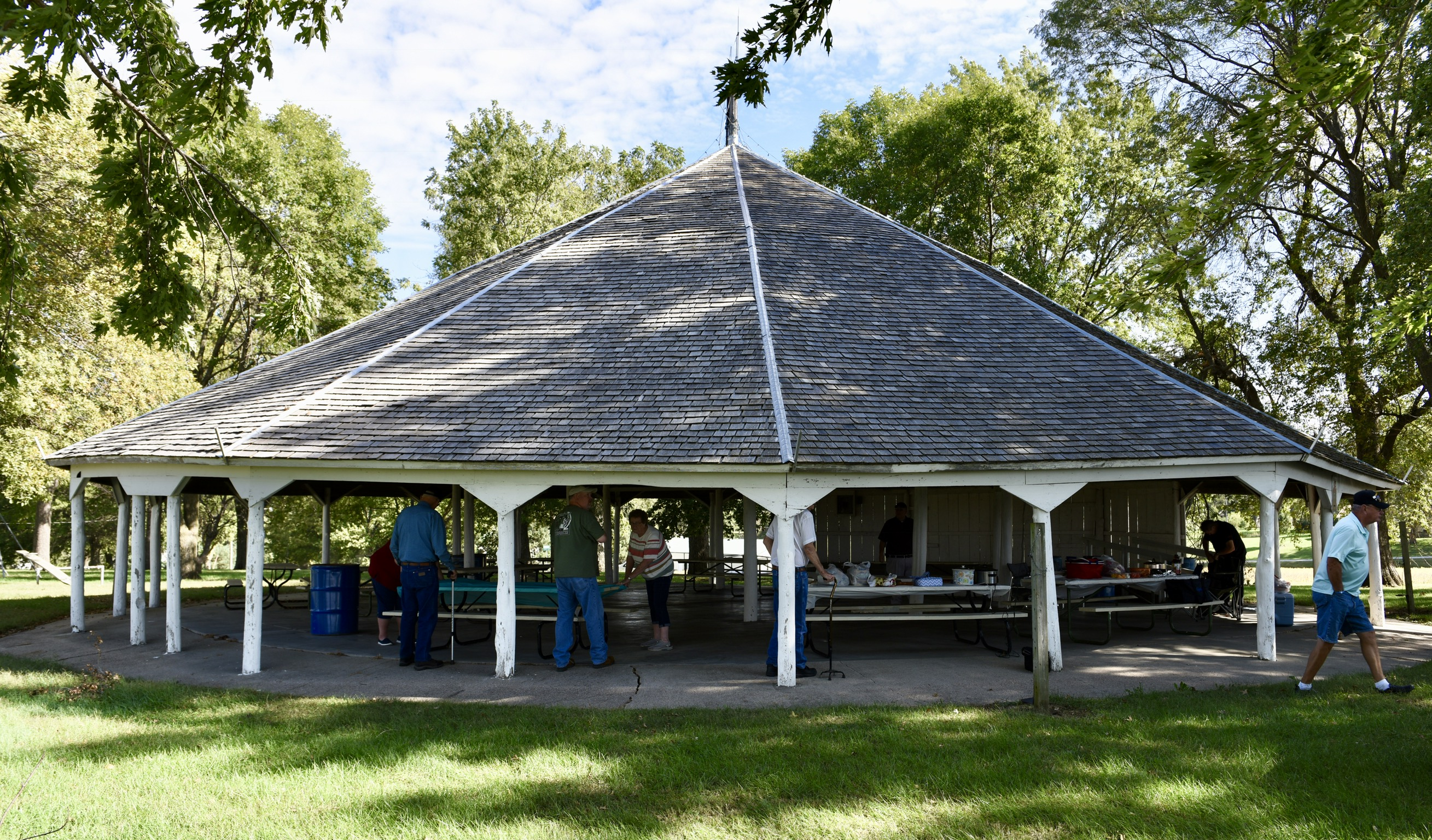

- Location within Iowa Location within the United States
- Location: City Park; Riverton, Iowa
- Coordinates: 40°40′55″N 95°34′09″W
- Area: less than one acre
- Built: 1897
- NRHP reference No.: 76000773
- Added to NRHP: October 22, 1976

The Chautauqua Pavilion is a historic structure located in City Park in Riverton, Iowa, United States. William "Coin" Harvey, a political ally of William Jennings Bryan, founded a political fraternal order known as the Patriots of America. Fremont County, Iowa was said to have the largest number of members of any county in the US in the organization. It was selected to have an experimental structure to house encampments of the Patriots. Harvey donated $500 towards its construction in the Riverton city park. Within a few years the organization died out, and the pavilion was used for summer Chautauqua shows, Sunday school and church services, school graduations and May Day observances. The 70-foot (21 m) diameter structure is 35 feet (11 m) high in the center and 9 feet (3 m) high at the eaves. It is capped with a conical-shaped roof and open on the sides. The pavilion was listed on the National Register of Historic Places in 1976.
