= Tabor College (Iowa) =

Christian college in Tabor, Iowa (1853–1927)

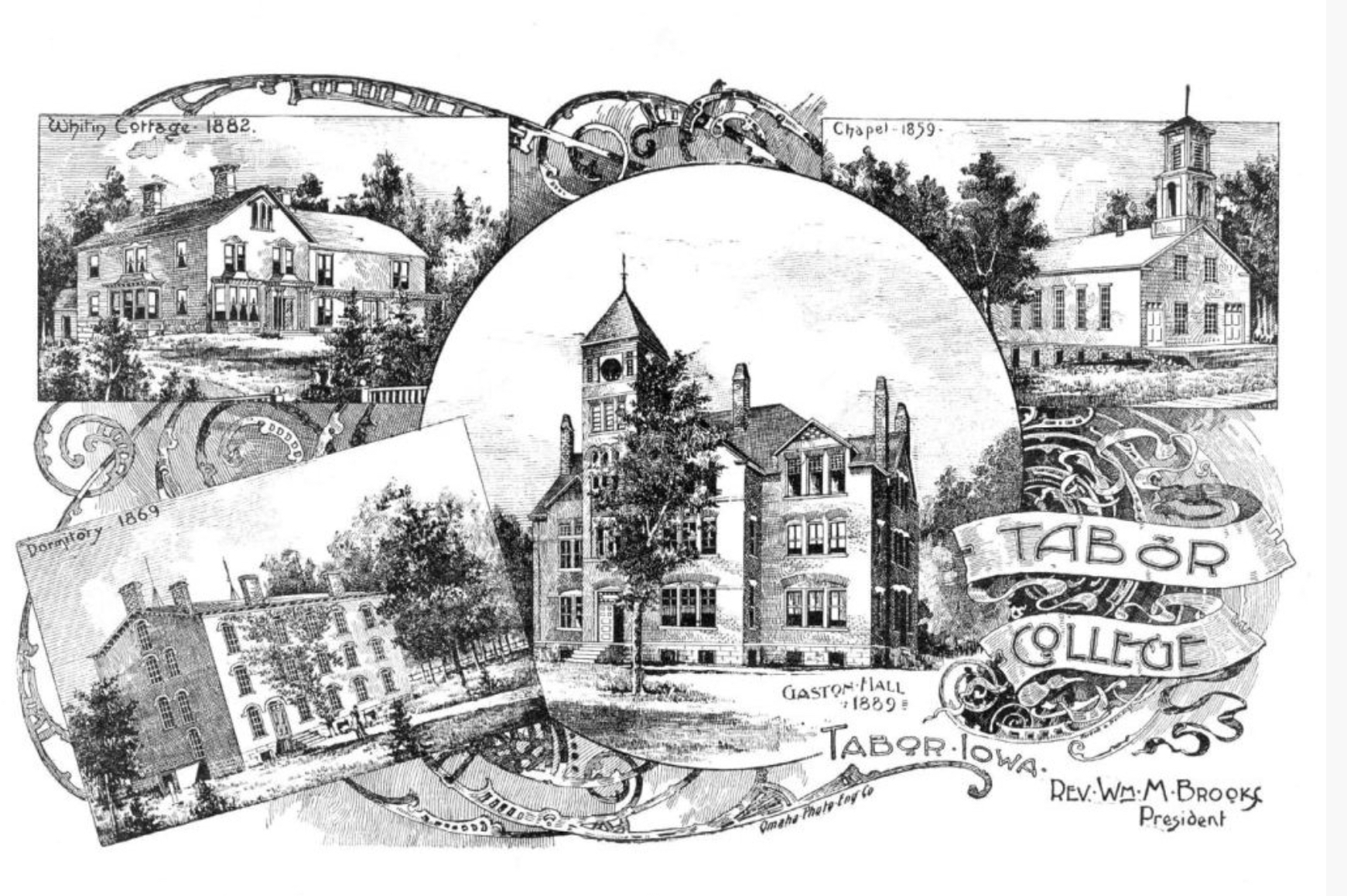
Tabor College, Iowa, about 1900

Tabor College was a Christian college in Tabor, Iowa, United States, that operated from 1853 to 1927. It is now defunct.

== History ==
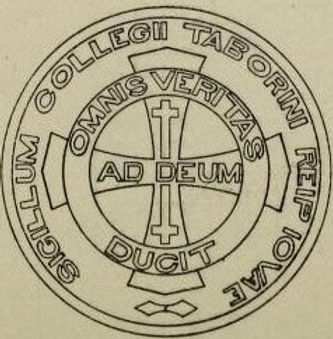
Shield of Tabor College, Iowa, with the college's motto: "Omnis veritas ducit ad Deum" ("All truth leads to God")

The school's roots date to 1852, when Deacon Samuel A. Adams, George Gaston, and Rev. John Todd came to Iowa for the purpose of establishing a Christian, egalitarian college similar to Oberlin College of Ohio, where Todd had studied. In 1853 they established the Tabor Literary Institute, at the same time founding the town of Tabor. (At the time, "literary" in a college name meant "non-religious", not a seminary; Oberlin began as the Oberlin Literary Institute.) In 1866 the institute was renamed Tabor College and began offering four-year degrees.

Students were required to "enroll in Bible class each semester", attend the church of their choice on Sunday, and participate in group Bible study at least one night a week.

38 Catalogues and Announcements of the College, from 1870 to 1924, have been digitized.

For many years the college operated the Tabor & Northern Railway, a 9-metre (30 ft) line connecting with the Wabash Railroad at Malvern.

Henry J. Steere, a philanthropist from New England, gave major donations to the school in the late nineteenth century, but after various financial struggles the school closed in 1927. After several unsuccessful attempts to attract students in the 1930s and early 1940s, such as recruiting only boys in the bottom of their high school classes, the school failed to reopen again as an educational institution. During World War II, the U.S. Government housed German P.O.W.s in the school buildings. All of the campus' buildings were eventually demolished except for Adams Hall, which is now an apartment building. The University of Iowa archives contain the student records for Tabor.

== Notable faculty and alumni ==
- James Bede, U.S. Representative from Minnesota
- Frederick William Lehmann, U.S. Solicitor General
- William H. H. Llewellyn, New Mexico State Representative
- John L. Morrison, journalist
- Mary Elizabeth Perley (1863–?), educator and author
- Jessie Field Shambaugh, educator, activist, "mother" of 4-H clubs
- John Todd, co-founder of Tabor
- Ben H. Williams, journalist and editor
- Lee Ki-poong, South Korean minister of defense
