= Tabor, Iowa =

City in Iowa, United States

Tabor
- City
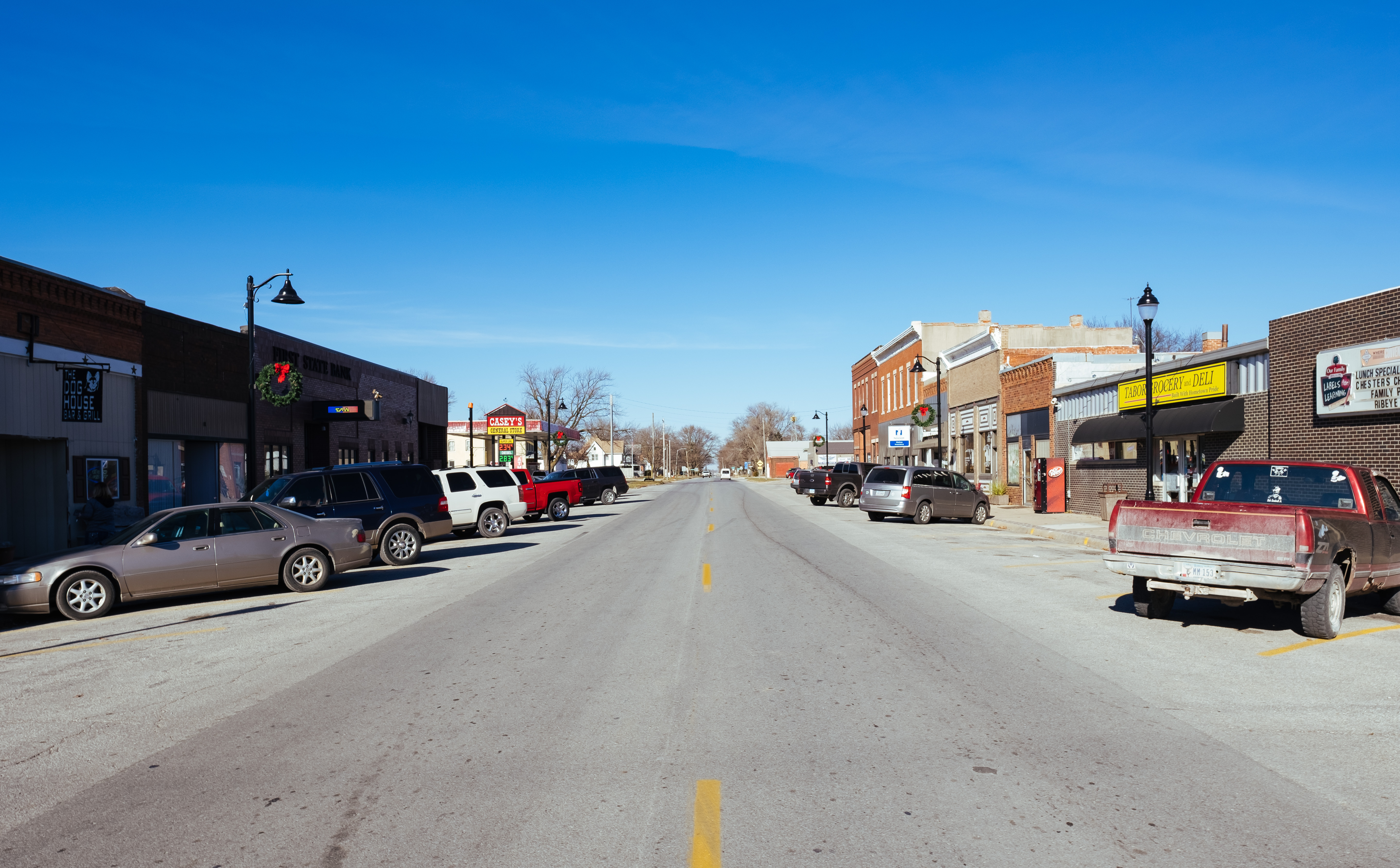
- Downtown Tabor

- Location of Tabor, Iowa
- Coordinates: 40°53′42″N 95°40′25″W
- Country: USA
- State: Iowa
- Counties: Fremont, Mills

Area
  - Total: 1.29 sq mi (3.35 km^{2})
  - Land: 1.29 sq mi (3.35 km^{2})
  - Water: 0 sq mi (0.00 km^{2})
- Elevation: 1,240 ft (380 m)

Population (2020)
  - Total: 1,014
  - Density: 785.0/sq mi (303.08/km^{2})
- Time zone: UTC-6 (Central (CST))
  - Summer (DST): UTC-5 (CDT)
- ZIP code: 51653
- Area code: 712
- FIPS code: 19-76935
- GNIS feature ID: 468776
- Website: www.taboriowa.us

Tabor is a city in Fremont County and extends northward into Mills County in the U.S. state of Iowa. The population was 1,014 at the time of the 2020 census.

== Geography ==
According to the United States Census Bureau, the city has a total area of 1.29 square miles (3.34 km^{2}), all land.

== History ==
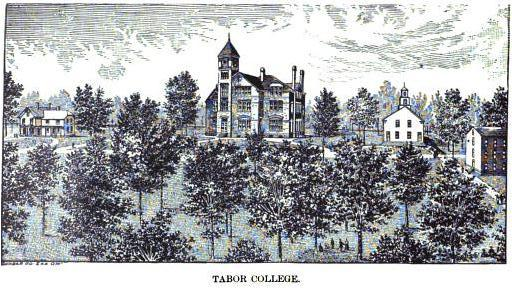
Tabor College, c. 1893

In 1852 the city of Tabor was founded by "a few families from Oberlin, Ohio, almost all of them Congregationalists," "generous people, early settlers from New England and Ohio who had brought with them Puritan ideas of religion, and Sumner's and Phillips' and Garrison's ideas of freedom." Among them were the Christian clergymen George Gaston, Samuel A. Adams, and Rev. John Todd, and their families. They chose to settle in what is now Tabor in order to found a Christian college, which eventually became Tabor College. The founders were impressed with this high location and mutually selected the name "Tabor" after the Biblical name of Mount Tabor, a mountain near Nazareth, the town of Jesus' childhood.

The town was the home of many abolitionists; Rev. Todd, co-founder of Tabor College, was a "conductor" on the Underground Railroad. The residents of Tabor held monthly abolitionist prayer meetings, and helped runaway slaves whenever they could.

During the Bleeding Kansas period (1854–1860), Tabor was on a route established to enable anti-slavery partisans to reach Kansas without needing to go through the slave state of Missouri. A shipment of 200 Sharps rifles, sent from Boston for use in Kansas by free-state partisans, were stored there (in John Todd's barn). In 1857–1858 abolitionist John Brown spent the winter in Tabor, assembling and training men for his raid on Harpers Ferry.

Tabor College was located in the city from 1853 until 1927, when it closed for financial reasons. The college's buildings housed German prisoners of war during World War II.

The Tabor & Northern Railway, a 9-mile line connecting with the Wabash Railroad at Malvern, operated from 1889 to 1934. It was operated by the college.

== Demographics ==
Historical populations
Year	Pop.	±%
1870	310	—
1880	320	+3.2%
1890	503	+57.2%
1900	934	+85.7%
1910	909	−2.7%
1920	1,186	+30.5%
1930	1,017	−14.2%
1940	976	−4.0%
1950	869	−11.0%
1960	909	+4.6%
1970	957	+5.3%
1980	1,088	+13.7%
1990	994	−8.6%
2000	993	−0.1%
2010	1,040	+4.7%
2020	1,014	−2.5%
Source:"U.S. Census website". United States Census Bureau. and Iowa Data Center; Source: U.S. Decennial Census

=== 2020 census ===
As of the 2020 census, Tabor had a population of 1,014, with 386 households and 271 families residing in the city.

The population density was 785.0 inhabitants per square mile (303.1/km^{2}). There were 418 housing units at an average density of 323.6 per square mile (124.9/km^{2}). Of all housing units, 7.7% were vacant; the homeowner vacancy rate was 3.4% and the rental vacancy rate was 6.9%.

Of the 386 households, 35.8% had children under the age of 18 living with them, 51.8% were married-couple households, 7.8% were cohabiting-couple households, 25.4% had a female householder with no spouse or partner present, and 15.0% had a male householder with no spouse or partner present. Non-families made up 29.8% of all households; 24.6% of households were made up of individuals, and 12.4% had someone living alone who was 65 years old or older.

The median age in the city was 41.1 years. 26.6% of residents were under the age of 18. By broader age distribution, 29.3% of residents were under age 20, 3.5% were from 20 to 24, 21.9% were from 25 to 44, 23.5% were from 45 to 64, and 21.9% were age 65 or older. The gender makeup of the city was 47.6% male and 52.4% female. For every 100 females, there were 91.0 males, and for every 100 females age 18 and over there were 90.3 males.

0.0% of residents lived in urban areas, while 100.0% lived in rural areas.

Racial composition as of the 2020 census
Race	Number	Percent
White	948	93.5%
Black or African American	4	0.4%
American Indian and Alaska Native	0	0.0%
Asian	3	0.3%
Native Hawaiian and Other Pacific Islander	3	0.3%
Some other race	15	1.5%
Two or more races	41	4.0%
Hispanic or Latino (of any race)	23	2.3%

=== 2010 census ===
At the 2010 census, there were 1,040 people, 418 households and 272 families living in the city. The population density was 806.2 per square mile (311.3/km^{2}). There were 451 housing units at an average density of 349.6 per square mile (135.0/km^{2}). The racial makeup was 98.5% White, 0.7% African American, 0.3% Asian, 0.1% from other races, and 0.5% from two or more races. Hispanic or Latino of any race were 2.0% of the population.

There were 418 households, of which 29.9% had children under the age of 18 living with them, 50.2% were married couples living together, 10.0% had a female householder with no husband present, 4.8% had a male householder with no wife present, and 34.9% were non-families. 31.6% of all households were made up of individuals, and 15% had someone living alone who was 65 years of age or older. The average household size was 2.34 and the average family size was 2.95.

The median age was 44.3 years. 23.2% of residents were under the age of 18; 6.2% were between the ages of 18 and 24; 21.3% were from 25 to 44; 27.1% were from 45 to 64; and 22.2% were 65 years of age or older. The gender makeup of the city was 48.3% male and 51.7% female.

=== 2000 census ===
At the 2000 census, there were 993 people, 387 households and 267 families living in the city. The population density was 777.4 inhabitants per square mile (300.2/km^{2}). There were 416 housing units at an average density of 325.7 per square mile (125.8/km^{2}). The racial makeup was 99.60% White, 0.10% Asian, and 0.30% from two or more races. 0.81% of the population was Hispanic or Latino of any race.

There were 387 households, of which 30.5% had children under the age of 18 living with them, 55.6% were married couples living together, 11.6% had a female householder with no husband present, and 31.0% were non-families. 28.7% of all households were made up of individuals, and 20.2% had someone living alone who was 65 or older. The average household size was 2.38 and the average family size was 2.91.

24.1% of the population were under the age of 18, 5.2% from 18 to 24, 22.6% from 25 to 44, 23.0% from 45 to 64, and 25.2% who were 65 years of age or older. The median age was 44 years. For every 100 females, there were 84.6 males. For every 100 females age 18 and over, there were 74.1 males.

The median household income was $36,750 and the median family income was $50,000. Males had a median income of $31,042 and females $23,068. The per capita income was $16,979. About 3.7% of families and 7.9% of the population were below the poverty line, including 11.5% of those under age 18 and 9.0% of those age 65 or over.

== Education ==
Fremont–Mills Community School District operates public schools.

== National Historic Places and attractions ==
- Todd House (1853), home of abolitionist John Todd and Underground Railroad station, now a museum
- Hunter School (1901), one room school house
- Tabor Antislavery Historic District (1853), series of abolitionist related buildings and places

== Cultural references ==
The town of Gilead, in Marilynne Robinson's Gilead, is a fictionalized version of Tabor.

== See also ==
- Springdale, Iowa
