= Marvin Dauner =

American politician

Marvin K. Dauner
- Born: December 4, 1927; Keene Township, Clay County, Minnesota
- Died: December 18, 2010 (aged 83); Ulen, Minnesota
- Occupations: Farmer, Politician
- Political party: Democratic–Farmer–Labor

Marvin K. Dauner (December 4, 1927 – December 18, 2010) was an American farmer and politician.

Dauner was born in Keene Township, Clay County, Minnesota. Dauner lived in Hawley, Minnesota with his wife and family and was a farmer. Dauner served on the Hitterdal, Minnesota School Board from 1957 to 1966 and on the Clay County Commission from 1974 to 1986. He was a Democrat. Dauner served in the Minnesota House of Representatives from 1987 to 1996. He died at the Viking Manor Nursing Home in Ulen, Minnesota. He was a Lutheran.
