= Oakport =

Oakport may refer to a community in the United States:

- Oakport, Minnesota
- Oakport Township, Clay County, Minnesota
