= Merlyn Orville Valan =

American politician (1926–2010)

Member of the Minnesota House of Representatives from the 9B district
- In office January 3, 1979 – January 5, 1987

Personal details
- Born: October 27, 1926 Kurtz Township, Clay County, Minnesota, U.S.
- Died: December 15, 2010 (aged 84) Moorhead, Minnesota, U.S.
- Party: Independent-Republican
- Spouse: Shirlee Henderson Clausen (m. 1954)
- Children: 4
- Education: North Dakota State College of Science
- Profession: Politician, farmer

Military service
- Allegiance: United States
- Branch/service: United States Navy

Merlyn Orville Valan (October 27, 1926 – December 15, 2010) was an American politician and farmer.

Valan was born in Kurtz Township, Clay County, Minnesota. He graduated from Comstock High School in Comstock, Minnesota, in 1945. Valan also went to North Dakota State College of Science in Wahpeton, North Dakota. Valan served in the United States Navy and was stationed in Guam. He lived in Moorhead, Minnesota with his wife and family and was a farmer. Valan worked for the United States Department of Agriculture and for the Minnesota Department of Agriculture. Valan served as the chief clerk for the Minnesota Senate. Valan then served in the Minnesota House of Representatives from 1979 to 1986 and was a Republican. Valan died at Eventide Lutheran Home in Moorhead, Minnesota.
