= Elbow Lake, Minnesota =

Elbow Lake is the name of some places in the U.S. state of Minnesota:

- Elbow Lake, Becker County, Minnesota
- Elbow Lake, Grant County, Minnesota
