= Klingensmith =

Klingensmith is a surname. Notable people with the surname include:

- John Klingensmith Jr. (1786–1854), American politician
- Florence Klingensmith (1904–1933), American aviator
