= Georgetown Township =

Georgetown Township may refer to the following places in the United States:

- Georgetown Township, Vermilion County, Illinois
- Georgetown Township, Floyd County, Indiana
- Georgetown Township, Michigan
- Georgetown Township, Clay County, Minnesota
