= Kragnes, Minnesota =

Unincorporated community in Minnesota, United States

Kragnes
- Unincorporated community
- Location within Minnesota Location within the United States
- Coordinates: 46°59′18″N 96°45′06″W
- Country: United States
- State: Minnesota
- County: Clay
- Elevation: 896 ft (273 m)
- Time zone: UTC-6 (Central (CST))
  - Summer (DST): UTC-5 (CDT)
- Area code: 218
- GNIS feature ID: 646243

Kragnes is an unincorporated community in Kragnes Township, Clay County, Minnesota, United States.
