= Goose Prairie =

Goose Prairie may refer to:

- Goose Prairie Township, Clay County, Minnesota
- Goose Prairie, Washington, unincorporated community in Yakima County, Washington
