= Muskoda, Minnesota =

Ghost town in Hawley Township, Minnesota, US

Coordinates: 46°51′42″N 96°24′24″W

Muskoda is a ghost town in section 7 of Hawley Township in Clay County, Minnesota, United States.

== History ==
Muskoda received its name from the Ojibwa word Mashkode, which according to Baraga means "a meadow or tract of grassland, a large prairie." The townsite was originally on a line of the Northern Pacific Railroad until that railroad moved its line to a more gradual grade in 1909, leaving Muskoda about one half mile off the new line. The town had a post office from 1873 until 1930, and also at one time had a general store, a grain elevator, and a potato warehouse. Little trace of the town remains today.
