= Finkle, Minnesota =

Unincorporated community in Minnesota, United States

Finkle
- Unincorporated community
- Location within Minnesota Location within the United States
- Coordinates: 46°48′50″N 96°44′50″W
- Country: United States
- State: Minnesota
- County: Clay
- Elevation: 912 ft (278 m)
- Time zone: UTC-6 (Central (CST))
  - Summer (DST): UTC-5 (CDT)
- Area code: 218
- GNIS feature ID: 654704

Finkle is an unincorporated community in Clay County, in the U.S. state of Minnesota.

== History ==
The community was named for Henry G. Finkle, a pioneer merchant.
