= Flowing =

Flowing may refer to:

- Fluid dynamics, a subdiscipline of fluid mechanics
- Flowing Township, Clay County, Minnesota
- Flowing (1956 film), a Japanese drama film
- Flowing (2022 film), an Italian-Belgian horror film
- "Flowing" (song), song by 311, 1992

== See also ==
- Flow (disambiguation)
