= Rollag, Minnesota =

Unincorporated community in Minnesota, United States

Rollag
- Unincorporated community
- Location within Minnesota Location within the United States
- Coordinates: 46°44′24″N 96°14′17″W
- Country: United States
- State: Minnesota
- County: Clay
- Elevation: 1,368 ft (417 m)
- Time zone: UTC-6 (Central (CST))
  - Summer (DST): UTC-5 (CDT)
- Area code: 218
- GNIS feature ID: 650230

Rollag is an unincorporated community in Parke Township, Minnesota, United States. The community is located northeast of Barnesville and south of Hawley on Minnesota State Highway 32.

The living museum WMSTR is located in the community.
