= Alliance Township, Clay County, Minnesota =

Township in Minnesota, United States

Alliance Township
- Township
- Location of Alliance Township, within Clay County, Minnesota

- Location within the state of Minnesota Alliance Township (the United States)
- Coordinates: 46°40′34″N 96°36′20″W
- Country: United States
- State: Minnesota
- County: Clay

Area
  - Total: 36.3 sq mi (94.1 km^{2})
  - Land: 36.3 sq mi (94.1 km^{2})
  - Water: 0 sq mi (0.0 km^{2})
- Elevation: 935 ft (285 m)

Population (2020)
  - Total: 203
  - Density: 5.59/sq mi (2.16/km^{2})
- Time zone: UTC-6 (Central (CST))
  - Summer (DST): UTC-5 (CDT)
- FIPS code: 27-01054
- GNIS feature ID: 0663415

Alliance Township is a township in Clay County, Minnesota, United States. The population was 203 at the 2020 census.

== History ==
Alliance Township was named after the Farmers' Alliance, a 19th-century economic movement.

== Geography ==
According to the United States Census Bureau, the township has a total area of 36.3 square miles (94 km^{2}), all land.

== Demographics ==
As of the census of 2000, there were 246 people, 95 households, and 77 families residing in the township. The population density was 6.8 inhabitants per square mile (2.6/km^{2}). There were 106 housing units at an average density of 2.9 per square mile (1.1/km^{2}). The racial makeup of the township was 96.34% White, 0.41% African American, 2.44% Native American, and 0.81% from two or more races. Hispanic or Latino of any race were 0.41% of the population.

There were 95 households, out of which 30.5% had children under the age of 18 living with them, 75.8% were married couples living together, 2.1% had a female householder with no husband present, and 18.9% were non-families. 15.8% of all households were made up of individuals, and 3.2% had someone living alone who was 65 years of age or older. The average household size was 2.59 and the average family size was 2.92.

In the township the population was spread out, with 24.8% under the age of 18, 3.7% from 18 to 24, 29.3% from 25 to 44, 24.8% from 45 to 64, and 17.5% who were 65 years of age or older. The median age was 41 years. For every 100 females, there were 113.9 males. For every 100 females age 18 and over, there were 117.6 males.

The median income for a household in the township was $45,000, and the median income for a family was $51,563. Males had a median income of $33,125 versus $31,667 for females. The per capita income for the township was $17,867. About 5.5% of families and 4.8% of the population were below the poverty line, including none of those under the age of eighteen and 11.1% of those sixty five or over.
