= Felton, Minnesota =

City in Minnesota, United States

Felton
- City
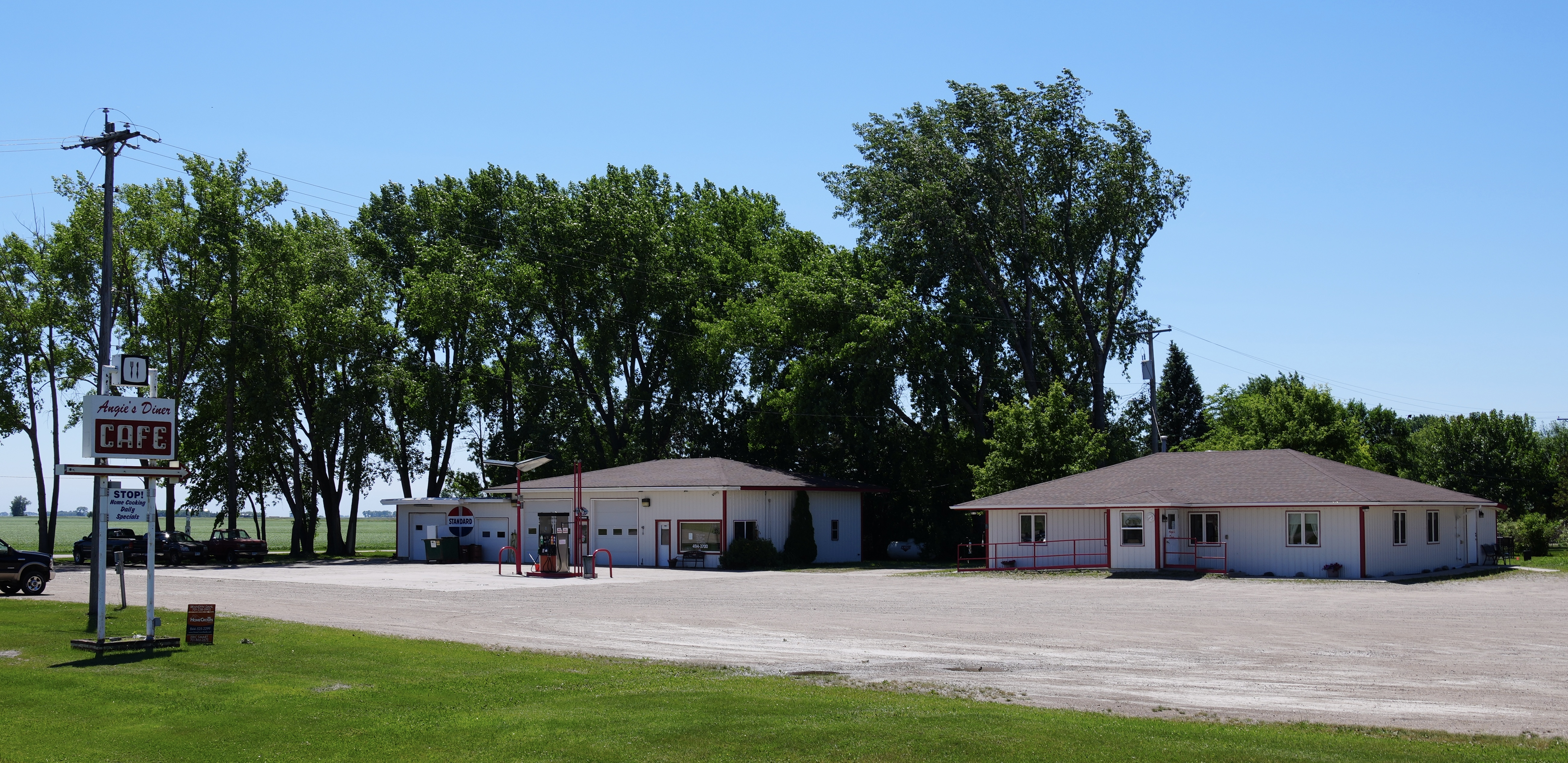
- Motto: "Best Kept Secret in Minnesota...Welcome Home!"
- Location of Felton, Minnesota
- Coordinates: 47°04′30″N 96°30′16″W
- Country: United States
- State: Minnesota
- County: Clay

Area
  - Total: 1.02 sq mi (2.63 km^{2})
  - Land: 1.02 sq mi (2.63 km^{2})
  - Water: 0 sq mi (0.00 km^{2})
- Elevation: 912 ft (278 m)

Population (2020)
  - Total: 177
  - Estimate (2021): 173
  - Density: 174/sq mi (67.3/km^{2})
- Time zone: UTC-6 (CST)
  - Summer (DST): UTC-5 (CDT)
- ZIP code: 56536
- Area code: 218
- FIPS code: 27-20834
- GNIS feature ID: 2394755
- Website: cityoffelton.com

Felton is a city in Clay County, Minnesota, United States. The population was 177 at the 2020 census.

== Geography ==
According to the United States Census Bureau, the city has a total area of 1.03 square miles (2.67 km^{2}), all land.

Minnesota State Highway 9 serves as a main route in the community.

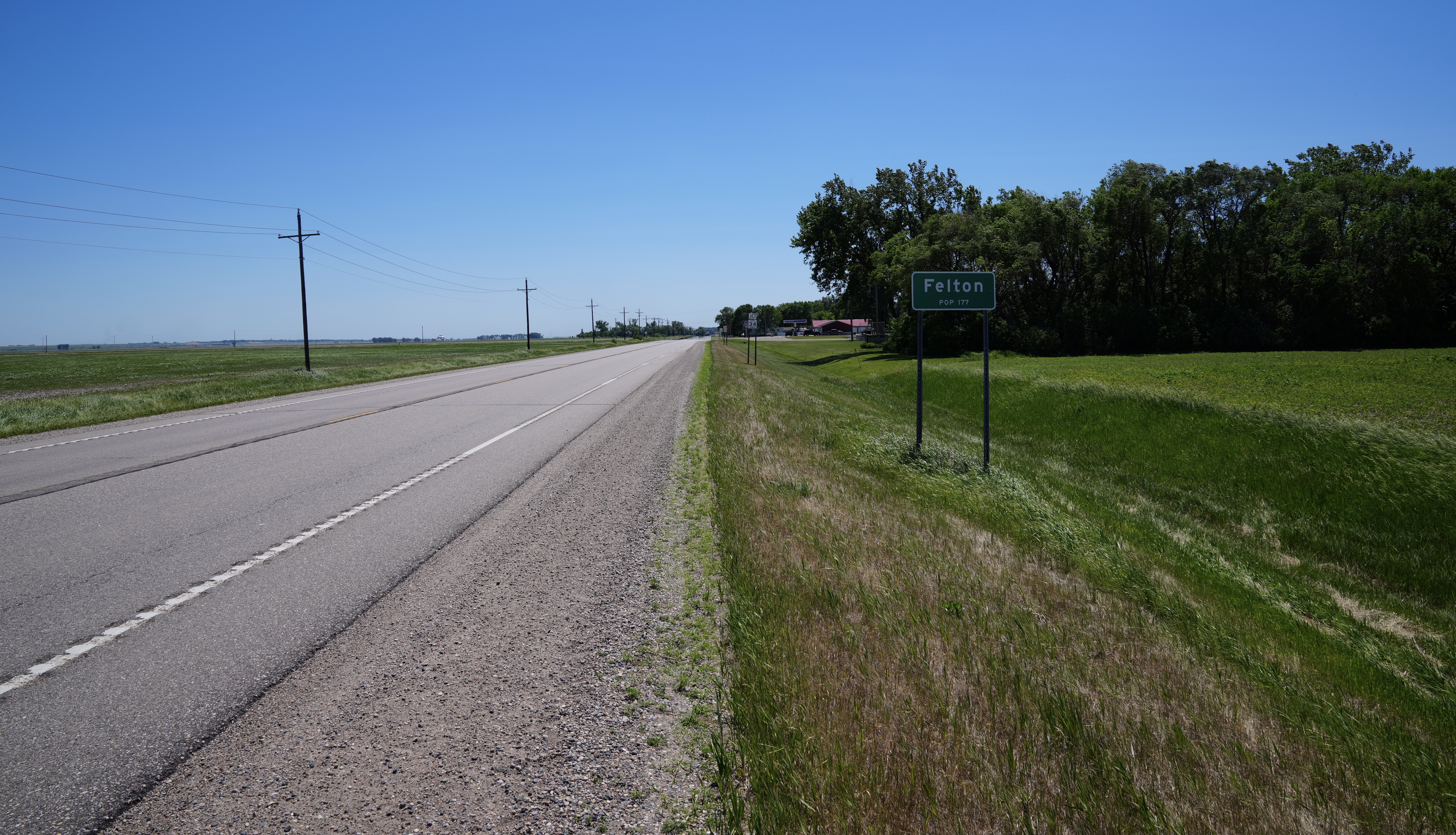
Sign for Felton on MN 9

== Demographics ==
Historical population
Census	Pop.	Note	%±
1910	149		—
1920	184		23.5%
1930	137		−25.5%
1940	200		46.0%
1950	258		29.0%
1960	201		−22.1%
1970	232		15.4%
1980	264		13.8%
1990	211		−20.1%
2000	216		2.4%
2010	177		−18.1%
2020	177		0.0%
2021 (est.)	173		−2.3%
U.S. Decennial Census; 2020 Census

=== 2010 census ===
As of the census of 2010, there were 177 people, 78 households, and 44 families living in the city. The population density was 171.8 inhabitants per square mile (66.3/km^{2}). There were 93 housing units at an average density of 90.3 per square mile (34.9/km^{2}). The racial makeup of the city was 98.9% White and 1.1% Asian. Hispanic or Latino of any race were 2.8% of the population.

There were 78 households, of which 26.9% had children under the age of 18 living with them, 43.6% were married couples living together, 10.3% had a female householder with no husband present, 2.6% had a male householder with no wife present, and 43.6% were non-families. 37.2% of all households were made up of individuals, and 11.5% had someone living alone who was 65 years of age or older. The average household size was 2.27 and the average family size was 3.05.

The median age in the city was 40.8 years. 22% of residents were under the age of 18; 9.1% were between the ages of 18 and 24; 25.4% were from 25 to 44; 32.8% were from 45 to 64; and 10.7% were 65 years of age or older. The gender makeup of the city was 52.0% male and 48.0% female.

=== 2000 census ===
As of the census of 2000, there were 216 people, 91 households, and 56 families living in the city. The population density was 211.0 inhabitants per square mile (81.5/km^{2}). There were 97 housing units at an average density of 94.8 per square mile (36.6/km^{2}). The racial makeup of the city was 97.22% White, 0% Asian, 1.85% from other races, and 0.46% from two or more races. Hispanic or Latino of any race were 5.09% of the population.

There were 91 households, out of which 31.9% had children under the age of 18 living with them, 49.5% were married couples living together, 9.9% had a female householder with no husband present, and 37.4% were non-families. 33.0% of all households were made up of individuals, and 13.2% had someone living alone who was 65 years of age or older. The average household size was 2.37 and the average family size was 3.12.

In the city, the population was spread out, with 31.5% under the age of 18, 4.2% from 18 to 24, 27.3% from 25 to 44, 24.1% from 45 to 64, and 13.0% who were 65 years of age or older. The median age was 35 years. For every 100 females, there were 92.9 males. For every 100 females age 18 and over, there were 102.7 males.

The median income for a household in the city was $26,477, and the median income for a family was $40,833. Males had a median income of $28,750 versus $18,750 for females. The per capita income for the city was $15,321. About 10.3% of families and 16.9% of the population were below the poverty line, including 26.3% of those under the age of eighteen and 12.8% of those 65 or over.
