= Florence Klingensmith =

American aviator

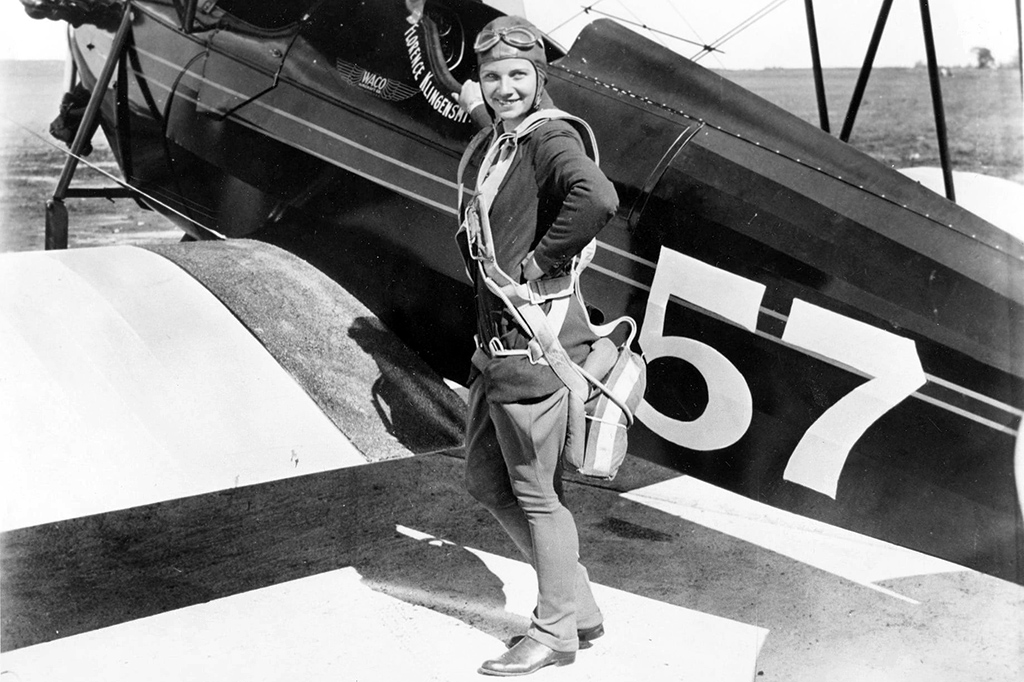
- Born: September 3, 1904; Oakport Township, Minnesota, US
- Died: September 4, 1933 (aged 29); Northfield Township, Illinois, US
- Occupation: Aviator
- Spouse: Charles Klingensmith (m. 1927)
- Parents: Gustave Gunderson; Florence Parker

Florence Edith Klingensmith (born Florence Edith Gunderson; September 3, 1904 – September 4, 1933) was an American aviator of the Golden Age of Air Racing. She was also a founding member of the Ninety-Nines, a women's pilot group. She was one of the first women to participate in air races with men. She died in an accident during the Frank Phillips Trophy Race at the 1933 International Air Races in Chicago, Illinois.

== Life ==
Florence Edith Gunderson was born September 3, 1904, to Gustave and Florence (Parker) Gunderson on their small farm in Oakport Township, Minnesota. She was baptized in the Oak Mound Congregational Church and attended the Oak Mound Consolidated School in Kragnes Township with her sister Myrtle and brothers George and Roy. Her father "Gust" worked at Oak Mound School as a janitor and school bus driver and was the clerk of Oak Mound Church. The family moved to Moorhead, Minnesota around 1918, where the daredevil Florence took up riding motorcycles quickly. She met Charles Klingensmith and they married on June 25, 1927, but within a year and a half the two had split.

In August 1927, Charles Lindbergh visited Fargo, North Dakota where she was living at the time, inspiring Klingensmith to take flying lessons. In 1928, she attended Hanson Auto and Electrical School in Fargo. That summer, she agreed to be a skydiver in return for flight lessons from Edwin Mead Canfield. Her first jump left her unconscious, but this did not deter her.

Over that winter, Klingensmith went door to door to persuade local business men to fund the purchase of a plane. In return, Klingensmith would promote Fargo and carry advertisements at fairs, flying meets, and air races. Her persistence paid off. As Fargo laundry owner William T. Lee said, "If you're willing to risk your neck, I'll risk my money." He and other local business owners put up $3,000 to purchase a Monocoupe. She picked it up and flew it back to Fargo's Hector Field, where she was working as a mechanics' apprentice, and christened it "Miss Fargo." In June 1929 she became the first licensed woman pilot in North Dakota. That summer she barnstormed county fairs, worked as operations manager at Hector, and flew in her first race, where she took fourth place.

On April 19, 1930, she set the woman's record for inside loops with 143 loops. Unfortunately, no National Aeronautics Association members were present to make it official. Laura Ingalls later raised her loop record to 980. On June 22, 1931, before more than 50,000 spectators (and NAA officials), Klingensmith took off from Wold Chamberlain Field at Minneapolis, Minnesota. Four and one-half hours later she landed, "a trifle groggy and gagged by gas fumes," with a verified record of 1,078 loops.

At the 1931 National Air Races in Cleveland, Ohio, she won four woman-only events and claimed $4,200 in prize money. At the 1932 Nationals she won the most coveted prize in women's aviation, the Amelia Earhart Trophy, presented by Amelia Earhart herself and winning the grand prize of an Essex Terraplane automobile.

In 1932, she came second in the Shell Speed Dash in a Monocoupe.

== 1933 International Air Races ==
In 1933, Klingensmith was the first woman to enter the $10,000 Frank Phillips Trophy Race at the International Air Races in Chicago, Illinois. The Phillips was a 100-mile (160 km), 12 lap pylons race and was open to planes with no limits on engine size. This race was the main event at the Nationals that year.

Klingensmith flew a red Gee Bee Model Y Senior Sportster NR718Y, owned by Arthur Knapp of Jackson, Michigan. The fabric-covered craft's original 220 horsepower (164 kW) Lycoming R-680 engine had been replaced with a 670 hp (500 kW) Wright Whirlwind. Late in the afternoon of September 4, one day after her twenty-ninth birthday, Klingensmith was flying in fourth place ahead of four male fliers, averaging over 200 miles per hour (320 km/h) through the first eight laps. As she was passing the grand stands, a bit of red fabric fluttered down from the fuselage. The stresses of the race were apparently too much for the overpowered light craft. Klingensmith immediately veered off the course and flew steady and level straight south to a plowed field a couple of miles away in Northfield Township. Suddenly, the plane nosed over into the ground from about 350 feet (110 m) up. Klingensmith died instantly, though she had attempted to bail out. Her parachute was found tangled in the fuselage. Organizers used Klingensmith's death as an excuse to bar women from the Air Races.

Klingensmith's body was shipped back to Minnesota for the funeral. The businessmen who had bankrolled Klingensmith's first plane served as pallbearers and her funeral was held in the First Presbyterian Church of Fargo. She was interred in the Gunderson family lot in Oak Mound Cemetery, Kragnes Township, a few miles from where she was born.

In June 2015, the local Oak Mound 4-H Club erected a monument on Klingensmith's grave in Oak Mound Cemetery, and it was dedicated during a ceremony on June 14, 2015. The completed monument consists of a brick pillar with a model of a red Gee Bee Model 'Y' Senior Sportster sitting atop, and a plaque with Klingensmith's picture, biography, and a list of her accomplishments affixed to the front.
