= Oakport, Minnesota =

Census-designated place in Minnesota, US

Oakport
- Census-designated place
- Location of Oakport, Minnesota
- Coordinates: 46°56′07″N 96°45′59″W
- Country: United States
- State: Minnesota
- County: Clay

Area
  - Total: 2.97 sq mi (7.69 km^{2})
  - Land: 2.97 sq mi (7.69 km^{2})
  - Water: 0 sq mi (0.00 km^{2})
- Elevation: 896 ft (273 m)

Population (2010)
  - Total: 1,387
  - Density: 467/sq mi (180/km^{2})
- Time zone: UTC−6 (Central (CST))
  - Summer (DST): UTC−5 (CDT)
- ZIP Code: 56560
- Area code: 218
- FIPS code: 27-47923
- GNIS feature ID: 2393165

Oakport was a census-designated place (CDP) in Oakport Township, Clay County, Minnesota, United States. The population was 1,387 at the 2010 census.

It was annexed into its larger neighbor, Moorhead on January 1, 2015.

== Geography ==
According to the United States Census Bureau, the CDP has a total area of 3.0 square miles (7.8 km^{2}), all land.

== Demographics ==
Historical population
Census	Pop.	Note	%±
1990	1,026		—
2000	1,334		30.0%
2010	1,387		4.0%
U.S. Decennial Census; 2010 Census

=== 2010 census ===
As of the 2010 census, there were 1,387 people, 495 households, and 405 families residing in the CDP.

=== 2000 census ===
As of the 2000 census, there were 1,334 people, 446 households, and 400 families residing in the CDP. The population density was 439.1 inhabitants per square mile (169.5/km^{2}). There were 462 housing units at an average density of 152.1 per square mile (58.7/km^{2}). The racial makeup of the CDP was 98.50% White, 0.15% African American, 0.07% Native American, 0.07% Asian, 0.15% from other races, and 1.05% from two or more races. Hispanic or Latino of any race were 0.90% of the population.

There were 446 households, out of which 45.1% had children under the age of 18 living with them, 83.2% were married couples living together, 4.3% had a female householder with no husband present, and 10.3% were non-families. 9.2% of all households were made up of individuals, and 2.7% had someone living alone who was 65 years of age or older. The average household size was 2.99 and the average family size was 3.14.

In the CDP, the population was spread out, with 30.0% under the age of 18, 6.1% from 18 to 24, 31.0% from 25 to 44, 24.7% from 45 to 64, and 8.1% who were 65 years of age or older. The median age was 38 years. For every 100 females, there were 106.8 males. For every 100 females age 18 and over, there were 103.5 males.

The median income for a household in the CDP was $62,500, and the median income for a family was $63,958. Males had a median income of $42,130 versus $26,316 for females. The per capita income for the CDP was $22,506. About 1.0% of families and 1.8% of the population were below the poverty line, including none of those under age 18 and 8.8% of those age 65 or over.
