= Baker, Minnesota =

Census-designated place in Minnesota, US

Baker
- Census-designated place
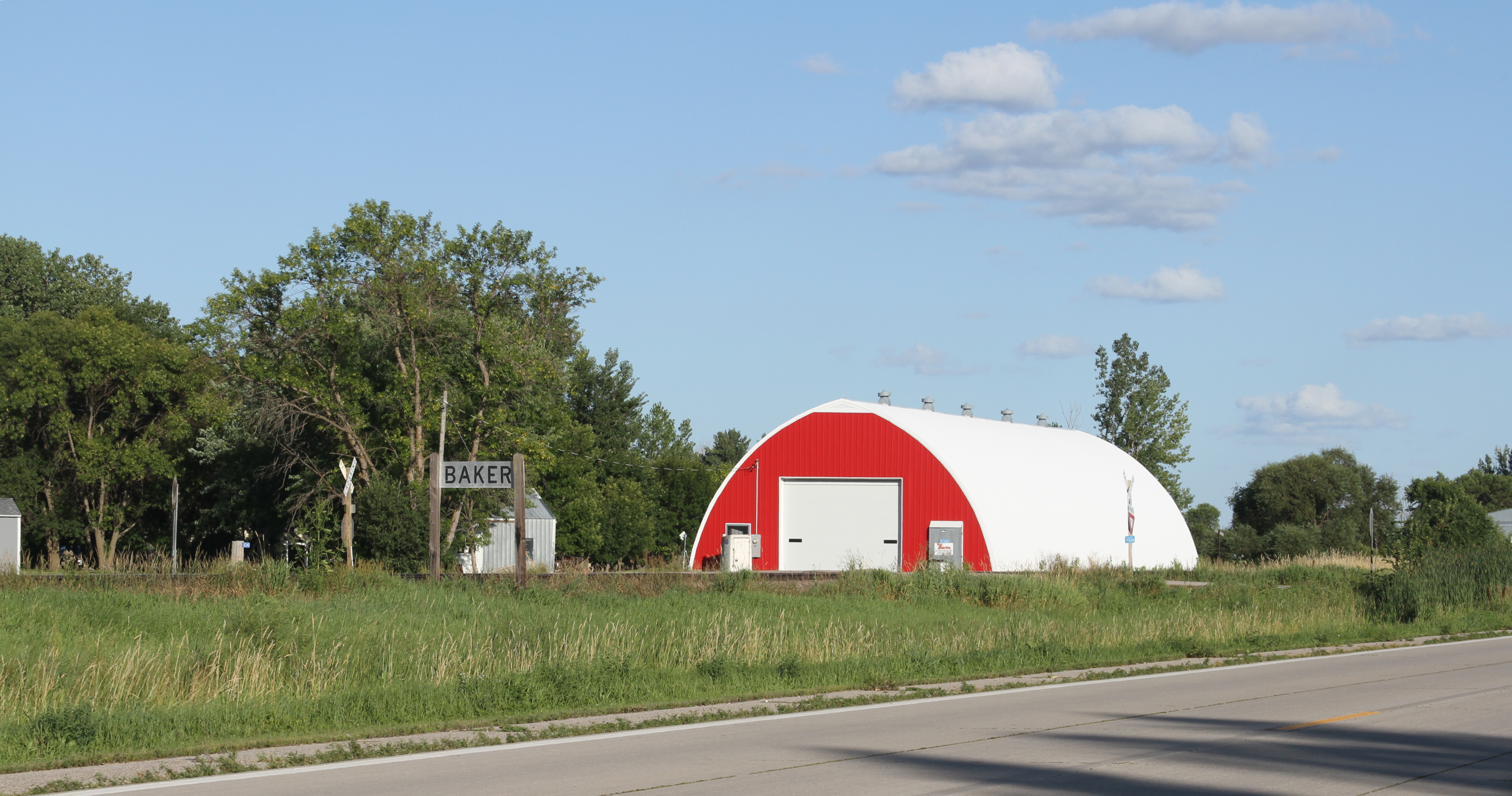

- Location within Minnesota Location within the United States
- Coordinates: 46°42′38″N 96°33′29″W
- Country: United States
- State: Minnesota
- County: Clay
- Settled: 1879
- Named for: Lester H. Baker

Area
  - Total: 1.009 sq mi (2.614 km^{2})
  - Land: 1.009 sq mi (2.614 km^{2})
  - Water: 0 sq mi (0.000 km^{2})
- Elevation: 935 ft (285 m)

Population (2020)
  - Total: 45
  - Density: 44.6/sq mi (17.22/km^{2})
- Time zone: UTC–6 (Central (CST))
  - Summer (DST): UTC–5 (CDT)
- ZIP Code: 56580
- Area code: 218
- FIPS code: 27-03214
- GNIS feature ID: 2583772

Baker is an unincorporated community and census-designated place in Clay County, Minnesota, United States. It lies roughly halfway between the cities of Sabin and Barnesville. The population was 45 at the 2020 census.

== History ==
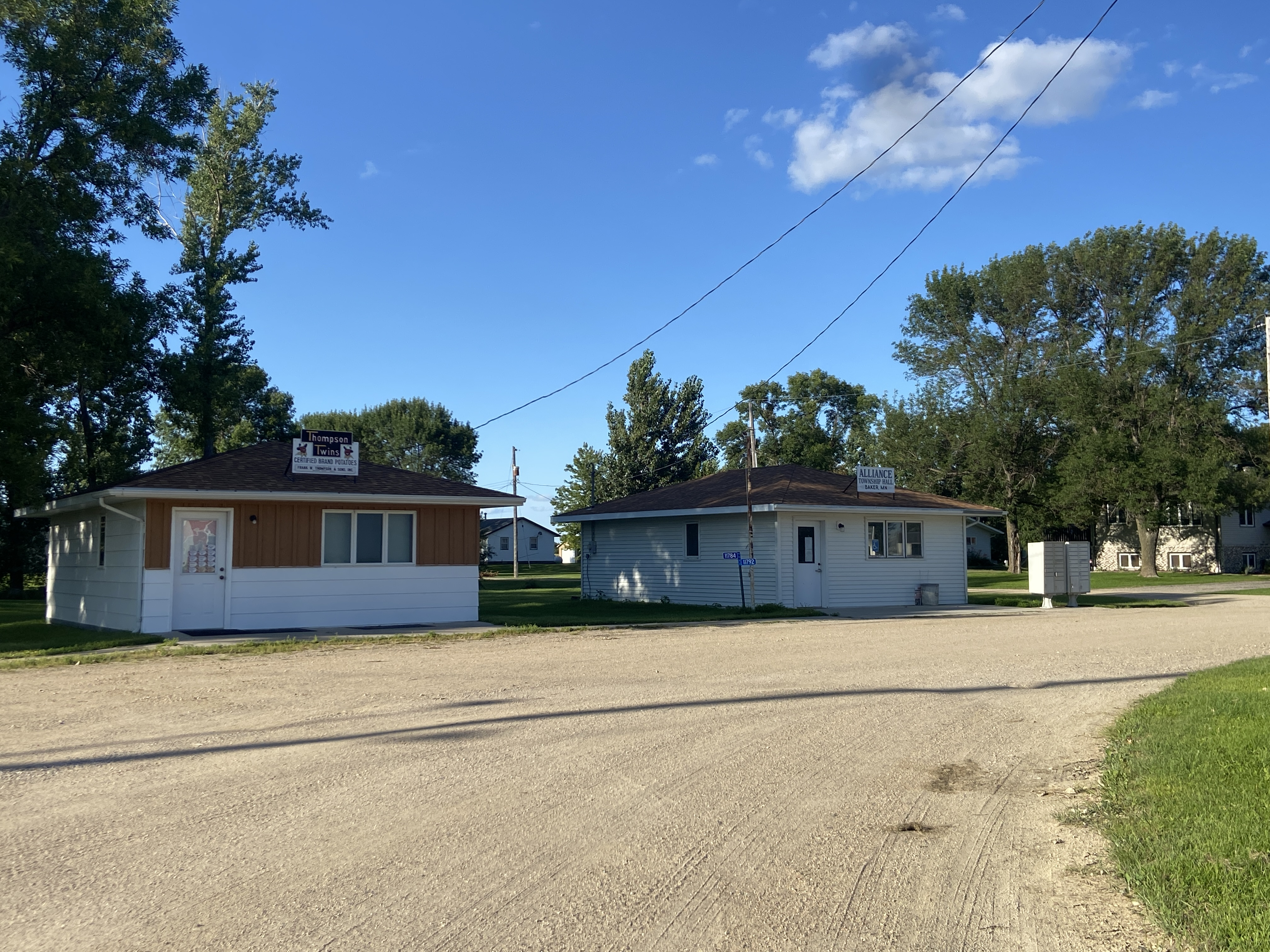
Township hall on right

Baker, a railway village was named for Lester H. Baker, a farmer who moved on to the state of Washington. The village was first settled in 1879, and the Great Northern Railway came in 1880. The first building was built in 1883 by John Erikson to store grain. The railroad in 1903 requested that the post office name be changed from Navan to Baker, to honor Lester Baker.

== Demographics ==
Historical population
Census	Pop.	Note	%±
1990	62		—
2000	58		−6.5%
2010	55		−5.2%
2020	45		−18.2%
U.S. Decennial Census; 2020 Census

=== 2020 census ===
As of the 2020 census, there were 45 people, 22 households, and 21 families living in the CDP.
