= Moland Township, Clay County, Minnesota =

Township in Minnesota, United States

Moland Township
- Township
- Location of Moland Township, within Clay County, Minnesota

- Location within the state of Minnesota Moland Township (the United States)
- Coordinates: 46°55′39″N 96°36′1″W
- Country: United States
- State: Minnesota
- County: Clay

Area
  - Total: 35.1 sq mi (91.0 km^{2})
  - Land: 35.1 sq mi (91.0 km^{2})
  - Water: 0 sq mi (0.0 km^{2})
- Elevation: 912 ft (278 m)

Population (2020)
  - Total: 252
  - Density: 7.17/sq mi (2.77/km^{2})
- Time zone: UTC-6 (Central (CST))
  - Summer (DST): UTC-5 (CDT)
- FIPS code: 27-43576
- GNIS feature ID: 0665006
- Website: https://www.molandtownship.com/

Moland Township is a township in Clay County, Minnesota, United States. The population was 252 at the 2020 census.

Moland Township was named for early settlers of Norwegian descent.

== Geography ==
According to the United States Census Bureau, the township has a total area of 35.1 square miles (91.0 km^{2}), of which 35.1 square miles (91.0 km^{2}) is land and 0.03% is water.

== Demographics ==
As of the census of 2000, there were 340 people, 124 households, and 91 families residing in the township. The population density was 9.7 people per square mile (3.7/km^{2}). There were 129 housing units at an average density of 3.7/sq mi (1.4/km^{2}). The racial makeup of the township was 99.12% White, 0.59% Asian, and 0.29% from two or more races. Hispanic or Latino of any race were 1.47% of the population.

There were 124 households, out of which 42.7% had children under the age of 18 living with them, 69.4% were married couples living together, 3.2% had a female householder with no husband present, and 26.6% were non-families. 22.6% of all households were made up of individuals, and 7.3% had someone living alone who was 65 years of age or older. The average household size was 2.74 and the average family size was 3.29.

In the township the population was spread out, with 32.4% under the age of 18, 4.7% from 18 to 24, 31.8% from 25 to 44, 20.9% from 45 to 64, and 10.3% who were 65 years of age or older. The median age was 37 years. For every 100 females, there were 108.6 males. For every 100 females age 18 and over, there were 109.1 males.

The median income for a household in the township was $52,083, and the median income for a family was $57,188. Males had a median income of $33,750 versus $28,750 for females. The per capita income for the township was $28,200. About 2.1% of families and 3.8% of the population were below the poverty line, including 5.7% of those under age 18 and none of those age 65 or over.
