= Kurtz Township, Clay County, Minnesota =

Township in Minnesota, United States

Kurtz Township
- Township
- Location of Kurtz Township, within Clay County, Minnesota

- Location within the state of Minnesota Kurtz Township (the United States)
- Coordinates: 46°46′11″N 96°44′31″W
- Country: United States
- State: Minnesota
- County: Clay

Area
  - Total: 32.5 sq mi (84.1 km^{2})
  - Land: 32.5 sq mi (84.1 km^{2})
  - Water: 0 sq mi (0.0 km^{2})
- Elevation: 912 ft (278 m)

Population (2020)
  - Total: 253
  - Density: 7.79/sq mi (3.01/km^{2})
- Time zone: UTC-6 (Central (CST))
  - Summer (DST): UTC-5 (CDT)
- FIPS code: 27-33812
- GNIS feature ID: 0664649

Kurtz Township is a township in Clay County, Minnesota, United States. The population was 253 at the 2020 census.

== History ==
Kurtz Township was named for Thomas C. Kurtz, a Minnesota banker. Merlyn Orville Valan (1926-2010), Minnesota state legislator and farmer, was born in Kurtz Township.

== Geography ==
According to the United States Census Bureau, the township has a total area of 32.5 square miles (84 km^{2}), all land.

== Demographics ==
As of the census of 2000, there were 288 people, 101 households, and 82 families residing in the township. The population density was 8.9 inhabitants per square mile (3.4/km^{2}). There were 104 housing units at an average density of 3.2 per square mile (1.2/km^{2}). The racial makeup of the township was 96.88% White, 0.69% African American, 0.35% Native American, 1.39% from other races, and 0.69% from two or more races. Hispanic or Latino of any race were 1.39% of the population.

There were 101 households, out of which 38.6% had children under the age of 18 living with them, 74.3% were married couples living together, 3.0% had a female householder with no husband present, and 18.8% were non-families. 12.9% of all households were made up of individuals, and 8.9% had someone living alone who was 65 years of age or older. The average household size was 2.85 and the average family size was 3.17.

In the township the population was spread out, with 26.4% under the age of 18, 8.0% from 18 to 24, 27.4% from 25 to 44, 28.5% from 45 to 64, and 9.7% who were 65 years of age or older. The median age was 40 years. For every 100 females, there were 101.4 males. For every 100 females age 18 and over, there were 96.3 males.

The median income for a household in the township was $62,750, and the median income for a family was $62,750. Males had a median income of $41,750 versus $26,250 for females. The per capita income for the township was $23,501. About 2.5% of families and 1.4% of the population were below the poverty line, including 2.2% of those under the age of eighteen and none of those 65 or over.
