= Cromwell Township, Clay County, Minnesota =

Township in Minnesota, United States

Cromwell Township
- Township
- Location of Cromwell Township, within Clay County, Minnesota

- Location within the state of Minnesota Cromwell Township (the United States)
- Coordinates: 46°56′31″N 96°21′13″W
- Country: United States
- State: Minnesota
- County: Clay

Area
  - Total: 33.7 sq mi (87.3 km^{2})
  - Land: 33.3 sq mi (86.2 km^{2})
  - Water: 0.42 sq mi (1.1 km^{2})
- Elevation: 1,161 ft (354 m)

Population (2020)
  - Total: 388
  - Density: 11.7/sq mi (4.50/km^{2})
- Time zone: UTC-6 (Central (CST))
  - Summer (DST): UTC-5 (CDT)
- FIPS code: 27-13798
- GNIS feature ID: 0663889

Cromwell Township is a township in Clay County, Minnesota, United States. The population was 388 at the 2020 census.

Cromwell Township was named for Oliver Cromwell, a 17th-century English military and political leader.

== Geography ==
According to the United States Census Bureau, the township has a total area of 33.7 square miles (87 km^{2}), of which 33.3 square miles (86 km^{2}) is land and 0.4 square miles (1.0 km^{2}) (1.25%) is water.

== Demographics ==
As of the census of 2000, there were 323 people, 108 households, and 92 families residing in the township. The population density was 9.7 inhabitants per square mile (3.7/km^{2}). There were 111 housing units at an average density of 3.3 per square mile (1.3/km^{2}). The racial makeup of the township was 100.00% White. Hispanic or Latino of any race were 0.31% of the population.

There were 108 households, out of which 40.7% had children under the age of 18 living with them, 75.0% were married couples living together, 6.5% had a female householder with no husband present, and 13.9% were non-families. 11.1% of all households were made up of individuals, and 6.5% had someone living alone who was 65 years of age or older. The average household size was 2.99 and the average family size was 3.17.

In the township the population was spread out, with 30.0% under the age of 18, 7.1% from 18 to 24, 27.9% from 25 to 44, 26.6% from 45 to 64, and 8.4% who were 65 years of age or older. The median age was 37 years. For every 100 females, there were 108.4 males. For every 100 females age 18 and over, there were 111.2 males.

The median income for a household in the township was $47,292, and the median income for a family was $47,708. Males had a median income of $32,083 versus $21,250 for females. The per capita income for the township was $20,993. About 4.1% of families and 4.3% of the population were below the poverty line, including 4.9% of those under age 18 and 14.3% of those age 65 or over.
