= Georgetown Township, Clay County, Minnesota =

Township in Minnesota, United States

Georgetown Township
- Township
- Location of Georgetown Township, within Clay County, Minnesota

- Location within the state of Minnesota Georgetown Township (the United States)
- Coordinates: 47°6′1″N 96°45′52″W
- Country: United States
- State: Minnesota
- County: Clay

Area
  - Total: 36.9 sq mi (95.5 km^{2})
  - Land: 36.9 sq mi (95.5 km^{2})
  - Water: 0 sq mi (0.0 km^{2})
- Elevation: 883 ft (269 m)

Population (2020)
  - Total: 135
  - Density: 3.66/sq mi (1.41/km^{2})
- Time zone: UTC-6 (Central (CST))
  - Summer (DST): UTC-5 (CDT)
- ZIP code: 56546
- Area code: 218
- FIPS code: 27-23516
- GNIS feature ID: 0664260

Georgetown Township is a township in Clay County, Minnesota, United States. The population was 135 at the 2020 census.

Georgetown Township took its name from the Georgetown trading post.

== Geography ==
According to the United States Census Bureau, the township has a total area of 36.9 square miles (96 km^{2}), all land.

== Demographics ==
As of the census of 2000, there were 188 people, 69 households, and 52 families residing in the township. The population density was 5.1 inhabitants per square mile (2.0/km^{2}). There were 71 housing units at an average density of 1.9 per square mile (0.73/km^{2}). The racial makeup of the township was 98.94% White, 0.53% Native American and 0.53% Asian. Hispanic or Latino of any race were 2.66% of the population.

There were 69 households, out of which 33.3% had children under the age of 18 living with them, 69.6% were married couples living together, 4.3% had a female householder with no husband present, and 23.2% were non-families. 20.3% of all households were made up of individuals, and 14.5% had someone living alone who was 65 years of age or older. The average household size was 2.72 and the average family size was 3.13.

In the township the population was spread out, with 27.7% under the age of 18, 3.7% from 18 to 24, 27.7% from 25 to 44, 26.1% from 45 to 64, and 14.9% who were 65 years of age or older. The median age was 41 years. For every 100 females, there were 111.2 males. For every 100 females age 18 and over, there were 106.1 males.

The median income for a household in the township was $40,000, and the median income for a family was $51,250. Males had a median income of $39,821 versus $32,917 for females. The per capita income for the township was $17,178. About 13.0% of families and 14.4% of the population were below the poverty line, including 20.3% of those under the age of eighteen and 6.7% of those 65 or over.

The Township is bisected by two main roads. Highway 75 and County Route 34.
