= Viding Township, Clay County, Minnesota =

Township in Minnesota, United States

Viding Township
- Township
- Location of Viding Township, within Clay County, Minnesota

- Location within the state of Minnesota Viding Township (the United States)
- Coordinates: 47°6′3″N 96°38′15″W
- Country: United States
- State: Minnesota
- County: Clay

Area
  - Total: 35.8 sq mi (92.6 km^{2})
  - Land: 35.8 sq mi (92.6 km^{2})
  - Water: 0 sq mi (0.0 km^{2})
- Elevation: 892 ft (272 m)

Population (2020)
  - Total: 98
  - Density: 2.7/sq mi (1.1/km^{2})
- Time zone: UTC-6 (Central (CST))
  - Summer (DST): UTC-5 (CDT)
- FIPS code: 27-67054
- GNIS feature ID: 0665870

Viding Township is a township in Clay County, Minnesota, United States. The population was 98 at the 2020 census.

Viding was the name of an early Swedish settler.

== Geography ==
According to the United States Census Bureau, the township has a total area of 35.7 square miles (92.6 km^{2}), all land.

== Demographics ==
As of the census of 2000, there were 124 people, 47 households, and 36 families residing in the township. The population density was 3.5 people per square mile (1.3/km^{2}). There were 49 housing units at an average density of 1.4/sq mi (0.5/km^{2}). The racial makeup of the township was 97.58% White, 0.81% Native American, and 1.61% from two or more races.

There were 47 households, out of which 40.4% had children under the age of 18 living with them, 70.2% were married couples living together, 2.1% had a female householder with no husband present, and 23.4% were non-families. 21.3% of all households were made up of individuals, and 8.5% had someone living alone who was 65 years of age or older. The average household size was 2.64 and the average family size was 3.03.

In the township the population was spread out, with 27.4% under the age of 18, 7.3% from 18 to 24, 31.5% from 25 to 44, 19.4% from 45 to 64, and 14.5% who were 65 years of age or older. The median age was 38 years. For every 100 females, there were 87.9 males. For every 100 females age 18 and over, there were 104.5 males.

The median income for a household in the township was $42,083, and the median income for a family was $45,625. Males had a median income of $32,188 versus $34,167 for females. The per capita income for the township was $19,637. None of the population and none of families were below the poverty line.
