= Moorhead Township, Clay County, Minnesota =

Township in Minnesota, United States

Moorhead Township
- Township
- Location of Moorhead Township, within Clay County, Minnesota

- Location within the state of Minnesota Moorhead Township (the United States)
- Coordinates: 46°50′24″N 96°42′55″W
- Country: United States
- State: Minnesota
- County: Clay

Area
  - Total: 18.9 sq mi (49.0 km^{2})
  - Land: 18.9 sq mi (49.0 km^{2})
  - Water: 0 sq mi (0.0 km^{2})
- Elevation: 912 ft (278 m)

Population (2020)
  - Total: 184
  - Estimate (2022): 185
  - Density: 9.73/sq mi (3.76/km^{2})
- Time zone: UTC-6 (Central (CST))
  - Summer (DST): UTC-5 (CDT)
- ZIP codes: 56560-56563
- Area code: 218
- FIPS code: 27-43882
- GNIS feature ID: 0665020

Moorhead Township is a township in Clay County, Minnesota, United States. The population was 184 at the 2020 census.

Moorhead Township was named for William G. Moorhead, a railroad official.

== Geography ==
According to the United States Census Bureau, the township has a total area of 18.9 square miles (49.0 km^{2}), all land.

== Demographics ==
Historical population
Census	Pop.	Note	%±
1890	294		—
1900	226		−23.1%
1910	802		254.9%
1920	221		−72.4%
1930	279		26.2%
1940	304		9.0%
1950	326		7.2%
1960	463		42.0%
1970	629		35.9%
1980	702		11.6%
1990	501		−28.6%
2000	442		−11.8%
2010	169		−61.8%
2020	184		8.9%
2022 (est.)	185		0.5%
U.S. Decennial Census; 2020 Census

=== 2020 census ===
As of the census of 2020, there were 184 people, 91 households, and 71 families residing in the township.

=== 2000 census ===
As of the census of 2000, there were 442 people, 153 households, and 132 families residing in the township. The population density was 23.3 people per square mile (9.0/km^{2}). There were 160 housing units at an average density of 8.5/sq mi (3.3/km^{2}). The racial makeup of the township was 99.10% White, 0.23% Asian, and 0.68% from two or more races. Hispanic or Latino of any race were 0.23% of the population.

There were 153 households, out of which 31.4% had children under the age of 18 living with them, 77.8% were married couples living together, 5.2% had a female householder with no husband present, and 13.7% were non-families. 7.8% of all households were made up of individuals, and 3.9% had someone living alone who was 65 years of age or older. The average household size was 2.89 and the average family size was 3.04.

In the township the population was spread out, with 24.9% under the age of 18, 6.8% from 18 to 24, 28.7% from 25 to 44, 28.3% from 45 to 64, and 11.3% who were 65 years of age or older. The median age was 40 years. For every 100 females, there were 114.6 males. For every 100 females age 18 and over, there were 115.6 males.

The median income for a household in the township was $54,286, and the median income for a family was $61,125. Males had a median income of $40,357 versus $23,750 for females. The per capita income for the township was $27,591. None of the families and 1.0% of the population were living below the poverty line, including no under eighteens and none of those over 64.
