= Morken Township, Clay County, Minnesota =

Township in Minnesota, United States

Morken Township
- Township
- Location of Morken Township, within Clay County, Minnesota

- Location within the state of Minnesota Morken Township (the United States)
- Coordinates: 47°0′47″N 96°38′14″W
- Country: United States
- State: Minnesota
- County: Clay

Area
  - Total: 35.9 sq mi (92.9 km^{2})
  - Land: 35.9 sq mi (92.9 km^{2})
  - Water: 0 sq mi (0.0 km^{2})
- Elevation: 902 ft (275 m)

Population (2020)
  - Total: 151
  - Density: 4.21/sq mi (1.63/km^{2})
- Time zone: UTC-6 (Central (CST))
  - Summer (DST): UTC-5 (CDT)
- FIPS code: 27-44170
- GNIS feature ID: 0665035

Morken Township is a township in Clay County, Minnesota, United States. The population was 151 at the 2020 census.

Morken Township was named for Torgrim O. Morken, a pioneer settler.

== Geography ==
According to the United States Census Bureau, the township has a total area of 35.9 square miles (92.9 km^{2}), all land.

== Demographics ==
As of the census of 2000, there were 203 people, 67 households, and 58 families residing in the township. The population density was 5.7 people per square mile (2.2/km^{2}). There were 75 housing units at an average density of 2.1/sq mi (0.8/km^{2}). The racial makeup of the township was 96.06% White, 0.49% Asian, and 3.45% from two or more races.

There were 67 households, out of which 38.8% had children under the age of 18 living with them, 79.1% were married couples living together, 4.5% had a female householder with no husband present, and 13.4% were non-families. 10.4% of all households were made up of individuals, and 9.0% had someone living alone who was 65 years of age or older. The average household size was 3.03 and the average family size was 3.29.

In the township the population was spread out, with 31.5% under the age of 18, 6.4% from 18 to 24, 21.2% from 25 to 44, 23.6% from 45 to 64, and 17.2% who were 65 years of age or older. The median age was 38 years. For every 100 females, there were 103.0 males. For every 100 females age 18 and over, there were 90.4 males.

The median income for a household in the township was $46,250, and the median income for a family was $46,607. Males had a median income of $39,167 versus $26,875 for females. The per capita income for the township was $17,130. About 9.1% of families and 8.7% of the population were below the poverty line, including 5.1% of those under the age of eighteen and none of those 65 or over.
