= Barnesville Township, Clay County, Minnesota =

Township in Minnesota, United States

Barnesville Township
- Township
- Location of Barnesville Township, within Clay County, Minnesota

- Location within the state of Minnesota Barnesville Township (the United States)
- Coordinates: 46°40′37″N 96°28′23″W
- Country: United States
- State: Minnesota
- County: Clay

Area
  - Total: 35.5 sq mi (92.0 km^{2})
  - Land: 35.5 sq mi (92.0 km^{2})
  - Water: 0 sq mi (0.0 km^{2})
- Elevation: 955 ft (291 m)

Population (2020)
  - Total: 181
  - Density: 5.10/sq mi (1.97/km^{2})
- Time zone: UTC-6 (Central (CST))
  - Summer (DST): UTC-5 (CDT)
- ZIP code: 56514
- Area code: 218
- FIPS code: 27-03592
- GNIS feature ID: 0663507

Barnesville Township is a township in Clay County, Minnesota, United States. The population was 181 at the 2020 census. Barnesville Township was named after the city of Barnesville.

== Geography ==
According to the United States Census Bureau, the township has a total area of 35.5 square miles (92 km^{2}), all land.

== Demographics ==
As of the census of 2000, there were 149 people, 55 households, and 44 families residing in the township. The population density was 4.2 people per square mile (1.6/km^{2}). There were 60 housing units at an average density of 1.7/sq mi (0.7/km^{2}). The racial makeup of the township was 98.66% White, 0.67% from other races, and 0.67% from two or more races.

There were 55 households, out of which 36.4% had children under the age of 18 living with them, 76.4% were married couples living together, 3.6% had a female householder with no husband present, and 18.2% were non-families. 10.9% of all households were made up of individuals, and 3.6% had someone living alone who was 65 years of age or older. The average household size was 2.71 and the average family size was 2.98.

In the township the population was spread out, with 24.8% under the age of 18, 6.7% from 18 to 24, 20.8% from 25 to 44, 36.9% from 45 to 64, and 10.7% who were 65 years of age or older. The median age was 42 years. For every 100 females, there were 122.4 males. For every 100 females age 18 and over, there were 119.6 males.

== Economy ==
The median income for a household in the township was $46,750, and the median income for a family was $48,500. Males had a median income of $31,250 versus $24,583 for females. The per capita income for the township was $16,317. 2.9% of the population live below the poverty line.
