= Riverton Township, Clay County, Minnesota =

Township in Minnesota, United States

Riverton Township
- Township
- Riverton Town Hall

- Location of Riverton Township, within Clay County, Minnesota

- Location within the state of Minnesota Riverton Township (the United States)
- Coordinates: 46°51′33″N 96°30′0″W
- Country: United States
- State: Minnesota
- County: Clay

Area
  - Total: 35.8 sq mi (92.7 km^{2})
  - Land: 35.8 sq mi (92.6 km^{2})
  - Water: 0.039 sq mi (0.1 km^{2})
- Elevation: 961 ft (293 m)

Population (2020)
  - Total: 435
  - Density: 12.2/sq mi (4.70/km^{2})
- Time zone: UTC-6 (Central (CST))
  - Summer (DST): UTC-5 (CDT)
- ZIP code: 56547
- Area code: 218
- FIPS code: 27-54718
- GNIS feature ID: 0665427

Riverton Township is a township in Clay County, Minnesota, United States. The population was 435 at the 2020 census.

Riverton Township takes its name from the Buffalo River.

== Geography ==
According to the United States Census Bureau, the township has a total area of 35.8 square miles (92.7 km^{2}), of which 35.8 square miles (92.6 km^{2}) is land and 0.04 square mile (0.1 km^{2}) (0.08%) is water.

== Demographics ==
Road dividing wooded area and crops

As of the census of 2000, there were 462 people, 159 households, and 124 families residing in the township. The population density was 12.9 people per square mile (5.0/km^{2}). There were 166 housing units at an average density of 4.6/sq mi (1.8/km^{2}). The racial makeup of the township was 98.48% White, 0.22% African American, 0.43% Native American, and 0.87% from two or more races. Hispanic or Latino of any race were 0.65% of the population.

There were 159 households, out of which 39.6% had children under the age of 18 living with them, 70.4% were married couples living together, 3.1% had a female householder with no husband present, and 22.0% were non-families. 16.4% of all households were made up of individuals, and 5.7% had someone living alone who was 65 years of age or older. The average household size was 2.91 and the average family size was 3.24.

In the township the population was spread out, with 30.3% under the age of 18, 6.1% from 18 to 24, 32.9% from 25 to 44, 23.6% from 45 to 64, and 7.1% who were 65 years of age or older. The median age was 37 years. For every 100 females, there were 104.4 males. For every 100 females age 18 and over, there were 107.7 males.

The median income for a household in the township was $51,042, and the median income for a family was $56,538. Males had a median income of $34,107 versus $21,875 for females. The per capita income for the township was $17,670. About 5.5% of families and 8.5% of the population were below the poverty line, including 13.1% of those under age 18 and 11.8% of those age 65 or over.
