= Rustad, Minnesota =

Unincorporated community in Minnesota, United States

Rustad
- Unincorporated community
- Location within Minnesota Location within the United States
- Coordinates: 46°44′00″N 96°44′41″W
- Country: United States
- State: Minnesota
- County: Clay
- Elevation: 912 ft (278 m)
- Time zone: UTC-6 (Central (CST))
  - Summer (DST): UTC-5 (CDT)
- Area code: 218
- GNIS feature ID: 650427

Rustad is an unincorporated community in Clay County, in the U.S. state of Minnesota.

== History ==
A post office was established as Kurtz in 1891, the name was changed to Rustad in 1907, and the post office closed in 1954. The community was named for Samuel Rustad, an early merchant.
