= Spring Prairie Township, Clay County, Minnesota =

Township in Minnesota, United States

Spring Prairie Township
- Township
- Location of Spring Prairie Township, within Clay County, Minnesota

- Location within the state of Minnesota Spring Prairie Township (the United States)
- Coordinates: 46°56′5″N 96°29′3″W
- Country: United States
- State: Minnesota
- County: Clay

Area
  - Total: 35.7 sq mi (92.4 km^{2})
  - Land: 35.6 sq mi (92.3 km^{2})
  - Water: 0 sq mi (0.0 km^{2})
- Elevation: 955 ft (291 m)

Population (2020)
  - Total: 506
  - Density: 14.2/sq mi (5.48/km^{2})
- Time zone: UTC-6 (Central (CST))
  - Summer (DST): UTC-5 (CDT)
- FIPS code: 27-62032
- GNIS feature ID: 0665679

Spring Prairie Township is a township in Clay County, Minnesota, United States. As of the 2020 census, the population was 506, up from 368 at the previous census.

The township is notable for being the home of an established Hutterite colony, called Spring Prairie Colony. As a result about a fourth (25.7%) of the township speak an other than English or Spanish Indo-European language, most likely the Hutterite German.

== Geography ==
According to the United States Census Bureau, the township has a total area of 35.7 square miles (92.4 km^{2}), of which 35.6 square miles (92.3 km^{2}) is land and 0.03% is water.

Spring Prairie Township was named from its numerous streams.

== Demographics ==
Historical population
Census	Pop.	Note	%±
2000	364		—
2010	368		1.1%
2020	506		37.5%
U.S. Censuses: 2010, and 2020

As of the census of 2000, there were 364 people, 111 households, and 90 families residing in the township. The population density was 10.2 people per square mile (3.9/km^{2}). There were 116 housing units at an average density of 3.3/sq mi (1.3/km^{2}). The racial makeup of the township was 99.18% White, 0.27% Asian, 0.55% from other races. Hispanic or Latino of any race were 1.92% of the population.

There were 111 households, out of which 44.1% had children under the age of 18 living with them, 76.6% were married couples living together, 1.8% had a female householder with no husband present, and 18.9% were non-families. 15.3% of all households were made up of individuals, and 5.4% had someone living alone who was 65 years of age or older. The average household size was 3.28 and the average family size was 3.69.

In the township the population was spread out, with 34.6% under the age of 18, 7.4% from 18 to 24, 28.8% from 25 to 44, 22.8% from 45 to 64, and 6.3% who were 65 years of age or older. The median age was 31 years. For every 100 females, there were 116.7 males. For every 100 females age 18 and over, there were 116.4 males.

The median income for a household in the township was $44,167, and the median income for a family was $44,464. Males had a median income of $36,000 versus $26,875 for females. The per capita income for the township was $13,731. About 21.8% of families and 29.1% of the population were below the poverty line, including 39.7% of those under age 18 and 20.0% of those age 65 or over.
