= Holy Cross Township, Clay County, Minnesota =

Township in Minnesota, United States

Holy Cross Township
- Township
- Location of Holy Cross Township, within Clay County, Minnesota

- Location within the state of Minnesota Holy Cross Township (the United States)
- Coordinates: 46°40′40″N 96°43′55″W
- Country: United States
- State: Minnesota
- County: Clay

Area
  - Total: 33.2 sq mi (86.1 km^{2})
  - Land: 33.2 sq mi (86.1 km^{2})
  - Water: 0 sq mi (0.0 km^{2})
- Elevation: 915 ft (279 m)

Population (2020)
  - Total: 113
  - Density: 3.40/sq mi (1.31/km^{2})
- Time zone: UTC-6 (Central (CST))
  - Summer (DST): UTC-5 (CDT)
- FIPS code: 27-29906
- GNIS feature ID: 0664509

Holy Cross Township is a township in Clay County, Minnesota, United States. The population was 113 at the 2020 census.

Holy Cross Township was named for a tall Christian cross which stood at a local cemetery.

== Geography ==
According to the United States Census Bureau, the township has a total area of 33.2 square miles (86 km^{2}), all land.

== Demographics ==
As of the census of 2000, there were 129 people, 47 households, and 43 families residing in the township. The population density was 3.9 inhabitants per square mile (1.5/km^{2}). There were 59 housing units at an average density of 1.8 per square mile (0.69/km^{2}). The racial makeup of the township was 100.00% White.

There were 47 households, out of which 36.2% had children under the age of 18 living with them, 87.2% were married couples living together, and 6.4% were non-families. 6.4% of all households were made up of individuals, and 4.3% had someone living alone who was 65 years of age or older. The average household size was 2.74 and the average family size was 2.82.

In the township the population was spread out, with 27.1% under the age of 18, 2.3% from 18 to 24, 26.4% from 25 to 44, 29.5% from 45 to 64, and 14.7% who were 65 years of age or older. The median age was 43 years. For every 100 females, there were 115.0 males. For every 100 females age 18 and over, there were 108.9 males.

The median income for a household in the township was $45,313, and the median income for a family was $45,313. Males had a median income of $33,125 versus $21,563 for females. The per capita income for the township was $15,863. There were 4.9% of families and 7.5% of the population living below the poverty line, including 13.2% of under eighteens and none of those over 64.
