= Hagen Township, Clay County, Minnesota =

Township in Minnesota, United States

Hagen Township
- Township
- Location of Hagen Township, within Clay County, Minnesota

- Location within the state of Minnesota Hagen Township (the United States)
- Coordinates: 47°7′2″N 96°23′27″W
- Country: United States
- State: Minnesota
- County: Clay

Area
  - Total: 32.5 sq mi (84.1 km^{2})
  - Land: 32.5 sq mi (84.1 km^{2})
  - Water: 0.039 sq mi (0.1 km^{2})
- Elevation: 1,001 ft (305 m)

Population (2020)
  - Total: 128
  - Density: 3.94/sq mi (1.52/km^{2})
- Time zone: UTC-6 (Central (CST))
  - Summer (DST): UTC-5 (CDT)
- FIPS code: 27-26504
- GNIS feature ID: 0664369

Hagen Township is a township in Clay County, Minnesota, United States. The population was 128 at the 2020 census.

Hagen Township was named for an early Norwegian settler.

== Geography ==
According to the United States Census Bureau, the township has a total area of 32.5 square miles (84 km^{2}), of which 32.5 square miles (84 km^{2}) is land and 0.04 square miles (0.10 km^{2}) (0.06%) is water.

== Demographics ==
As of the census of 2000, there were 153 people, 56 households, and 45 families residing in the township. The population density was 4.7 inhabitants per square mile (1.8/km^{2}). There were 72 housing units at an average density of 2.2 per square mile (0.85/km^{2}). The racial makeup of the township was 100.00% White.

There were 56 households, out of which 30.4% had children under the age of 18 living with them, 75.0% were married couples living together, 1.8% had a female householder with no husband present, and 19.6% were non-families. 14.3% of all households were made up of individuals, and 3.6% had someone living alone who was 65 years of age or older. The average household size was 2.73 and the average family size was 3.07.

In the township the population was spread out, with 26.8% under the age of 18, 5.2% from 18 to 24, 19.6% from 25 to 44, 36.6% from 45 to 64, and 11.8% who were 65 years of age or older. The median age was 44 years. For every 100 females, there were 96.2 males. For every 100 females age 18 and over, there were 111.3 males.

The median income for a household in the township was $37,500, and the median income for a family was $37,143. Males had a median income of $32,083 versus $26,250 for females. The per capita income for the township was $16,186. None of the population or families were below the poverty line.
