= Felton Township, Clay County, Minnesota =

Township in Minnesota, United States

Felton Township
- Township
- Location of Felton Township, within Clay County, Minnesota

- Location within the state of Minnesota Felton Township (the United States)
- Coordinates: 47°6′58″N 96°30′53″W
- Country: United States
- State: Minnesota
- County: Clay

Area
  - Total: 35.3 sq mi (91.3 km^{2})
  - Land: 35.3 sq mi (91.3 km^{2})
  - Water: 0 sq mi (0.0 km^{2})
- Elevation: 909 ft (277 m)

Population (2020)
  - Total: 83
  - Density: 2.4/sq mi (0.91/km^{2})
- Time zone: UTC-6 (Central (CST))
  - Summer (DST): UTC-5 (CDT)
- ZIP code: 56536
- Area code: 218
- FIPS code: 27-20852
- GNIS feature ID: 0664157

Felton Township is a township in Clay County, Minnesota, United States. The population was 83 at the 2020 census.

Felton Township was named for S. M. Felton, a railroad official.

== Geography ==
According to the United States Census Bureau, the township has a total area of 35.3 square miles (91 km^{2}), all land.

== Demographics ==
As of the census of 2000, there were 108 people, 41 households, and 27 families residing in the township. The population density was 3.1 inhabitants per square mile (1.2/km^{2}). There were 49 housing units at an average density of 1.4 per square mile (0.54/km^{2}). The racial makeup of the township was 96.30% White, 0.93% African American, 1.85% Native American, and 0.93% from two or more races.

There were 41 households, out of which 24.4% had children under the age of 18 living with them, 56.1% were married couples living together, 4.9% had a female householder with no husband present, and 34.1% were non-families. 29.3% of all households were made up of individuals, and 17.1% had someone living alone who was 65 years of age or older. The average household size was 2.63 and the average family size was 3.41.

In the township the population was spread out, with 25.0% under the age of 18, 8.3% from 18 to 24, 22.2% from 25 to 44, 26.9% from 45 to 64, and 17.6% who were 65 years of age or older. The median age was 43 years. For every 100 females, there were 129.8 males. For every 100 females age 18 and over, there were 138.2 males.

The median income for a household in the township was $43,750, and the median income for a family was $76,145. Males had a median income of $40,833 versus $22,000 for females. The per capita income for the township was $21,187. There were 12.0% of families and 7.9% of the population living below the poverty line, including no under eighteens and 50.0% of those over 64.
