= Skree Township, Clay County, Minnesota =

Township in Minnesota, United States

Skree Township
- Township
- Location of Skree Township, within Clay County, Minnesota

- Location within the state of Minnesota Skree Township (the United States)
- Coordinates: 46°45′13″N 96°22′13″W
- Country: United States
- State: Minnesota
- County: Clay

Area
  - Total: 33.9 sq mi (87.7 km^{2})
  - Land: 33.6 sq mi (86.9 km^{2})
  - Water: 0.27 sq mi (0.7 km^{2})
- Elevation: 1,086 ft (331 m)

Population (2020)
  - Total: 177
  - Density: 5.28/sq mi (2.04/km^{2})
- Time zone: UTC-6 (Central (CST))
  - Summer (DST): UTC-5 (CDT)
- FIPS code: 27-60718
- GNIS feature ID: 0665628

Skree Township is a township in Clay County, Minnesota, United States. The population was 177 at the 2020 census.

Skree Township was named for Mikkel Skree, a Norwegian immigrant and pioneer farmer.

== Geography ==
According to the United States Census Bureau, the township has a total area of 33.8 square miles (87.6 km^{2}), of which 33.6 square miles (86.9 km^{2}) is land and 0.3 square mile (0.7 km^{2}) (0.83%) is water.

== Demographics ==
As of the census of 2000, there were 166 people, 62 households, and 48 families residing in the township. The population density was 4.9 people per square mile (1.9/km^{2}). There were 64 housing units at an average density of 1.9/sq mi (0.7/km^{2}). The racial makeup of the township was 99.40% White and 0.60% Asian.

There were 62 households, out of which 33.9% had children under the age of 18 living with them, 71.0% were married couples living together, 4.8% had a female householder with no husband present, and 21.0% were non-families. 21.0% of all households were made up of individuals, and 11.3% had someone living alone who was 65 years of age or older. The average household size was 2.68 and the average family size was 3.06.

In the township the population was spread out, with 27.7% under the age of 18, 4.2% from 18 to 24, 30.1% from 25 to 44, 24.7% from 45 to 64, and 13.3% who were 65 years of age or older. The median age was 40 years. For every 100 females, there were 102.4 males. For every 100 females aged 18 and over, there were 96.7 males.

The median income for a household in the township was $46,250, and the median income for a family was $51,250. Males had a median income of $32,083 versus $26,250 for females. The per capita income for the township was $15,174. About 4.3% of families and 8.3% of the population were below the poverty line, including 10.9% of those under the age of eighteen and 11.8% of those 65 or over.
