= Goose Prairie Township, Clay County, Minnesota =

Township in Minnesota, United States

Goose Prairie Township
- Township
- Location of Goose Prairie Township, within Clay County, Minnesota

- Location within the state of Minnesota Goose Prairie Township (the United States)
- Coordinates: 47°1′1″N 96°15′27″W
- Country: United States
- State: Minnesota
- County: Clay

Area
  - Total: 35.6 sq mi (92.1 km^{2})
  - Land: 34.8 sq mi (90.2 km^{2})
  - Water: 0.77 sq mi (2.0 km^{2})
- Elevation: 1,220 ft (372 m)

Population (2020)
  - Total: 200
  - Density: 5.7/sq mi (2.2/km^{2})
- Time zone: UTC-6 (Central (CST))
  - Summer (DST): UTC-5 (CDT)
- FIPS code: 27-24542
- GNIS feature ID: 0664298

Goose Prairie Township is a township in Clay County, Minnesota, United States. The population was 200 at the 2020 census.

Goose Prairie Township was named from the former abundance of wild geese on its lakes.

== Geography ==
According to the United States Census Bureau, the township has a total area of 35.6 square miles (92 km^{2}), of which 34.8 square miles (90 km^{2}) is land and 0.8 square miles (2.1 km^{2}) (2.14%) is water.

== Demographics ==
As of the census of 2000, there were 199 people, 64 households, and 57 families residing in the township. The population density was 5.7 inhabitants per square mile (2.2/km^{2}). There were 69 housing units at an average density of 2.0 per square mile (0.77/km^{2}). The racial makeup of the township was 98.99% White and 1.01% Native American.

There were 64 households, out of which 40.6% had children under the age of 18 living with them, 82.8% were married couples living together, 1.6% had a female householder with no husband present, and 10.9% were non-families. 9.4% of all households were made up of individuals, and 6.3% had someone living alone who was 65 years of age or older. The average household size was 3.11 and the average family size was 3.32.

In the township the population was spread out, with 31.7% under the age of 18, 6.5% from 18 to 24, 22.6% from 25 to 44, 25.1% from 45 to 64, and 14.1% who were 65 years of age or older. The median age was 41 years. For every 100 females, there were 118.7 males. For every 100 females age 18 and over, there were 109.2 males.

The median income for a household in the township was $37,083, and the median income for a family was $40,417. Males had a median income of $26,250 versus $21,786 for females. The per capita income for the township was $13,285. About 12.3% of families and 17.4% of the population were below the poverty line, including 20.3% of those under the age of eighteen and 26.1% of those 65 or over.
