= Flowing Township, Clay County, Minnesota =

Township in Minnesota, United States

Flowing Township
- Township
- Location of Flowing Township, within Clay County, Minnesota

- Location within the state of Minnesota Flowing Township (the United States)
- Coordinates: 47°1′40″N 96°30′44″W
- Country: United States
- State: Minnesota
- County: Clay

Area
  - Total: 35.9 sq mi (93.1 km^{2})
  - Land: 35.9 sq mi (93.0 km^{2})
  - Water: 0.039 sq mi (0.1 km^{2})
- Elevation: 922 ft (281 m)

Population (2020)
  - Total: 89
  - Density: 2.5/sq mi (0.96/km^{2})
- Time zone: UTC-6 (Central (CST))
  - Summer (DST): UTC-5 (CDT)
- FIPS code: 27-21482
- GNIS feature ID: 0664183

Flowing Township is a township in Clay County, Minnesota, United States. The population was 89 at the 2020 census.

According to Warren Upham, the origin of the name Flowing is obscure "unless it refers to artesian or flowing wells".

== Geography ==
According to the United States Census Bureau, the township has a total area of 35.9 square miles (93 km^{2}), of which 35.9 square miles (93 km^{2}) is land and 0.04 square miles (0.10 km^{2}) (0.06%) is water.

== Demographics ==
As of the census of 2000, there were 97 people, 33 households, and 26 families residing in the township. The population density was 2.7 inhabitants per square mile (1.0/km^{2}). There were 34 housing units at an average density of 0.9 per square mile (0.35/km^{2}). The racial makeup of the township was 98.97% White and 1.03% Native American.

There were 33 households, out of which 45.5% had children under the age of 18 living with them, 72.7% were married couples living together, 3.0% had a female householder with no husband present, and 21.2% were non-families. 21.2% of all households were made up of individuals, and 15.2% had someone living alone who was 65 years of age or older. The average household size was 2.94 and the average family size was 3.42.

In the township the population was spread out, with 29.9% under the age of 18, 10.3% from 18 to 24, 24.7% from 25 to 44, 27.8% from 45 to 64, and 7.2% who were 65 years of age or older. The median age was 37 years. For every 100 females, there were 86.5 males. For every 100 females age 18 and over, there were 88.9 males.

The median income for a household in the township was $66,875, and the median income for a family was $66,875. Males had a median income of $59,375 versus $17,500 for females. The per capita income for the township was $24,326. None of the population and none of the families were below the poverty line.
