= Parke Township, Clay County, Minnesota =

Township in Minnesota, United States

Parke Township
- Township
- Location of Parke Township, within Clay County, Minnesota

- Location within the state of Minnesota Parke Township (the United States)
- Coordinates: 46°46′18″N 96°13′28″W
- Country: United States
- State: Minnesota
- County: Clay

Area
  - Total: 36.0 sq mi (93.3 km^{2})
  - Land: 34.1 sq mi (88.3 km^{2})
  - Water: 1.9 sq mi (5.0 km^{2})
- Elevation: 1,306 ft (398 m)

Population (2020)
  - Total: 526
  - Density: 15.4/sq mi (5.96/km^{2})
- Time zone: UTC-6 (Central (CST))
  - Summer (DST): UTC-5 (CDT)
- FIPS code: 27-49678
- GNIS feature ID: 0665254

Parke Township is a township in Clay County, Minnesota, United States. The population was 526 at the 2020 census.

== History ==
According to Warren Upham, Parke Township was probably named for an early settler.

== Geography ==
According to the United States Census Bureau, the township has a total area of 36.0 square miles (93.3 km^{2}), of which 34.1 square miles (88.3 km^{2}) is land and 1.9 square miles (5.0 km^{2}) (5.33%) is water.

== Demographics ==
As of the census of 2000, there were 450 people, 167 households, and 134 families residing in the township. The population density was 13.2 people per square mile (5.1/km^{2}). There were 227 housing units at an average density of 6.7/sq mi (2.6/km^{2}). The racial makeup of the township was 99.11% White, 0.22% African American, 0.44% Native American and 0.22% Asian.

There were 167 households, out of which 35.9% had children under the age of 18 living with them, 75.4% were married couples living together, 1.8% had a female householder with no husband present, and 19.2% were non-families. 16.8% of all households were made up of individuals, and 5.4% had someone living alone who was 65 years of age or older. The average household size was 2.69 and the average family size was 3.06.

In the township the population was spread out, with 26.0% under the age of 18, 7.1% from 18 to 24, 22.4% from 25 to 44, 33.3% from 45 to 64, and 11.1% who were 65 years of age or older. The median age was 41 years. For every 100 females, there were 125.0 males. For every 100 females age 18 and over, there were 114.8 males.

The median income for a household in the township was $51,094, and the median income for a family was $58,036. Males had a median income of $38,542 versus $27,000 for females. The per capita income for the township was $22,207. About 1.6% of families and 3.7% of the population were below the poverty line, including 5.6% of those under age 18 and 7.7% of those age 65 or over.
