= Hitterdal, Minnesota =

City in Minnesota, United States

- City
- Location of Hitterdal, Minnesota
- Coordinates: 46°58′40″N 96°15′22″W
- Country: United States
- State: Minnesota
- County: Clay
- Founded: 1887
- Incorporated: April 1, 1918

Government
  - Mayor: Gayle Holte

Area
  - Total: 0.936 sq mi (2.424 km^{2})
  - Land: 0.861 sq mi (2.229 km^{2})
  - Water: 0.075 sq mi (0.194 km^{2})
- Elevation: 1,250 ft (380 m)

Population (2020)
  - Total: 199
  - Estimate (2022): 200
  - Density: 232.0/sq mi (89.56/km^{2})
- Time zone: UTC−6 (Central (CST))
  - Summer (DST): UTC−5 (CDT)
- ZIP Code: 56552
- Area code: 218
- FIPS code: 27-29402
- GNIS feature ID: 2394392
- Sales tax: 7.375%

Hitterdal (/ˈhɪtərdɑːl/ HIT-ər-dahl) is a city in Clay County, Minnesota, United States. The population was 199 at the 2020 census.

== History ==
A post office called Hitterdal has been in operation since 1887. The city was named after Hitterdal Municipality in Norway.

== Geography ==
According to the United States Census Bureau, the city has a total area of 0.936 square miles (2.42 km^{2}), of which 0.861 square miles (2.23 km^{2}) is land and 0.075 square miles (0.19 km^{2}) is water.

== Demographics ==
Historical population
Census	Pop.	Note	%±
1920	204		—
1930	198		−2.9%
1940	268		35.4%
1950	262		−2.2%
1960	235		−10.3%
1970	201		−14.5%
1980	253		25.9%
1990	242		−4.3%
2000	201		−16.9%
2010	201		0.0%
2020	199		−1.0%
2022 (est.)	200		0.5%
U.S. Decennial Census; 2020 Census

=== 2010 census ===
As of the 2010 census, there were 201 people, 89 households, and 58 families living in the city. The population density was 233.7 inhabitants per square mile (90.2/km^{2}). There were 100 housing units at an average density of 116.3 per square mile (44.9/km^{2}). The racial makeup of the city was 96.5% White, 1.5% African American, 0.5% Asian, and 1.5% from two or more races. Hispanic or Latino of any race were 1.0% of the population.

There were 89 households, of which 27.0% had children under the age of 18 living with them, 56.2% were married couples living together, 5.6% had a female householder with no husband present, 3.4% had a male householder with no wife present, and 34.8% were non-families. 30.3% of all households were made up of individuals, and 14.6% had someone living alone who was 65 years of age or older. The average household size was 2.26 and the average family size was 2.81.

The median age in the city was 44.5 years. 21.9% of residents were under the age of 18; 9.1% were between the ages of 18 and 24; 20% were from 25 to 44; 27.5% were from 45 to 64; and 21.9% were 65 years of age or older. The gender makeup of the city was 55.7% male and 44.3% female.

=== 2000 census ===
As of the 2000 census, there were 201 people, 86 households, and 57 families living in the city. The population density was 249.3 inhabitants per square mile (96.3/km^{2}). There were 102 housing units at an average density of 126.5 per square mile (48.8/km^{2}). The racial makeup of the city was 97.01% White, 1.49% Asian, 1.00% from other races, and 0.50% from two or more races. Hispanic or Latino of any race were 1.49% of the population.

There were 86 households, out of which 29.1% had children under the age of 18 living with them, 55.8% were married couples living together, 3.5% had a female householder with no husband present, and 33.7% were non-families. 30.2% of all households were made up of individuals, and 17.4% had someone living alone who was 65 years of age or older. The average household size was 2.34 and the average family size was 2.89.

In the city, the population was spread out, with 25.4% under the age of 18, 8.5% from 18 to 24, 21.9% from 25 to 44, 26.4% from 45 to 64, and 17.9% who were 65 years of age or older. The median age was 42 years. For every 100 females, there were 118.5 males. For every 100 females age 18 and over, there were 105.5 males.

The median income for a household in the city was $32,500, and the median income for a family was $35,625. Males had a median income of $33,125 versus $19,375 for females. The per capita income for the city was $13,737. About 17.2% of families and 12.3% of the population were below the poverty line, including 18.8% of those under the age of eighteen and none of those 65 or over.

== Government ==
The current mayor is Gayle Holte.
