= Elbow Lake, Becker County, Minnesota =

Census-designated place in Minnesota, US

Elbow Lake, Minnesota
- CDP
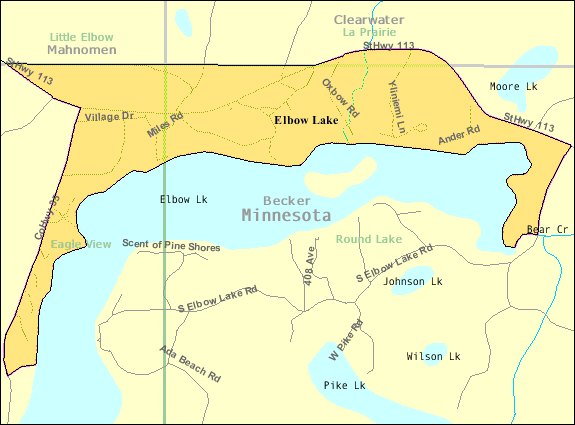
- Elbow Lake with the lake and principal roads
- Interactive map of Elbow Lake, Minnesota
- Location within Minnesota
- Coordinates: 47.1467°N 95.5441°W
- Country: United States
- State: Minnesota
- Counties: Becker, Clearwater

Area
  - Total: 1.337 sq mi (3.462 km^{2})
  - Land: 1.337 sq mi (3.462 km^{2})
  - Water: 0 sq mi (0.000 km^{2}) 0.00%
- Elevation: 1,601 ft (488 m)

Population (2020)
  - Total: 118
  - Estimate (2025): 90
  - Density: 88.3/sq mi (34.1/km^{2})
- Time zone: UTC–6 (Central (CST))
  - Summer (DST): UTC–5 (CDT)
- ZIP Code: 56589
- Area code: 218
- FIPS code: 27-18440
- GNIS feature ID: 2392989

Elbow Lake is a census-designated place (CDP) in Becker and Clearwater Counties in Minnesota, United States. The population was 118 as of the 2020 census, and was estimated at 90 in 2025.

== Geography ==
According to the United States Census Bureau, the CDP has a total area of 1.337 square miles (3.46 km^{2}), all land.

== Demographics ==
Historical population
Census	Pop.	Note	%±
2000	104		—
2010	95		−8.7%
2020	118		24.2%
2025 (est.)	90		−23.7%
U.S. Decennial Census; 2020 Census

As of the 2024 American Community Survey, there were 29 estimated households in Elbow Lake with an average of 2.62 persons per household. The CDP has a median household income of $29,583. Approximately 43.4% of the CDP's population lives at or below the poverty line. Elbow Lake has an estimated 27.1% employment rate, with 5.6% of the population holding a bachelor's degree or higher and 61.1% holding a high school diploma. There were 64 housing units at an average density of 47.87 per square mile (18.48/km^{2}).

The top five reported languages (people were allowed to report up to two languages, thus the figures will generally add to more than 100%) were English (93.2%), Spanish (0.0%), Indo-European (0.0%), Asian and Pacific Islander (0.0%), and Other (6.8%).

The median age in the CDP was 46.1 years.

Elbow Lake, Minnesota – racial and ethnic composition Note: the US Census treats Hispanic/Latino as an ethnic category. This table excludes Latinos from the racial categories and assigns them to a separate category. Hispanics/Latinos may be of any race.
Race / ethnicity (NH = non-Hispanic)	Pop. 2000	Pop. 2010	Pop. 2020	% 2000	% 2010	% 2020
White alone (NH)	25	27	29	24.04%	28.42%	24.58%
Black or African American alone (NH)	0	0	0	0.00%	0.00%	0.00%
Native American or Alaska Native alone (NH)	75	54	65	72.12%	56.84%	55.08%
Asian alone (NH)	0	0	0	0.00%	0.00%	0.00%
Pacific Islander alone (NH)	0	0	1	0.00%	0.00%	0.85%
Other race alone (NH)	0	0	3	0.00%	0.00%	2.54%
Mixed race or multiracial (NH)	2	14	19	1.92%	14.74%	16.10%
Hispanic or Latino (any race)	2	0	1	1.92%	0.00%	0.85%
Total	104	95	118	100.00%	100.00%	100.00%

=== 2020 census ===
As of the 2020 census, there were 118 people, 43 households, and 27 families residing in the CDP. The population density was 88.26 inhabitants per square mile (34.08/km^{2}). There were 68 housing units at an average density of 50.86 per square mile (19.64/km^{2}). The racial makeup of the CDP was 24.58% White, 0.00% African American, 55.08% Native American, 0.00% Asian, 0.85% Pacific Islander, 2.54% from some other races and 16.95% from two or more races. Hispanic or Latino people of any race were 0.85% of the population.

=== 2010 census ===
As of the 2010 census, there were 95 people, 38 households, and 23 families residing in the CDP. The population density was 71.05 inhabitants per square mile (27.43/km^{2}). There were 74 housing units at an average density of 55.35 per square mile (21.37/km^{2}). The racial makeup of the CDP was 28.42% White, 0.00% African American, 56.84% Native American, 0.00% Asian, 0.00% Pacific Islander, 0.00% from some other races and 14.74% from two or more races. Hispanic or Latino people of any race were 0.00% of the population.

=== 2000 census ===
As of the 2000 census, there were 104 people, 36 households, and 24 families residing in the CDP. The population density was 85.84 inhabitants per square mile (33.14/km^{2}). There were 62 housing units at an average density of 51.17 per square mile (19.76/km^{2}). The racial makeup of the CDP was 25.00% White, 0.00% African American, 72.12% Native American, 0.00% Asian, 0.00% Pacific Islander, 0.00% from some other races and 2.88% from two or more races. Hispanic or Latino people of any race were 1.92% of the population.

There were 36 households, out of which 41.7% had children under the age of 18 living with them, 47.2% were married couples living together, 19.4% had a female householder with no husband present, and 30.6% were non-families. 27.8% of all households were made up of individuals, and 13.9% had someone living alone who was 65 years of age or older. The average household size was 2.89 and the average family size was 3.44.

In the CDP, the population was spread out, with 35.6% under the age of 18, 7.7% from 18 to 24, 25.0% from 25 to 44, 23.1% from 45 to 64, and 8.7% who were 65 years of age or older. The median age was 35 years. For every 100 females, there were 82.5 males. For every 100 females age 18 and over, there were 97.1 males.

The median income for a household in the CDP was $17,708, and the median income for a family was $18,393. Males had a median income of $20,625 versus $16,042 for females. The per capita income for the CDP was $6,713. There were 27.0% of families and 24.2% of the population living below the poverty line, including 26.4% of under eighteens and none of those over 64.

== See also ==
- List of census-designated places in Minnesota
