= Georgetown, Minnesota =

City in Minnesota, United States

- City
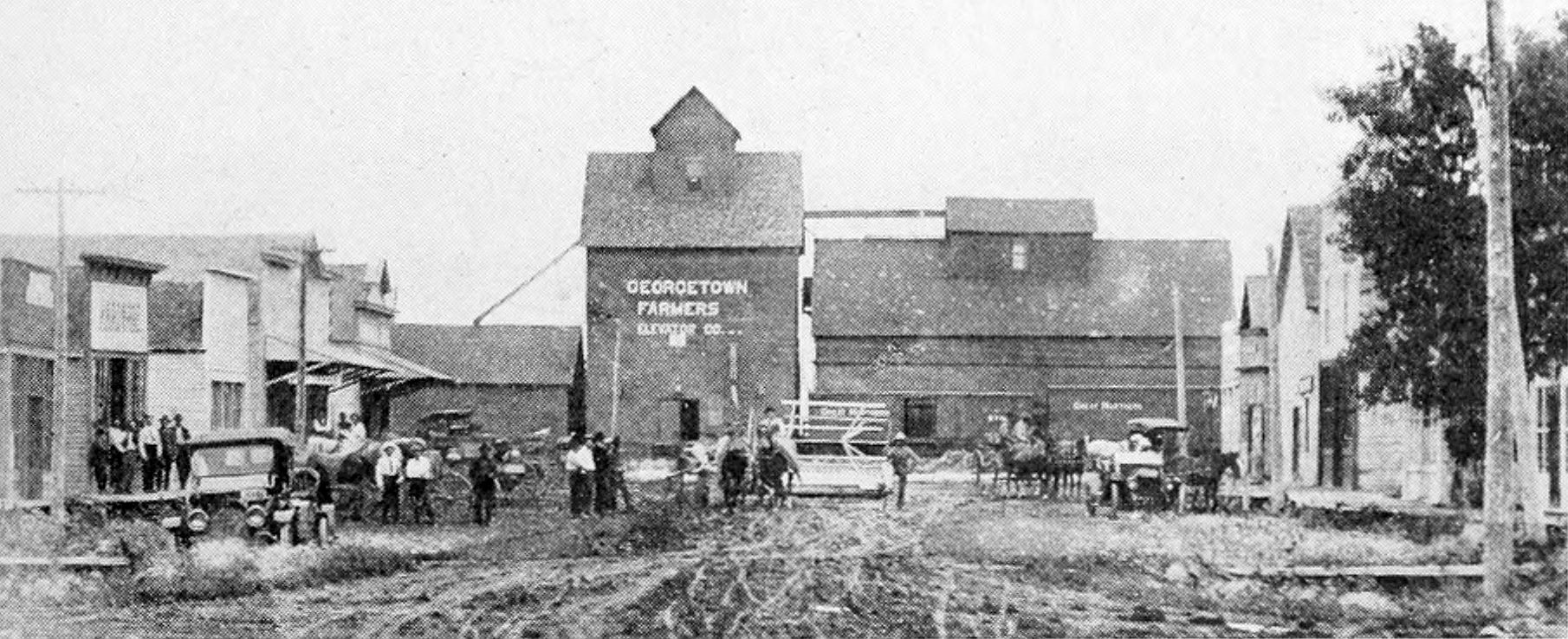
- Georgetown, 1916

- Location of Georgetown, Minnesota
- Coordinates: 47°04′42″N 96°47′45″W
- Country: United States
- State: Minnesota
- County: Clay
- Incorporated: March 10, 1904

Government
  - Mayor: Robert J. Hermann

Area
  - Total: 1.019 sq mi (2.639 km^{2})
  - Land: 1.019 sq mi (2.639 km^{2})
  - Water: 0 sq mi (0.000 km^{2})
- Elevation: 883 ft (269 m)

Population (2020)
  - Total: 86
  - Estimate (2022): 88
  - Density: 84.4/sq mi (32.58/km^{2})
- Time zone: UTC−6 (Central (CST))
  - Summer (DST): UTC−5 (CDT)
- ZIP Code: 56546
- Area code: 218
- FIPS code: 27-23498
- GNIS feature ID: 2394883
- Sales tax: 7.375%

Georgetown is a city in Clay County, Minnesota, United States, along the Buffalo River near its confluence with the Red River of the North. The population was 86 at the 2020 census.

== History ==
Georgetown, Minnesota, 1907

Georgetown was established in 1859 as a trading post and company town for the Hudson's Bay Company. It served as the relay post for good traveling from Canada south to St. Cloud. In 1862, Georgetown was the northwestern most city in Minnesota. The city was evacuated during the U.S.-Dakota War of 1862, following the Dakota laying siege to Fort Abercrombie, the nearest settlement. The evacuees were lead north by Joe Rolette. Only two families would return to Georgetown after the war, despite the city never being attacked. A post office called Georgetown began operation in 1864. The city's importance began to decline with the arrival of railroads, and lower water levels making Red River transportation more difficult. The city moved further away from the river as its importance waned.

== Geography ==
According to the United States Census Bureau, the city has a total area of 1.019 square miles (2.64 km^{2}), all land.

=== Climate ===
Climate data for Georgetown 1 E, Minnesota (1991–2020 normals, extremes 1962–present)
Month	Jan	Feb	Mar	Apr	May	Jun	Jul	Aug	Sep	Oct	Nov	Dec	Year
Record high °F (°C)	52 (11)	54 (12)	78 (26)	100 (38)	97 (36)	101 (38)	107 (42)	102 (39)	100 (38)	94 (34)	73 (23)	57 (14)	107 (42)
Mean daily maximum °F (°C)	17.3 (−8.2)	22.2 (−5.4)	36.7 (2.6)	54.4 (12.4)	69.2 (20.7)	78.2 (25.7)	82.2 (27.9)	80.9 (27.2)	71.9 (22.2)	56.1 (13.4)	37.6 (3.1)	23.3 (−4.8)	52.5 (11.4)
Daily mean °F (°C)	8.2 (−13.2)	12.8 (−10.7)	27.3 (−2.6)	43.0 (6.1)	56.7 (13.7)	66.9 (19.4)	70.7 (21.5)	68.9 (20.5)	60.1 (15.6)	46.0 (7.8)	29.3 (−1.5)	15.2 (−9.3)	42.1 (5.6)
Mean daily minimum °F (°C)	−0.9 (−18.3)	3.4 (−15.9)	17.9 (−7.8)	31.7 (−0.2)	44.3 (6.8)	55.6 (13.1)	59.3 (15.2)	56.8 (13.8)	48.3 (9.1)	35.9 (2.2)	20.9 (−6.2)	7.1 (−13.8)	31.7 (−0.2)
Record low °F (°C)	−40 (−40)	−42 (−41)	−24 (−31)	−7 (−22)	19 (−7)	31 (−1)	39 (4)	30 (−1)	21 (−6)	6 (−14)	−27 (−33)	−35 (−37)	−42 (−41)
Average precipitation inches (mm)	0.74 (19)	0.72 (18)	1.21 (31)	1.36 (35)	2.86 (73)	4.24 (108)	3.84 (98)	2.96 (75)	2.88 (73)	2.13 (54)	0.77 (20)	0.97 (25)	24.68 (627)
Average snowfall inches (cm)	7.9 (20)	7.5 (19)	5.7 (14)	4.7 (12)	0.0 (0.0)	0.0 (0.0)	0.0 (0.0)	0.0 (0.0)	0.0 (0.0)	1.4 (3.6)	3.5 (8.9)	10.2 (26)	40.9 (104)
Average precipitation days (≥ 0.01 in)	5.3	5.9	4.6	5.0	8.1	10.0	8.2	6.5	5.7	5.6	4.7	6.7	76.3
Average snowy days (≥ 0.1 in)	5.3	5.6	3.7	1.1	0.0	0.0	0.0	0.0	0.0	0.6	3.6	6.6	26.5
Source: NOAA

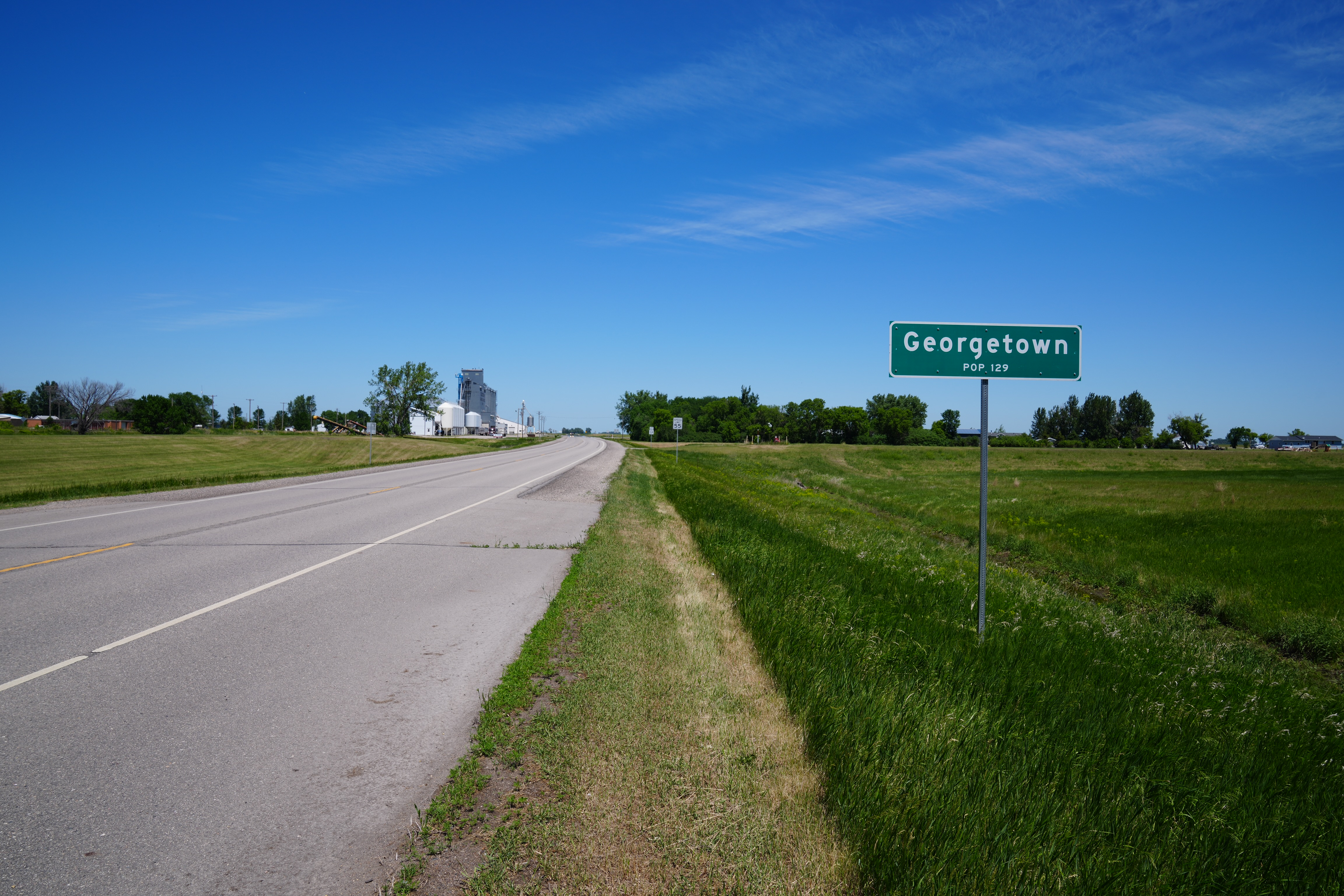
Georgetown is on U.S. Route 75

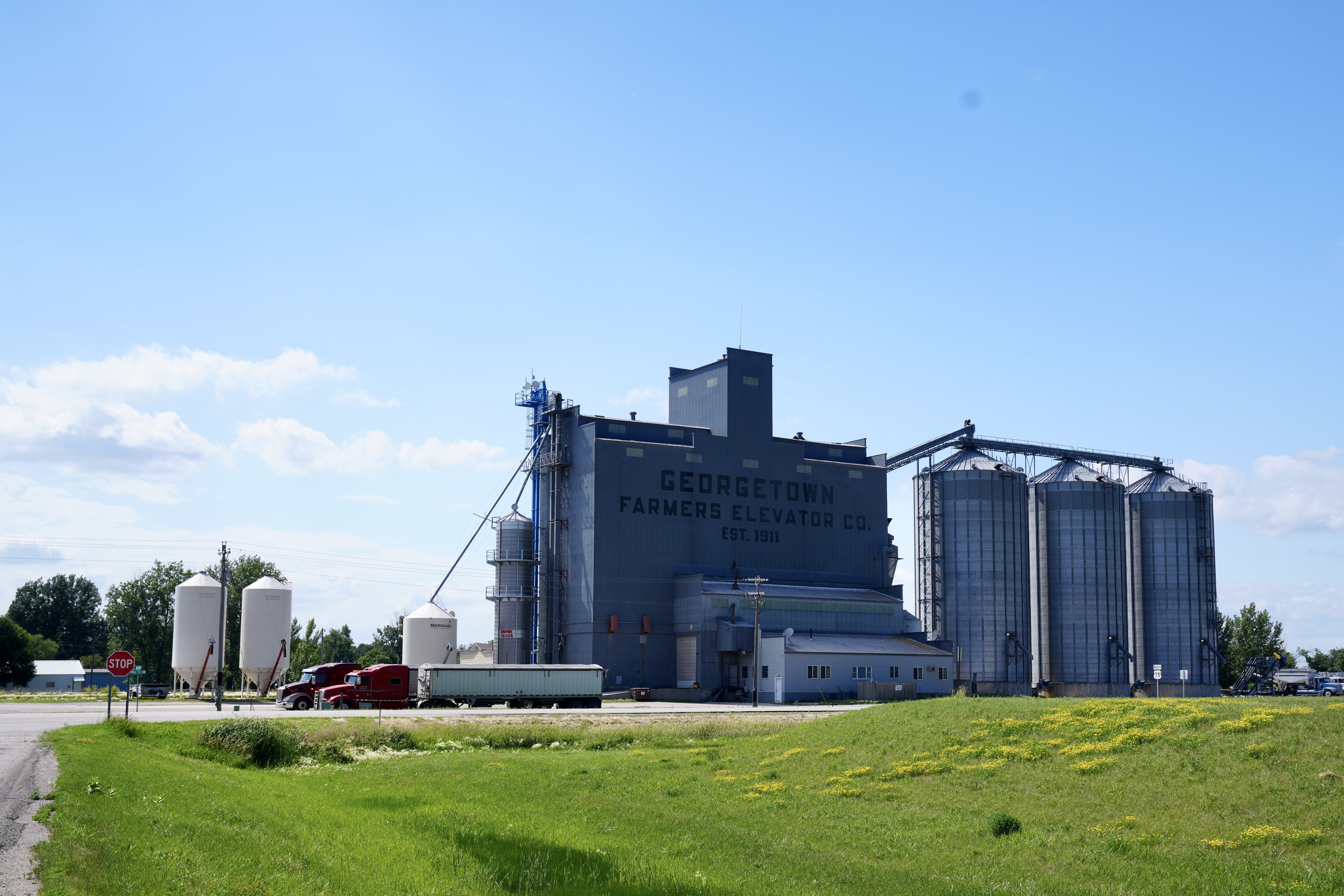
Georgetown Farmers Elevator Co. Established in 1911

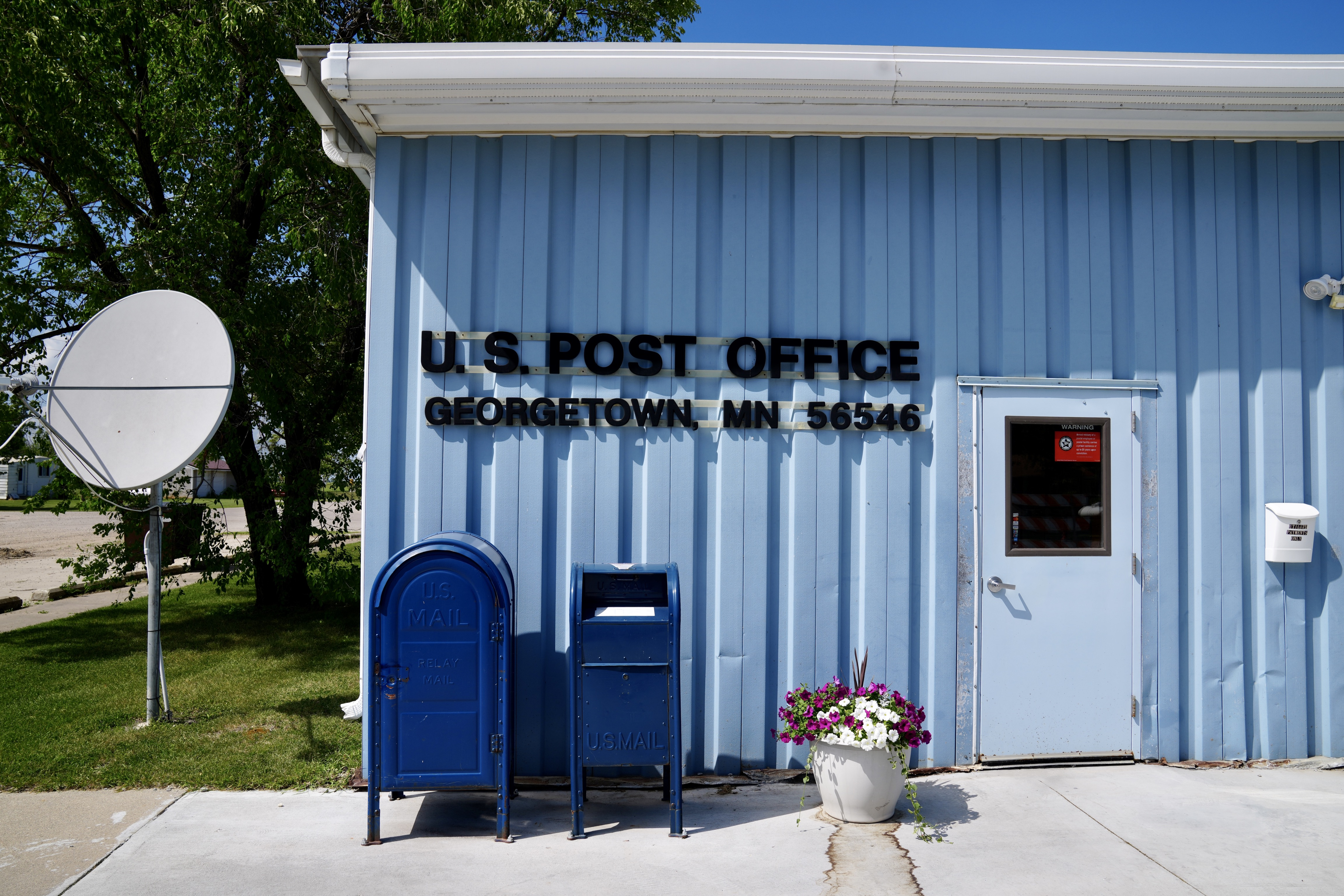
US. Post Office, Georgetown, MN 56546

== Demographics ==
Historical population
Census	Pop.	Note	%±
1910	182		—
1920	136		−25.3%
1930	183		34.6%
1940	193		5.5%
1950	192		−0.5%
1960	178		−7.3%
1970	141		−20.8%
1980	124		−12.1%
1990	107		−13.7%
2000	125		16.8%
2010	129		3.2%
2020	86		−33.3%
2022 (est.)	88		2.3%
U.S. Decennial Census; 2020 Census

=== 2010 census ===
As of the 2010 census, there were 129 people, 48 households, and 33 families living in the city. The population density was 129.0 inhabitants per square mile (49.8/km^{2}). There were 55 housing units at an average density of 55.0 per square mile (21.2/km^{2}). The racial makeup of the city was 95.3% White, 2.3% Native American, 1.6% from other races, and 0.8% from two or more races. Hispanic or Latino of any race were 3.9% of the population.

There were 48 households, of which 37.5% had children under the age of 18 living with them, 60.4% were married couples living together, 8.3% had a male householder with no wife present, and 31.3% were non-families. 25.0% of all households were made up of individuals, and 10.5% had someone living alone who was 65 years of age or older. The average household size was 2.69 and the average family size was 3.27.

The median age in the city was 37.6 years. 31.8% of residents were under the age of 18; 4.6% were between the ages of 18 and 24; 29.6% were from 25 to 44; 27.9% were from 45 to 64; and 6.2% were 65 years of age or older. The gender makeup of the city was 54.3% male and 45.7% female.

=== 2000 census ===
As of the 2000 census, there were 125 people, 50 households, and 39 families living in the city. The population density was 124.7 inhabitants per square mile (48.1/km^{2}). There were 56 housing units at an average density of 55.9 per square mile (21.6/km^{2}). The racial makeup of the city was 99.20% White, and 0.80% from two or more races. Hispanic or Latino of any race were 3.20% of the population.

There were 50 households, out of which 36.0% had children under the age of 18 living with them, 70.0% were married couples living together, 2.0% had a female householder with no husband present, and 22.0% were non-families. 14.0% of all households were made up of individuals, and 6.0% had someone living alone who was 65 years of age or older. The average household size was 2.50 and the average family size was 2.82.

In the city, the population was spread out, with 24.0% under the age of 18, 7.2% from 18 to 24, 36.0% from 25 to 44, 20.8% from 45 to 64, and 12.0% who were 65 years of age or older. The median age was 36 years. For every 100 females, there were 111.9 males. For every 100 females age 18 and over, there were 126.2 males.

The median income for a household in the city was $35,625, and the median income for a family was $40,313. Males had a median income of $40,625 versus $22,500 for females. The per capita income for the city was $17,043. There were no families and 1.7% of the population living below the poverty line, including no under eighteens and 13.3% of those over 64.
