= Keene Township, Clay County, Minnesota =

Township in Minnesota, United States

Keene Township
- Township
- Location of Keene Township, within Clay County, Minnesota
- Coordinates: 47°1′1″N 96°22′29″W
- Country: United States
- State: Minnesota
- County: Clay

Area
  - Total: 32.5 sq mi (84.3 km^{2})
  - Land: 32.4 sq mi (83.8 km^{2})
  - Water: 0.19 sq mi (0.5 km^{2})
- Elevation: 1,145 ft (349 m)

Population (2020)
  - Total: 153
  - Density: 4.73/sq mi (1.83/km^{2})
- Time zone: UTC-6 (Central (CST))
  - Summer (DST): UTC-5 (CDT)
- FIPS code: 27-32552
- GNIS feature ID: 0664604

Keene Township is a township in Clay County, Minnesota, United States. The population was 153 at the 2020 census.

== History ==
Keene Township was named for a pioneer settler.

== Geography ==
According to the United States Census Bureau, the township has a total area of 32.5 square miles (84 km^{2}), of which 32.4 square miles (84 km^{2}) is land and 0.2 square miles (0.52 km^{2}) (0.55%) is water.

== Demographics ==
As of the census of 2000, there were 128 people, 47 households, and 36 families residing in the township. The population density was 4.0 inhabitants per square mile (1.5/km^{2}). There were 51 housing units at an average density of 1.6 per square mile (0.62/km^{2}). The racial makeup of the township was 97.66% White, and 2.34% from two or more races. Hispanic or Latino of any race were 2.34% of the population.

There were 47 households, out of which 31.9% had children under the age of 18 living with them, 66.0% were married couples living together, 6.4% had a female householder with no husband present, and 23.4% were non-families. 21.3% of all households were made up of individuals, and 8.5% had someone living alone who was 65 years of age or older. The average household size was 2.70 and the average family size was 3.17.

In the township the population was spread out, with 28.9% under the age of 18, 5.5% from 18 to 24, 21.9% from 25 to 44, 24.2% from 45 to 64, and 19.5% who were 65 years of age or older. The median age was 38 years. For every 100 females, there were 156.0 males. For every 100 females age 18 and over, there were 139.5 males.

The median income for a household in the township was $40,625, and the median income for a family was $41,875. Males had a median income of $29,167 versus $28,125 for females. The per capita income for the township was $16,748. There were 9.7% of families and 11.8% of the population living below the poverty line, including no under eighteens and 24.0% of those over 64.
