= Kragnes Township, Clay County, Minnesota =

Township in Minnesota, United States

Kragnes Township
- Township
- Location of Kragnes Township, within Clay County, Minnesota

- Location within the state of Minnesota Kragnes Township (the United States)
- Coordinates: 47°1′5″N 96°45′38″W
- Country: United States
- State: Minnesota
- County: Clay

Area
  - Total: 38.2 sq mi (98.9 km^{2})
  - Land: 38.2 sq mi (98.9 km^{2})
  - Water: 0 sq mi (0.0 km^{2})
- Elevation: 892 ft (272 m)

Population (2020)
  - Total: 255
  - Density: 6.68/sq mi (2.58/km^{2})
- Time zone: UTC-6 (Central (CST))
  - Summer (DST): UTC-5 (CDT)
- ZIP code: 56560
- Area code: 218
- FIPS code: 27-33704
- GNIS feature ID: 0664644

Kragnes Township is a township in Clay County, Minnesota, United States. The population was 255 at the 2020 census.

== History ==
Kragnes Township was organized on January 27, 1880 at the home of A. O. Kragnes, for whom it was named. Mr. Kragnes was a Norwegian immigrant and the first permanent settler in the township, in 1875. The first officers of the township board were Kittil T. Eiken, Supervisor and Chairman of the Board; Aanund O. Kragnes, Supervisor; Aadne H. Breiland, Supervisor; John O. Juve, Clerk; Mikel Larson, Treasurer (replaced soon after by Mikel Rifshel). The first secondary officers (non-board positions) of the township were Charles A. Brendemuhl, Sr., Assessor; Nils Nordness and G. T. Eiken, Justices of the Peace; H. Jacob Wentzell, Torstein O. Rice, and Peder M. Tufton, Constables.

== Geography ==
According to the United States Census Bureau, the township has a total area of 38.2 square miles (99 km^{2}), all land.

== Demographics ==
As of the census of 2000, there were 319 people, 114 households, and 97 families residing in the township. The population density was 8.4 inhabitants per square mile (3.2/km^{2}). There were 123 housing units at an average density of 3.2 per square mile (1.2/km^{2}). The racial makeup of the township was 97.18% White, 0.31% African American, 0.94% Asian, 1.25% from other races, and 0.31% from two or more races. Hispanic or Latino of any race were 2.51% of the population.

There were 114 households, out of which 36.0% had children under the age of 18 living with them, 79.8% were married couples living together, 4.4% had a female householder with no husband present, and 14.9% were non-families. 10.5% of all households were made up of individuals, and 2.6% had someone living alone who was 65 years of age or older. The average household size was 2.80 and the average family size was 3.00.

In the township the population was spread out, with 27.6% under the age of 18, 6.3% from 18 to 24, 28.2% from 25 to 44, 29.2% from 45 to 64, and 8.8% who were 65 years of age or older. The median age was 38 years. For every 100 females, there were 114.1 males. For every 100 females age 18 and over, there were 111.9 males.

The median income for a household in the township was $53,571, and the median income for a family was $54,286. Males had a median income of $41,786 versus $23,750 for females. The per capita income for the township was $21,006. About 4.3% of families and 4.7% of the population were below the poverty line, including 2.1% of those under age 18 and none of those age 65 or over.
