= Hawley Township, Clay County, Minnesota =

Township in Minnesota, United States

Hawley Township
- Township
- Location of Hawley Township, within Clay County, Minnesota

- Location within the state of Minnesota Hawley Township (the United States)
- Coordinates: 46°51′26″N 96°22′3″W
- Country: United States
- State: Minnesota
- County: Clay

Area
  - Total: 31.2 sq mi (80.9 km^{2})
  - Land: 30.7 sq mi (79.5 km^{2})
  - Water: 0.54 sq mi (1.4 km^{2})
- Elevation: 1,120 ft (340 m)

Population (2020)
  - Total: 491
  - Density: 16.0/sq mi (6.18/km^{2})
- Time zone: UTC-6 (Central (CST))
  - Summer (DST): UTC-5 (CDT)
- ZIP code: 56549
- Area code: 218
- FIPS code: 27-27764
- GNIS feature ID: 0664420
- Website: https://hawleytownship.com/

Hawley Township is a township in Clay County, Minnesota, United States. The population was 491 at the 2020 census.

== Geography ==
According to the United States Census Bureau, the township has a total area of 31.2 square miles (81 km^{2}), of which 30.7 square miles (80 km^{2}) is land and 0.5 square miles (1.3 km^{2}) (1.66%) is water.

== Demographics ==
As of the census of 2000, there were 459 people, 147 households, and 123 families residing in the township. The population density was 14.9 inhabitants per square mile (5.8/km^{2}). There were 153 housing units at an average density of 5.0 per square mile (1.9/km^{2}). The racial makeup of the township was 98.91% White, 0.22% African American and 0.87% Native American. Hispanic or Latino of any race were 0.22% of the population.

There were 147 households, out of which 46.9% had children under the age of 18 living with them, 71.4% were married couples living together, 8.2% had a female householder with no husband present, and 16.3% were non-families. 11.6% of all households were made up of individuals, and 2.0% had someone living alone who was 65 years of age or older. The average household size was 3.12 and the average family size was 3.42.

In the township the population was spread out, with 32.2% under the age of 18, 6.3% from 18 to 24, 29.8% from 25 to 44, 24.2% from 45 to 64, and 7.4% who were 65 years of age or older. The median age was 37 years. For every 100 females, there were 125.0 males. For every 100 females age 18 and over, there were 111.6 males.

The median income for a household in the township was $54,886, and the median income for a family was $59,375. Males had a median income of $32,337 versus $25,000 for females. The per capita income for the township was $18,252. About 6.0% of families and 7.8% of the population were below the poverty line, including 8.5% of those under age 18 and 15.8% of those age 65 or over.
