= Oakport Township, Clay County, Minnesota =

Township in Minnesota, United States

Oakport Township, Minnesota
- Township
- Location of Oakport Township, within Clay County, Minnesota

- Location within Minnesota Location within the United States
- Coordinates: 46.9416°N 96.7251°W
- Country: United States
- State: Minnesota
- County: Clay

Area
  - Total: 26.507 sq mi (68.652 km^{2})
  - Land: 26.507 sq mi (68.652 km^{2})
  - Water: 0 sq mi (0.000 km^{2}) 0.00%
- Elevation: 899 ft (274 m)

Population (2020)
  - Total: 506
  - Estimate (2025): 507
  - Density: 19.1/sq mi (7.37/km^{2})
- Time zone: UTC–6 (Central (CST))
  - Summer (DST): UTC–5 (CDT)
- ZIP Code: 58560
- Area code: 218
- FIPS code: 27-027-47932
- GNIS feature ID: 665193

Oakport Township is a township in Clay County, Minnesota, United States. The population was 506 as of the 2020 census, and was estimated at 507 in 2025.

== History ==
In 1990, Oakport Township reached an orderly annexation agreement whereby developed portions of the Township (Tract 2) entered the city of Moorhead on January 1, 2015.

== Geography ==
According to the United States Census Bureau, the township has a total area of 26.507 square miles (68.65 km^{2}), all land.

== Demographics ==
Historical population
Census	Pop.	Note	%±
1890	176		—
1900	276		56.8%
1910	281		1.8%
1920	306		8.9%
1930	348		13.7%
1940	341		−2.0%
1950	561		64.5%
1960	950		69.3%
1970	1,265		33.2%
1980	1,714		35.5%
1990	1,386		−19.1%
2000	1,689		21.9%
2010	1,797		6.4%
2020	506		−71.8%
2025 (est.)	507		0.2%
Historical Census Data 1890 to 2020; U.S. Decennial Census; 2020 Census

As of the 2024 American Community Survey, there were 179 estimated households in Oakport Township with an average of 2.49 persons per household. The township has a median household income of $114,519. Approximately 2.9% of the township's population lives at or below the poverty line. Oakport Township has an estimated 67.3% employment rate, with 46.5% of the population holding a bachelor's degree or higher and 99.0% holding a high school diploma. There were 194 housing units at an average density of 7.32 per square mile (2.83/km^{2}).

The top five reported languages (people were allowed to report up to two languages, thus the figures will generally add to more than 100%) were English (97.0%), Spanish (2.5%), Indo-European (0.5%), Asian and Pacific Islander (0.0%), and Other (0.0%).

The median age in the township was 44.8 years.

=== 2020 census ===
As of the 2020 census, there were 506 people, 169 households, and 145 families residing in the township. The population density was 19.09 inhabitants per square mile (7.37/km^{2}). There were 181 housing units at an average density of 6.83 per square mile (2.64/km^{2}). The racial makeup of the township was 97.23% White, 0.20% African American, 0.40% Native American, 0.00% Asian, 0.00% Pacific Islander, 0.20% from some other races and 1.98% from two or more races. Hispanic or Latino people of any race were 1.58% of the population.

=== 2010 census ===
As of the 2010 census, there were 1,797 people, 626 households, and 539 families residing in the township. The population density was 61.89 inhabitants per square mile (23.90/km^{2}). There were 667 housing units at an average density of 22.97 per square mile (8.87/km^{2}). The racial makeup of the township was 98.33% White, 0.33% African American, 0.28% Native American, 0.00% Asian, 0.00% Pacific Islander, 0.00% from some other races and 1.06% from two or more races. Hispanic or Latino people of any race were 0.95% of the population.

=== 2000 census ===
As of the 2000 census, there were 1,689 people, 572 households, and 498 families residing in the township. The population density was 57.84 inhabitants per square mile (22.33/km^{2}). There were 589 housing units at an average density of 20.17 per square mile (7.79/km^{2}). The racial makeup of the township was 97.99% White, 0.36% African American, 0.36% Native American, 0.06% Asian, 0.00% Pacific Islander, 0.12% from some other races and 1.12% from two or more races. Hispanic or Latino people of any race were 0.71% of the population.

There were 572 households, out of which 43.4% had children under the age of 18 living with them, 80.4% were married couples living together, 4.4% had a female householder with no husband present, and 12.9% were non-families. 11.5% of all households were made up of individuals, and 4.4% had someone living alone who was 65 years of age or older. The average household size was 2.93 and the average family size was 3.13.

In the township, the population was spread out, with 30.0% under the age of 18, 5.9% from 18 to 24, 30.4% from 25 to 44, 24.7% from 45 to 64, and 9.1% who were 65 years of age or older. The median age was 38 years. For every 100 females, there were 107.2 males. For every 100 females age 18 and over, there were 102.6 males.

The median income for a household in the township was $60,400, and the median income for a family was $62,794. Males had a median income of $41,856 versus $26,842 for females. The per capita income for the township was $21,570. About 2.8% of families and 4.5% of the population were below the poverty line, including 4.9% of those under age 18 and 7.0% of those age 65 or over.
