= Clay County, Minnesota =

County in Minnesota, United States

- County
- Clay County Courthouse in Moorhead

- Location within the U.S. state of Minnesota
- Coordinates: 46.898377°N 96.494901°W
- Country: United States
- State: Minnesota
- Founded: March 8, 1862 (created); February 27, 1872 (organized)
- Named for: Henry Clay
- Seat: Moorhead
- Largest city: Moorhead

Area
  - Total: 1,052.629 sq mi (2,726.30 km^{2})
  - Land: 1,045.176 sq mi (2,706.99 km^{2})
  - Water: 7.453 sq mi (19.30 km^{2}) 0.71%

Population (2020)
  - Total: 65,318
  - Estimate (2025): 67,734 ▲
  - Density: 64.8/sq mi (25.0/km^{2})
- Time zone: UTC−6 (Central)
  - Summer (DST): UTC−5 (CDT)
- Area code: 218
- Congressional district: 7th
- Website: claycountymn.gov

Clay County is a county in the U.S. state of Minnesota. As of the 2020 census, the population was 65,318, and was estimated to be 67,734 in 2025. Its county seat is Moorhead.

Clay County is part of the Fargo, ND-MN Metropolitan Statistical Area.

== History ==
Breckenridge County was created on March 18, 1858. Clay County was established on November 2, 1860 as Breckinridge County and named for John C. Breckinridge, vice president of the United States from 1857 to 1861. After the Civil War began, Breckinridge joined the Confederate Army and in March 1862 the state Legislature replaced the name of Breckinridge with that of Henry Clay (1777–1852), who like Breckinridge was from Lexington, Ky., and was known "The Great Pacificator" or "The Great Compromiser" who helped head off civil war at least twice. The county's government was not organized until 1872, after the Northern Pacific Railway reached the area and settlement accelerated.

== Geography ==
Soils of Clay County

Clay County lies on the western side of Minnesota. Its western boundary line abuts the eastern boundary line of the state of North Dakota (across the Red River). The Red River flows northward along the western boundary line of the county, on its way to the Hudson Bay in Canada. The Buffalo River flows west-northwesterly through the center of the county, joined by the South Branch Buffalo River west of Glyndon, before discharging into the Red on the county's western border near Georgetown. The terrain consists of rolling hills, dotted with lakes and ponds in its eastern portion. The terrain slopes to the west and north, with its highest point near the southeastern corner, at 1,430 ft (440 m) ASL.

According to the United States Census Bureau, the county has a total area of 1,052.629 square miles (2,726.30 km^{2}), of which 1,045.176 square miles (2,706.99 km^{2}) is land and 7.453 square miles (19.30 km^{2}) (0.71%) is water. It is the 19th largest county in Minnesota by total area.

=== Major highways ===
- I-94
- US 10
- US 52
- US 75
- MN 9
- MN 32
- MN 34
- MN 336

=== Transit ===
- MATBUS
- Jefferson Lines

=== Adjacent counties ===
- Norman County - north
- Becker County - east
- Otter Tail County - southeast
- Wilkin County - south
- Richland County, North Dakota - southwest
- Cass County, North Dakota - west

=== Protected areas ===
- Aspen State Wildlife Management Area
- Bjornson State Wildlife Management Area
- Bluestone Prairie Scientific and Natural Area
- Clay County State Wildlife Management Area
- Cromwell State Wildlife Management Area
- Felton Prairie Scientific and Natural Area
- Goose Prairie State Wildlife Management Area
- Gruhl State Wildlife Management Area
- Hawley State Wildlife Management Area
- Hay Creek State Wildlife Management Area
- Highland State Wildlife Management Area
- Hitterdal State Wildlife Management Area
- Jeral State Wildlife Management Area
- Magnusson State Wildlife Management Area
- Skree State Wildlife Management Area
- Ulen State Wildlife Management Area
- Ulen Wildlife Refuge

== Climate and weather ==
Moorhead, Minnesota

Climate chart (precipitation, max. and min. temperature)
J	F	M	A	M	J	J	A	S	O	N	D
0.7 18 0	0.6 24 6	1.3 36 19	1.4 56 33	2.8 69 45	3.9 77 55	2.8 82 60	2.6 81 57	2.6 71 47	2.2 56 35	1 37 20	0.8 22 6
- █ Average max. and min. temperatures in °F
- █ Precipitation totals in inches
- Source: The Weather Channel
Metric conversion
J	F	M	A	M	J	J	A	S	O	N	D
18 −8 −18	16 −4 −14	33 2 −7	35 13 1	71 21 7	99 25 13	71 28 16	65 27 14	65 22 8	55 13 2	25 3 −7	21 −6 −14
- █ Average max. and min. temperatures in °C
- █ Precipitation totals in mm

In recent years, average temperatures in the county seat of Moorhead have ranged from a low of 0 °F (−18 °C) in January to a high of 82 °F (28 °C) in July, although a record low of −48 °F (−44 °C) was recorded in January 1887 and a record high of 114 °F (46 °C) was recorded in July 1936, the latter also the highest recorded temperature in the history of Minnesota. Average monthly precipitation ranged from 0.64 inches (16 mm) in February to 3.90 inches (99 mm) in June.

== Demographics ==
Historical population
Census	Pop.	Note	%±
1860	72		—
1870	92		27.8%
1880	5,887		6,298.9%
1890	11,517		95.6%
1900	17,942		55.8%
1910	19,640		9.5%
1920	21,780		10.9%
1930	23,120		6.2%
1940	25,337		9.6%
1950	30,363		19.8%
1960	39,080		28.7%
1970	46,585		19.2%
1980	49,327		5.9%
1990	50,422		2.2%
2000	51,229		1.6%
2010	58,999		15.2%
2020	65,318		10.7%
2025 (est.)	67,734	▲	3.7%
U.S. Decennial Census:

As of the third quarter of 2024, the median home value in Clay County was $281,040.

As of the 2023 American Community Survey, there are 25,939 estimated households in Clay County with an average of 2.41 persons per household. The county has a median household income of $77,664. Approximately 13.1% of the county's population lives at or below the poverty line. Clay County has an estimated 70.5% employment rate, with 39.0% of the population holding a bachelor's degree or higher and 95.0% holding a high school diploma.

The median age in the county was 34.1 years.

=== Racial and ethnic composition ===
Clay County, Minnesota – racial and ethnic composition
Note: the US Census treats Hispanic/Latino as an ethnic category. This table excludes Latinos from the racial categories and assigns them to a separate category. Hispanics/Latinos may be of any race.

Race / ethnicity (NH = non-Hispanic)	Pop. 1980	Pop. 1990	Pop. 2000	Pop. 2010	Pop. 2020
White alone (NH)	48,210 (97.74%)	48,111 (95.42%)	47,330 (92.39%)	53,434 (90.57%)	54,424 (83.32%)
Black or African American alone (NH)	145 (0.29%)	164 (0.33%)	261 (0.51%)	825 (1.40%)	3,141 (4.81%)
Native American or Alaska Native alone (NH)	202 (0.41%)	537 (1.07%)	688 (1.34%)	744 (1.26%)	1,032 (1.58%)
Asian alone (NH)	171 (0.35%)	394 (0.78%)	439 (0.86%)	836 (1.42%)	764 (1.17%)
Pacific Islander alone (NH)	—	—	14 (0.03%)	17 (0.03%)	16 (0.02%)
Other race alone (NH)	115 (0.23%)	37 (0.07%)	14 (0.03%)	38 (0.06%)	134 (0.21%)
Mixed race or multiracial (NH)	—	—	611 (1.19%)	1,049 (1.78%)	2,796 (4.28%)
Hispanic or Latino (any race)	484 (0.98%)	1,179 (2.34%)	1,872 (3.65%)	2,056 (3.48%)	3,011 (4.61%)
Total	49,327 (100.00%)	50,422 (100.00%)	51,229 (100.00%)	58,999 (100.00%)	65,318 (100.00%)

=== 2023 estimate ===
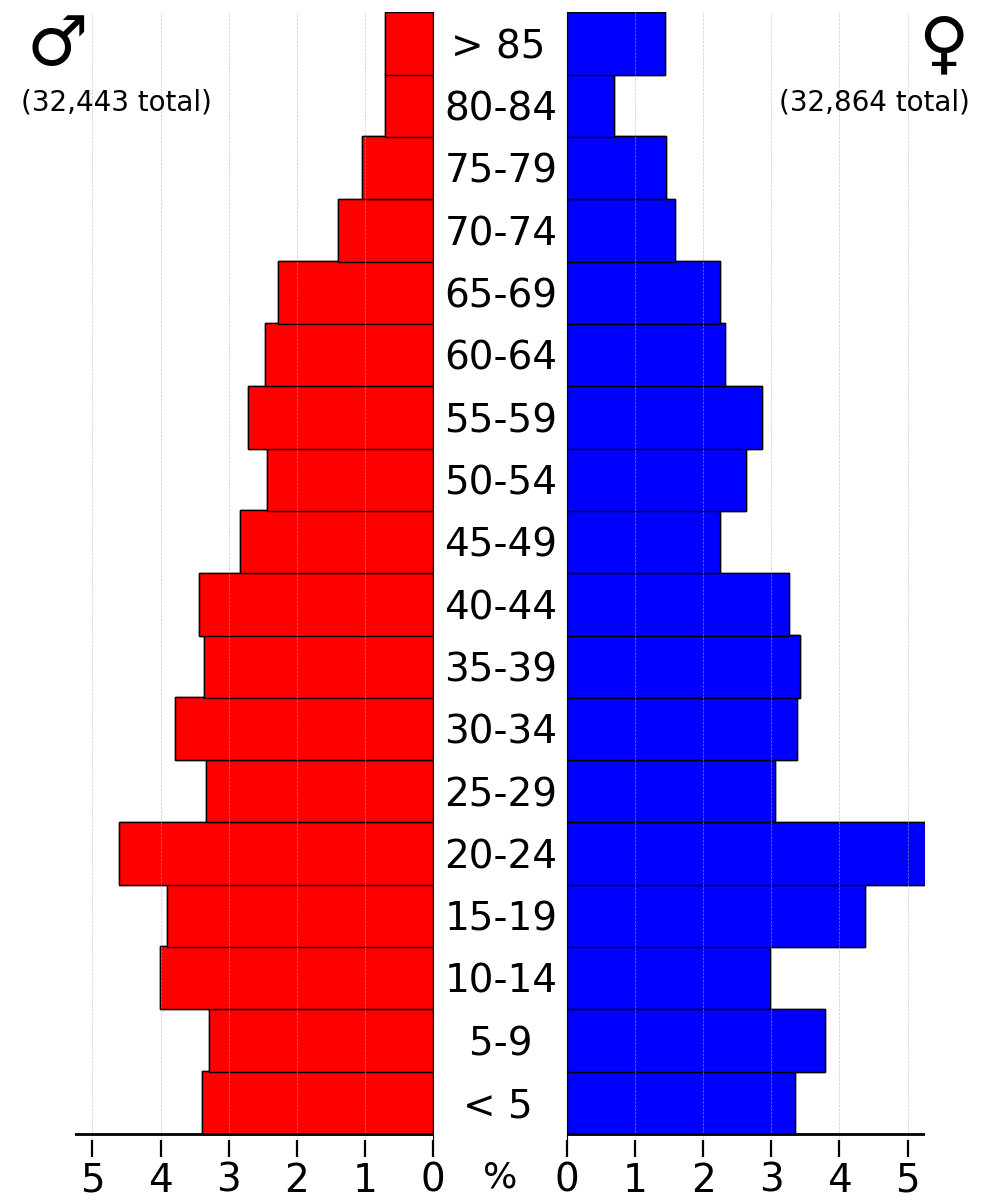
2022 US Census population pyramid for Clay County, from ACS 5-year estimates

As of the 2023 estimate, there were 66,258 people and 25,939 households residing in the county. There were 27,851 housing units. The racial makeup of the county was 87.9% White (84.0% NH White), 5.7% African American, 2.0% Native American, 1.4% Asian, 0.1% Pacific Islander, _% from some other races and 2.9% from two or more races. Hispanic or Latino people of any race were 5.1% of the population.

In the 2023 estimate, Clay County is the 68th wealthiest county in Minnesota. $53,925 for per capita income.

=== 2020 census ===
As of the 2020 census, the county had a population of 65,318. The median age was 33.9 years. 25.2% of residents were under the age of 18 and 13.9% of residents were 65 years of age or older. For every 100 females there were 98.6 males, and for every 100 females age 18 and over there were 95.9 males age 18 and over.

The racial makeup of the county was 84.9% White, 4.9% Black or African American, 1.8% American Indian and Alaska Native, 1.2% Asian, <0.1% Native Hawaiian and Pacific Islander, 1.3% from some other race, and 5.9% from two or more races. Hispanic or Latino residents of any race comprised 4.6% of the population.

74.2% of residents lived in urban areas, while 25.8% lived in rural areas.

There were 24,931 households in the county, of which 32.4% had children under the age of 18 living in them. Of all households, 48.2% were married-couple households, 19.7% were households with a male householder and no spouse or partner present, and 24.7% were households with a female householder and no spouse or partner present. About 29.2% of all households were made up of individuals and 11.0% had someone living alone who was 65 years of age or older.

There were 26,844 housing units, of which 7.1% were vacant. Among occupied housing units, 66.3% were owner-occupied and 33.7% were renter-occupied. The homeowner vacancy rate was 1.5% and the rental vacancy rate was 10.3%.

=== 2010 census ===
As of the 2010 census, there were 58,999 people, 22,279 households, and _ families residing in the county. The population density was 56.4 inhabitants per square mile (21.8/km^{2}). There were 23,959 housing units at an average density of 22.92 per square mile (8.8/km^{2}). The racial makeup of the county was 92.69% White, 1.43% African American, 1.36% Native American, 1.43% Asian, 0.04% Pacific Islander, 0.89% from some other races and 2.16% from two or more races. Hispanic or Latino people of any race were 3.48% of the population.

=== 2000 census ===
As of the 2000 census, there were 51,229 people, 18,670 households, and 12,340 families residing in the county. The population density was 49.0 inhabitants per square mile (18.9/km^{2}). There were 19,746 housing units at an average density of 18.9 per square mile (7.3/km^{2}). The racial makeup of the county was 93.99% White, 0.52% African American, 1.44% Native American, 0.88% Asian, 0.03% Pacific Islander, 1.67% from some other races and 1.47% from two or more races. Hispanic or Latino people of any race were 3.65% of the population.

In terms of ancestry, 40.4% were of Norwegian and 26.8% German.

There were 18,670 households, out of which 33.80% had children under the age of 18 living with them, 53.90% were married couples living together, 8.80% had a female householder with no husband present, and 33.90% were non-families. 26.10% of all households were made up of individuals, and 10.60% had someone living alone who was 65 years of age or older. The average household size was 2.53 and the average family size was 3.07.

The county population contained 25.00% under the age of 18, 17.10% from 18 to 24, 25.70% from 25 to 44, 19.30% from 45 to 64, and 12.90% who were 65 years of age or older. The median age was 32 years. For every 100 females, there were 93.70 males. For every 100 females age 18 and over, there were 89.10 males.

The median income for a household in the county was $37,889, and the median income for a family was $49,192. Males had a median income of $34,176 versus $23,149 for females. The per capita income for the county was $17,557. About 7.40% of families and 13.20% of the population were below the poverty line, including 13.30% of those under age 18 and 7.50% of those age 65 or over.

== Government and politics ==
In national elections, Clay County has been a Democratic-leaning swing county for several decades. From 1992 to 2020, it voted for the winner of the presidential election. Since 1928, the only years in which Clay did not go for the election winner were 1960, 1968, 1988 and 2024. The presence of college town Moorhead and proximity to Fargo, North Dakota makes the county more liberal than others in western Minnesota.

United States presidential election results for Clay County, Minnesota
Year	Republican		Democratic		Third party(ies)	
Year	No.	%	No.	%	No.	%
1892	959	40.19%	594	24.90%	833	34.91%
1896	1,594	44.38%	1,908	53.12%	90	2.51%
1900	1,903	59.45%	1,165	36.39%	133	4.15%
1904	2,185	78.15%	388	13.88%	223	7.98%
1908	1,857	58.69%	1,125	35.56%	182	5.75%
1912	549	17.99%	942	30.87%	1,561	51.15%
1916	1,549	44.79%	1,716	49.62%	193	5.58%
1920	4,943	73.00%	1,335	19.72%	493	7.28%
1924	3,081	44.55%	439	6.35%	3,396	49.10%
1928	5,057	61.13%	3,128	37.81%	87	1.05%
1932	2,556	29.16%	5,938	67.75%	270	3.08%
1936	2,880	29.93%	6,282	65.29%	459	4.77%
1940	4,450	41.23%	6,295	58.32%	48	0.44%
1944	4,392	45.40%	5,230	54.06%	52	0.54%
1948	4,302	38.60%	6,624	59.43%	219	1.97%
1952	7,178	58.67%	5,036	41.16%	20	0.16%
1956	6,783	52.77%	6,057	47.12%	15	0.12%
1960	8,278	53.26%	7,241	46.58%	25	0.16%
1964	6,085	37.37%	10,161	62.39%	39	0.24%
1968	7,910	47.77%	7,987	48.23%	663	4.00%
1972	11,089	54.36%	9,076	44.49%	235	1.15%
1976	10,317	47.53%	10,876	50.10%	515	2.37%
1980	10,447	46.41%	8,940	39.72%	3,121	13.87%
1984	11,565	52.62%	10,294	46.84%	119	0.54%
1988	10,380	47.82%	11,186	51.54%	139	0.64%
1992	9,666	41.17%	9,845	41.93%	3,967	16.90%
1996	8,764	41.11%	10,476	49.14%	2,079	9.75%
2000	11,712	50.14%	10,128	43.36%	1,518	6.50%
2004	14,365	51.79%	12,989	46.83%	383	1.38%
2008	11,978	40.94%	16,666	56.96%	615	2.10%
2012	12,920	44.73%	15,208	52.65%	758	2.62%
2016	13,543	46.07%	12,971	44.12%	2,884	9.81%
2020	15,043	46.66%	16,357	50.74%	839	2.60%
2024	15,965	48.56%	16,121	49.04%	788	2.40%

County Board of Commissioners
District	Commissioner	Assumed office	Current term ends
1st	Paul Krabbenhoft (Vice-Chair)	2021	January 2029
2nd	Ezra Baer	2025	January 2029
3rd	Jenny Mongeau (Board Chair)	2015	January 2027
4th	Kevin Campbell	2003	January 2027
5th	David Ebinger	2025	January 2029

State Legislature (2023–2025)
Position	Name	Affiliation	District
Senate	Rob Kupec	DFL	District 4
House of Representatives	Heather Keeler	DFL	District 4A
House of Representatives	Jim Joy	Republican	District 4B

U.S Congress (2023–2025)
Position	Name	Affiliation	District
House of Representatives	Michelle Fischbach	Republican	7th
Senate	Amy Klobuchar	DFL	N/A
Senate	Tina Smith	DFL	N/A

== Communities ==
=== Cities ===
- Barnesville
- Comstock
- Dilworth
- Felton
- Georgetown
- Glyndon
- Hawley
- Hitterdal
- Moorhead (county seat)
- Sabin
- Ulen

=== Census-designated places ===
- Baker

=== Unincorporated communities ===
- Averill
- Dale
- Downer
- Kragnes
- Manitoba Junction
- Muskoda
- Rollag
- Rustad
- Tansem
- Winnipeg Junction

Townships of Clay County

=== Townships ===
- Alliance Township
- Barnesville Township
- Cromwell Township
- Eglon Township
- Elkton Township
- Elmwood Township
- Felton Township
- Flowing Township
- Georgetown Township
- Glyndon Township
- Goose Prairie Township
- Hagen Township
- Hawley Township
- Highland Grove Township
- Holy Cross Township
- Humboldt Township
- Keene Township
- Kragnes Township
- Kurtz Township
- Moland Township
- Moorhead Township
- Morken Township
- Oakport Township
- Parke Township
- Riverton Township
- Skree Township
- Spring Prairie Township
- Tansem Township
- Ulen Township
- Viding Township

=== Former census-designated place ===
- Oakport (part of Moorhead since 2015)

== See also ==
- National Register of Historic Places listings in Clay County, Minnesota
