= List of mayors of Moorhead, Minnesota =

The following is a list of the mayors of Moorhead, Minnesota.

No.	Image	Mayor	Term	Notes	Ref.
1		Henry A. Bruns	1882–1884	Resigned	
2		John Erickson	1884–1885	Elected in special election to fill term	
2		John Erickson	1885–1886		
3		Patrick H. Lamb	1886–1889		
4		Erich Hanson	1889–1891	Died in office	
5		William R. Tillotson	1892–1893		
6		Arthur G. Lewis	1893–1896		
7		Samuel Frazer	1896–1897	Resigned	
-		Jacob Kiefer	1897	Acting mayor	
8		Arthur G. Lewis	1897–1898		
9		Jacob Kiefer	1898–1900		
10		Hans H. Aaker	1900–1901		
11		William R. Tillotson	1901–1903		
12		Ralph Pederson	1903–1905		
13		Carroll A. Nye	1905–1907		
14		Edwin. J. Wheeler	1907–1909		
15		William H. Davy	1909–1913		
16		O. C. Beck	1913–1915		
17		J. W. Vincent	1915–1917		
18		Nels N. Melvy	1917–1919		
19		Dr. Edward W. Humphrey	1919–1921		
20		Clarence I. Evenson	1921–1923		
21		Christian G. Dosland	1923–1927		
22		Dr. Bottolf T. Bottolfson	1927–1929		
23		Herman Nordlie	1929–1931		
24		Clarence I. Evenson	1931–1933		
25		Edward W. Humphrey	1933–1941		
26		Rudy Bergland	1941–1947		
27		Alex J. Nemzek	1948–1949		
28		F. Ralph Hollands	1950–1951		
29		Henry C. Steining	1952–1953	Sometimes spelled Stiening	
30		Thornley F. Wells	1954–1957	Died in office	
31		I. T. Stenerson	1957	Appointed by city council to fill term	
31		I. T. Stenerson	1958–1961		
32		Dr. Bottolf T. Bottolfson	1962–1963		
33		Richard M. Stordahl	1964–1971		
34		Dwaine Hoberg	1972–1977		
35		Wayne Ingersoll	1978–1979		
36		Morris L. Lanning	1980–2001		
37		Mark Voxland	2002–2013		
38		Del Rae Williams	2014–2018		
39		Jonathan Judd	2019–2021	Resigned, appointed 7th Judicial District Court judge	
40		Shelly Carlson	2021–2022	Appointed by city council to fill term	
40		Shelly Carlson	2023–present		

== See also ==
- List of mayors of Fargo, North Dakota
