= Fairmont Creamery Company Building =

Fairmont Creamery Company Building may refer to:

- Fairmont Creamery (Moorhead, MN)
- Fairmont Creamery Company Building (Fairmont, Nebraska), listed on the National Register of Historic Places in Fillmore County, Nebraska
- Fairmont Creamery Company Building (Rapid City, South Dakota), listed on the National Register of Historic Places in Pennington County, South Dakota
