= Felix Battles =

American Civil War soldier

Felix Battles (early 1840s – April 20, 1907) was an American former slave and Civil War veteran who served in the United States Colored Troops, and one of the first settlers of Moorhead, Minnesota, where he was a businessman running his own barbershop. He was called by one newspaper the "pioneer barber of the Red River Valley".

== Biography ==
Little is known about Battles' early life. He was born into slavery on a cotton plantation in the early 1840s in Shelby County, Tennessee, near Nashville, and grew up in Mississippi. He was owned by Eliza Dawson, wife of William C. Dawson. Battles gained his freedom as a teenager, though it is not known how or exactly when.

As a young man, he lived in Saint Paul, Minnesota, and worked on steamboats on the Mississippi River. In 1864, the 18th United States Colored Infantry Regiment of the United States Colored Troops formed in Missouri to serve in the Union Army. In August that year, Battles enlisted in Saint Paul. He did so as one of about 200,000 black men serving in the military during the Civil War – and at great risk to himself. Black soldiers captured by the Confederacy faced enslavement or execution. The programming director of the Historical and Cultural Society of Clay County commented, "He was free, but he risked it all again to join the Union Army... He returned to the South knowing that the Confederacy often did not allow African American soldiers to surrender. They were often killed when trying to surrender, or their bodies were sometimes mutilated and put on display." Battles served in Company G and reached the rank of corporal. The regiment fought in the Battle of Nashville.

After Battles' military service, he worked for a time on the Northern Pacific Railway. Battles later began work as a barber, one of the few business options available to him at the time as an African American. Initially, he was a traveling barber. In the 1870s he and his family moved to Moorhead, Minnesota, where they settled, becoming some of the city's first permanent residents. He started his own barbershop in town called the Jay Cooke Barbershop, named after Union war effort and railroad financier Jay Cooke.

In 1905, Battles had a stroke, which left him partially paralyzed and forced him to close his business. He then applied for a pension, receiving $12 per month. Battles died two years later, on April 20, 1907, in Moorhead. His obituary described him as "a quiet, unobtrusive man, [who] was respected by all who knew him." Battles' funeral was held on April 23, 1907, with a number of war veterans in attendance. He was buried in Riverside Cemetery, Moorhead.

=== Family ===
Battles and his wife, Kate, had two children – Julia, who died in childhood, and Richard (1871–1916). The Appeal described Kate as "always looking around to find some poor sick person to whom she can give a helping hand." She died in 1902 at 50 years of age.

== Legacy ==
In 2018, the Historical and Cultural Society of Clay County spearheaded a project to create a monument in honor of Felix Battles in Moorhead. Artist and local historian Markus Krueger designed the monument – a life-sized steel stencil of an African American Union Civil War soldier. The monument and its accompanying interpretive panels are intended to teach people that Clay County's local African American community dates back to the very founding of its towns and to honor the crucial role that African Americans played in winning the Civil War.

In 2021, an advisory committee of Fargo-Moorhead area African American leaders was formed to guide the project and choose a site for the statue. The site chosen was Felix Battles' old front yard, which happens to be the Center for Business at Minnesota State University Moorhead – very fitting for this pioneer African American businessman. Supported by donations from local residents, local businesses, and the Minnesota Historical Society, the statue was installed in November 2023.
