= Rourke Art Museum =

The Rourke Art Gallery + Museum
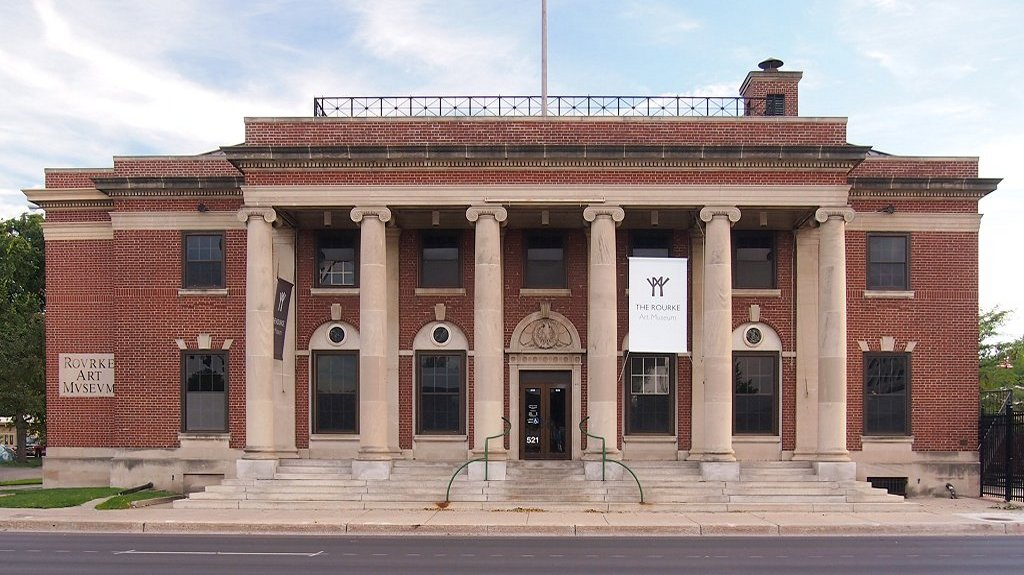
- The Rourke Art Gallery + Museum from Main Avenue
- Established: June 1960
- Location: 521 Main Avenue; Moorhead, Minnesota
- Type: Art museum
- Website: www.therourke.org

- Federal Courthouse and Post Office
- U.S. National Register of Historic Places
- Location within Minnesota Location within the United States
- Location: 521 Main Ave., Moorhead, Minnesota
- Coordinates: 46°52′24″N 96°46′15″W
- Area: less than one acre
- Built: 1915
- Architect: Wenderoth, Oscar
- Architectural style: Classical Revival
- MPS: Clay County MRA
- NRHP reference No.: 80002015
- Added to NRHP: May 7, 1980

The Rourke Art Gallery + Museum is a fine arts museum in Moorhead, Minnesota, United States, founded by James O'Rourke.

The art museum can be found at 521 Main Avenue in a historic Federal Courthouse and Post Office, erected in 1915. The building was included in a study of historic properties in Clay County, which said the building "shows the influence of Federal government function in most towns." It was listed on the National Register of Historic Places in 1980.

== Permanent collections ==
The museum's permanent collections contain more than four-thousand works from an array of cultural and artistic traditions including West African, Islamic, Chinese, Japanese, Pre-Columbian, Contemporary and Colonial Mexican, American Indian, contemporary American, Regionalist, and Pop Art. Artists whose work is represented include Andy Warhol, James Rosenquist, Jim Dine, Roy Lichtenstein, Allan D'Arcangelo, Robert Rauschenberg, David Gilhooly, Leonard Baskin, Fritz Scholder, Luis Jiménez, Joan Miró, Salvador Dalí, Marc Chagall, Sir William Nicholson, and Adolf Dehn.
