= Clarence I. Evenson =

American politician

Member of the Minnesota House of Representatives
- In office January 6, 1959 – January 7, 1963

Mayor of Moorhead, Minnesota
- In office March 1, 1921 – March 1, 1923
- In office March 1, 1931 – March 1, 1933

Personal details
- Born: January 17, 1890 Moorhead, Minnesota
- Died: January 7, 1981 (aged 90)

Clarence I. Evenson (January 17, 1890 – January 7, 1981) was an American politician and grocery store owner.

== Life ==
Evenson was born in Moorhead, Minnesota, where he later became mayor twice, from 1921 until 1923 and from 1931 until 1933. Evenson served as a member of the Minnesota House of Representatives from 1959 until 1963.
