= Northern Lights Library Network =

Northern Lights Library Network (NLLN) is the largest (geographically) of seven multi-county, multitype library cooperative systems in the state of Minnesota. NLLN serves all types of libraries found in the 23 counties of Northwest and West Central Minnesota. The organization has over 300 member libraries including public libraries, school libraries, academic libraries (private and public), and special libraries. Northern Lights Library Network is established in Minnesota statute and receives funding from the Minnesota legislature via the Office of State Library Services within the Minnesota Department of Education. NLLN offices are located in Moorhead, Minnesota.

== Governance ==
The organization is governed by an eleven-member governing board. Seven citizen board members are appointed by the 4 regional public library systems in the NLLN region; 4 members are library workers representing academic, public, school, and special libraries and are selected by their peers. The board meets six times each year.

== Continuing Education ==
Northern Lights Library Network provides a variety of continuing education opportunities for library staff, advocates, and trustees. One example is the organization's sponsorship of the annual "Spotlight on Books," conference now in its 21st year. The conference provides an opportunity for librarians and educators to learn about children's literature and to meet local and national authors.
