= William B. Dosland =

American lawyer (1927–1993)

William B. "Bill" Dosland (November 10, 1927 – April 5, 1993) was an American politician and lawyer.

Dosland was born in Chicago, Illinois and went to the Chicago Public Schools. He served in the United States Navy during World War II and the Korean War. Dosland moved to Moorhead, Minnesota after World War II. He lived in Moorhead, Minnesota with his wife and family; his son-in-law was Randy P. Kamrath who also served in the Minnesota Legislature. Dosland graduated from Concordia College, Moorhead, Minnesota, in 1949 and then graduated from the University of Minnesota Law School in 1954. He was admitted to the Minnesota bar. Dosland served in the Minnesota Senate from 1959 to 1972 and was a Republican. In 1992, Dosland moved to Fargo, North Dakota. Dosland died at Valley Lutheran Hospital in Mesa, Arizona while on vacation.
