= Bluestem Amphitheater =

Coordinates: 46°49′05″N 96°47′45″W

Bluestem Center for the Arts
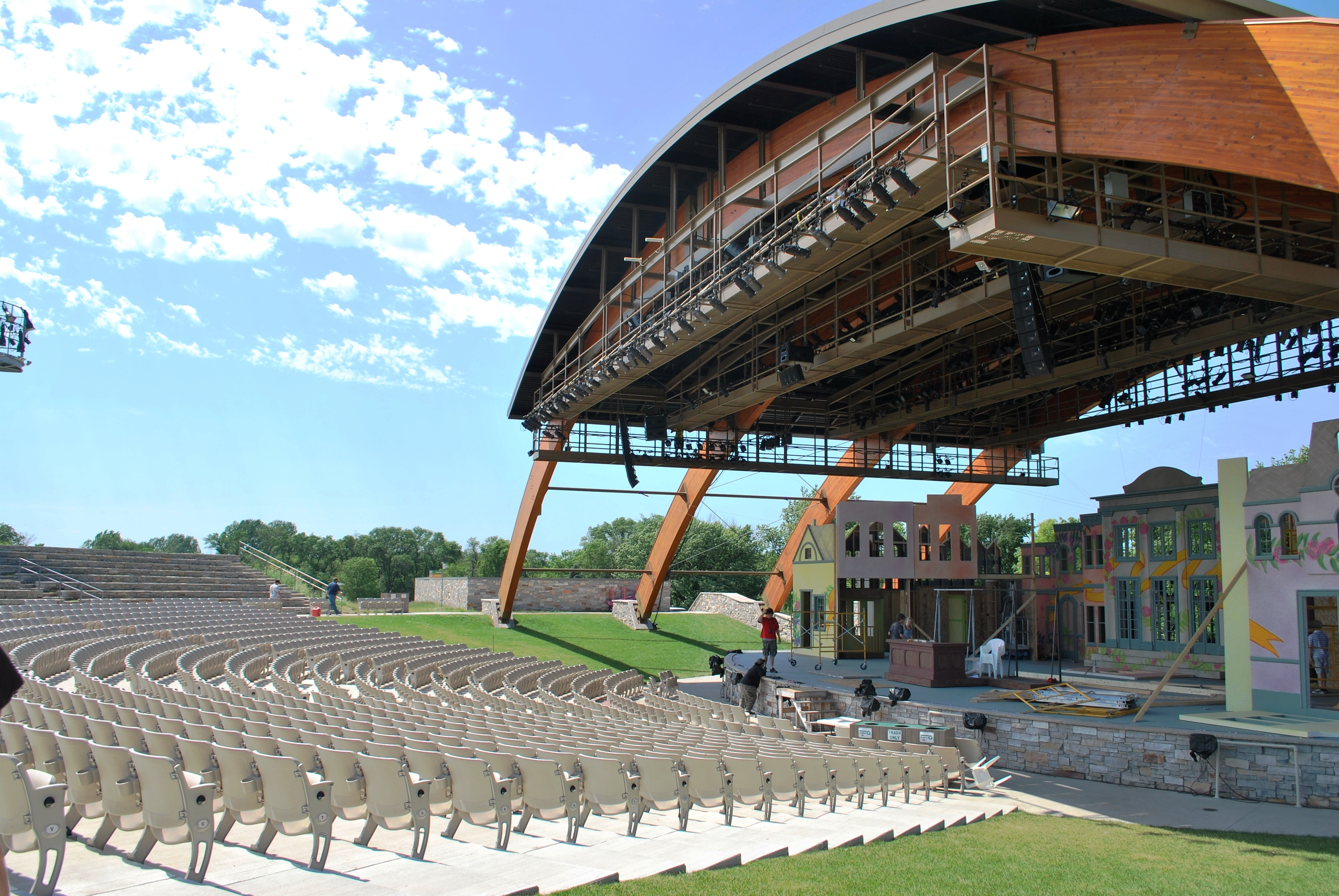
- Interactive map of Bluestem Center for the Arts
- Location: 801 50th Ave SW; Moorhead, Minnesota 56560
- Owner: Fargo School District (Stage and Buildings) City of Moorhead (Land)
- Capacity: 3,000

Construction
- Groundbreaking: 2007
- Opened: 2009
- Cost: $15 Million

Tenant
- Trollwood Performing Arts Center

Website
- bluestemamphitheater.org

Bluestem Center for the Arts is a 3,000 seat outdoor theater in Moorhead, Minnesota that exhibits performing arts and concerts. Since its opening, it has earned a national reputation as a premier contemporary amphitheater.

== History ==
In 2009, the $15 million Bluestem Center for the Arts opened after a collaboration from the City of Moorhead, Fargo School District, and the State of Minnesota. The Fargo School District owns the buildings on the site, while the City of Moorhead owns the land.

The need for Bluestem Center for the Arts arose due to continuous flooding at the previous home for Trollwood Performing Arts School at Trollwood Park in North Fargo. Initially, the local communities welcomed the center. A few short years later, the center experienced financial hardships. The original non-profit was no longer able to make payments and the Fargo School District took over the amphitheater and the approximately $5 million worth of debt. Though the center has not yet produced a profit, they seem to be on-track as of 2015, as seasonal attendance and billings have increased.

In 2014, the amphitheater set a new attendance record of 3,200 spectators for a concert featuring the Goo Goo Dolls

2023 events include visiting performances by Chicago as well as Willie Nelson and Family.

== Programs ==
The amphitheater is used and managed by the Trollwood Performing Arts School as their main home. Trollwood offers performing arts classes to kids of all ages.

Local concert promoters also draw national acts including: Wilco, Weezer, Goo Goo Dolls, and The Fray.
