= Interstate Raceway =

Drift track and drag strip in Glyndon, Minnesota, USA

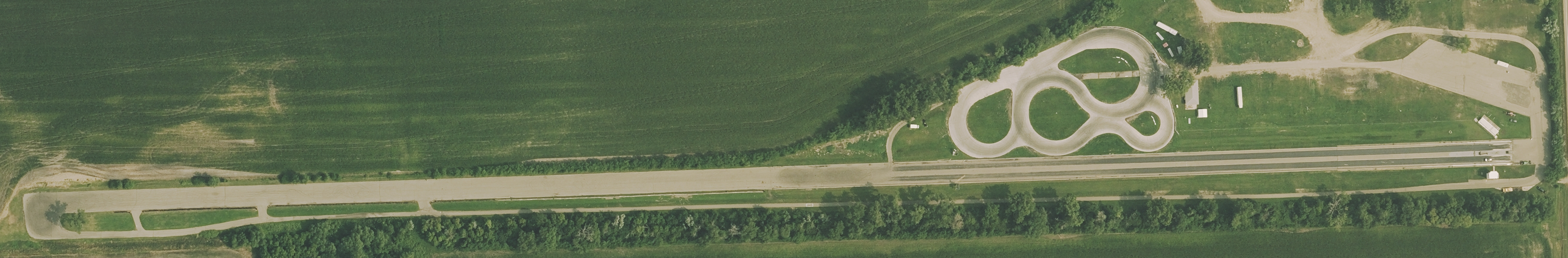
- 2023 aerial photo
- Location: Clay County, SE of Moorhead, Minnesota, United States
- Coordinates: 46°49′52″N 96°39′7″W
- Opened: 1959
- Former names: Top End Dragways (2011–2019); Interstate Dragway (1969-2010); Red River Valley Dragway (1959-1968)
- Website: https://interstateraceway.com/

Interstate Raceway is a dragstrip and drifting race facility southeast of the city of Moorhead, Minnesota. It features a 0.25 mi (0.40 km) dragstrip and concrete drift track.

== History ==
The track was built by George Holland and opened in 1959 under AHRA sanctioning. In 1969 the track was sold to DuWayne Engness and renamed Interstate Dragway, which changed to NHRA sanctioning. Races included NHRA classes and the schedule was later expanded with bracket racing to fill weekend events. In 1996 the track was sold to Ron Johnson, who kept the name and NHRA sanctioning. In late 2010 the track was sold to Charlie McCann and renamed Top End Dragways. In 2012 the track hosted its first NHRA National Open.

In 2018, Matt Sandbeck and Ryan Keller of Sandbeck Race Development purchased the track to expand their shop facility. Later that year a concrete drift track was completed north of the drag strip. In 2020, the name of the track was changed to Interstate Raceway as an homage to the historical name while recognizing that it hosts multiple motorsports.
