= Historical and Cultural Society of Clay County =

County museum in Moorhead, Minnesota

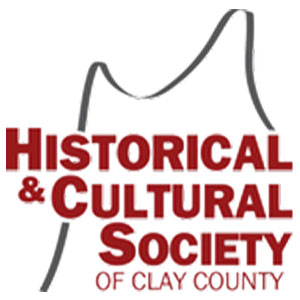

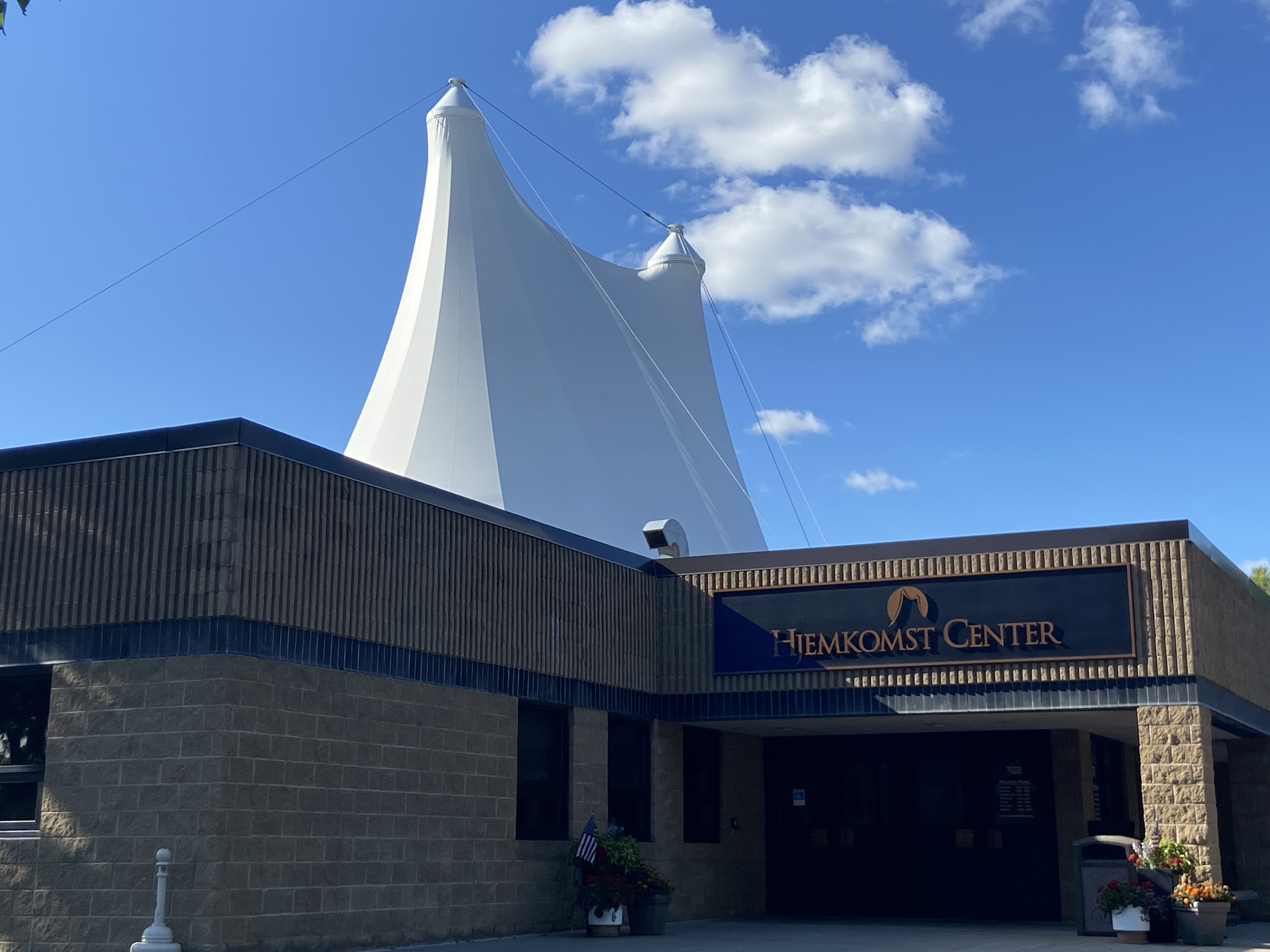
- Entrance to the Hjemkomst Center
- Established: 1932
- Location: 202 1st Ave N, Moorhead, Minnesota, 56560 United States
- Coordinates: 46.877778°N 96.778611°W
- Type: Local history
- Executive director: Laura Forde
- Website: hcscconline.org

The Historical and Cultural Society of Clay County is a local history museum located in Moorhead, Minnesota and exists to collect, preserve, interpret, and share the history and culture of Clay County, Minnesota. The organization directs the museum and archives at the Hjemkomst Center and provides tours of Moorhead's Hjemkomst Viking Ship and Moorhead Stave Church.

== History ==
The organization formed in 1932 as the Clay County Historical Society. They adopted the current name in 2009 when the organization merged with the Heritage Hjemkomst Interpretive Center.

== Hjemkomst Center ==
The Heritage Hjemkomst Interpretive Center, commonly known as the Hjemkomst Center, opened its doors in 1985. The building features a distinctive ship sail roof design. Its primary purpose centered on showcasing the Hjemkomst Viking Ship and its historic voyage. Over time, the center expanded its focus to encompass broader aspects of Clay County's history and culture.

A significant milestone occurred in 2009 when the Heritage Hjemkomst Interpretive Center merged with the Clay County Historical Society, forming the Historical and Cultural Society of Clay County. This merger expanded the center's role in preserving and interpreting the region's history. The Center houses the Historical and Cultural Society of Clay County administration and collections.

== Hjemkomst Viking Ship ==
The Hjemkomst Viking Ship stands as a replica of the Gokstad burial ship. Local resident Robert Asp conceived the idea to build and sail a Viking ship to Norway. The ship's journey serves as the subject of an award-winning documentary.

Construction of the Hjemkomst began in 1974 and spanned several years. The ship's maiden voyage took place in 1980, though Asp died before realizing his dream of sailing to Norway. His family and friends continued his vision, and in 1982, the Hjemkomst successfully completed its transatlantic journey.

=== Hjemkomst Viking Ship Gallery ===
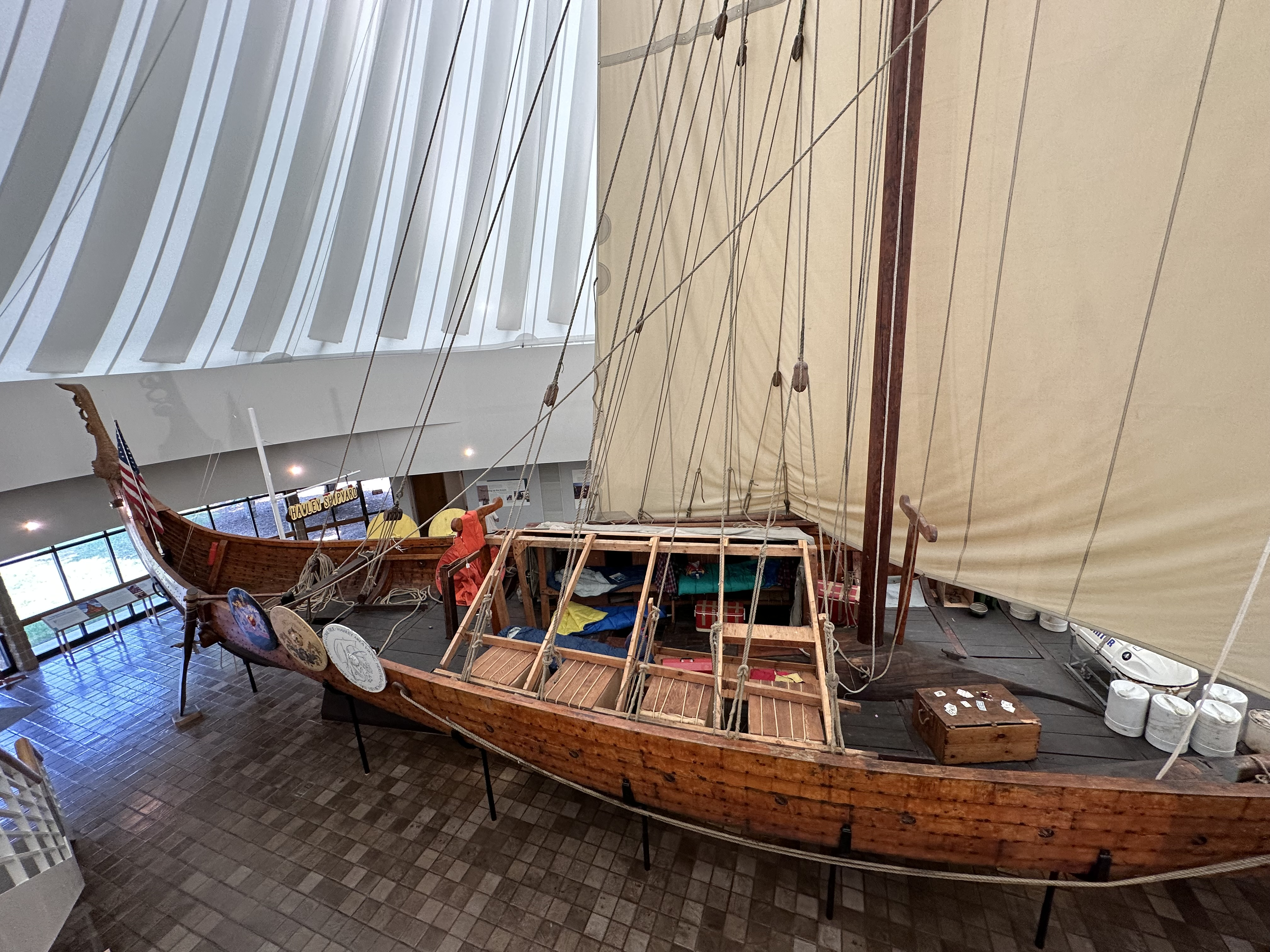
Hjemkomst is a replica Viking ship

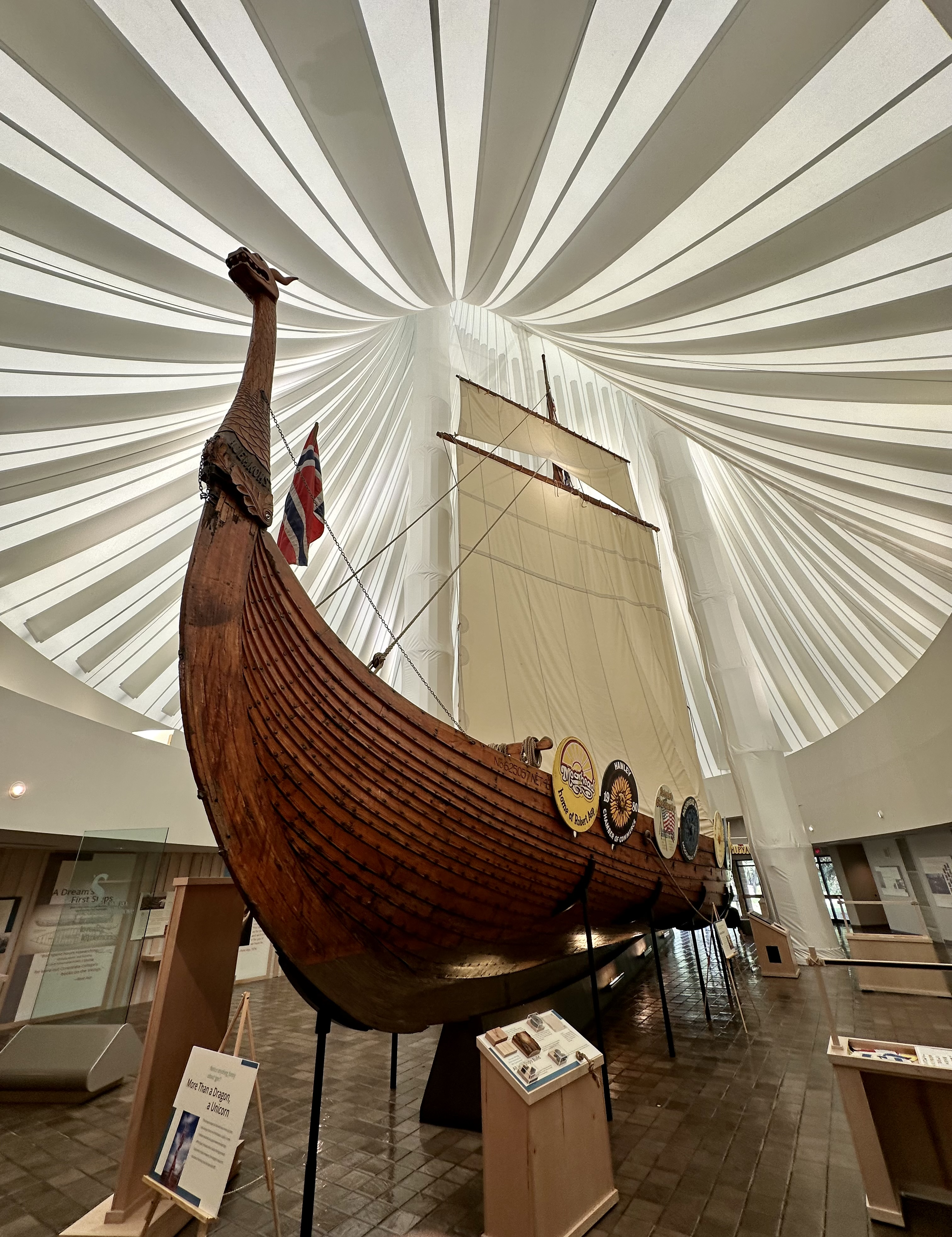
Hjemkomst, which means "Homecoming" in Norwegian

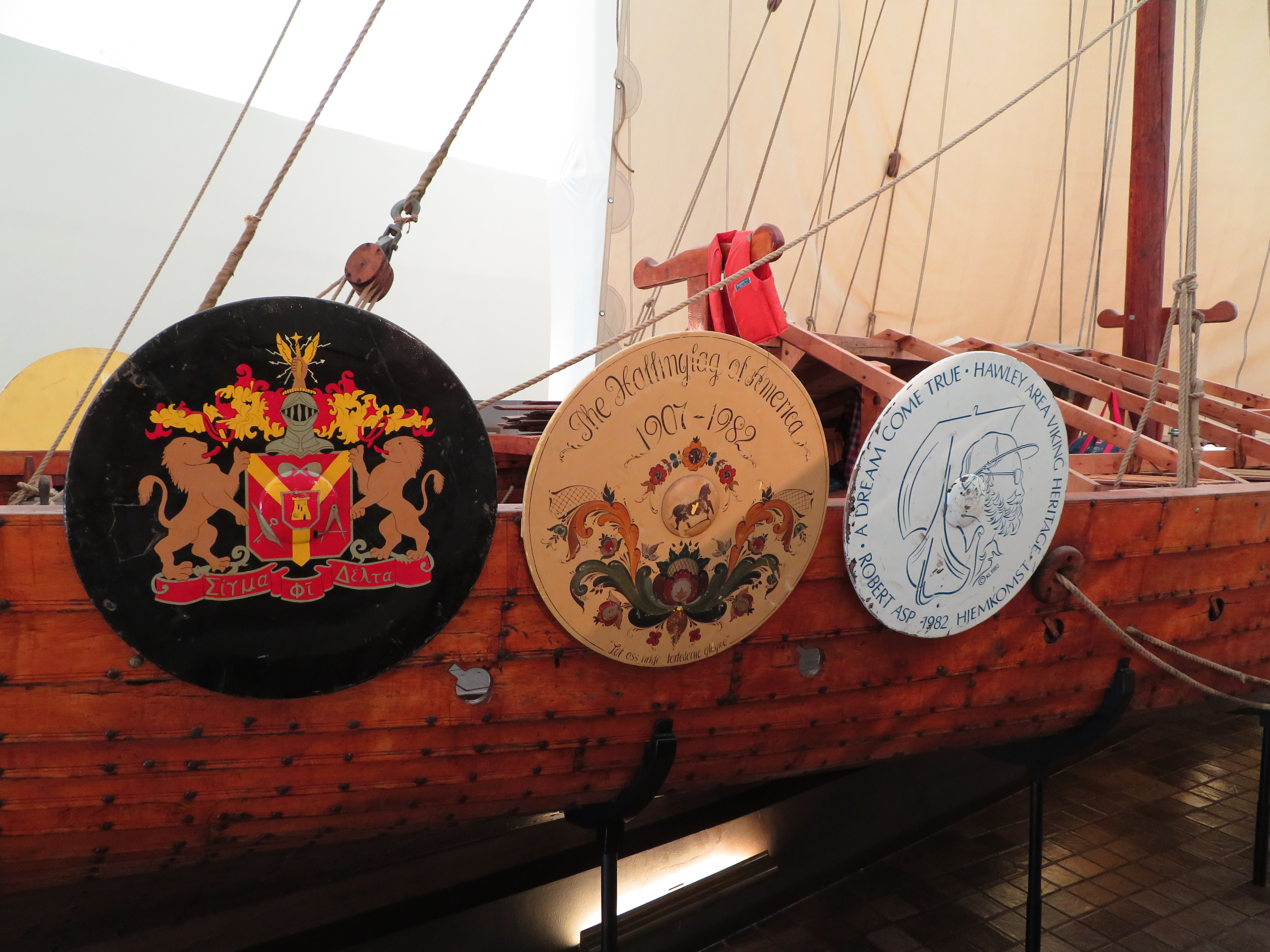
Shields on side of ship

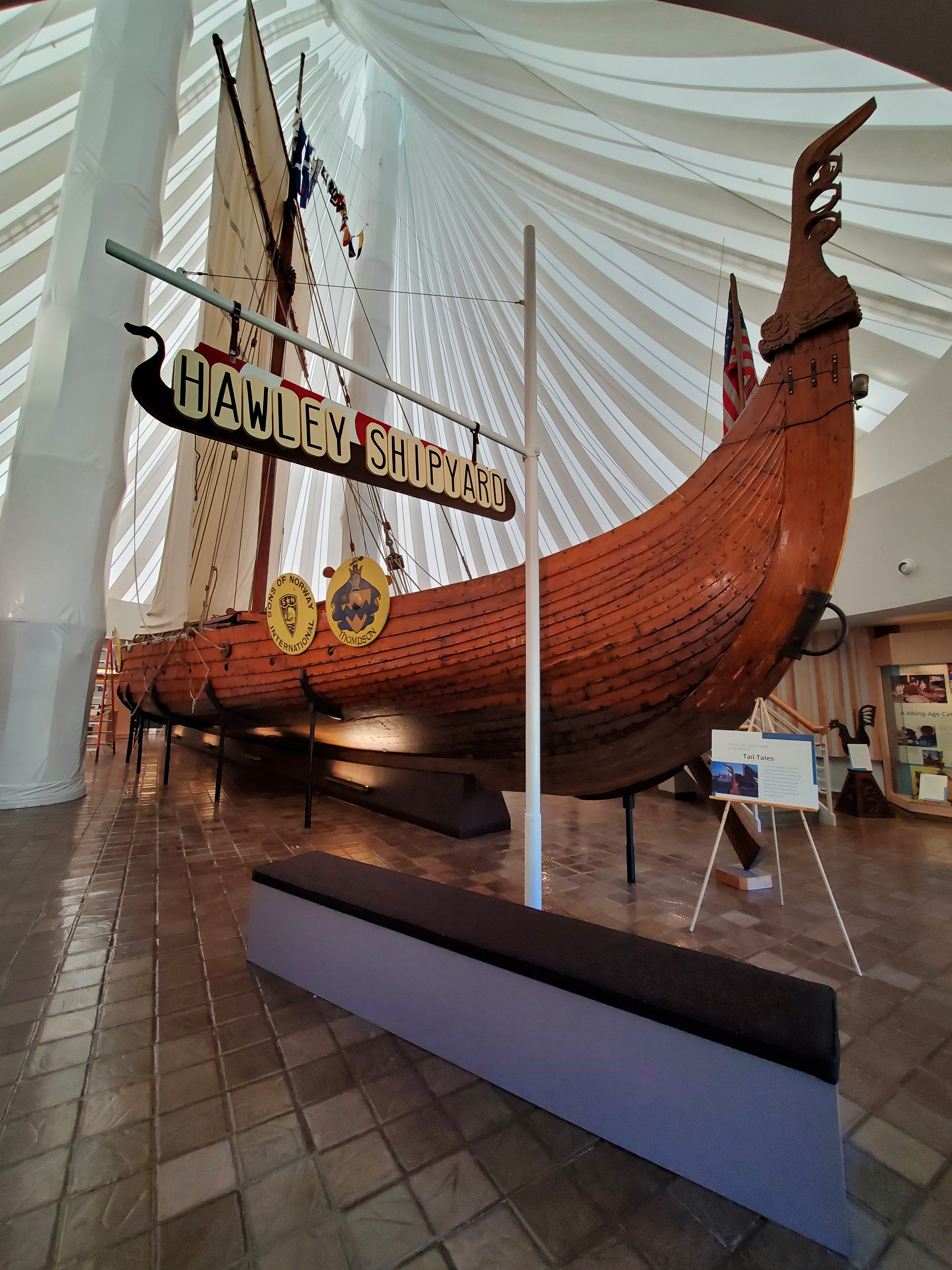
Full view of ship

== Hopperstad Stave Church Replica ==
The Hopperstad Stave Church Replica stands as a full-scale replica of the original Hopperstad Stave Church located in Vik, Norway. Built between 1996 and 2001, it serves as a testament to Norwegian heritage and culture in the Midwest.

Guy Paulson, a retired researcher from North Dakota State University, spearheaded the construction project. The church features intricate carvings and architectural details, replicating the original Norwegian structure. It stands at 72 feet tall with 18 staves, each measuring 27 feet in height.

The Moorhead Stave Church functions as a community resource, hosting weddings, cultural events, and educational programs.

=== Hopperstad Stave Church Replica Gallery ===
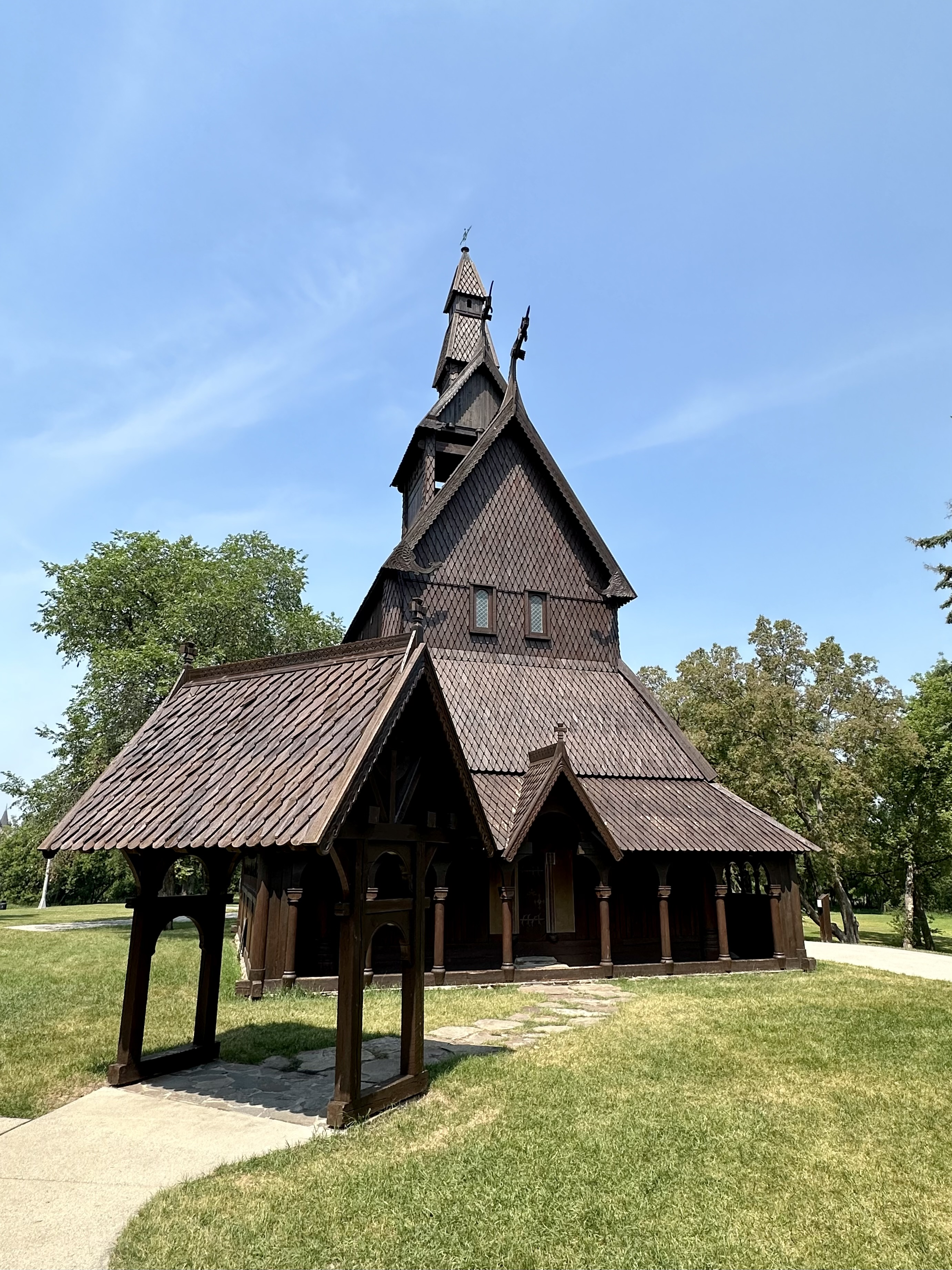
The Hopperstad Stave Church Replica is a replica of a Norwegian stave church

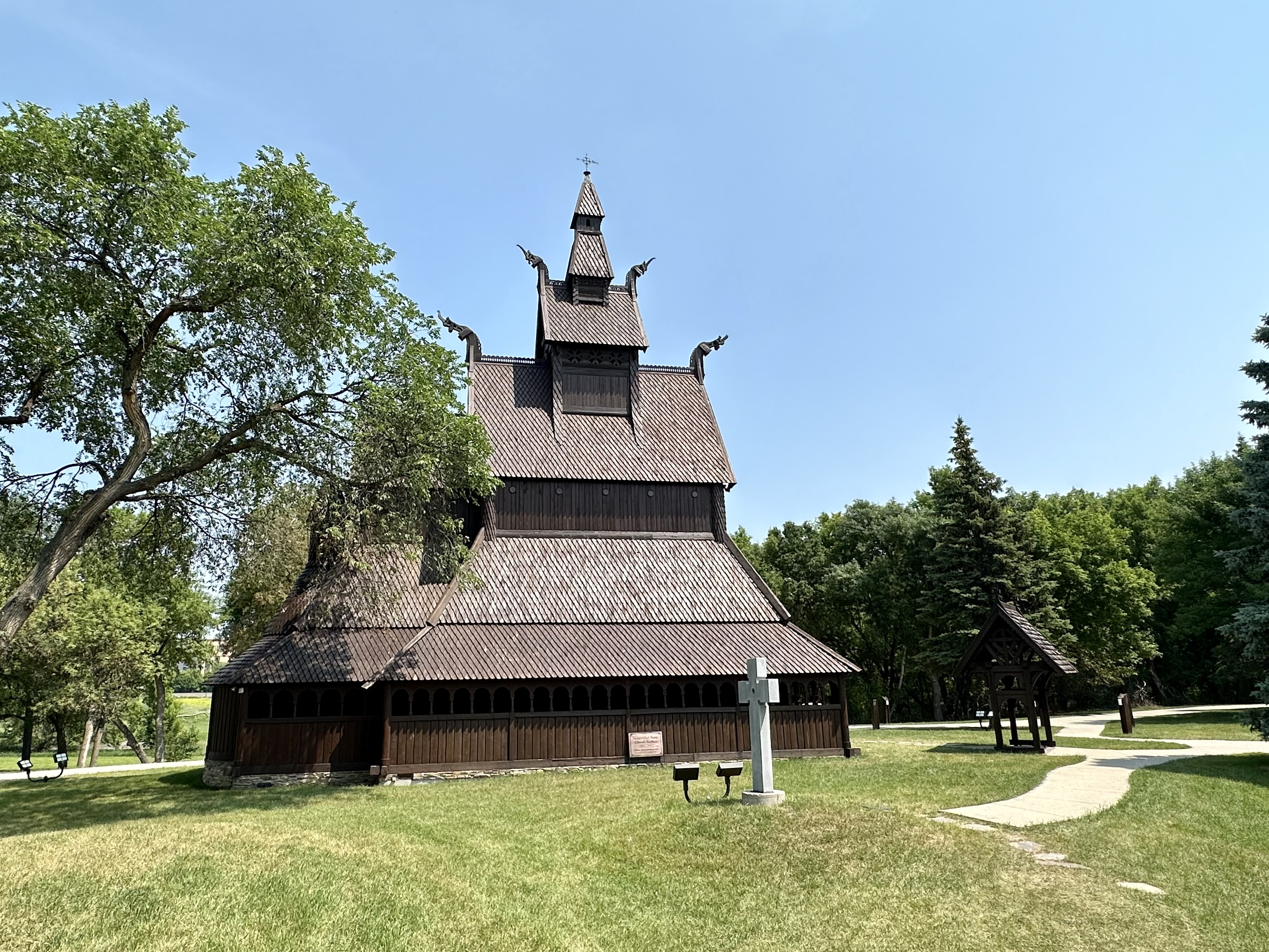
The Hopperstad Stave Church Replica is located at the Hjemkomst Center in Moorhead, Minnesota.

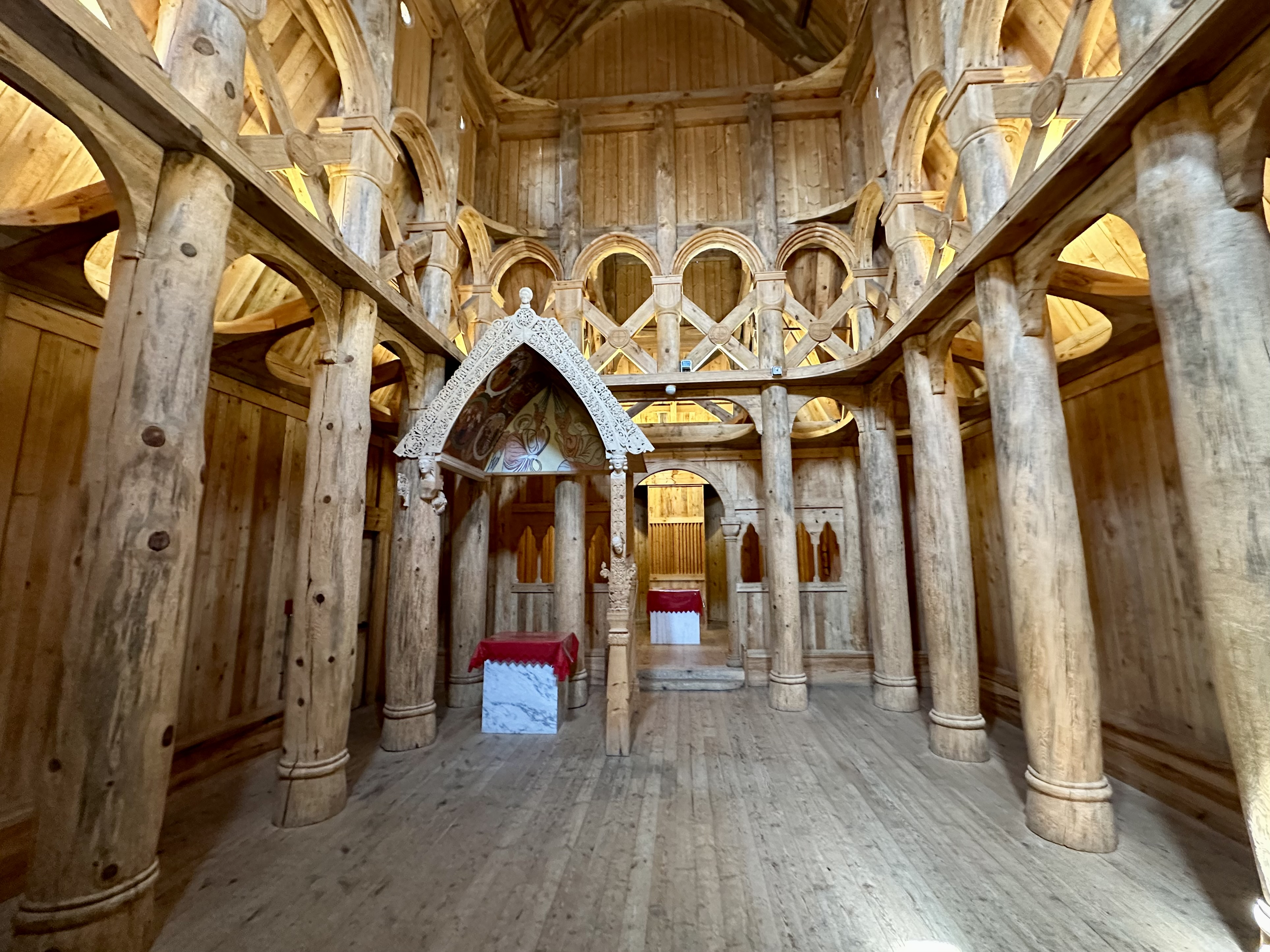
The interior of the Hopperstad Stave Church Replica

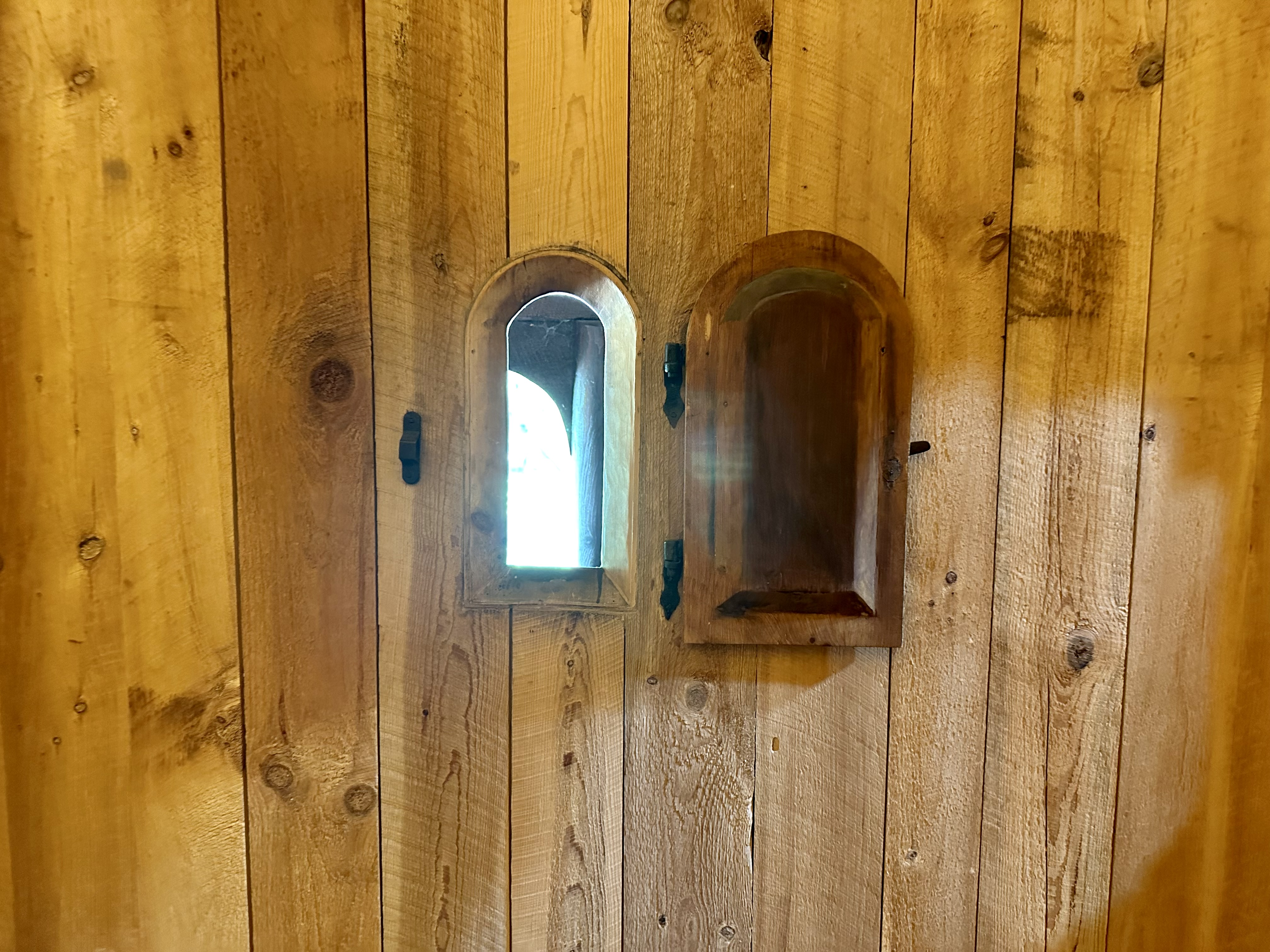
The leper window near the altar in the Hopperstad Stave Church Replica allowed the individuals with Leprosy to see the service and receive communion while remaining outside of the church.

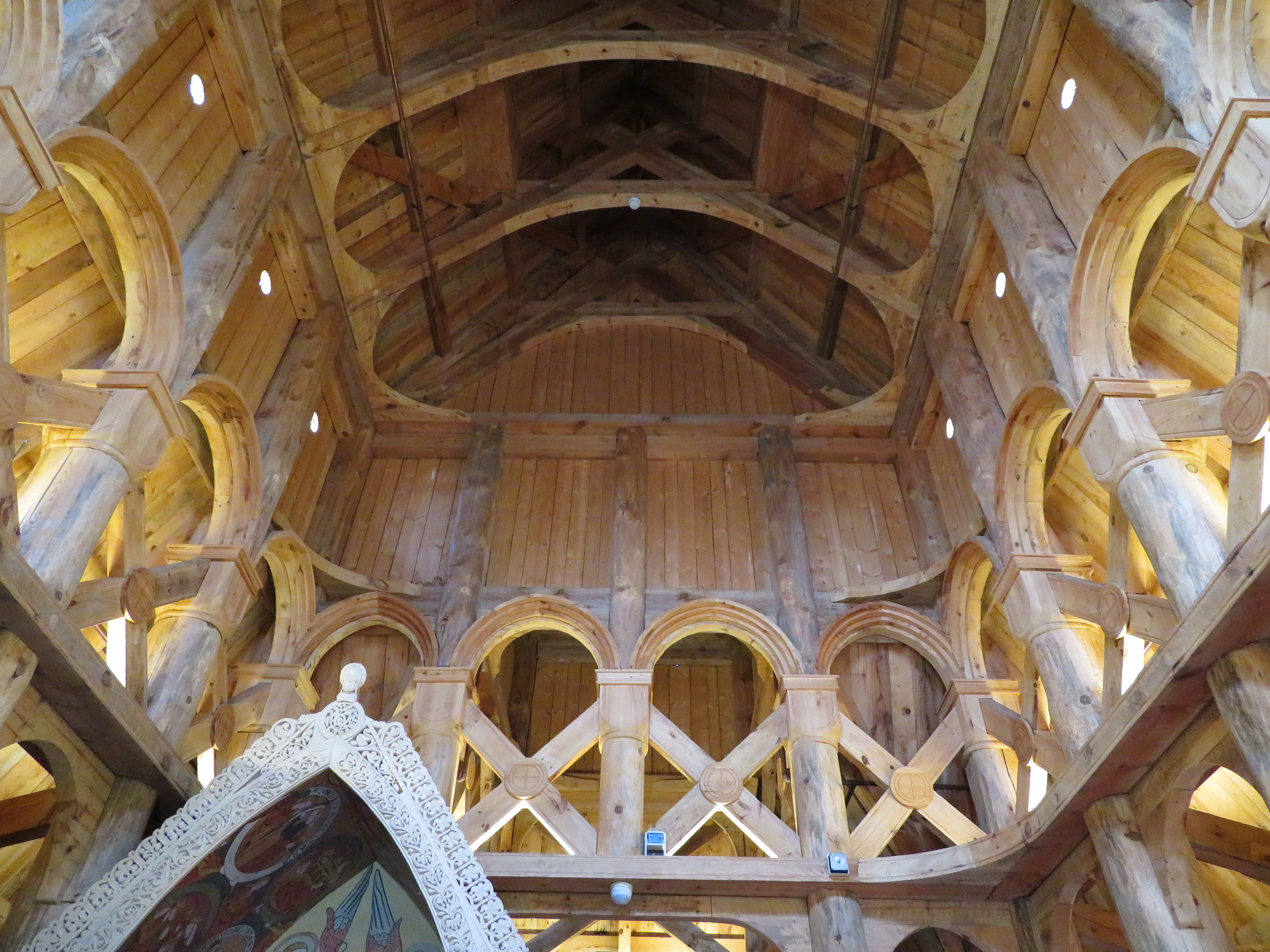

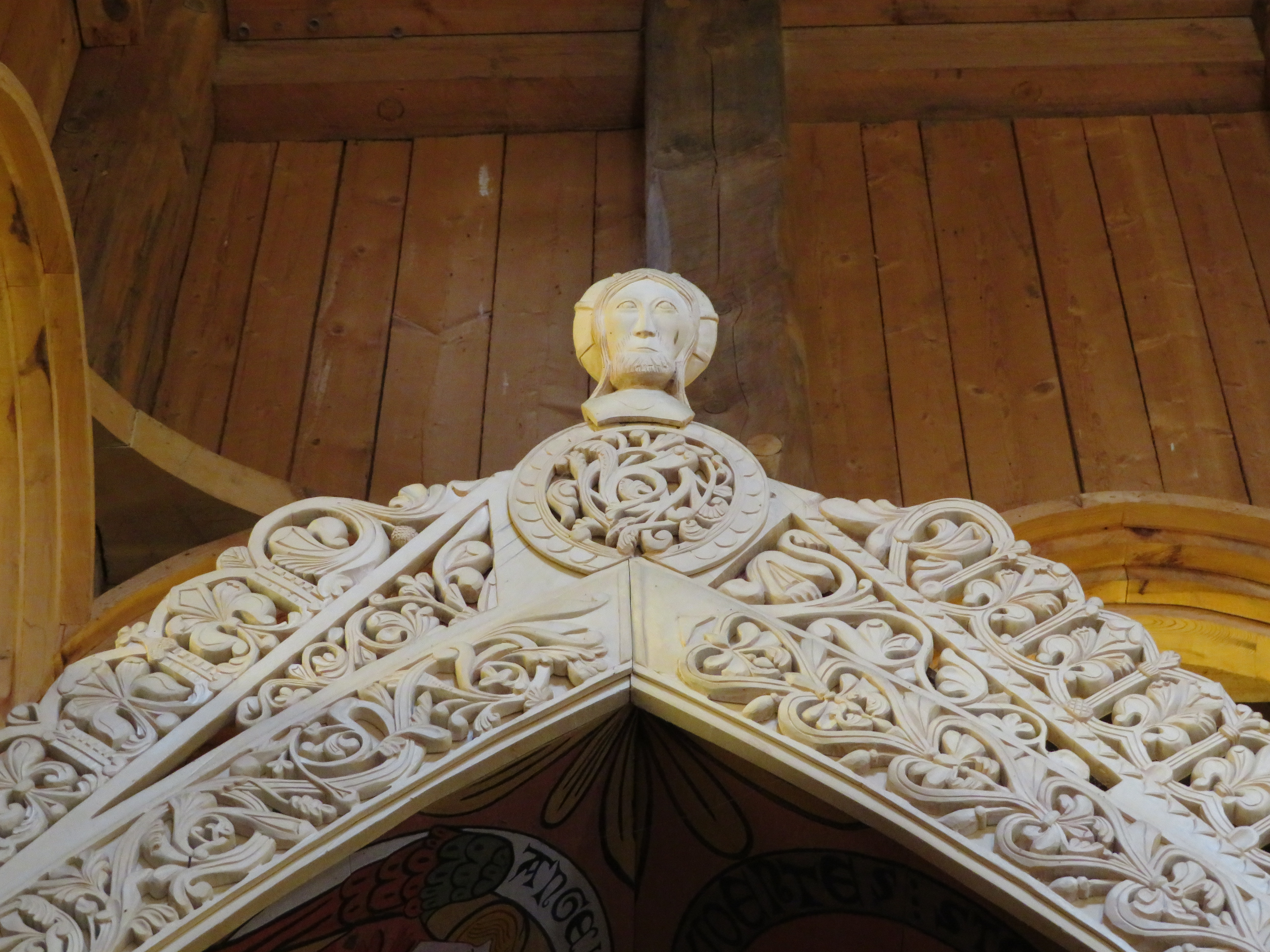

== Bergquist Cabin and Comstock House ==
The Historical and Cultural Society of Clay County preserves the Bergquist Cabin and manages the Comstock House. The society utilizes these sites for educational and interpretive purposes.

=== Bergquist Cabin ===
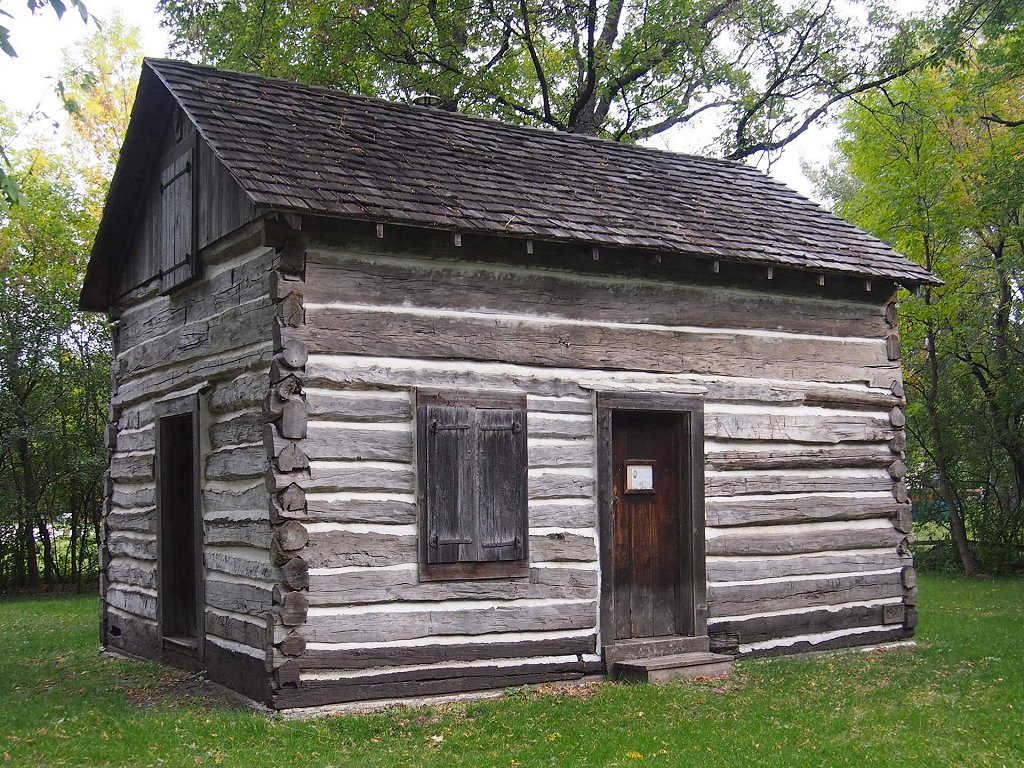
John Bergquist Cabin

John Gustav Bergquist, among the earliest settlers in Moorhead, constructed the cabin in the late 1800s. The house remains on its original frontier location and stands as the oldest house in Moorhead. Dewey Bergquist, John Bergquist's grandson, repurchased his grandfather's home in 1978. A longtime local television weatherman, Bergquist restored the cabin to its 1870s condition. In 1989, Bergquist donated the cabin to the Clay County Historical Society for preservation. The home holds a place on the National Register of Historic Places.

=== Comstock House ===
Solomon Comstock constructed the Comstock House between 1882 and 1883 in a blend of Queen Anne and Eastlake styles. A prominent figure in Moorhead's early development, Comstock held influential roles in business, politics, and civic affairs. The Minnesota Historical Society owns the structure, while the Historical and Cultural Society of Clay County manages the day to day operations. The house was listed on the National Register of Historic Places in 1974.

== Exhibits and Programming ==
The Historical and Cultural Society of Clay County presents a range of exhibits focusing on local, regional, and national history. The organization offers educational programs, tours, and events throughout the year.

== See also ==
- List of museums in Minnesota
