= Randy P. Kamrath =

American politician

Randy P. Kamrath (born May 23, 1954) is an American politician and a farmer.

Kamrath was born in Canby, Yellow Medicine County, Minnesota. Kamrath went to the University of Minnesota. He lived in Canby, Minnesota with his wife Susan (née Dosland) and their family and was a farmer. Kamrath served in the Minnesota Senate from 1981 to 1986 and was a Republican. His wife's father William B. Dosland also served in the Minnesota Legislature.
