= Fairmont Creamery (Moorhead, Minnesota) =

- U.S. National Register of Historic Places
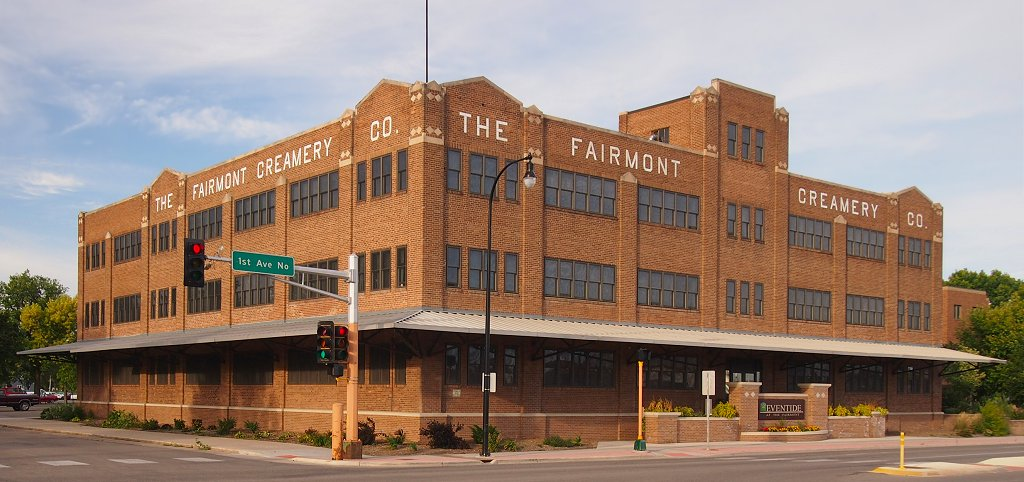

- Location within Minnesota Location within the United States
- Interactive map showing the location of Fairmont Creamery
- Location: 801 2nd Ave N Moorhead, Minnesota 56560
- Coordinates: 46.87634955715893°N 96.76745982754792°W
- Built: 1923; 103 years ago
- NRHP reference No.: 83000901
- Added to NRHP: February 10, 1983

The Fairmont Creamery building located in Moorhead, Minnesota was constructed in 1923 for its proximity to the railroad and opened soon after in 1924. The local Fairmont was important to the community through its use of cream checks, checks distributed to farmers who sold their cream, and also its food production for the government during World War II. In 1947, the Fairmont Creamery Company rebranded to "Fairmont Foods" as they broadened their range from mostly milk-based products. Later, in 1980, the Moorhead Fairmont Foods was sold to Cass-Clay Creamery, a subsidiary of American Financial Corporation of Cincinnati, Ohio, and the next year, it was closed. Shortly after, Anderson-Jordhal turned it into a senior living facility.

== Fairmont Creamery/Fairmont Foods ==
In 1924, the Fairmont Creamery was opened in Moorhead next to the city's railroad. The Fairmont Creamery Company, founded in 1884 with its headquarters in Omaha, Nebraska and locations across the United States, found the Moorhead location unique for its experimental farm, which raised Guernsey cows which were experimented upon with extremely well-maintained records. The farm also raised turkeys that were experimentally fed flaked buttermilk; many local flocks of turkeys in Moorhead can still trace their ancestry to the Fairmont turkeys.

Beyond the experimental farm, the Fairmont Creamery had local significance as well. Fairmont heavily advertized, including its ability to pay farmers "cream checks." In newspapers such as The Concordian, the Concordia College newspaper, they advertised with slogans such as "Let Fairmont's better butter, butter your bread," "Ring for Fairmont," and "Let your cows and Fairmont's checks pay all your bills." This last slogan is a reference to the cream checks that farmers received for selling their cream to Fairmont. Between 1924, the year it opened, and 1929, 12,325,000 cream checks (roughly 205,416 a month) were given to farmers. These were extremely valuable form of income, particularly during the 1930s.

During World War II, the Moorhead Fairmont was contracted by the government to make food products including eggs, poultry, and dried eggs. In 1943, the location was rewarded an Army-Navy "E" Award for its outstanding contribution. This was a moment of great pride for the community as the government recognized the work of Moorhead, as such, there was a celebration for the Fairmont Creamery. Shortly after, the Fairmont Creamery Company changed their name to "Fairmont Foods" to reflect the newly broadened inventory.

In 1980, Fairmont Foods Co. decided to merge with a subsidiary of another business, the American Financial Corporation of Cincinnati, Ohio. In turn, all Fairmont Foods locations either were sold or closed completely.

== Senior Living Facility ==
Cass-Clay sold the building to Anderson-Jordhal Development in 1981, almost immediately after purchasing it. On December 29, 1982, Anderson-Jordhal added Fairmont to the National Register of Historic Places for tax purposes. Soon after, the company started remodeling the building to turn it into a senior living facility.

In 1987, the building was purchased by Bethany Retirement Living. They kept the building until 1994, when they sold it to Eventide: Senior Living Communities. Eventide remodeled areas of the Fairmont over the next year, including the front and rear entrances, lobby, lounge, and created a storage shed. Eventide kept the "Fairmont Creamery" writing located on the exterior and even referred to the specific location as the "Eventide Fairmont."

On July 7, 2021, Eventide announced the closure of the retirement home, and that they planned to move all residents. While Eventide had already planned on closing the Fairmont, the process was expedited by significant water damage from a pipe leak. Eventide sold the building with hopes of preserving the historical aspects that remained.
