= Henry C. Stiening =

American politician and lawyer

Member of the Minnesota Senate
- In office January 8, 1935 – January 6, 1947

Mayor of Moorhead, Minnesota
- In office January 1, 1952 – December 31, 1953

Personal details
- Born: December 26, 1895 Germany
- Died: June 23, 1962 (aged 66)

Henry C. Stiening, also spelled Henry C. Steining, (December 26, 1895 – June 23, 1962) was an American politician and lawyer.

Henry C Stiening was born in Germany in 1895. In 1896, his family immigrated to Foster Pond, Illinois. The Stiening family moved to Pierce County, North Dakota, in 1900 and then a farm near Felton, Minnesota, in 1910. Stiening also lived in Barnesville, Minnesota, before moving to Moorhead, Minnesota, in 1925.

Steining was a member of the Minnesota Senate from 1935 until 1947. He was also the mayor of Moorhead from 1952 until 1953.

Stiening was a member of the Phi Alpha Delta fraternity as well as the Masonic Lodge. He was also a member of Trinity Lutheran Church in Moorhead, Minnesota.
