= Sliv Nemzek =

American football and basketball coach (1895–1958)

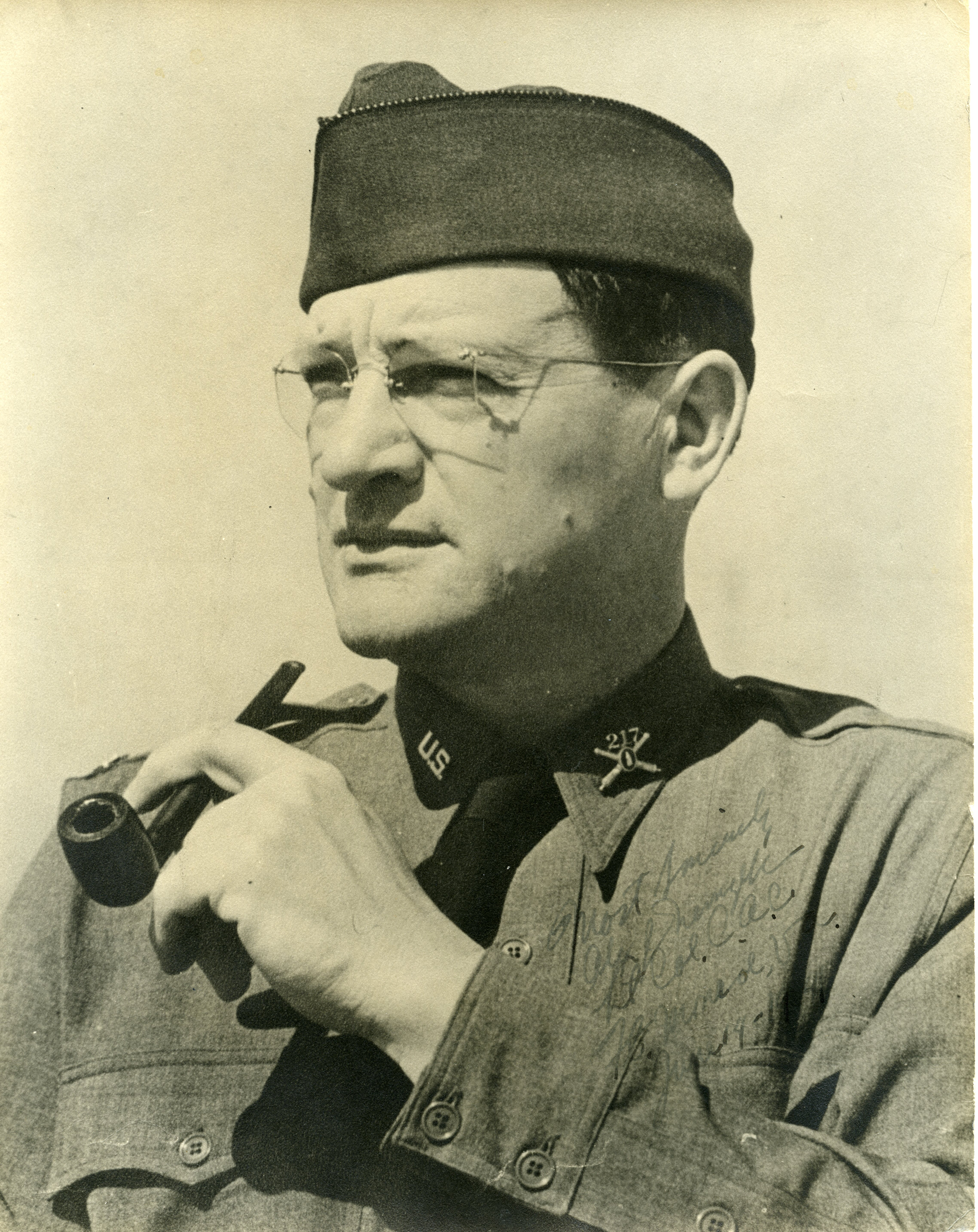

Biographical details
- Born: October 11, 1895; Moorhead, Minnesota, U.S.
- Died: May 28, 1958 (aged 62); Moorhead, Minnesota, U.S.

Playing career

Football
- 1914–1916: North Dakota State

Baseball
- 1915–1917: North Dakota State

Coaching career (HC unless noted)

Football
- 1919: Moorhead Normal
- 1920: North Dakota State (assistant)
- 1923–1940: Moorhead State

Basketball
- 1924–1941: Moorhead State

Administrative career (AD unless noted)
- 1923–1941: Moorhead State

Head coaching record
- Overall: 65–51–17 (football); 106–138 (basketball)

Accomplishments and honors

Championships
- Football; 5 IAC (1924–1925, 1928–1930); 2 NTCC (1932, 1935)

Alexander Jerome "Sliv" Nemzek Jr. (October 11, 1895 – May 28, 1958) was an American college football and college basketball coach and local politician. He served as the head football coach at Moorhead State Teachers College—renamed from Moorhead Normal School in 1921, and now known as Minnesota State University–Moorhead—in 1919 and again from 1923 to 1940, compiling a record of 65–51–17. He was also the head basketball coach at Moorhead State from 1923 to 1941, tallying a mark of 106–138.

Nemzek was born on October 11, 1895, in Moorhead, Minnesota. He attended Moorhead High School, where he played football, basketball, and baseball. Nemzek then attended North Dakota Agricultural College—now known as North Dakota State University—where he was a member of the football and baseball teams. He served in both World War I and World War II. After returning from the Second World War, he remained a prominent figure in the Fargo–Moorhead area, and served as mayor of Moorhead, Minnesota from 1948 to 1949. Nemzek died on May 28, 1958, in Moorhead, after suffering a cerebral hemorrhage two days prior.

== Head coaching record ==
=== Football ===
Year	Team	Overall	Conference	Standing	Bowl/playoffs
Moorhead Normal (Independent) (1919)
1919	Moorhead Normal	2–2			
Moorhead State Dragons (Interstate Athletic Conference) (1923–1931)
1923	Moorhead State	3–3–1			
1924	Moorhead State	5–1–1	4–0	1st	
1925	Moorhead State	1–2–4	1–0–2	T–1st	
1926	Moorhead State	4–2–1			
1927	Moorhead State	2–3–1			
1928	Moorhead State	4–1–1	4–0	1st	
1929	Moorhead State	5–2		1st	
1930	Moorhead State	5–1–1	4–0	1st	
1931	Moorhead State	4–3–2			
Moorhead State Dragons (Northern Teachers College Conference) (1932–1940)
1932	Moorhead State	2–5	2–1	T–1st	
1933	Moorhead State	2–4–2	0–2–1	5th	
1934	Moorhead State	4–2–1	2–2	T–3rd	
1935	Moorhead State	6–2	4–0	T–1st	
1936	Moorhead State	4–3	2–1	T–2nd	
1937	Moorhead State	4–3	2–1	3rd	
1938	Moorhead State	0–6–1	0–3	5th	
1939	Moorhead State	4–3–1	3–1	T–2nd	
1940	Moorhead State	4–3	3–1	2nd	
Moorhead Normal/State:		65–51–17			
Total:		65–51–17			
National championship Conference title Conference division title or championship game berth
