= Dwaine Hoberg =

American football coach and wrestling promoter (1925–1984)

Biographical details
- Born: August 17, 1925; Worthington, Minnesota, U.S.
- Died: August 6, 1984 (aged 58); Moorhead, Minnesota, U.S.

Playing career
- 1947–1949: Minnesota

Coaching career (HC unless noted)
- 1960–1969: Moorhead State

Head coaching record
- Overall: 41–45–2

Accomplishments and honors

Championships
- 1 NIC (1966)

Awards
- United Press International Coach of the Year (1966)

Dwaine Harvey Hoberg (August 17, 1925 – August 6, 1984) was an American football coach and state legislator in Minnesota. He served as the head football coach at Moorhead State University—now known as Minnesota State University Moorhead—from 1960 to 1969, compiling a record of 41–45–2.

Hoberg began his political career in 1963 with election to the Moorhead City Council. He served on the council two terms as alderman for the 4th district, and was elected mayor of the city in 1971. After three terms as mayor, Hoberg was defeated in re-election, but subsequently won a seat in the Minnesota Legislature, where he served until his retirement in 1984. Hoberg was a promoter in wrestling for the American Wrestling Association from 1960 until his death in 1984.

His grandson, Erik Swanson, plays in Major League Baseball.

== Head coaching record ==
| Year | Team | Overall | Conference | Standing | Bowl/playoffs |
|---|---|---|---|---|---|
Moorhead State Dragons (Northern State College Conference / Northern Intercollegiate Conference) (1960–1969)
| 1960 | Moorhead State | 2–7 | 1–4 | 6th | |
| 1961 | Moorhead State | 5–4 | 3–2 | T–2nd | |
| 1962 | Moorhead State | 5–4 | 2–3 | T–4th | |
| 1963 | Moorhead State | 4–4–1 | 1–3–1 | 5th | |
| 1964 | Moorhead State | 4–4 | 4–1 | 2nd | |
| 1965 | Moorhead State | 5–4 | 2–3 | 5th | |
| 1966 | Moorhead State | 6–3 | 4–1 | 1st | |
| 1967 | Moorhead State | 2–5–1 | 1–3–1 | T–4th | |
| 1968 | Moorhead State | 4–5 | 3–2 | T–3rd | |
| 1969 | Moorhead State | 4–5 | 3–2 | 3rd | |
| Moorhead State: | | 41–45–2 | 24–24–2 | | |
| Total: | | 41–45–2 | | | |
National championship Conference title Conference division title or championship game berth
