= Moorhead, Minnesota =

City in Minnesota, United States

- City
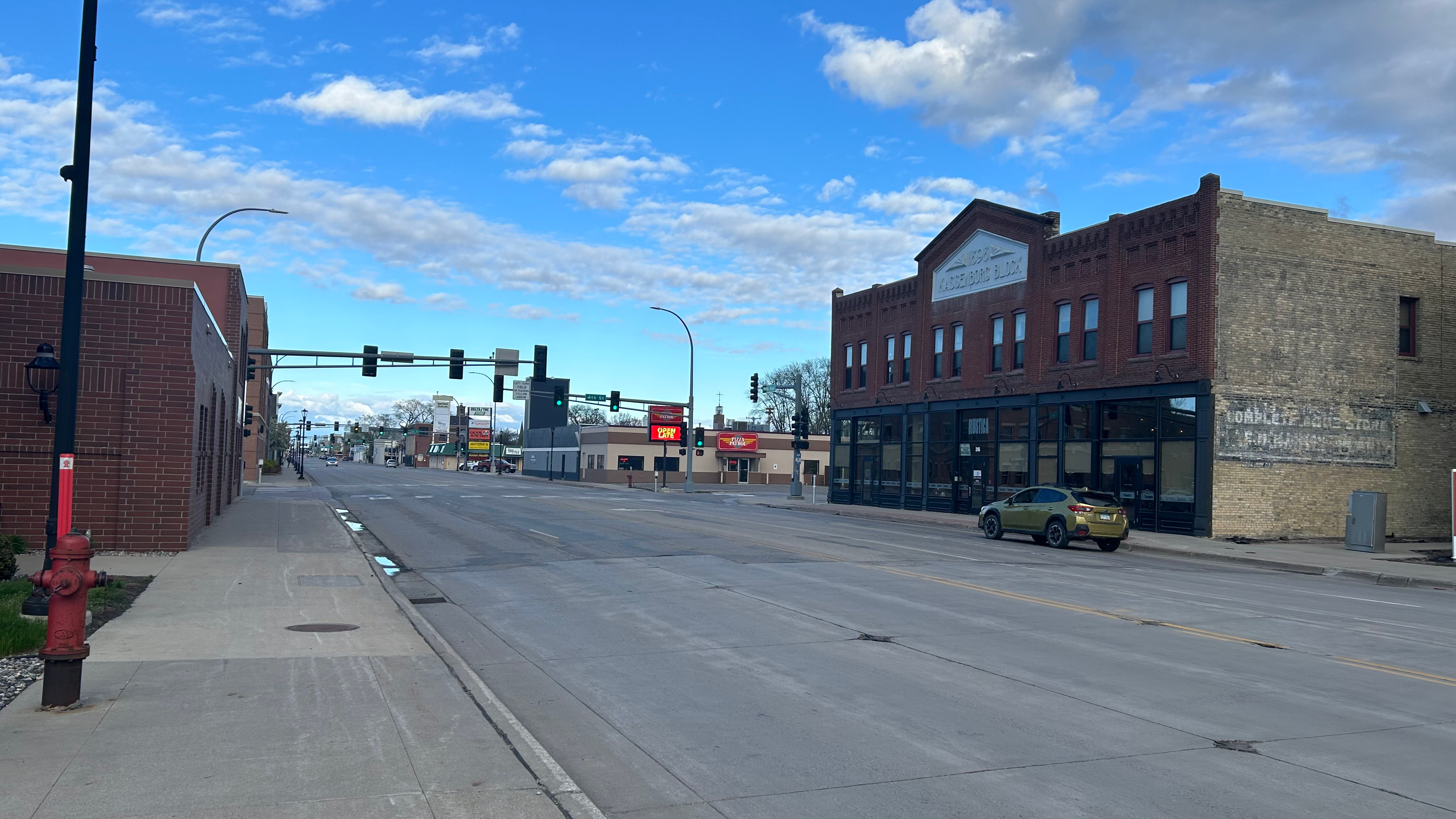
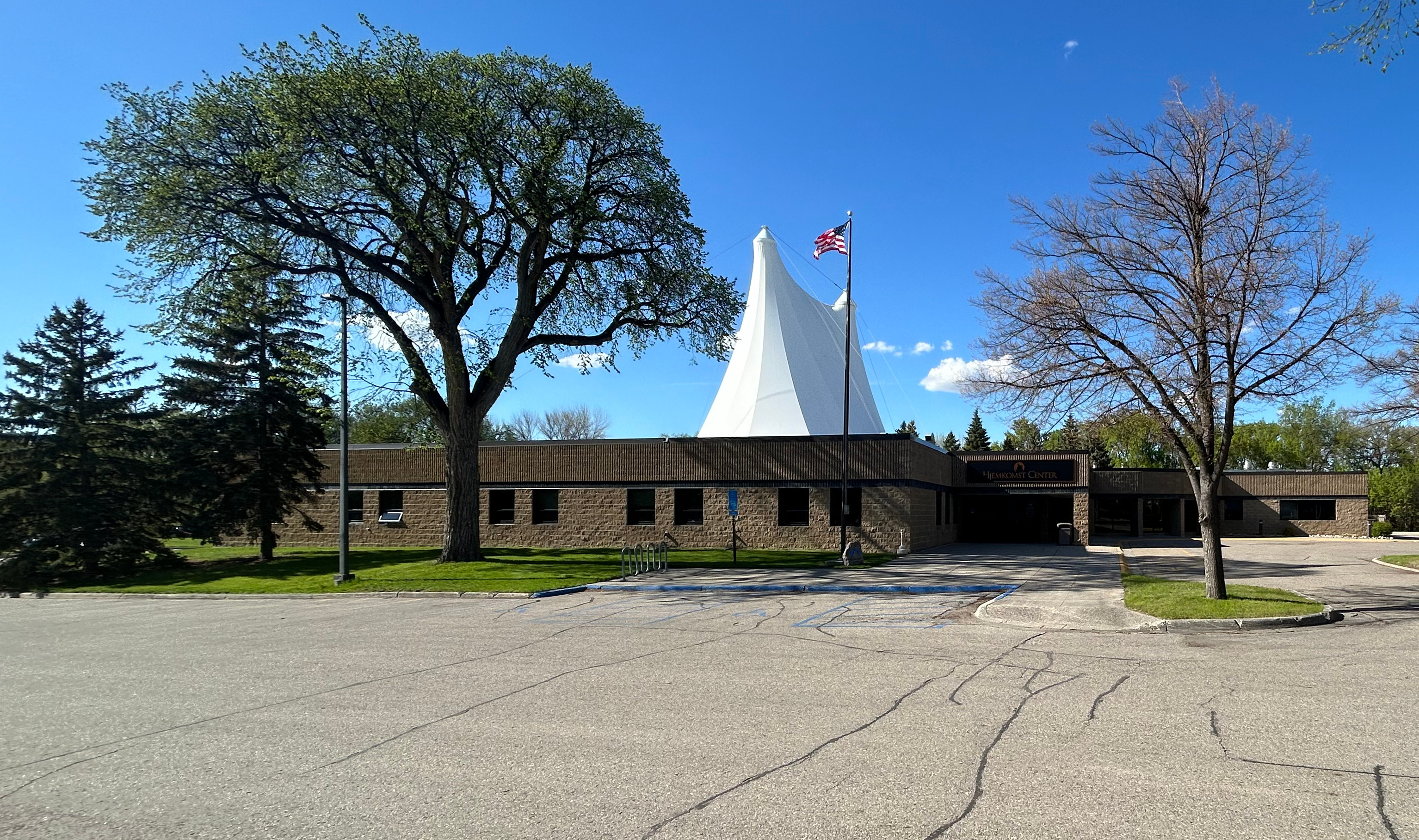
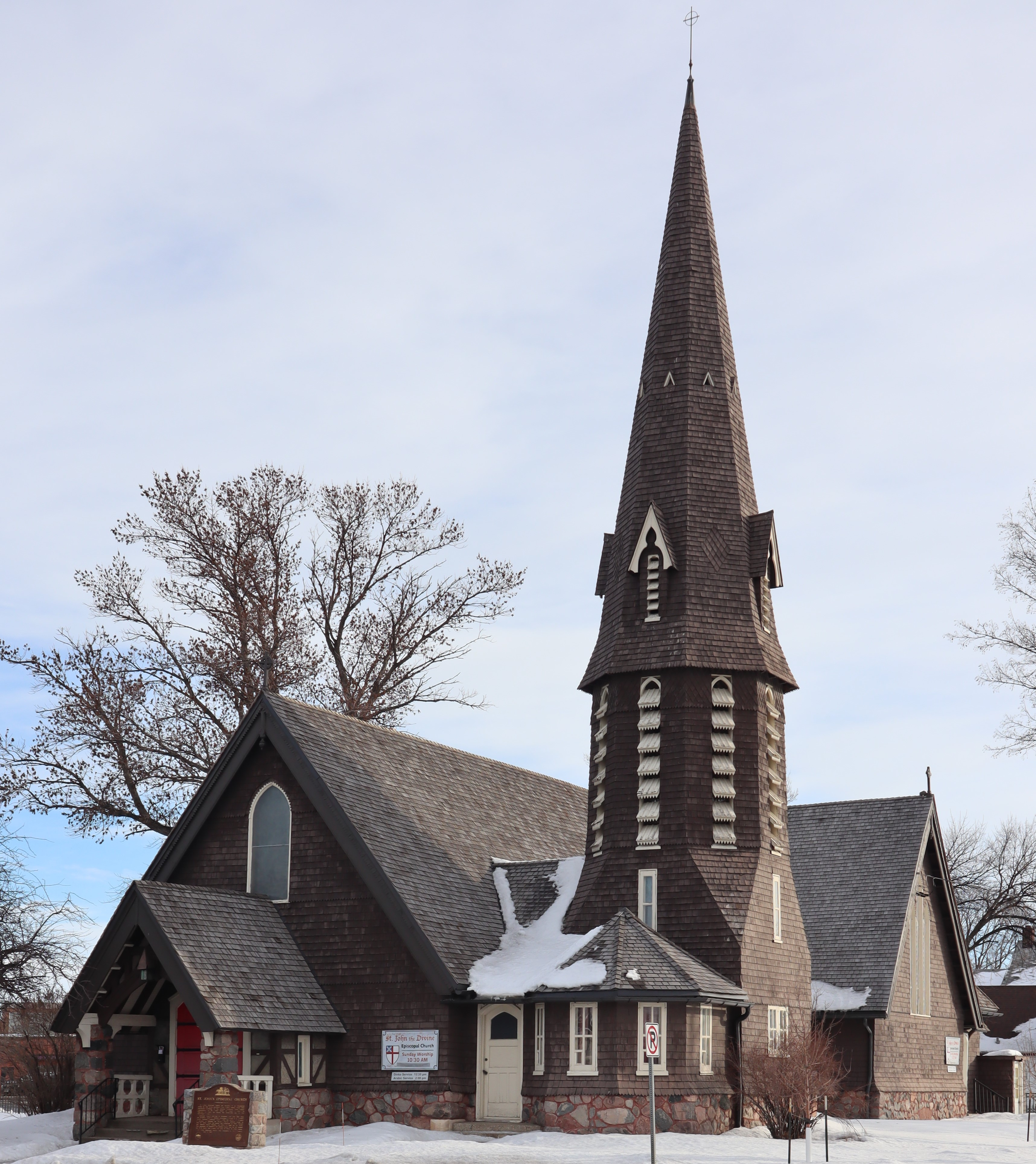
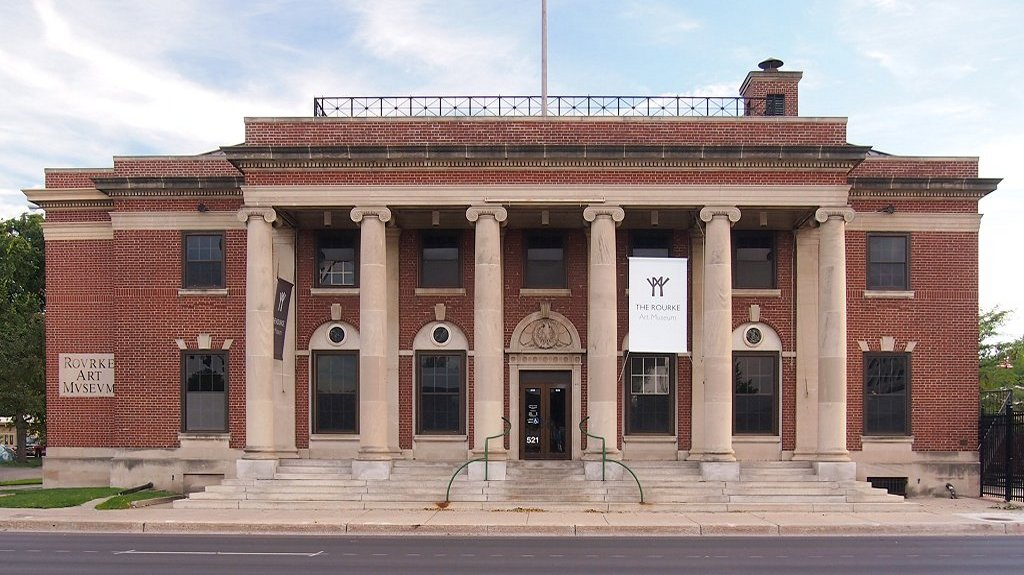
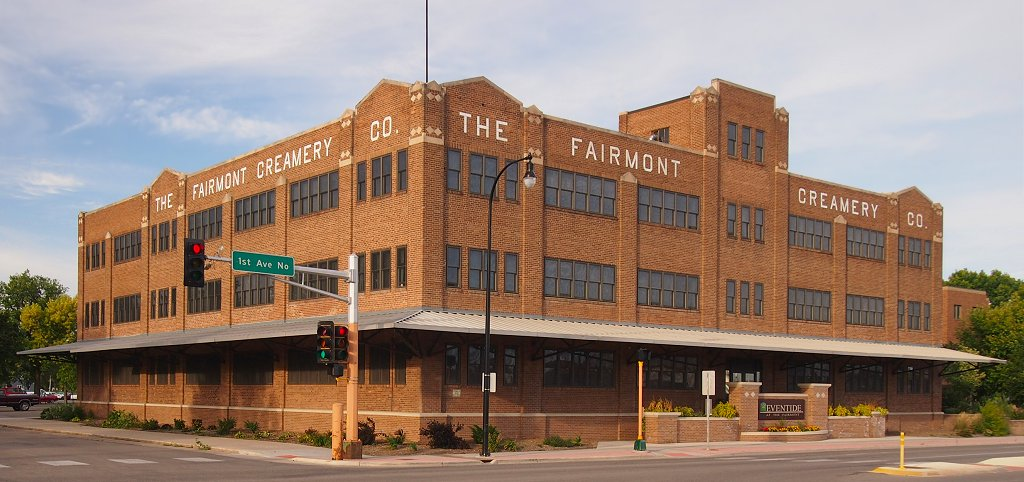
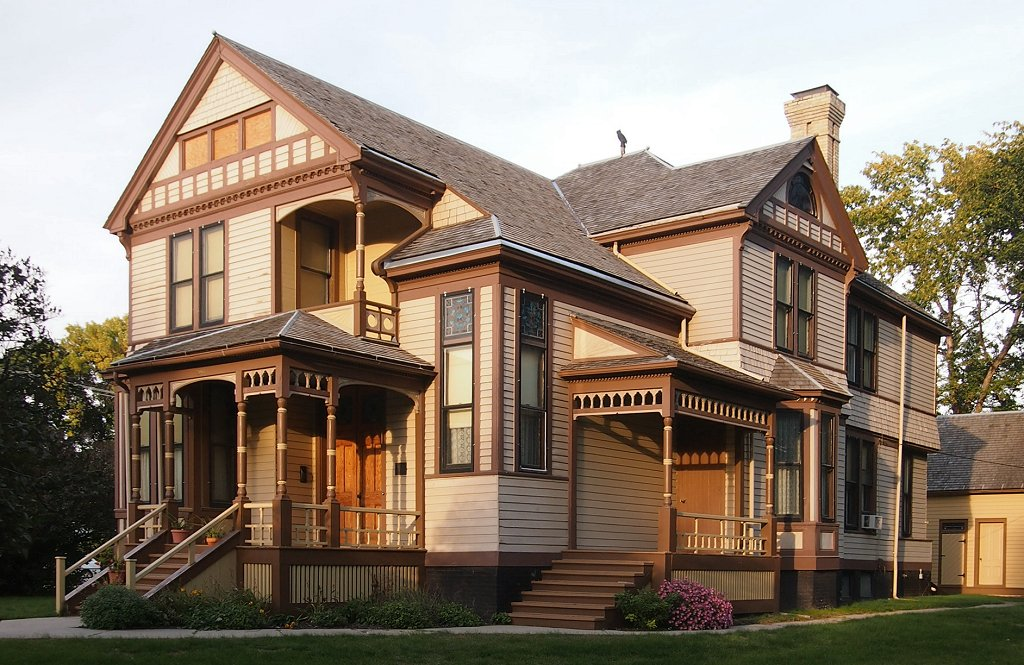
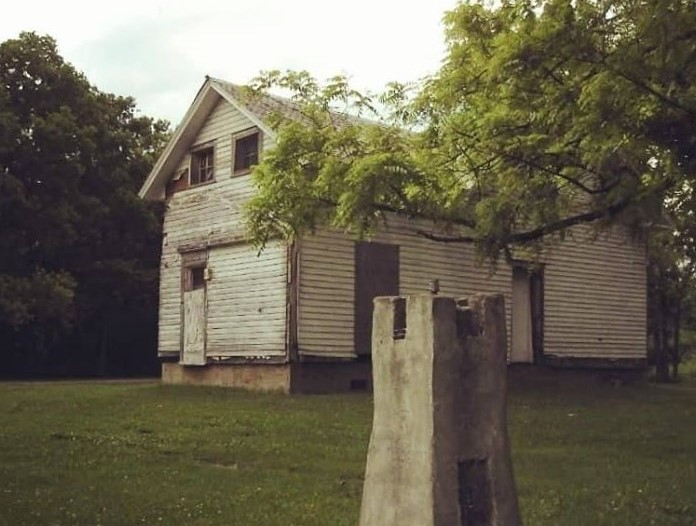
- Downtown Moorhead Hjemkomst Center St. John the Divine Episcopal Church Rourke Art Museum Fairmont Creamery Comstock House Randolph M. Probstfield House

- Motto: "Your Hometown"
- Location within Clay County
- Coordinates: 46°52′26″N 96°46′02″W
- Country: United States
- State: Minnesota
- County: Clay
- Settled: 1871
- Incorporated (village): February 25, 1875
- Incorporated (city): February 24, 1881

Government
  - Mayor: Shelly Carlson
  - Council Members: Ryan Nelson; Matthew Gilbertson; Laura Caroon; Heather Nesemeier; Deb White; Larry Seljevold; Chuck Hendrickson; Sebastian McDougall

Area
  - City: 22.290 sq mi (57.731 km^{2})
  - Land: 22.283 sq mi (57.712 km^{2})
  - Water: 0.0073 sq mi (0.019 km^{2})
- Elevation: 909 ft (277 m)

Population (2020)
  - City: 44,505
  - Estimate (2023): 45,202
  - Density: 2,028/sq mi (783.2/km^{2})
  - Urban: 216,214 (US: 177th)
  - Metro: 262,620 (US: 189th)
- Time zone: UTC−6 (Central (CST))
  - Summer (DST): UTC−5 (CDT)
- ZIP Codes: 56560, 56561, 56562, 56563
- Area code: 218
- FIPS code: 27-43864
- GNIS feature ID: 2395392
- Sales tax: 7.875%
- Website: www.moorheadmn.gov

Moorhead (/ˈmɔːrhɛd/ MOR-hed) is a city in and the county seat of Clay County, Minnesota, United States, on the banks of the Red River of the North. Located in the Red River Valley, an extremely fertile and active agricultural region, Moorhead is home to several corporations and manufacturing industries. Across the river from Fargo, North Dakota and next to Dilworth, Minnesota, Moorhead forms part of the core of the Fargo–Moorhead ND-MN Metropolitan Area. The population was 44,505 at the 2020 census. Moorhead is a hub of higher education in Minnesota, home to Minnesota State University Moorhead, Concordia College, and a campus of Minnesota State Community and Technical College.

Platted in 1871, the city was named for William Galloway Moorhead, an official of the Northern Pacific Railway.

== History ==
The city was platted in 1871 and named for William Galloway Moorhead, a Northern Pacific Railway official and brother-in-law of financier Jay Cooke.

Early on, Moorhead had a reputation as a sin city; since alcohol was prohibited in North Dakota, residents of Fargo and other cities came to Moorhead to drink. In a September 1933 referendum, Clay County voted to reject the Twenty-first Amendment to the United States Constitution, a vote that made it a dry county according to Minnesota law. In April 1937, Clay County voted to allow alcohol sales, with almost half the affirmative votes coming from Moorhead voters.

The former Moorhead Armory on 5th Street South was the site of the intended concert destination for musicians Buddy Holly, Ritchie Valens, and The Big Bopper before their fatal plane crash a few miles north of Clear Lake, Iowa, around 1 a.m. on February 3, 1959. The building was demolished in 1990 and is now the site of Ecumen Evergreens, a senior living property.

Moorhead is home to the first Dairy Queen to sell Dilly Bars. The Moorhead Dairy Queen is also one of only a few Dairy Queens operating on a contract, signed in 1949, that allows it to feature products not approved by corporate headquarters. One example is the chipper sandwich, vanilla ice cream sandwiched between chocolate chip cookies and dipped in chocolate. Every year, the March 1 reopening of the local Dairy Queen after winter is celebrated as a local tradition, despite the cold.

== Geography ==
Moorhead is adjacent to the Red River in the Red River Valley. The land around the Fargo–Moorhead area is some of the world's flattest and richest for agricultural uses. This is because it lies on the bed of glacial Lake Agassiz, which drained between 9,900 and 11,000 years ago.

According to the United States Census Bureau, the city has an area of 22.290 square miles (57.73 km^{2}), of which 22.283 square miles (57.71 km^{2}) is land and 0.007 square miles (0.02 km^{2}) is water.

=== Climate ===
Partly due to its location in the Great Plains, Moorhead has a warm-summer humid continental climate (Köppen climate classification: Dfb), with warm, humid summers and cold winters averaging around 53 inches of snow. The city is in USDA Hardiness zone 4a.

Climate data for Moorhead, Minnesota, 1991–2020 normals, extremes 1881–2016
Month	Jan	Feb	Mar	Apr	May	Jun	Jul	Aug	Sep	Oct	Nov	Dec	Year
Record high °F (°C)	55 (13)	59 (15)	80 (27)	94 (34)	104 (40)	104 (40)	114 (46)	102 (39)	101 (38)	95 (35)	72 (22)	65 (18)	114 (46)
Mean daily maximum °F (°C)	17.2 (−8.2)	22.6 (−5.2)	36.6 (2.6)	54.1 (12.3)	68.5 (20.3)	77.8 (25.4)	81.8 (27.7)	80.5 (26.9)	71.5 (21.9)	55.2 (12.9)	37.8 (3.2)	23.2 (−4.9)	52.2 (11.2)
Daily mean °F (°C)	8.4 (−13.1)	13.3 (−10.4)	27.1 (−2.7)	42.9 (6.1)	56.8 (13.8)	67.1 (19.5)	71.2 (21.8)	69.5 (20.8)	60.0 (15.6)	45.4 (7.4)	29.4 (−1.4)	15.4 (−9.2)	42.2 (5.7)
Mean daily minimum °F (°C)	−0.3 (−17.9)	3.9 (−15.6)	17.7 (−7.9)	31.8 (−0.1)	45.2 (7.3)	56.4 (13.6)	60.7 (15.9)	58.5 (14.7)	48.5 (9.2)	35.5 (1.9)	21.1 (−6.1)	7.6 (−13.6)	32.2 (0.1)
Record low °F (°C)	−48 (−44)	−47 (−44)	−32 (−36)	−13 (−25)	14 (−10)	28 (−2)	39 (4)	32 (0)	17 (−8)	−4 (−20)	−27 (−33)	−36 (−38)	−48 (−44)
Average precipitation inches (mm)	0.73 (19)	0.72 (18)	1.33 (34)	1.72 (44)	3.40 (86)	4.66 (118)	3.37 (86)	2.74 (70)	2.94 (75)	2.51 (64)	1.05 (27)	0.92 (23)	26.09 (664)
Average snowfall inches (cm)	12.2 (31)	7.7 (20)	9.3 (24)	4.0 (10)	0.0 (0.0)	0.0 (0.0)	0.0 (0.0)	0.0 (0.0)	0.0 (0.0)	0.7 (1.8)	8.0 (20)	10.8 (27)	52.7 (133.8)
Average precipitation days (≥ 0.01 in)	9.2	7.3	8.3	8.0	11.8	11.9	10.1	8.6	8.5	8.8	7.6	9.3	109.4
Average snowy days (≥ 0.1 in)	9.8	7.2	5.4	2.1	0.0	0.0	0.0	0.0	0.0	0.9	5.3	9.4	40.1
Source 1: NOAA
Source 2: XMACIS2

== Demographics ==
Historical population
Census	Pop.	Note	%±
1880	1,500		—
1890	2,088		39.2%
1900	3,730		78.6%
1910	4,540		21.7%
1920	5,720		26.0%
1930	7,651		33.8%
1940	9,491		24.0%
1950	14,870		56.7%
1960	22,934		54.2%
1970	29,687		29.4%
1980	29,998		1.0%
1990	32,295		7.7%
2000	32,177		−0.4%
2010	38,065		18.3%
2020	44,505		16.9%
2023 (est.)	45,202		1.6%
U.S. Decennial Census; 2020 Census

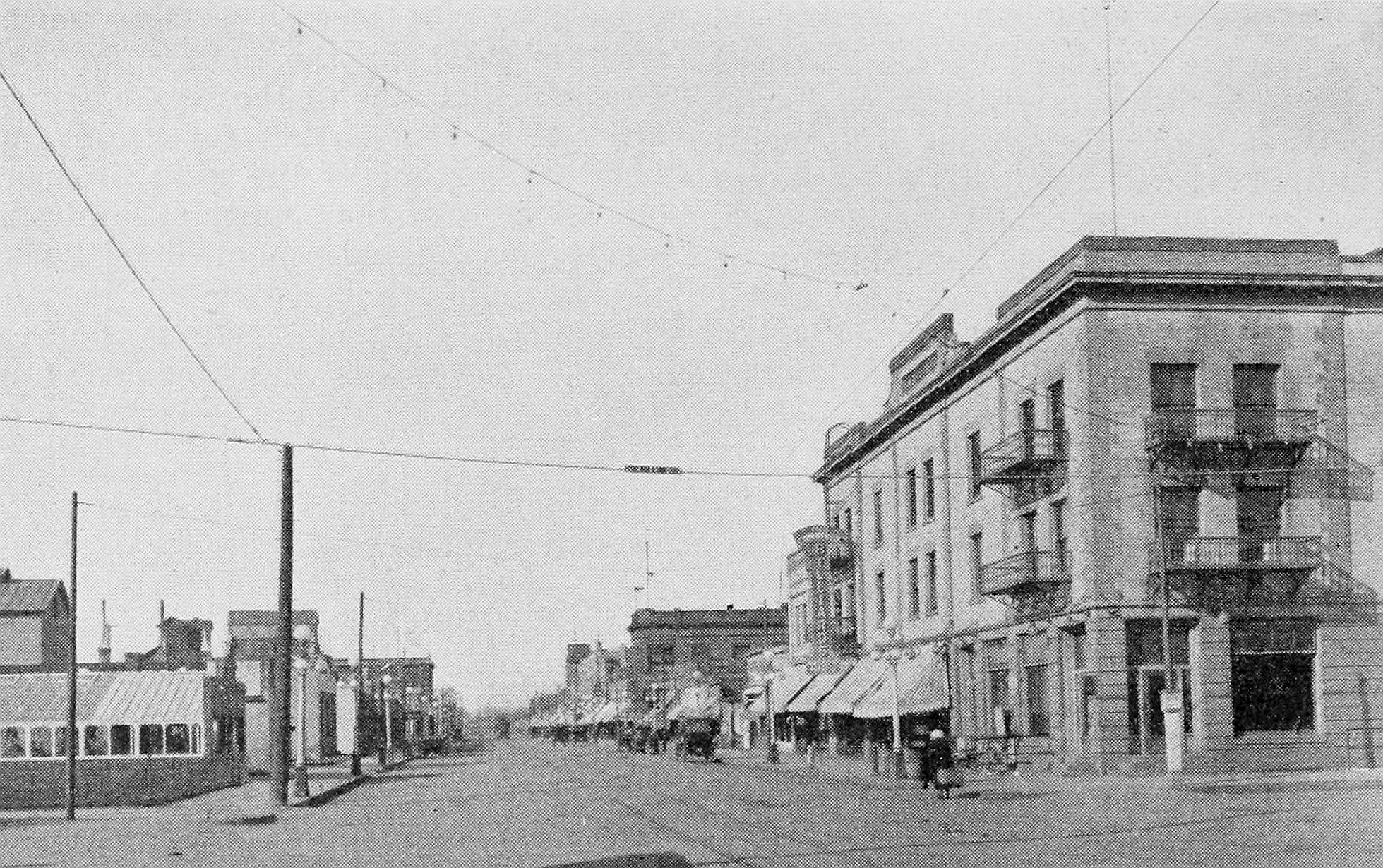
Front Street, 1916

=== Racial and ethnic composition ===
Moorhead city, Minnesota – Racial composition
Race (NH = Non-Hispanic)	2020	2010	2000	1990	1980
White alone (NH)	79.7% (35,491)	88.2% (33,572)	90.1% (29,001)	94.3% (30,452)	97.5% (29,243)
Black alone (NH)	6.6% (2,950)	2% (761)	0.7% (240)	0.5% (150)	0.4% (116)
American Indian alone (NH)	1.9% (854)	1.4% (544)	1.8% (584)	1.3% (425)	0.3% (100)
Asian alone (NH)	1.6% (705)	2% (749)	1.2% (400)	1.1% (349)	0.7% (204)
Pacific Islander alone (NH)	0% (14)	0% (14)	0% (14)		
Other race alone (NH)	0.2% (100)	0.1% (33)	0% (7)	0.1% (29)	0.2% (47)
Multiracial (NH)	4.5% (2,013)	2.1% (816)	1.5% (492)	—	—
Hispanic/Latino (any race)	5.3% (2,378)	4.1% (1,576)	4.5% (1,439)	2.8% (890)	1% (288)

According to the 2018–2022 American Community Survey, the racial composition was as follows:

- White: 85.1% (Non-Hispanic Whites: 82.1%)
- Black or African American: 6.1%
- American Indian: 1.4%
- Asian: 1.8%
- Pacific Islander: 0.2%
- Some other race: 1.6%
- Two or more races: 5.0%
- Hispanic or Latino (of any race): 5.1%

=== 2020 census ===
As of the 2020 census, Moorhead had a population of 44,505. The population density was 1,998.7 inhabitants per square mile (771.7/km^{2}). The median age was 31.9 years. 24.1% of residents were under the age of 18, including 6.8% under 5, and 13.0% of residents were 65 years of age or older. For every 100 females there were 96.2 males, and for every 100 females age 18 and over there were 93.6 males age 18 and over.

98.7% of residents lived in urban areas, while 1.3% lived in rural areas.

There were 17,063 households and 10,064 families in the city. Of these households, 31.1% had children under the age of 18 living in them. Of all households, 43.1% were married-couple households, 21.0% were households with a male householder and no spouse or partner present, and 28.1% were households with a female householder and no spouse or partner present. About 31.8% of all households were made up of individuals and 11.0% had someone living alone who was 65 years of age or older.

There were 18,348 housing units, of which 7.0% were vacant. The homeowner vacancy rate was 1.6% and the rental vacancy rate was 10.4%.

Racial composition as of the 2020 census
Race	Number	Percent
White	36,304	81.6%
Black or African American	2,997	6.7%
American Indian and Alaska Native	936	2.1%
Asian	720	1.6%
Native Hawaiian and Other Pacific Islander	16	0.0%
Some other race	701	1.6%
Two or more races	2,831	6.4%
Hispanic or Latino (of any race)	2,378	5.3%

The most reported ancestries in 2020 were:

- German (33.6%)
- Norwegian (25%)
- Irish (11.6%)
- English (10.5%)
- Swedish (6.8%)
- French (4.2%)
- Mexican (3.8%)
- Scandinavian (3.3%)
- Polish (3%)
- Scottish (2.4%)

=== Ethnic communities ===
The Moorhead area also has a Kurdish community of about 3,500.

=== 2010 census ===
As of the 2010 census, there were 38,065 people, 14,304 households, and 8,372 families residing in the city. The population density was 1,922.3 inhabitants per square mile (742.2/km^{2}). There were 15,274 housing units at an average density of 771.4 per square mile (297.8/km^{2}). The racial makeup of the city was 90.7% White, 2.0% African American, 1.5% Native American, 2.0% Asian, 1.1% from other races, and 2.6% from two or more races. Hispanic or Latino of any race were 4.1% of the population.

There were 14,304 households, of which 29.4% had children under the age of 18 living with them, 43.5% were married couples living together, 10.6% had a female householder with no husband present, 4.4% had a male householder with no wife present, and 41.5% were non-families. 29.2% of all households were made up of individuals, and 10% had someone living alone who was 65 years of age or older. The average household size was 2.41 and the average family size was 2.97.

The median age in the city was 28.3 years. 20.9% of residents were under the age of 18; 23.7% were between the ages of 18 and 24; 23.4% were from 25 to 44; 20.5% were from 45 to 64; and 11.5% were 65 years of age or older. The gender makeup of the city was 48.4% male and 51.6% female.

=== 2006–2008 American Community Survey ===
According to the 2006–2008 American Community Survey, the top ten European ancestries were the following:

- Norwegian: 36.1%
- German: 36.0%
- Swedish: 7.6%
- Irish: 7.2%
- English: 4.7%
- French: 3.7%
- Polish: 3.6%
- American: 2.3%
- Italian: 1.5%
- Dutch: 1.4%

=== 2000 census ===
As of the 2000 census, there were 32,177 people, 11,660 households, and 7,030 families living in the city. The population density was 2,394.3 inhabitants per square mile (924.4/km^{2}). There were 12,180 housing units at an average density of 906.3 inhabitants per square mile (349.9/km^{2}). The racial makeup of the city was 92.08% White, 0.77% African American, 1.94% Native American, 1.27% Asian, 0.04% Pacific Islander, 2.10% from other races, and 1.79% from two or more races. Hispanic or Latino of any race were 4.47% of the population.

There were 11,660 households, out of which 31.4% had children under the age of 18 living with them, 47.3% were married couples living together, 9.8% had a female householder with no husband present, and 39.7% were non-families. 29.2% of all households were made up of individuals, and 11.1% had someone living alone who was 65 years of age or older. The average household size was 2.43 and the average family size was 3.04.

In the city, the population was spread out, with 22.7% under the age of 18, 23.1% from 18 to 24, 24.2% from 25 to 44, 17.2% from 45 to 64, and 12.8% who were 65 years of age or older. The median age was 29 years. For every 100 females, there were 88.4 males. For every 100 females age 18 and over, there were 83.3 males.

The median income for a household in the city was $34,781, and the median income for a family was $49,118. Males had a median income of $33,137 versus $23,717 for females. The per capita income for the city was $17,150. About 8.2% of families and 16.3% of the population were below the poverty line, including 14.9% of those under age 18 and 6.4% of those age 65 or over.

== Politics ==
Presidential election results 1960–2024

Precinct General Election Results
Year	Republican	Democratic	Third parties
2024	41.8% 8,875	55.7% 11,810	2.4% 520
2020	40.6% 8,459	56.7% 11,809	2.7% 555
2016	41.0% 7,893	48.7% 9,390	10.3% 1,983
2012	41.3% 7,609	55.8% 10,278	2.9% 530
2008	39.3% 7,249	58.8% 10,840	1.9% 359
2004	50.0% 8,515	48.5% 8,254	1.5% 247
2000	48.8% 6,930	44.7% 6,357	6.5% 929
1996	42.9% 5,424	50.0% 6,334	7.1% 903
1992	42.2% 6,257	42.7% 6,321	15.1% 2,238
1988	49.0% 6,541	51.0% 6,800	0.0% 0
1984	53.3% 7,060	46.7% 6,174	0.0% 0
1980	46.3% 5,496	37.2% 4,406	16.5% 1,956
1976	51.5% 6,711	46.7% 6,079	1.8% 235
1972	56.4% 7,100	42.5% 5,349	1.1% 134
1968	53.9% 5,168	43.0% 4,124	3.1% 301
1964	43.5% 4,005	56.1% 5,159	0.4% 33
1960	62.0% 5,154	37.8% 3,146	0.2% 15

== Transportation ==
Moorhead has multiple transportation options, with intercity buses, trains, and air travel available in Fargo. Locally, the city is served by MATBUS. Interstate 94 and U.S. Highways 10, 52 (concurrent with I-94), and 75 are four of the city's main roadways. Other routes in the Fargo–Moorhead area include Interstate 29, U.S. 81, and Minnesota State Highway 336.

== Economy ==
Agriculture is prominent in the area, and Moorhead hosts corporate, manufacturing, and distribution industries, including American Crystal Sugar (corporate headquarters and sugar beet processing), Busch Agricultural Resources (malt manufacturing), and Pactiv (container manufacturing). The unemployment rate is consistently below the national average and property values are stable.

=== Top employers ===
According to the City's 2023 Annual Comprehensive Financial Report, the largest employers in the city are:

#	Employer	# of Employees	Percentage
1	Moorhead Area Public Schools ISD #152	900	2.39%
2	Concordia College	784	2.09%
3	Minnesota State University Moorhead	750	1.99%
4	American Crystal Sugar Company	648	1.72%
5	Creative Care for Reaching Independence (CCRI)	475	1.26%
6	Eventide Lutheran Home	400	1.06%
7	Cash Wise Foods	299	0.80%
8	City of Moorhead	284	0.72%
9	Minnesota State Community and Technical College	137	0.36%
10	Access of Red River Valley	120	0.32%
—	Total employers	4,797	12.71%

== Arts and culture ==
The Rourke Art Gallery and the Rourke Art Museum are native Moorhead cultural institutions hosting the annual Midwestern Invitational Exhibition. The museum displays an important art collection from local, regional, and national artists. The Rourke Museum is housed in the historic Moorhead Post Office building.

The city is also home to the Bluestem Amphitheater, a 3,000-seat outdoor amphitheater that opened in 2009 with a partnership between the Fargo Public Schools, the City of Moorhead, and an arts grant from the state of Minnesota. Bluestem hosts a summer concert series that has drawn bands including Wilco, Goo Goo Dolls, The Beach Boys, and Weezer.

The Bluestem Amphitheater is home to Trollwood Performing Arts School, a renowned summer arts and theater program for students of all ages.

The Comstock House is a historic house museum, a blend of Queen Anne and Eastlake styles built in 1883. Solomon Comstock was a lawyer and U.S. representative.

=== Hjemkomst Center ===
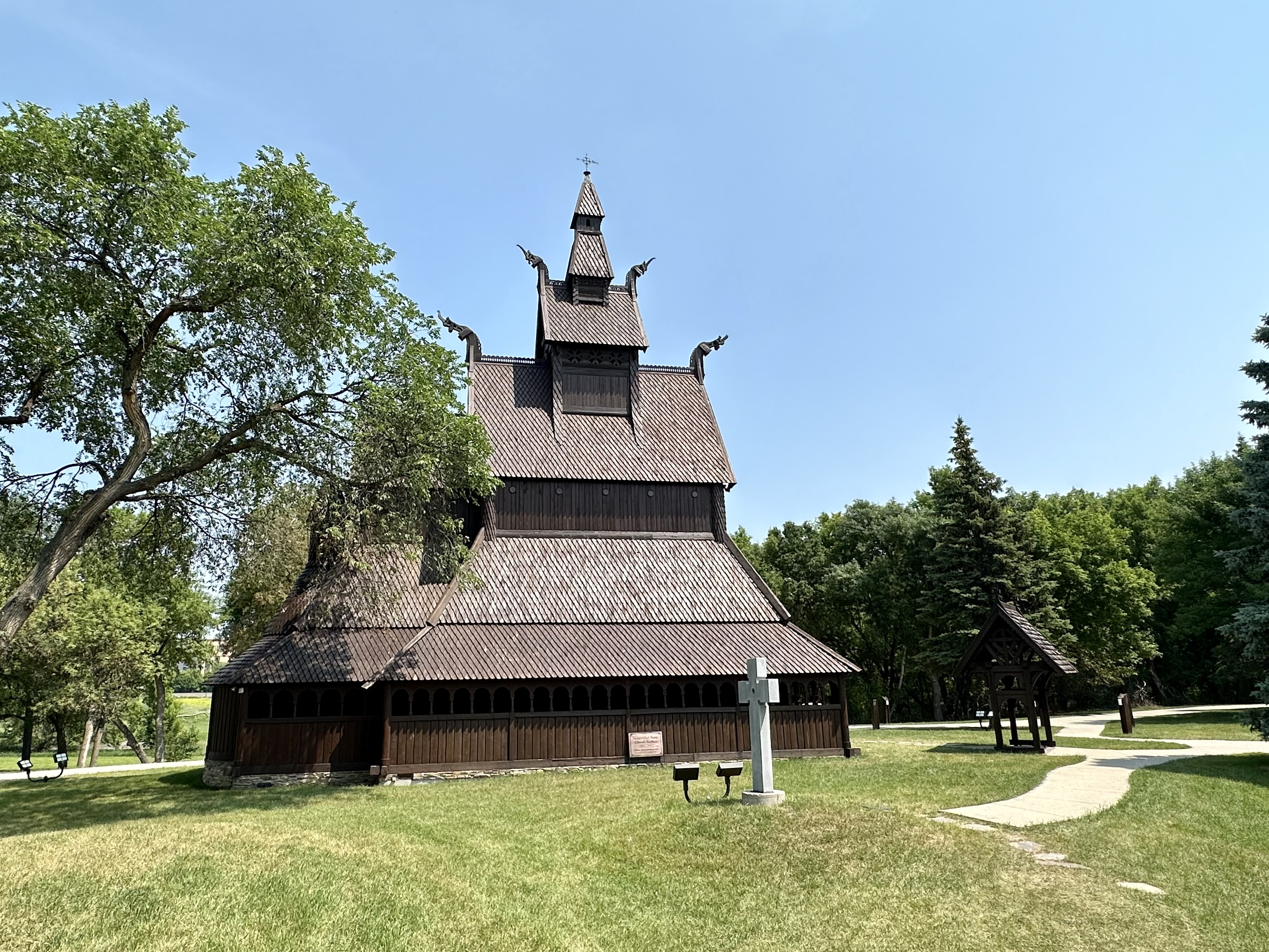
Replica of Norwegian stave church at the Hjemkomst Center.

The Hjemkomst Center is a museum containing a full-scale replica of a Viking ship of the same name. The Hjemkomst vessel was built in nearby Hawley by Moorhead resident Robert Asp, and was sailed from Duluth to Oslo, Norway, in 1982 by his children after his death. It is now permanently housed in the center.

The Clay County Museum and Archives, operated by the Clay County Historical Society, interprets Clay County history in a free museum in the Hjemkomst Center's lower level. The Society has more than 30,000 artifacts in its collection, one of the largest and most important historic collections in Minnesota outside the Minneapolis-St. Paul area.

On the grounds of the Hjemkomst Center is a stave church. The traditional Norwegian-style church serves as a symbol of Norwegian heritage in the Red River Valley. The church is a full-scale replica of the Hopperstad Stave Church in Vik, Norway.

=== Museums ===
- Comstock House – a historic house museum.
- Hjemkomst Center – displays and interprets the Hjemkomst replica Viking ship that was sailed to Norway. It is also home to the Clay County Historical Society museum and archives and features a replica Norwegian Hopperstad Stave Church.
- Rourke Art Museum – displays fine art.

=== Theaters ===
- Bluestem Amphitheater – a 3,000 seat outdoor amphitheater.
- The Gooseberry Park Players – a not-for-profit, fee-free theater company for people aged 11 to 18. Every July, it presents a show at the Horizon Middle School's Performing Arts Center.
- Theatre B – programming includes Mainstage productions; a Sunday Salon discussion series; an Incubator for new play development; Community Collaborations; college internships; B Emerging Artist Training (BEAT); and B AT HOME.
- Trollwood Performing Arts School – a summer theater arts program for students of all ages. The school presents many different forms of performing arts every summer, the most prominent being a Broadway musical performed in front of up to 2,500 audience members per night at an outdoor amphitheater.

=== Parks ===
- Gooseberry Mound Park – offers a playground, cross country ski trails, and fat tire bike trails
- M.B. Johnson Park – offers walking and biking trails, picnic tables, and a playground. In the winter, the Moorhead Park District hosts sleigh rides.

== Sports ==
The Fargo-Moorhead RedHawks is an independent professional baseball team that plays at Newman Outdoor Field in Fargo. It is part of the American Association.

Interstate Raceway is a dragstrip and drifting race facility southeast of Moorhead. It has a 0.25 mi (0.40 km) dragstrip and a concrete drift track.

== Education ==
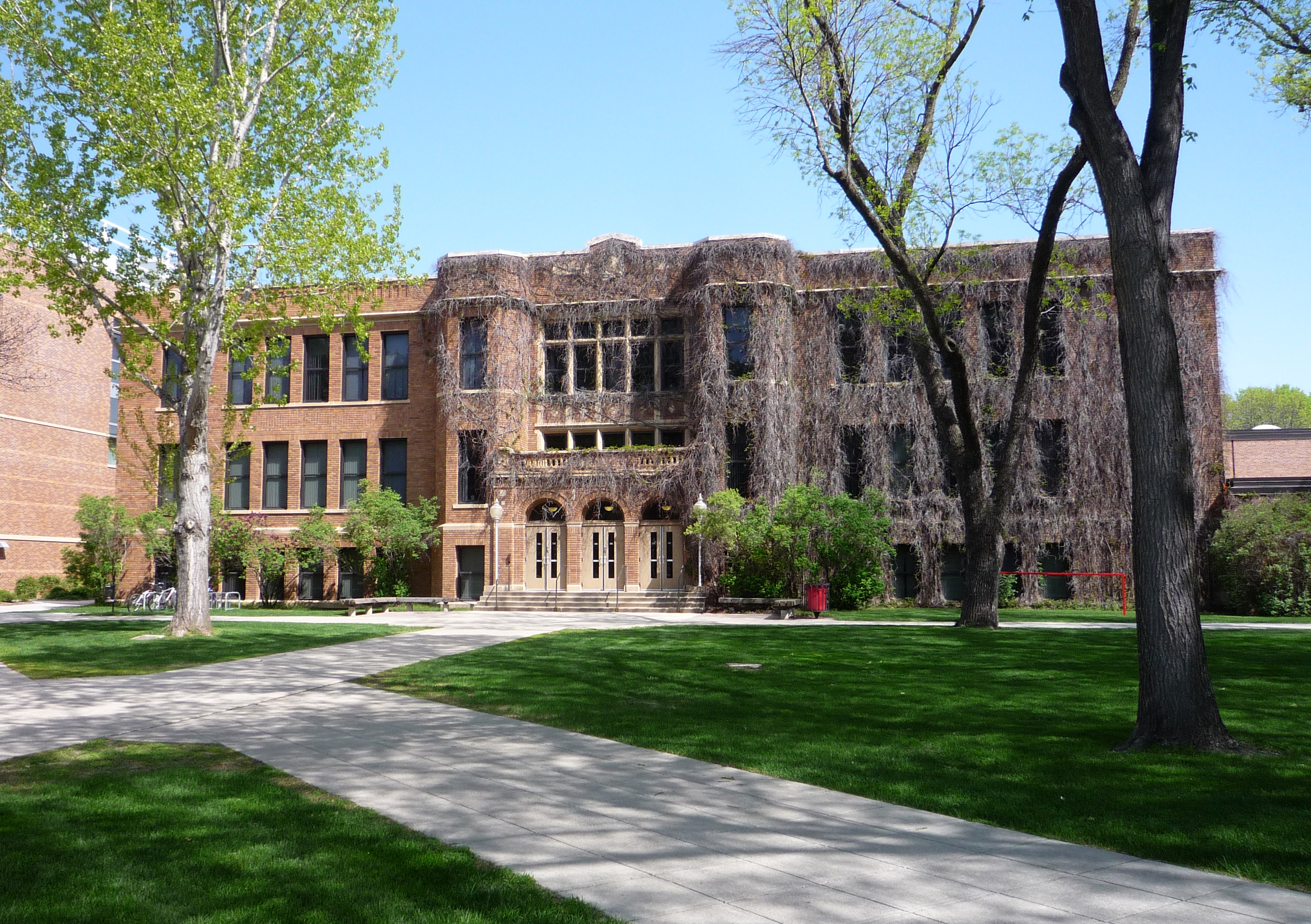
Weld Hall on the campus of Minnesota State University Moorhead

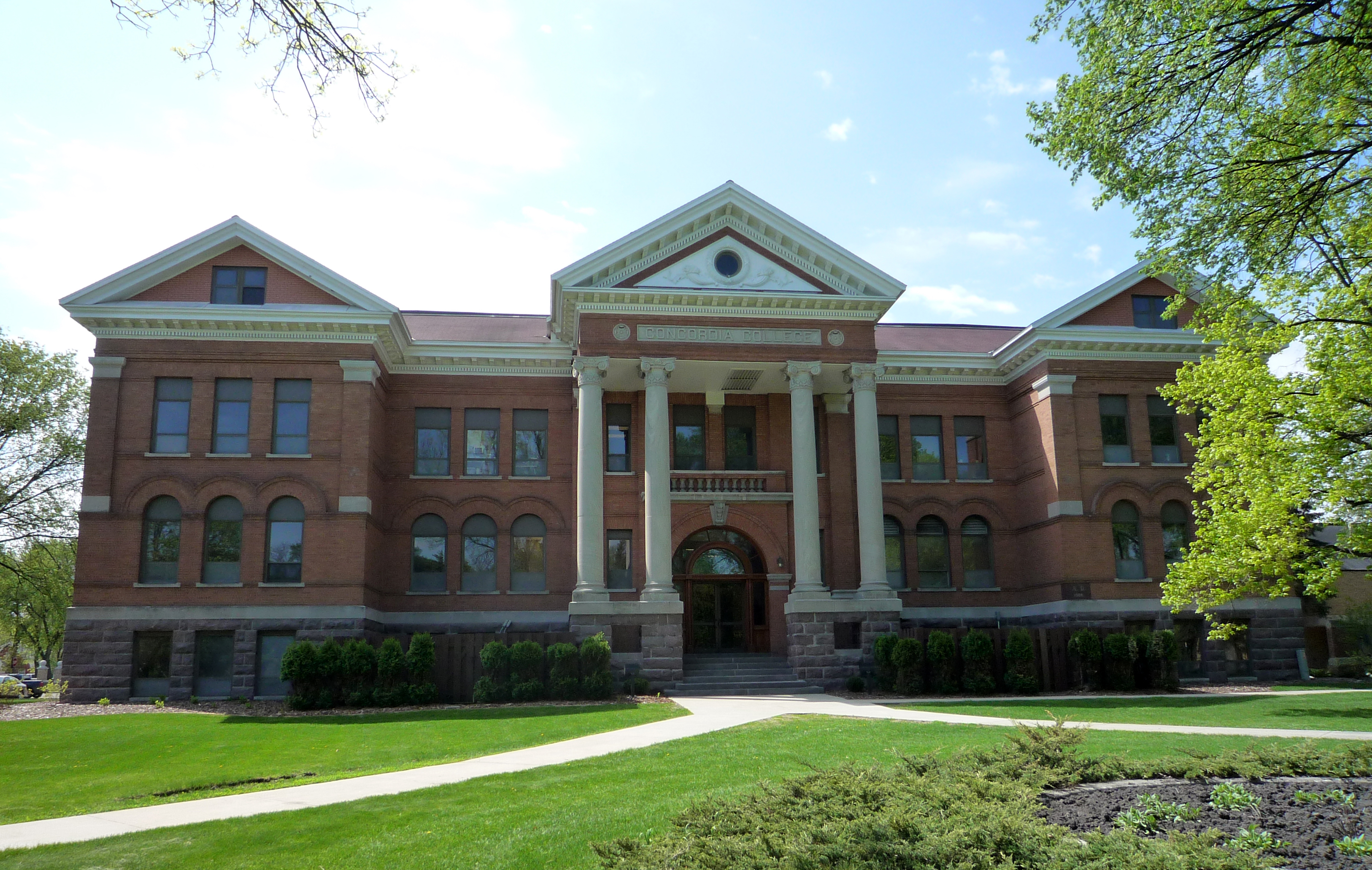
Old Main on the campus of Concordia College

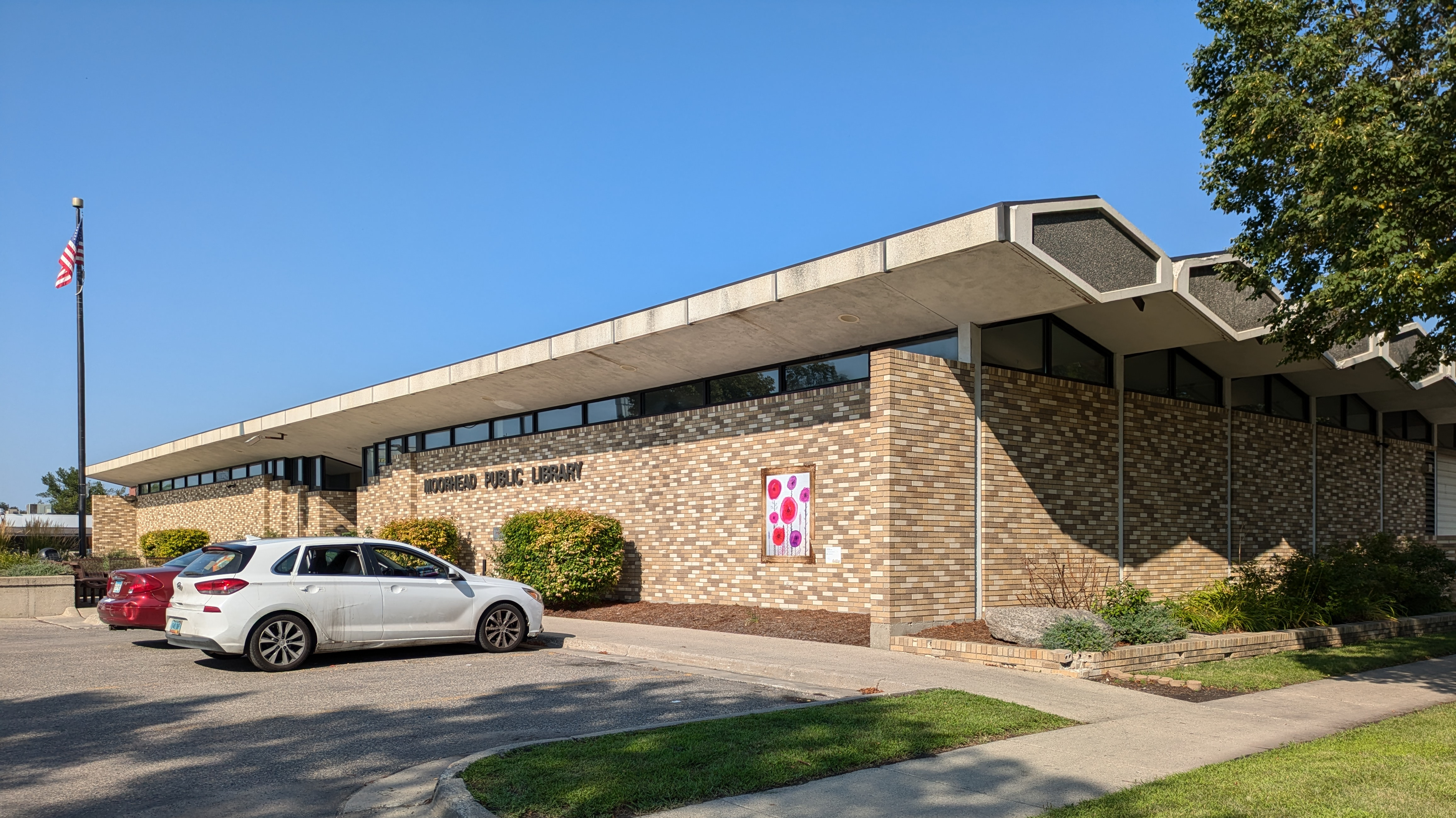
The former Moorhead Public Library, in use from 1962 until 2026.

The city has four institutions of higher learning: Concordia College (a private Christian liberal arts college), Minnesota State University Moorhead (a public university), Minnesota State Community and Technical College (a two- to four-year technical college), and Rasmussen University (a two- to four-year college). These colleges' combined student enrollment is about 14,000.

K-12 education is provided to over 5,000 students by the Moorhead School District: S.G. Reinertsen Elementary, Robert Asp Elementary, Ellen Hopkins Elementary, Dorothy Dodds Elementary, Horizon Middle School, and Moorhead High School. The district is known for its high achievement, with students consistently performing above the national average on the ACT. The district includes the cities of Moorhead, Georgetown, Kragnes, and Sabin.

The city includes the Red River Area Learning Center and the Probstfield Center for Education.

Park Christian School is a private Christian school in Moorhead providing a K–12 education. St. Joseph's is a PreK-8 Catholic parochial school.

The first public library was built in 1906 at 102 6th Street South. The original library was funded by Andrew Carnegie and designed by architect Milton Earl Beebe. The second library was then built in 1962 and was located at 118 5th Street South. The current public library was built in 2026 and is located at 450 Center Ave. It is part of the Lake Agassiz Regional Library system. In addition to library services, the library acts as a community center by providing an indoor walking loop, an indoor playground, and community spaces.

The current Moorhead Public Library, in use since 2026.

== Healthcare ==
Sanford Health Moorhead Clinic is part of the Sanford Health network, providing comprehensive healthcare services to residents of Moorhead and nearby areas. The clinic offers family medicine, radiology, lab services, immunizations, and mammograms.

Moorhead is also a key provider of senior healthcare services. The Moorhead Senior Citizens Center serves as a community hub for local seniors, offering a space for social activities and gatherings. Eventide Lutheran Home in Moorhead provides a range of care services, including assisted living, memory care, and long-term care for elderly residents.

== Media ==
- The Forum of Fargo-Moorhead, regional newspaper printed in Fargo
- High Plains Reader, news weekly
- Minnesota Public Radio, Concordia College hosts an MPR bureau
- Moorhead Community Access Media, local access cable TV programming on channels 12 and 99
- NDSU Spectrum
- MSUM Advocate
- The Extra, legal newspaper of record for the City of Moorhead

== Notable people ==
- Felix Battles (1840s–1907) – early settler of Moorhead and African American Civil War veteran
- Jason Blake – NHL player
- Will Borgen – NHL player
- René Clausen – composer and conductor of The Concordia Choir
- Ada Comstock – first full-time president of Radcliffe College
- Solomon Comstock – member of the Minnesota Legislature
- Matt Cullen – NHL player
- William B. Dosland – state senator and lawyer
- Wallace B. Douglas – jurist, lawyer, and politician
- Becky Gulsvig – actress
- Loren D. Hagen – U.S. Army Special Forces Green Beret and Medal of Honor recipient
- Dwaine Hoberg – football coach and mayor of Moorhead
- Kenneth J. Kludt – state legislator and lawyer
- Ryan Kraft – NHL player
- Mark Ladwig – figure skater
- Morrie Lanning – politician and mayor of Moorhead
- Brian Lee – NHL player
- Warren G. Magnuson – U.S. senator
- Thomas McGrath – poet, screenwriter, English professor
- Adolph Murie – biologist, author, ecologist
- Olaus Murie – biologist, author, ecologist
- Sliv Nemzek – college football and basketball coach and mayor of Moorhead
- Wally O'Neill – NFL player
- Collin Peterson – U.S. representative for Minnesota's 7th congressional district (attended college in Moorhead)
- Leslie Stefanson – actress
- Henry C. Stiening – member of the Minnesota Senate and mayor of Moorhead
- Karl Truesdell – U.S. Army major general
- Merlyn Orville Valan – state legislator
- Chris VandeVelde – NHL player
- Diane Wray Williams – state legislator
- Roy Williams – NFL player
- Annella Zervas – nun at Saint Benedict's Monastery and Servant of God

== See also ==
- Fairmont Creamery
- Fargo-Moorhead Toll Bridge
- List of mayors of Moorhead, Minnesota
- Northern Lights Library Network
