= Comstock =

Comstock may refer to:

== Places ==
- Comstock Northwest, Michigan, a census-designated place
- Comstock Park, Michigan, a census-designated place and unincorporated community
- Comstock Township, Michigan
- Comstock, Minnesota, a city
- Comstock Township, Marshall County, Minnesota
- Comstock, Nebraska, a village
- Comstock Township, Custer County, Nebraska
- Comstock, Texas, an unincorporated community
- Comstock, Wisconsin, an unincorporated community
- Comstock (crater), a lunar crater

== Ships ==
- USS Comstock (LSD-19), a dock landing ship of the United States Navy
- USS Comstock (LSD-45), a dock landing ship of the United States Navy

== Other uses ==
- Comstock (surname), including a list of people with the name
- Comstock Hall (Ithaca, New York), a building of Cornell University
- Comstock High School, near Kalamazoo, Michigan
- Comstock Lode and mines in Virginia City, Nevada
- Comstock canned pie filling, line of products sold by the Duncan Hines brand; see Pinnacle Foods
- Comstock Music Festivals, a series of music festivals near Comstock, Nebraska
- Comstock Prison, the former name of Great Meadow Correctional Facility in New York State
- Comstock Prize in Physics, awarded by the U.S. National Academy of Sciences
- Comstock Scoring, the scoring method used in International Practical Shooting Confederation (IPSC) shooting competitions
- Comstock Tram, at two locations in West Coast, Tasmania

== See also ==
- Comstock laws, anti-obscenity laws in the United States
- United States v. Comstock, a decision by the Supreme Court of the United States
