= National Register of Historic Places listings in Clay County, Minnesota =

Location of Clay County in Minnesota

This is a list of the National Register of Historic Places listings in Clay County, Minnesota. It is intended to be a complete list of the properties and districts on the National Register of Historic Places in Clay County, Minnesota, United States. The locations of National Register properties and districts for which the latitude and longitude coordinates are included below, may be seen in an online map.

There are 22 properties and districts listed on the National Register in the county.

This National Park Service list is complete through NPS recent listings posted April 24, 2026.

== History ==
Clay County's National Register properties reflect its significance as a transportation corridor and major agricultural region. The Red River of the North and the Red River Trails were important early routes, but Euro-American settlement was light. The Randolph M. Probstfield House, John Bergquist House, and Bernard Bernhardson House are the preserved homes of some of Clay County's earliest settlers. The construction of two major rail lines in the early 1870s fuelled a great increase in population and agriculture, and cemented the importance of Moorhead as a commercial hub. From the 1870s to the 1920s, large bonanza farms carved from railroad land grants gave way to diversified family outfits like the Wulf C. Krabbenhoft Farmstead. The John Olness House, Solomon Gilman Comstock House, and Burnham Building are associated with individuals who prospered in land speculation and other commercial activities.

== Current listings ==
| | Name on the Register | Image | Date listed | Location | City or town | Description |
|---|---|---|---|---|---|---|
| 1 | Barnesville City Hall and Jail | Barnesville City Hall and Jail | May 7, 1980 (#80002009) | Front and Main Sts. 46°39′12″N 96°25′14″W | Barnesville | Well preserved example of a small-town municipal complex, an 1899 city hall/fire station/opera house with a circa-1910 jail. |
| 2 | John Bergquist House | John Bergquist House | May 7, 1980 (#80002014) | 719 10th Ave. N. 46°53′09″N 96°46′08″W | Moorhead | 1870 log cabin of John G. Bergquist, an early settler arriving in 1869 and notable figure in Moorhead's development. |
| 3 | Bernard Bernhardson House | Bernard Bernhardson House | May 7, 1980 (#80002011) | County Road 59; 46°41′35″N 96°47′07″W | Comstock vicinity | 1870 log cabin built by an early homesteader as a temporary dwelling; Clay County's best preserved example of subsistence log architecture. |
| 4 | Buffalo River State Park WPA/Rustic Style Historic Resources | Buffalo River State Park WPA/Rustic Style Historic Resources | October 25, 1989 (#89001671) | Off U.S. Route 10 east of Glyndon; 46°51′53″N 96°28′04″W | Glyndon vicinity | Six park facilities built 1937–1940, significant as examples of New Deal federal work relief, the early development of Minnesota's state parks, and split stone architecture. |
| 5 | Burnham Building | Burnham Building | May 7, 1980 (#80002013) | 420 Main Ave. 46°52′26″N 96°46′23″W | Moorhead | Only remaining example of the false-front buildings once common to downtown Moorhead; a commercial/residential property built circa 1880 for early businessman and land speculator Frank Burnham. |
| 6 | Comstock Public School | Comstock Public School | May 7, 1980 (#80002012) | Main St. 46°39′38″N 96°45′03″W | Comstock | School building constructed 1909–1911, noted for its architecture. |
| 7 | Solomon Gilman Comstock House | Solomon Gilman Comstock House | December 30, 1974 (#74001011) | 506 8th St. S. 46°52′08″N 96°46′03″W | Moorhead | 1883 house of Solomon Comstock, a founder and leading citizen of Moorhead from his arrival in 1871 to his death in 1933. Also noted as the city's top example of late Victorian architecture. Now a Minnesota Historical Society museum. |
| 8 | District No. 3 School | | January 11, 2023 (#100008545) | 10389 280th St. S. 46°44′28″N 96°13′04″W | Parke Township | One-room school in use 1892–1961; Clay County's first rural school district and last to consolidate into a larger district, attesting to residents' values on providing a basic, locally controlled education. |
| 9 | Fairmont Creamery | Fairmont Creamery | February 10, 1983 (#83000901) | 801 2nd Ave. N. 46°52′35″N 96°46′02″W | Moorhead | 1923 creamery instrumental in moving the Red River Valley away from monocultural cash crop farming into diversified agriculture. Also noted as an example of 1920s industrial architecture. |
| 10 | Federal Courthouse and Post Office | Federal Courthouse and Post Office | May 7, 1980 (#80002015) | 521 Main Ave. 46°52′25″N 96°46′16″W | Moorhead | 1915 Neoclassical landmark in downtown Moorhead, also noted as a local example of a federal government building and for its adaptive reuse. Now the Rourke Art Museum. |
| 11 | Grong Lutheran Church | | February 5, 2026 (#100012688) | 10240 Highway 32 S. 46°44′36″N 96°14′16″W | Rollag | Intact example of a style distinctive to early Norwegian-American Lutheran churches, built in two phases 1881–82 and 1891–92. |
| 12 | Lew A. Huntoon House | Lew A. Huntoon House | May 7, 1980 (#80002016) | 709 8th St. S. 46°52′01″N 96°46′06″W | Moorhead | Moorhead's only English cottage-style house, built in 1910 for the director of the Moorhead State Normal School and now the official residence of the Concordia College president. |
| 13 | Wulf C. Krabbenhoft Farmstead | | May 7, 1980 (#80002021) | County Road 69; 46°47′26″N 96°37′34″W | Sabin vicinity | Leading example of a Red River Valley family farm, with five contributing properties built 1890–1905. |
| 14 | Main Building, Concordia College | Main Building, Concordia College | May 7, 1980 (#80002017) | S. 8th St. 46°51′56″N 96°46′08″W | Moorhead | Most notable building at Concordia College and Moorhead's leading example of Neoclassical architecture, built in 1906. |
| 15 | Frederick Martin Hotel | | October 29, 2025 (#100012383) | 403 Center Ave. 46°52′30″N 96°46′25″W | Moorhead | 1950 hotel noted for its distinctive International Style architecture. |
| 16 | Moorhead Storage and Transfer Company Warehouse | Moorhead Storage and Transfer Company Warehouse | January 10, 2020 (#100004863) | 1010 Center Ave. 46°52′31″N 96°45′51″W | Moorhead | 1922 trackside potato warehouse, a reminder of an important regional crop and its industrialization, and a rare vestige of Moorhead's former warehousing and manufacturing district. |
| 17 | John Olness House | John Olness House | May 7, 1980 (#80002018) | U.S. Route 75; 46°59′31″N 96°45′10″W | Georgetown vicinity | 1902 house of a prosperous local merchant and land speculator; also noted for its Neoclassical façade and Queen Anne details. Now an event venue called A Friend's House. |
| 18 | Park Elementary School | Park Elementary School | December 22, 1988 (#88003013) | 121 6th Ave. S. 46°52′05″N 96°46′37″W | Moorhead | Moorhead's oldest school building—constructed in 1900—and only surviving example of its small neighborhood schools in use before the Post–World War II baby boom. |
| 19 | Patterson-Hernandez House | Patterson-Hernandez House | May 7, 1980 (#80002010) | 404 Main Ave. W 46°39′11″N 96°25′33″W | Barnesville | Unusual and architecturally sophisticated Queen Anne house built 1898–1900 of fieldstone with some frame sections. |
| 20 | Randolph M. Probstfield House | Randolph M. Probstfield House | May 7, 1980 (#80002019) | 4555 Oakport St. N 46°55′20″N 96°45′09″W | Moorhead vicinity | 1869 house of one of Clay County's first settlers and a local leader in politics, education, and agricultural development from his arrival in 1859 to his death in 1911. |
| 21 | St. John the Divine Episcopal Church | St. John the Divine Episcopal Church | May 7, 1980 (#80002020) | 120 S. 8th St. 46°52′23″N 96°46′02″W | Moorhead | Shingle Style church built 1898–99, considered Moorhead's leading architectural landmark and one of Cass Gilbert's most interesting churches. |
| 22 | Hannah C. and Peter E. Thompson House | Hannah C. and Peter E. Thompson House | February 23, 1996 (#96000173) | 361 2nd St. N.E. 46°39′23″N 96°25′05″W | Barnesville | 1903 Neoclassical house designed by the Hancock Brothers for Barnesville founders and leading citizens Peter (1852–1905) and Hannah Thompson (1857–1920). |

== See also ==
- List of National Historic Landmarks in Minnesota
- National Register of Historic Places listings in Minnesota
