= Comstock Township =

Comstock Township may refer to the following places in the United States:

- Comstock Township, Michigan
- Comstock Township, Minnesota
- Comstock Township, Custer County, Nebraska
