= Ada Comstock =

American women's education administrator (1876–1973)

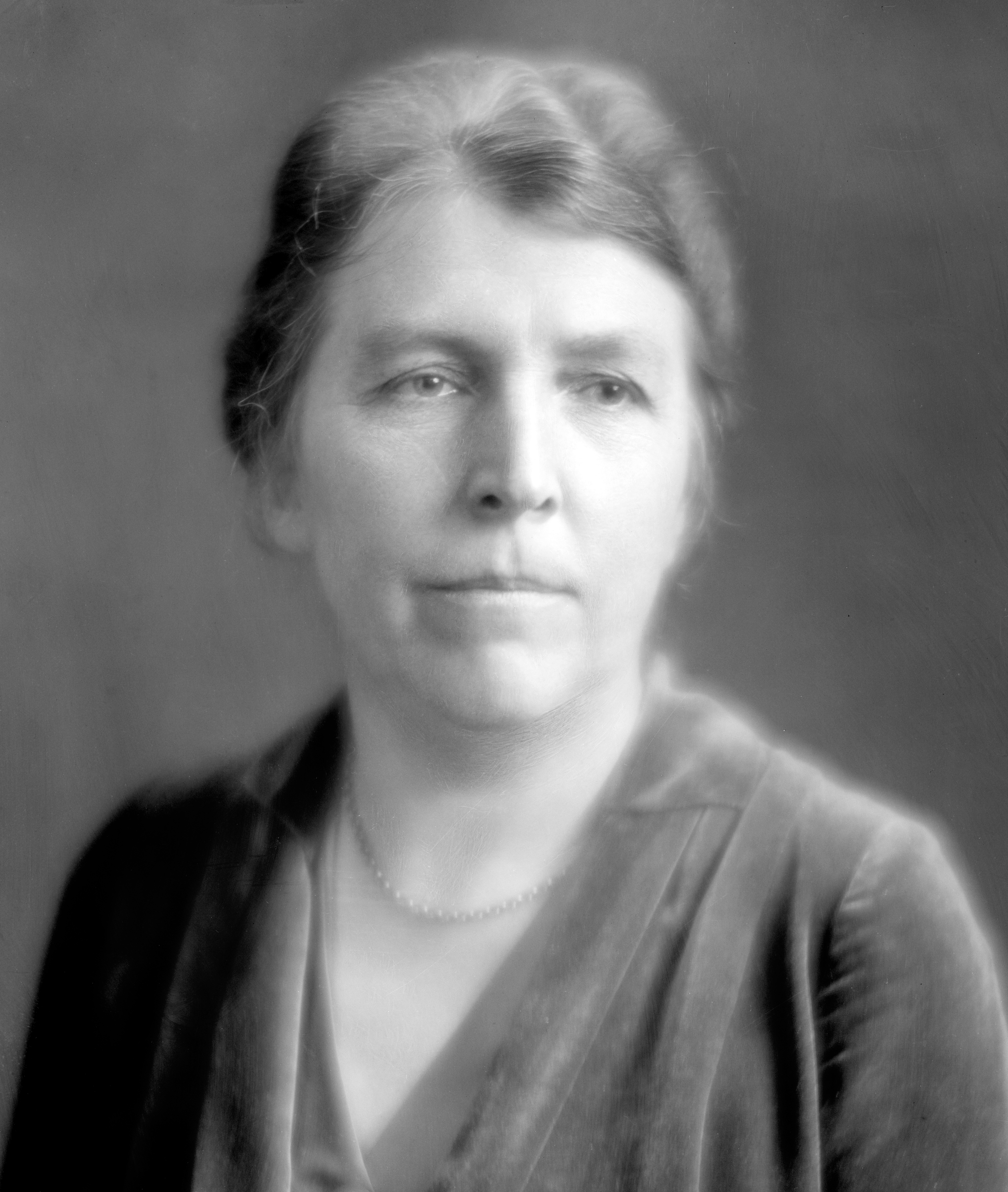
- Comstock in 1905
- Born: Ada Louise Comstock; December 11, 1876; Moorhead, Minnesota, US
- Died: December 12, 1973 (aged 97); New Haven, Connecticut, US
- Other name: Ada Comstock Notestein
- Education: Smith College; Columbia University
- Title: President of Radcliffe College
- Term: 1923–1943
- Predecessor: LeBaron Russell Briggs
- Successor: Wilbur Kitchener Jordan
- Spouse: Wallace Notestein (m. 1943)

Ada Louise Comstock (December 11, 1876 – December 12, 1973) was an American women's education pioneer. She served as the first dean of women at the University of Minnesota and later as the first full-time president of Radcliffe College.

== Early life and education ==
Ada Louise Comstock was born on December 11, 1876, in Moorhead, Minnesota, to Solomon Gilman Comstock, an attorney, and Sarah Ball Comstock. Her father recognized her capabilities and potential and set about to cultivate them by encouraging an early and sound education for his daughter. The oldest of three children, Comstock graduated from Moorhead High School at age 15.

Comstock began her undergraduate studies at the University of Minnesota in 1892, where she was a member of Delta Gamma woman's fraternity. After two years, she transferred to Smith College, graduating in 1897.

As a Smith student, Ada often questioned the established rules and norms of college life. While a resident of Hubbard House, she was given a case of champagne which the housemother felt should be given away. Instead, in what was characteristically her spirit, she decided to store it in the water cooler to refresh her friends.

She returned to Minnesota to complete a graduate course in teaching at Moorhead Normal School (now Minnesota State University, Moorhead), then went to Columbia University for graduate work in English, History, and Education, where she earned a master's degree in 1899.

== Career ==
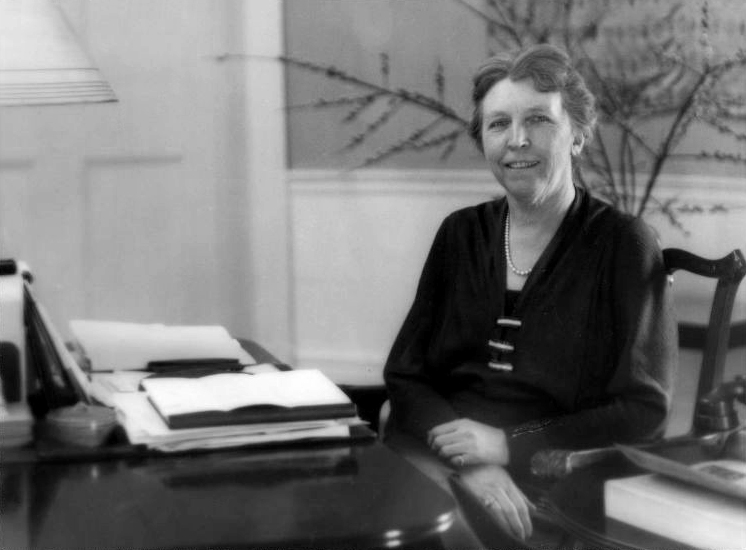
Comstock at Radcliffe College, where she served as its president from 1923 to 1943

Comstock began her career at the University of Minnesota, where she was an assistant in the rhetoric department under Maria L. Sanford. She was promoted to the position of instructor in 1900 and assistant professor in 1904. She was appointed the school's first dean of women in 1907 and a full professor in 1909. She was instrumental in improving the quality of life for the women of the college, arguing persistently that a college was responsible for one's physical and intellectual well-being.

In 1912, Comstock came to Smith as the first ever Dean of the College and to teach English. Particularly challenging to her was the opportunity to advise and teach young women in an all-female institution. One of the most important tenets of her educational philosophy was the inculcation in young women of self-respect, one aspect of which was knowing how to employ oneself. Comstock believed very strongly throughout her life that a college education should inspire women to take a part in the shaping of the world. In 1917, when the Presidency of Smith College became vacant, she was given the responsibility of its operation for approximately six months, but was neither given the title of acting President nor was she considered for the position. Despite Comstock's significant and numerous contributions to the College, Smith was not ready for its first woman President.

From 1921 to 1923, Ada Comstock served as president of the Association of Collegiate Alumnae, now known as the American Association of University Women (AAUW). She was a founding member and one of the five American voting delegates to the first conference of the International Federation of University Women in London in 1920 and at the second in Paris in 1922. One of their objects was the forwarding of higher education for women in every country in the world. She was active in other areas in public life as well. In 1929, she was the only woman named by President Herbert Hoover to an eleven-person commission to study problems of law enforcement. She was a president of the American Academy of Arts and Sciences, Vice Chairman of the American Council of Institute of Pacific Relations and served on the National Committee for Planned Parenthood.

On October 20, 1923, Comstock was inaugurated as president of Radcliffe College. Her colleague at the AAUW, Frances Fenton Bernard, succeeded her as Dean of Smith College in the spring of 1924. Comstock spent twenty years leading the school, strengthening its academic programs and, in 1943, persuaded Harvard to accept classroom coeducation. Also under President Comstock, Radcliffe was able to launch a nationwide admission program, improve student housing, construct new classroom buildings, and expand the graduate program. When Radcliffe celebrated its 75th anniversary in 1954, Comstock was called "the chief architect of the greatness of this college".

In addition to her academic career, Comstock was appointed to the National Committee on Law Observation and Enforcement, known as the Wickersham Commission, in 1929.

After her retirement from Radcliffe, Comstock remained active in academia, serving on the Smith board of trustees, working on a graduate center for Radcliffe, and traveling extensively in support of her husband's research.

== Personal life ==
A week after her retirement from Radcliffe in 1943, Comstock married Wallace Notestein, a professor emeritus at Yale University. They had met in Minnesota decades before, but Comstock had focused on her academic career, as her father wished. Neither had married in the intervening years. Notestein died in 1969.

== Death ==
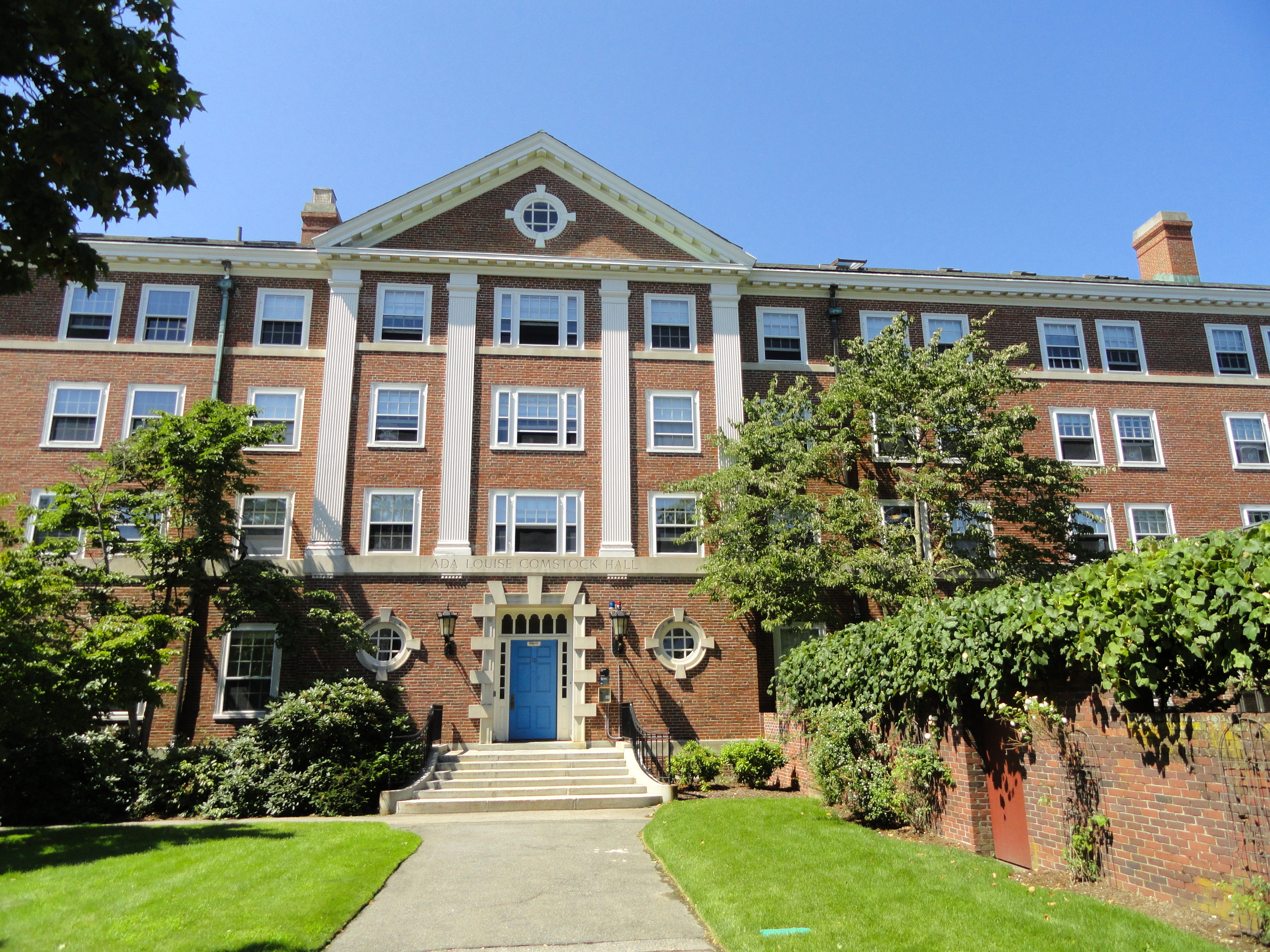
Ada Louise Comstock Hall on Radcliffe Quadrangle at Harvard University, named in Comstock's honor

On December 12, 1973, Notestein died of congestive heart failure at her home in New Haven, Connecticut.

== Legacy ==
The largest collection of her papers, the Ada Louise Comstock Papers, 1897–1950, are housed at the Smith College Archives.

Comstock has been honored with named buildings on college and university campuses, including Comstock Hall at the University of Minnesota, Comstock Hall in the Radcliffe Quad, and Comstock House residence hall at Smith College. She is also the namesake of Smith College's Ada Comstock Scholars Program, a transfer program for students who are not of a traditional college age. Smith College hosts a lecture series named for her as well.

Her childhood home is maintained as a historic site by the City of Moorhead and the Minnesota Historical Society.

== Awards and honors ==
- 1943: Fellow of the American Academy of Arts and Sciences
- 1958: Jane Addams Medal, Rockford College
- 1966: Founder's Award, Radcliffe College
- 1967: Hollins Medal
