= Dowse Sod House =

Historic house in Nebraska, United States

- William R. Dowse House
- U.S. National Register of Historic Places
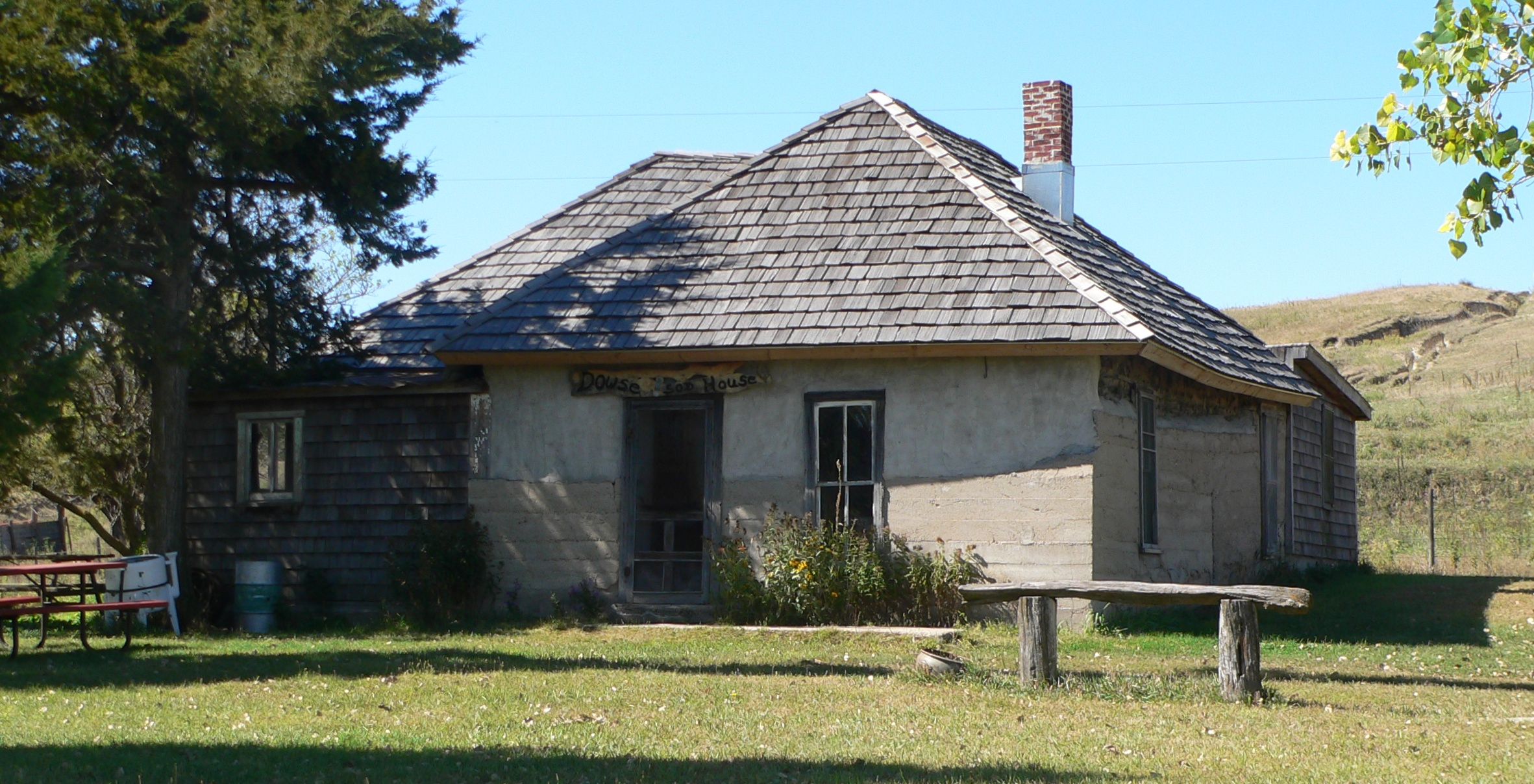
- View from the northeast.

- Location within Nebraska Location within the United States
- Location: 80560 Oak Grove Rd.
- Nearest city: Comstock, Nebraska
- Coordinates: 41°30′39.9″N 99°15′40.7″W
- Built: 1900
- NRHP reference No.: 86003365

The William R. Dowse House, more commonly known as the Dowse Sod House, is a sod house in Custer County in the central portion of the state of Nebraska, in the Great Plains region of the United States. It was built in 1900 and occupied until 1959. After a long period of neglect, it was restored beginning in about 1981, and opened as a museum in 1982.

The house is listed in the National Register of Historic Places, as "an excellent example of the sod house phenomenon", and as one of the few surviving sod houses in Nebraska.

== Sod houses on the Great Plains ==
The Homestead Act of 1862 was a major factor in opening the Great Plains to white settlement. Under the provisions of the Act, settlers could obtain title to a quarter-section (160 acres, or 65 ha) of land for a nominal fee, provided that they built a house, made certain improvements, farmed the land, and occupied the site for at least five years.

Settlers in the regions east of the Missouri River had found ample trees with which to build log houses. The eastern quarter of Nebraska was also well supplied with timber. However, as settlers moved further west, they encountered the treelessness that had led Major Stephen H. Long, exploring the region in 1820, to label it the "Great American Desert". Especially before the arrival of the railroad, the cost of importing building materials was prohibitive; and many homesteaders had spent all that they had on farming equipment, and could barely afford the filing fees for their land claims.

There is no consensus among scholars regarding the origin of sod construction on the Plains. Some maintain that the inspiration came from the earth lodges of the local native peoples, including the Omahas and the Pawnees. However, these earth lodges were circular in cross-section, and built upon heavy timber frameworks. It has also been suggested that the idea of building with sod came from European immigrants, either Russian-Germans, who are known to have built rammed earth dwellings in the Plains, or immigrants from the British Isles, particularly from Ireland, where turf houses were built with stone foundations and frames to support the turf. None of these closely resembled the unframed sod-block houses built in the Midwestern United States, but they might have engendered the idea of building with earth.

A simple sod house could be built in about a week, and for a cost of less than five dollars. Cost was not the only advantage. The thick walls provided insulation against summer heat and winter cold; the latter was particularly important in light of the dearth of firewood on the plains, which forced the early settlers to burn corncobs, twisted grass, or dried buffalo dung. The walls also withstood prairie winds better than framed walls; even sod houses struck by tornadoes generally survived with no worse damage than the loss of the roof, leaving the walls standing. Sod houses also provided a safe refuge against prairie fires, especially when surrounded by a plowed and back-burned firebreak.

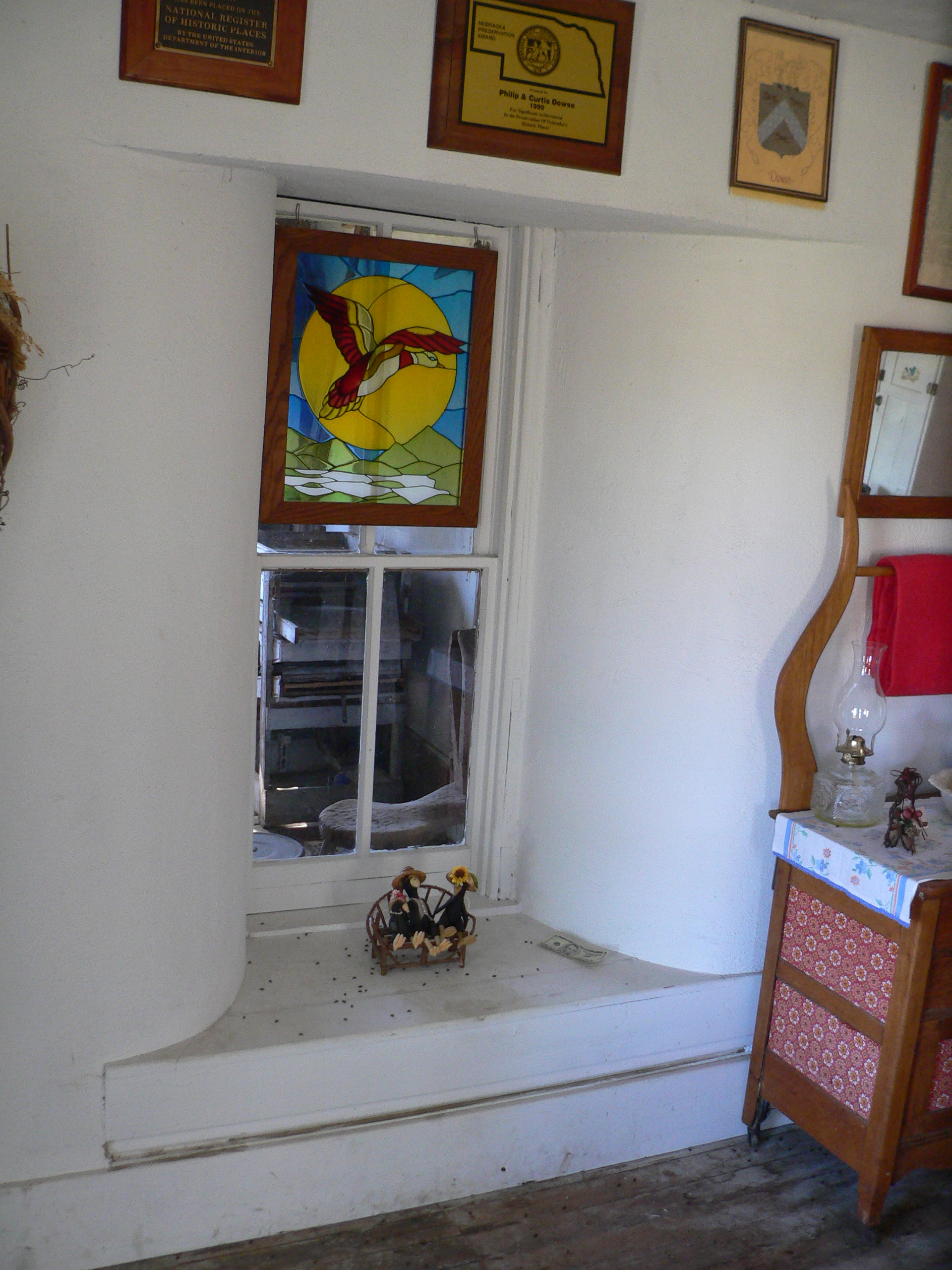
South-facing kitchen window. Note thickness of wall and beveling of window well.

The sod house was not without its disadvantages, however. Initially, at least, most had dirt floors, which had to be sprinkled with water to abate dust. To protect against invasion by rodents, insects, and snakes, the interior walls were often shaved smooth and plastered with lime, or with a mixture of local clay and sand or ashes; the lower portions of the exterior walls could also be reinforced, with planks or concrete if they were available, or with a second layer of sod to thicken them. Leaky roofs were also a problem; to protect the inhabitants and the interior furnishings from falling water, dirt, and vermin, it was common to make a ceiling of a white muslin sheet tacked to the walls. Since windows were one of the most expensive elements of a sod house, pioneers on a budget were often forced to make do with windows that were small and few in number; a light muslin ceiling and plastered walls helped to illuminate the house by reflecting daylight through the interior.

Sod houses continued to be occupied and built even after wood for construction became available. A number of contemporary photographs show occupied sod houses adjacent to frame barns and outbuildings. The Dowse house was built in 1900, although the Burlington and Missouri River Railroad had reached the nearby town of Comstock in 1899, and a lumber company was available there. During the Great Depression of the 1930s, several Custer County farmers who had lost their homes relocated to vacant land and built sod houses there. As late as 1940, a sod house was built near Dunning, Nebraska.

The sod houses of Custer County are particularly well documented, owing to the efforts of Solomon Butcher. An itinerant photographer, Butcher conceived the idea of creating a photographic history of pioneer life in Nebraska. Between 1886 and 1912, he produced nearly 3,500 glass plate negatives; over 1,800 of these were taken in Custer County, and over 1,500 show sod houses. Butcher's photographs are now owned by the Nebraska State Historical Society.

=== Sod construction ===
In constructing a sod house, a site had to be chosen that was close to good sources of sod. All prairie grasses were not alike for purposes of construction sod; the best were those with a strong and dense root network to hold the blocks together. Preferred species included buffalo grass (Bouteloua dactyloides), slough grass (Spartina pectinata), and big bluestem (Andropogon gerardi).

At the house site, the grass was removed. Often, the soil was excavated one to two feet (30 to 60 cm) below ground level; this reduced the height of the walls, and thus the amount of sod that had to be cut. The ground that would form the house floor was moistened and then tamped with a fencepost to flatten and harden it. Footings were rarely laid, due to the cost or unavailability of material.

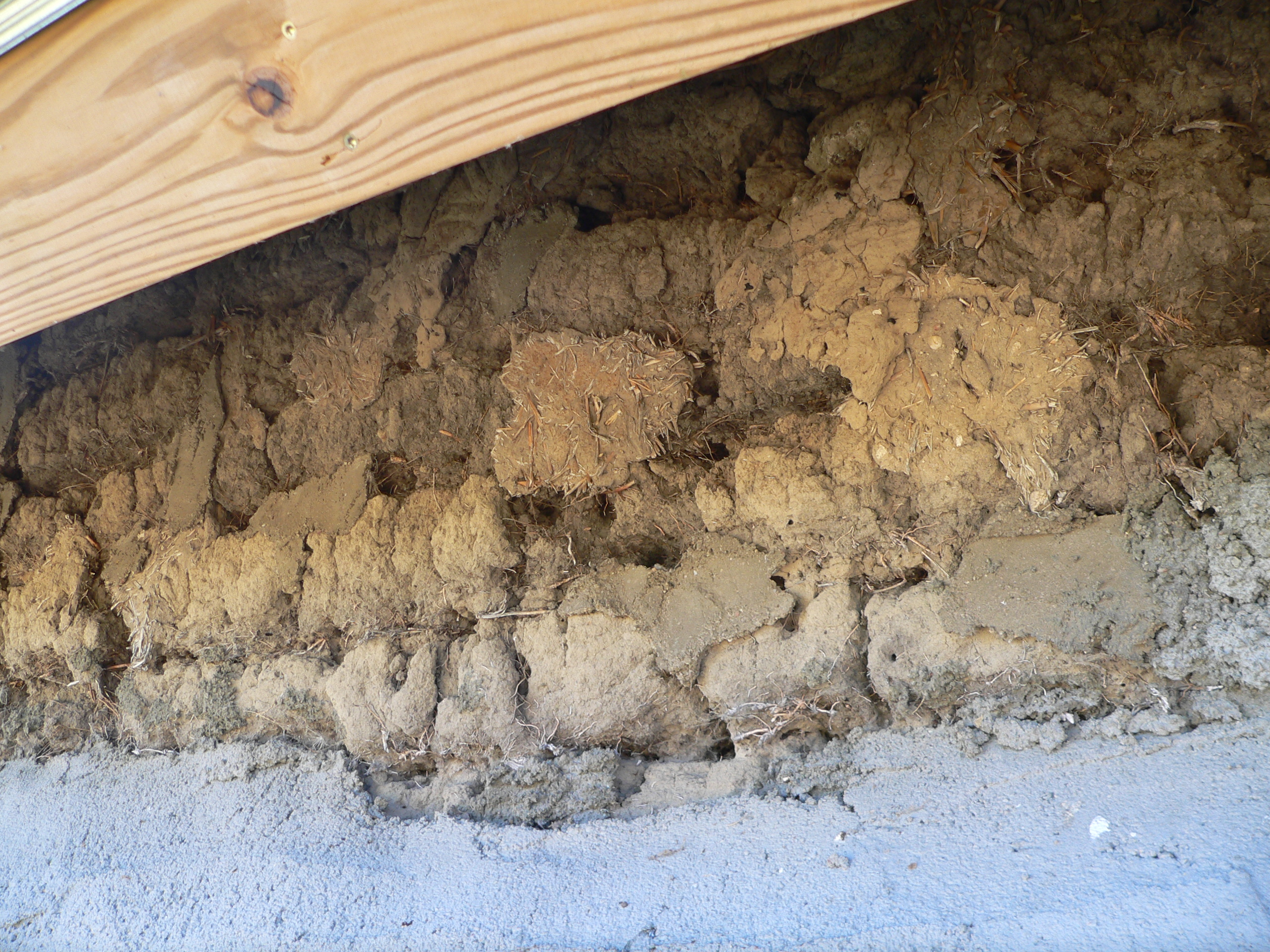
Sod blocks in upper portion of north wall of Dowse house.

Before the sod blocks were cut, the grass was mown short or burned off. At times, the surface was scored with a cutter or disc; the blocks could then be removed with a spade. This approach, however, tended to produce rough and non-uniform blocks, which complicated the task of laying them in even courses. Blocks could also be cut with a plow. An ordinary plow could be used, given considerable skill and care on the part of the operator; however, the mouldboard tended to turn over and break up the blocks; even if intact blocks were produced, they were generally not of uniform thickness. In the late 19th century, a modified plow designed specifically for sod cutting was invented: this "grasshopper plow" replaced the mouldboard with a set of adjustable rods, which allowed the operator to cut a uniform strip of sod three to six inches (7.6 to 15.2 cm) deep and 12 to 18 inches (30 to 46 cm) wide. This strip could then be cut into blocks. The dimensions of these depended, among other things, on the strength of the builder—the blocks were dense, and had to be sized so that the builders could lift them. Typical blocks cut with a grasshopper plow might measure four inches (10 cm) deep by 12 inches (30 cm) wide by 24 to 36 inches (60 to 90 cm) long.

In building the walls, the sod blocks were laid one course at a time; each course was completed before the next was begun. Walls were generally two or three wythes thick; the vertical joints were staggered to avoid creating a direct path through the wall for wind and vermin. To bind the wythes and increase the stability of the wall, every second, third, or fourth course was laid crosswise.

Early sod houses were roofed with sod. The weight of the roof helped to keep it from blowing away in strong winds, and the insulating power of such a roof helped to moderate temperatures within the house. However, the sod roof's weight also posed the risk of collapse if there was insufficient wood support for it, and sod roofs tended to drip water, mud, and insects. In later sod houses, for which the material was more readily available, roofs were shingled or covered with tarpaper, boards, or metal.

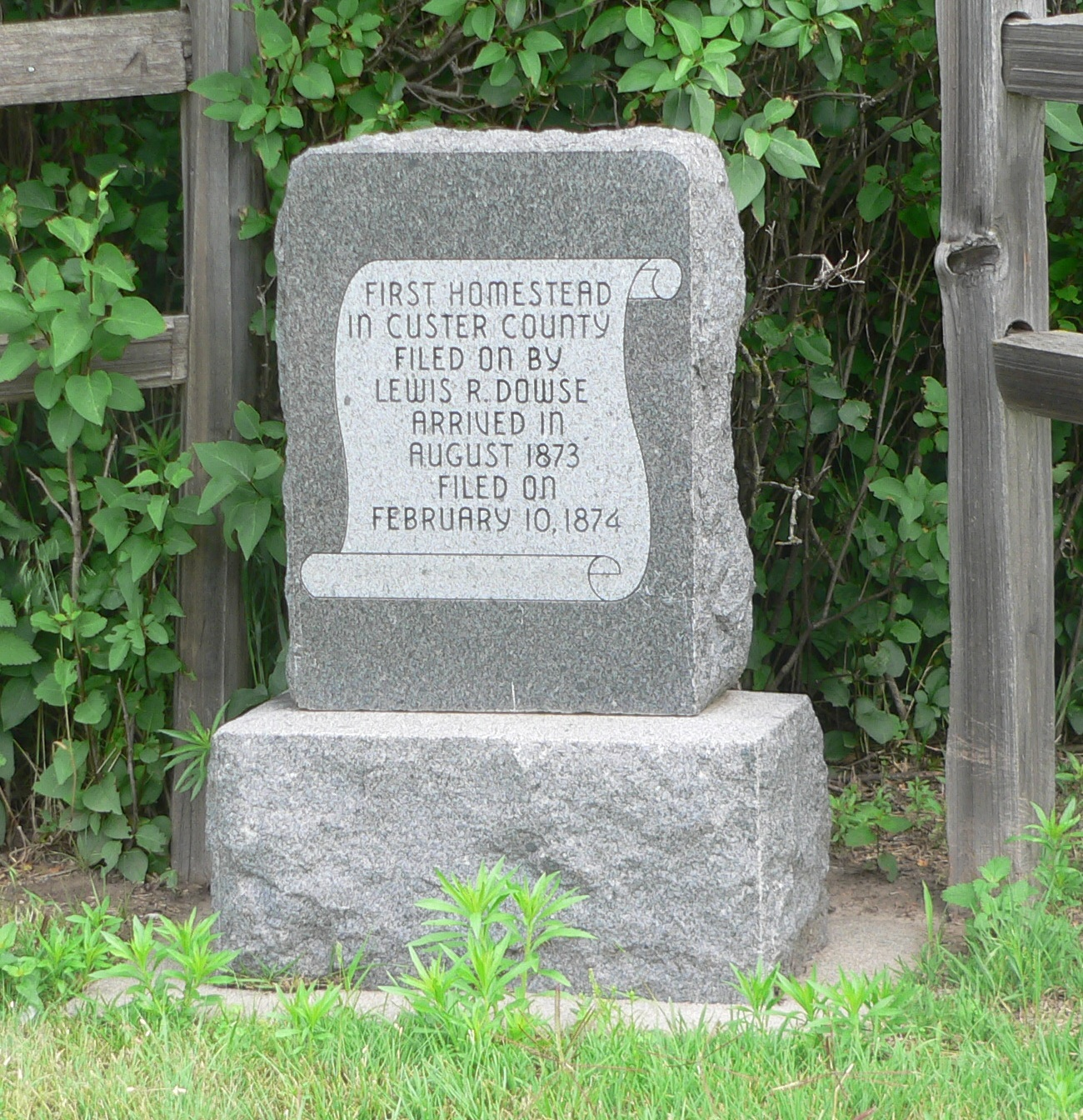
Monument at Lewis Dowse homestead site.

== History ==
The first homestead established in Custer County was that of Lewis R. and Sarah M. Dowse, who in August 1873 occupied a site on the Middle Loup River. Lewis Dowse was born in 1845 in Sherborn, Massachusetts. After service in the Civil War, he moved to Iowa in 1868. In the following year, he married Sarah Wagner, who was born in 1854 in Auglaize County, Ohio. In 1871, their oldest child, William R. Dowse, was born. The family moved to Nebraska in 1873, accompanied by Sarah Dowse's parents; the latter remained in Loup City while their daughter and son-in-law established their homestead, then moved to Custer County in 1874. The Dowses initially occupied a dugout on their claim; in 1874, they built a slab house, using material brought from Loup City. There, they raised nine children, including an adopted daughter.

=== Building the house ===
In October 1900, William Dowse married 18-year-old Florence Murphy, daughter of John and Leah Thrist Murphy. At the beginning of that year, he was living in a dugout just south of his parents’ farm; by April 1900, a sod house was under construction, to be occupied by the couple. John Murphy was an experienced builder of sod houses, and the William Dowse house was built with his aid and that of neighbors and friends.

The new house was located northwest of the homestead of the senior Dowses. William Dowse did not homestead the site. The property was originally acquired in 1884 by Kate Prescott, under the provisions of the Timber Culture Act of 1873; it is not known whether Prescott had built a dwelling on the parcel.

The blocks for the house were cut from bluestem sod, probably obtained from a site very close to the house. The grass was mown to a height of 1/4 inch (6 mm); the blocks were then cut with a grasshopper plow, to dimensions of about 24 inches (60 cm) long by 16 inches (40 cm) wide by 3–4 inches (8–10 cm) thick. Blocks were laid with the grass side down, in a one-course common bond; the walls were battered, measuring 27 inches (69 cm) thick at ground level and 20 inches (51 cm) thick at the top.

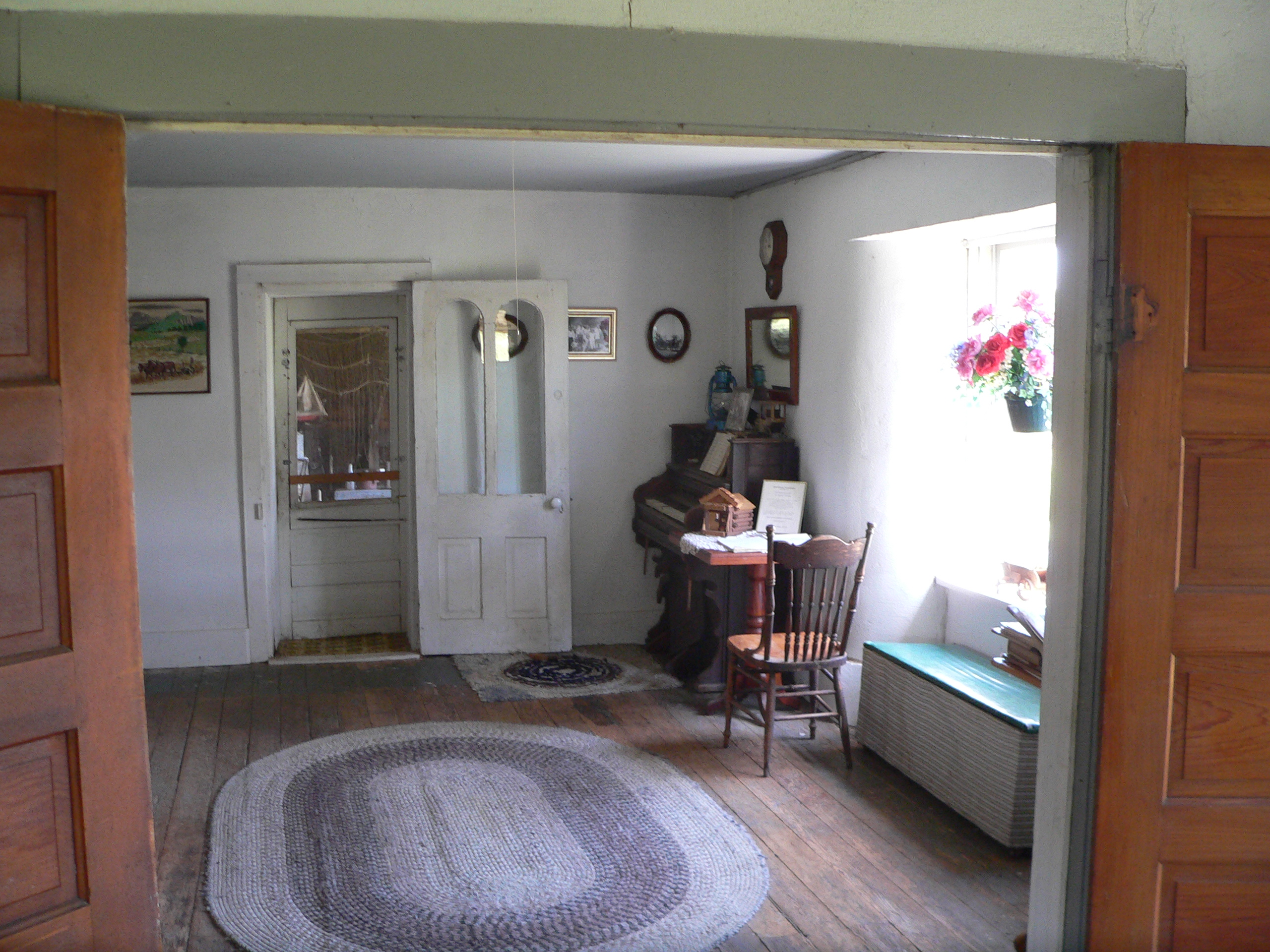
Restored parlor-dining room. The window at right faces south.

The plan of the house was L-shaped, with stems projecting to the east and to the south. It occupied a rectangle measuring 29 feet by 31 feet 3 inches (8.8 m by 9.5 m); each stem of the L was approximately 20 feet (6 m) wide. The single-story house was topped with a steeply pitched wood-shingled hip roof.

The interior was divided by wood partition walls into three rooms. A small bedroom occupied the northwest corner, at the angle of the L. The eastward projection contained a large kitchen and hall; the southward projection, a somewhat smaller parlor and dining room. A steep stairway led up to an unfinished attic. The floors were packed dirt; the ceiling was muslin tacked beneath boards. The interior of the sod walls was plastered with a mixture of clay, straw, and hog hair.

Two east-facing doors led into the house. One, at the end of the eastern projection of the L, led into the kitchen-hall. A second, on the east side of the southern projection, led from the space enclosed by the arms of the L into the parlor-dining room. Two windows faced northward: one from the kitchen-hall, one from the bedroom. Two more faced southward: one from the kitchen-hall and one from the parlor-dining room. A single window faced eastward from the kitchen-hall. Windows were flush with the exterior walls of the house. The window wells were beveled, widening toward the interior of the house; this admitted more light to the house. The configuration of the west wall is not known, since the wall was removed in 1924.

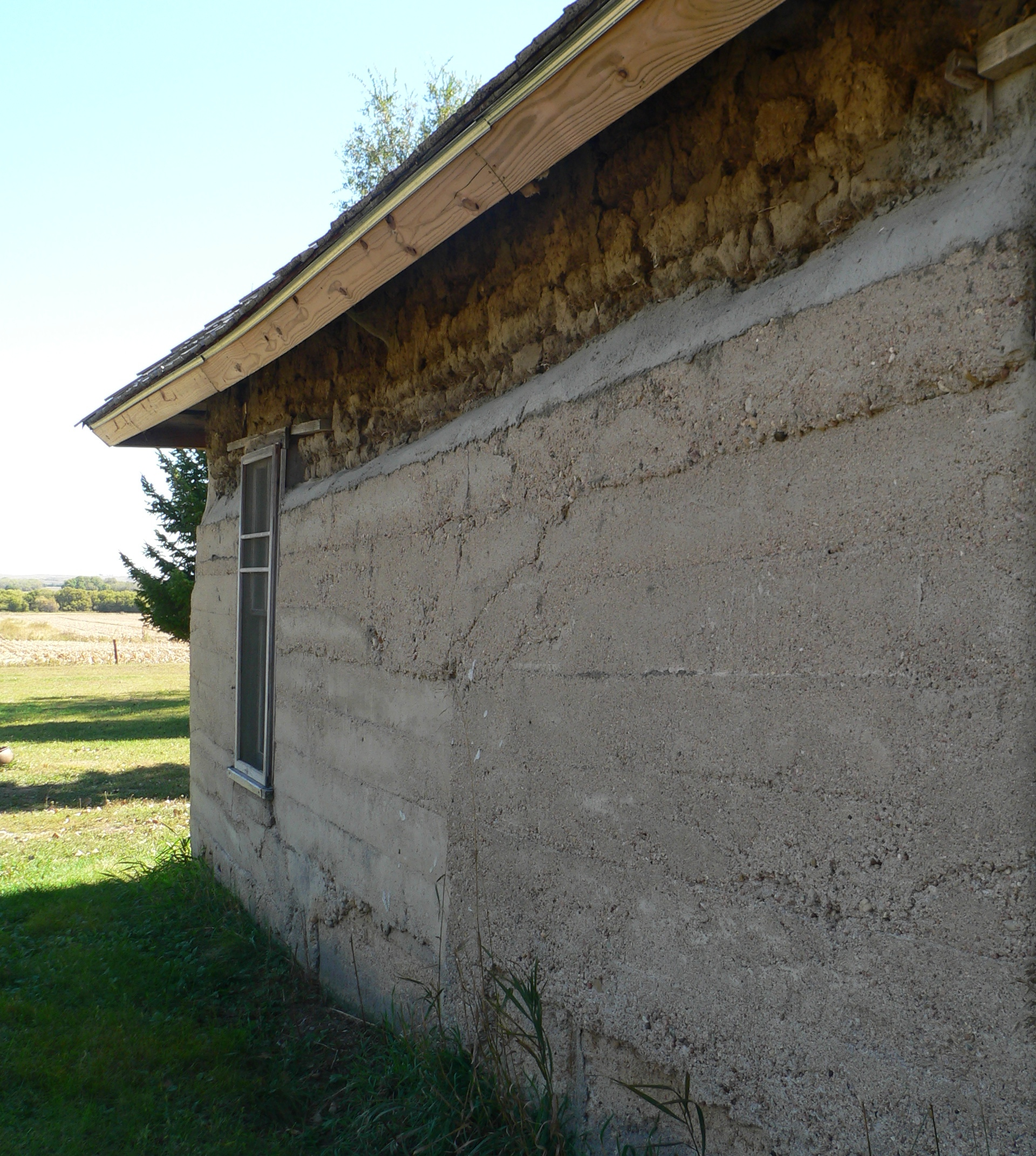
North wall of house, with concrete coating on lower portion and exposed sod blocks visible under eaves.

=== Living in the house ===
William and Florence Dowse raised five sons, born between 1905 and 1919: Harold, William Jr., Philip, Curtis, and Kermit. After occupying a crib in his parents' bedroom, each son moved up to the attic room, where they slept on straw ticks.

As the family expanded, the house was enlarged and improved. In 1915, the muslin ceiling was replaced with plaster. Two years later, wood tongue-and-groove flooring was installed. In 1924, two additions were made. The space between the two arms of the L was framed in and covered with a shed roof; the resulting southeast corner room was left unfinished and used as a laundry room. The west sod wall of the house was removed completely, and a second shed-roofed addition constructed to extend the house to the west. Both additions were clad in wooden shingles. William Dowse, Jr. and his wife Inez occupied the western addition.

At some point, the house was wired for electricity. Plumbing was never installed.

The last major alteration to the house took place in 1935, when it was realized that the projection of the eaves was not sufficient to protect the house's walls from erosion. At that time, concrete was applied to the lower portion of the exterior sod walls: boards were placed against the wall and concrete poured into the space between board and wall, then allowed to dry before the boards were raised and the process repeated.

The durability of the house was tested in the early 1940s, when a tornado struck the farmstead. All of the farm's outbuildings were destroyed; but the house escaped undamaged, apart from a sawhorse blown through one of the windows.

William Dowse lived in the house until his death in 1951. Florence Dowse remained for another two years before moving to Comstock; she died in 1969. The final occupants of the house were the family of William Dowse, Jr., who remained there until 1959, the year before his death.

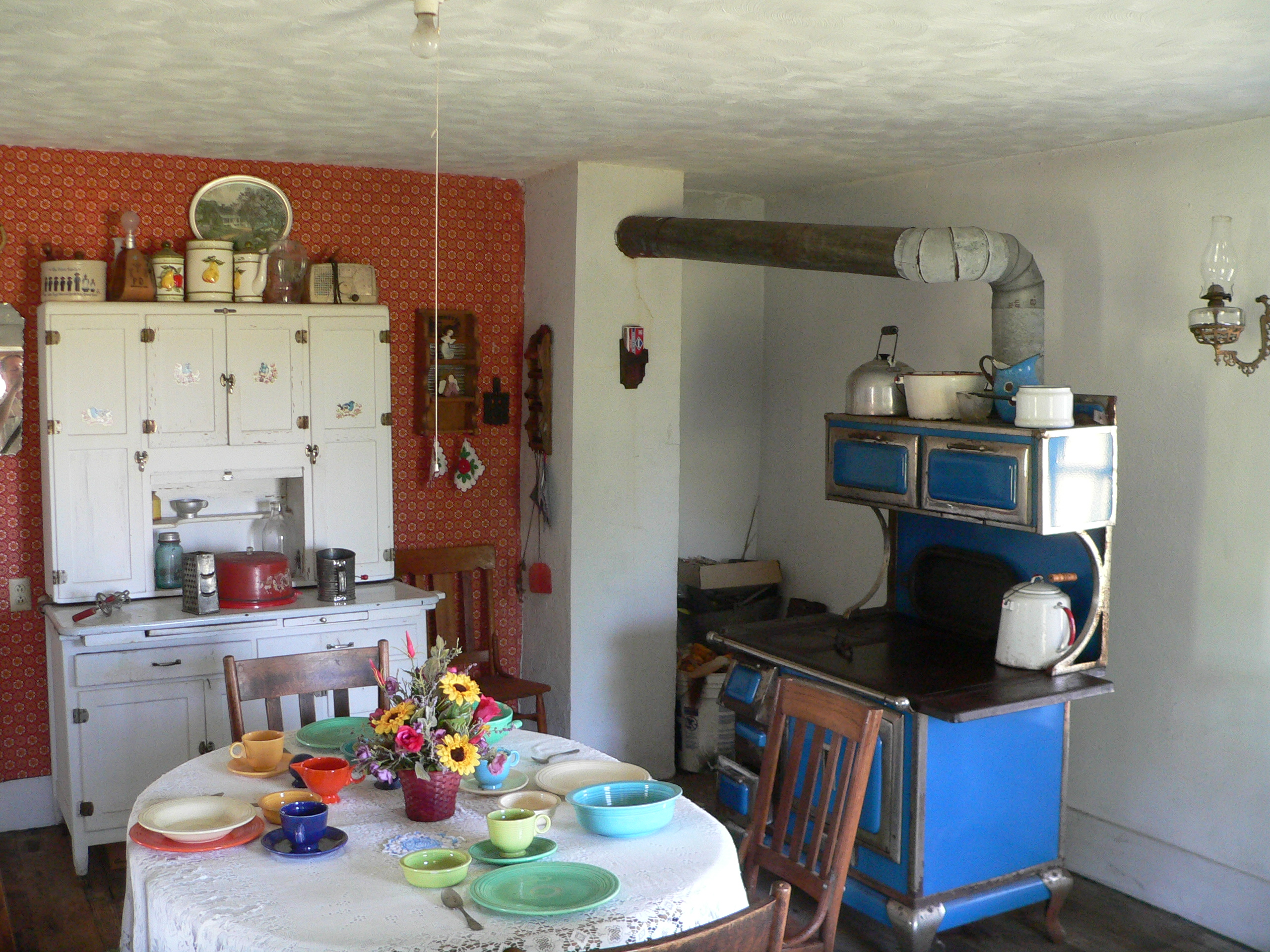
Restored kitchen. Camera is facing northwest.

=== Restoring the house ===
After the departure of the last occupants, the house stood neglected for over two decades. Fire damaged the roof and shingles were blown off, allowing leakage; all of the windows and doors were broken or destroyed. With nothing to bar their entrance, cattle passed through the house, leaving a foot (30 cm) of manure on the floors.

In about 1981, descendants of William and Florence Dowse decided to restore the house. The project was spearheaded by two of the Dowse sons, Philip and Curtis, and supported by the Comstock Community Club. In the course of several years, over $6,000 was raised for the project. A fence was built to exclude cattle from the house. The roof was repaired and reshingled. The exterior walls were reinforced and repaired with new sod blocks, cut with a horse-drawn plow about 600 feet (200 m) from the house; additional concrete coating was applied in places. The porch walls were re-shingled, and doors and windows were replaced. Inside the house, the manure covering the floors was removed, and the wood flooring repaired; the plaster on the walls was patched or replaced, up to 20 layers of old wallpaper was removed, and new wallpaper applied in places. Pioneer-era interior furnishings such as a cast-iron stove were installed. In May 1982, the house was opened as a museum.

In 1986, the house was listed in the National Register of Historic Places, under the name "William R. Dowse House". In the form nominating it for the register, it was described as "an excellent example of the sod house phenomenon", and as one of the few surviving sod houses in the state. For their efforts in restoring the house and opening it to the public, Philip and Curtis Dowse received the Nebraska State Historical Society's Nebraska Preservation Award in 1990. In the 21st century, the Dowse Sod House is promoted as a tourist destination by the village of Comstock and by the Nebraska Division of Travel and Tourism.
