= Wallace Notestein =

American historian

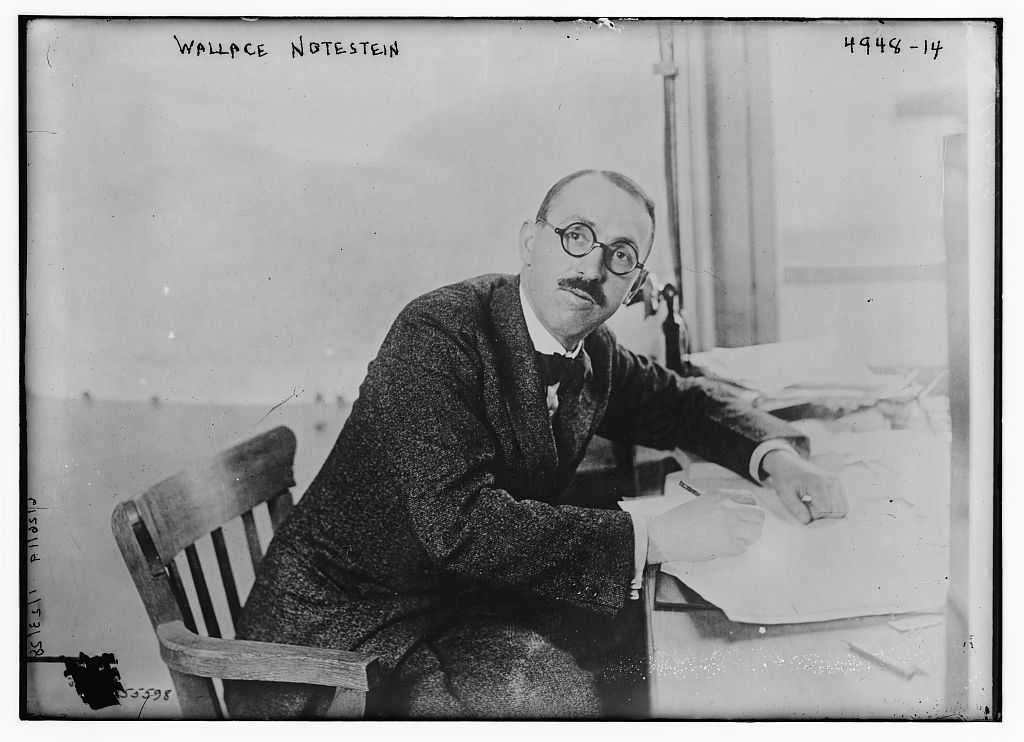
- Notestein in 1919
- Born: December 16, 1878; Wooster, Ohio, US
- Died: February 2, 1969 (aged 90); New Haven, Connecticut, US
- Spouse: Ada Comstock (m. 1943)

Academic background
- Education: BA, 1900, College of Wooster; MA, 1903, PhD, 1908, Yale University
- Thesis: A history of witchcraft in England from 1558 to 1718 (1908)

Academic work
- Institutions: Yale University; Cornell University; University of Minnesota; University of Kansas

Wallace Notestein (December 16, 1878 – February 2, 1969) was an American historian and Sterling Professor of English History at Yale University from 1928 to 1947. He was married to women's educational pioneer Ada Comstock.

He was a member of the American Commission to Negotiate Peace in Europe after World War I.

== Early life ==
Notestein was born on Monday, December 16, 1878, in Wooster, Ohio, to parents Jonas O. and Margaret (née Wallace) Notestein. He was born into an academic family. His father was professor of Latin Language and Literature at The College of Wooster. His uncles were professors and his younger sister Lucy Lilian Notestein became a historian. Notestein graduated with a Bachelor of Arts degree in 1900 from The College of Wooster. In 1903 and 1908 he received his Master of Arts degree and Ph.D., respectively, from Yale University.

== Career ==
Notestein joined the faculty of history at the University of Kansas from 1905 until 1907 when he left to teach at the University of Minnesota. During his lengthy tenure in Minnesota, he published his first book titled A History of Witchcraft in England from 1558 to 1718 through the American Historical Association. It was a chronological survey of Witchcraft in early modern Britain. In 1919, Notestein attended the Paris Peace Conference on World War I, serving as the American Commission to Negotiate Peace specialist on questions relating to Germany. Upon his return, he accepted the role of Professor of English History at Cornell University.

Notestein stayed at Cornell for eight years, during which he was appointed the Goldwin Smith Chair of English History, before leaving to become a Sterling Professor at his alma mater, Yale. During his first year at Yale, he was appointed by British Prime Minister Ramsay MacDonald to serve on a British commission investigating materials for a history of the personnel of the House of Commons of the United Kingdom. Notestein was elected to the American Philosophical Society in 1916. He was later honored by the University of Oxford in 1958 with an honorary Doctor of Letters degree. Notestein also received an honorary Doctor of Letters degree from Yale University in 1951.

Notestein died on Sunday, February 2, 1969, in New Haven, Connecticut from a heart attack.

== Personal life ==
Notestein married women's educational pioneer and former president of Radcliffe College, Ada Comstock in 1943.

== Works ==
- A History of Witchcraft in England from 1558 to 1718 (1911)
- Source Problems in English History (1915), co-authored with Albert Beebe White
- The Stuart Period: Unsolved Problems (1916), co-authored with Roland G. Usher
- Conquest and Kultur: Aims of the Germans in Their Own Words (1918), co-authored with Elmer E. Stoll
- Source Problem: The Growth of the Powers of Parliament (1921)
- Commons debates for 1629 (1921), co-edited with Frances Helen Relf
- The Journal of Sir Simonds D'Ewes: From the Beginning of the Long Parliament to the Opening of the Trial of the Earl of Strafford (1923)
- The Winning Initiative by the House of Commons (1924)
- The Winning of the Initiative by the House of Commons (1926)
- English Folk: A Book of Characters (1938)
- The Scot in History: A Study of the Interplay of Character and History (1946)
- The English People on the Eve of Colonization, 1603–1630 (1954)
- Four Worthies: John Chamberlain, Anne Clifford, John Taylor, Oliver Heywood (1957)
- The House of Commons, 1604–1610 (1971)
