= Randolph M. Probstfield =

American politician (1832–1911)

Randolph Michael Probstfield (November 9, 1832 – September 11, 1911) was one of the first Euro-American settlers in Clay County, Minnesota. He served in a variety of roles and was influential in the early development of the region.

Probstfield was born as Michael Probstfeld in Kalt, Landkreis Mayen-Koblenz, near Coblenz, Germany. His first cousin was the wildlife painter Joseph Wolf. He emigrated to the United States in 1852. For several years he traveled throughout the country as well as parts of Central America. He was also for some time a resident of Saint Paul, Minnesota. He eventually settled in the Red River Valley in 1859 in the fledgling community of Georgetown, Minnesota.

Probstfield returned to Germany in the fall of 1860 upon news of his father's death, but he came back to Georgetown in June 1861. Probstfield was an active citizen of Georgetown. He served as its postmaster from 1864 to 1869. and manager of a warehouse for the Hudson's Bay Company from 1865 to 1868

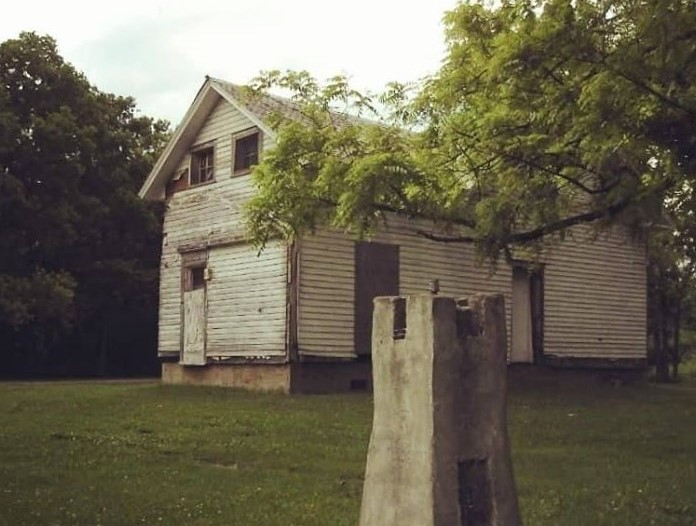
The Randolph M. Probstfield House

In 1869, Probstfield finished construction of a permanent home in Oakport Township, near Moorhead, Minnesota. Over time he grew his farm and his property. He was a prominent promoter of agriculture in the region, and he experimented farming different crop varieties for the United States Bureau of Agriculture. His home is now listed in the National Register of Historic Places.

In 1890, he was elected to a term in the Minnesota Senate, where he served from 1891 to 1894. During his tenure he served on the Agriculture Committee, the Banks Committee, the Game and Game Laws Committee, the Normal Schools committee, the State Public School Committee, and the Tree Culture and Fuel Committee, He was part of the Farmers' Alliance movement.

Probstfield also worked at one time or another as county clerk, public assessor and school board director.

Probstfield was also an active member of the local Odd Fellows lodge until his death.

Probstfield married his wife Catherine in 1861. They had thirteen children, eleven of which survived to adulthood.

Probstfield died in 1911 after suffering from multiple heart attacks. He was buried in Prairie Home Cemetery in Moorhead.
