= Richard Donovan (composer) =

American composer and organist (1891-1970)

Richard Frank Donovan (1891–1970) was an American composer and organist. He was the Battell Professor of Music Theory at Yale University from 1947 to 1960.

== Biography ==
Donovan was born on 29 November 1891 in New Haven, Connecticut. He studied at the Yale School of Music and the Institute of Musical Art, the latter of which he graduated from in 1922. He also studied under Charles-Marie Widor in Paris.

In 1923, Donovan's was employed as a teacher at Smith College. He also taught at the Institute of Musical Art for a period. He joined the faculty of Yale in 1928 and was Battell Professor of Music Theory from 1947 to 1960. He was also acting dean of the school of music between 1940 and 1941.

Donovan was conductor of the Bach Cantata Club in New Haven from 1933 to 1944 and associate conductor of the New Haven Symphony Orchestra from 1936 to 1951.

Donovan began as a post-Impressionist. His style, according to H. Wiley Hitchcock, "developed to a lucid polyphony, despite closely woven textures, with frequent use of modal themes, sometimes of folktunes." He composed for a wide range of vocal and instrumental arrangements, sometimes calling for unexpected combinations. His chamber piece Soundings, for example, made use of trumpet, bassoon, and percussion. Among the materials Donovan used in his work were the poetry of Carl Sandburg and Frances Fenton Bernard Park, Elizabethan lyrics, and American folk hymns.

Donovan won the BMI Publication Award in 1945 for his Design for Radio.

Donovan died on 22 August 1970 in Middletown, Connecticut. His paper are held by Yale University.

== Works ==
=== Orchestral ===
- Wood-notes (for flute, strings, harp; 1924–5)
- Smoke and Steel (symphonic poem after Carl Sandburg; 1932)
- Symphony (for chamber orchestra; 1936)
- Ricercare (for oboe and strings; 1938)
- Suite (for oboe and strings; 1944–5)
- Design for Radio (1945)
- New England Chronicle (1947)
- Passacaglia on Vermont Folk Tunes (1949 )
- Symphony (1956)
- Epos (1963)

=== Chamber ===
- Chamber sextet (for wind, piano; 1932)
- Piano suite (1932)
- Clarinet sonata (1937)
- Piano trio, in one movement (1937)
- Serenade (for oboe, strings trio; 1939)
- Terzetto (for 2 violins, viola, 1950)
- Soundings (bassoon, trumpet, percussion; 1953)
- Woodwind quarter (1953)
- Piano suite (1953)
- Music for six (for oboe, clarinet, string quartet; 1957)
- Fantasia (bassoon; 1960, revised 1961)
- Piano trio (1963)

=== Choral ===
- How far is it to Bethlehem? (female voices, organ; 1927)
- Chanson of the Bells of Oseney (female voices, piano; 1930)
- To all you ladies now at hand (male voices, pian/orchestra; 1932)
- Fantasy on American Folk Ballads (male voices, piano/orchestra; 1940)
- Hymn to the Night (female voices; 1947)
- 4 Songs of Nature (female voices, 1953;
- Mass (unison voices, organ, 3 trumpets, timpani; 1955)
- Magnificat (male voices, organ; 1961)
