= Frances Fenton Bernard Park =

American college dean

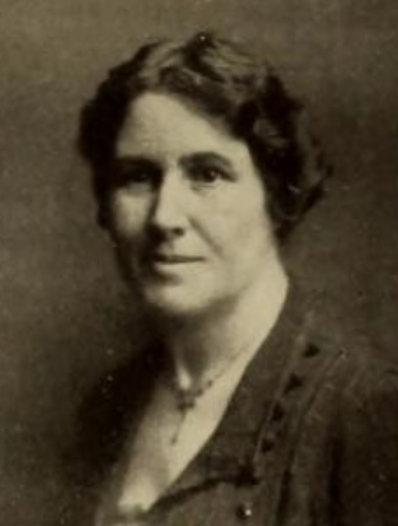
- Frances Fenton Bernard, from the 1925 yearbook of Smith College
- Born: Frances Fenton; December 4, 1880; Washington, D.C.
- Died: July 21, 1953 (age 72); Boston, Massachusetts
- Other names: Frances Fenton Bernard, Frances Fenton Park
- Occupations: College dean, professor, psychoanalyst
- Spouse(s): Luther L. Bernard; Edwin Avery Park

Frances Fenton Bernard Park (December 4, 1880 – July 21, 1953) was an American college professor and dean. She succeeded Ada Louise Comstock as dean of Smith College, an office she held from 1924 to 1928.

== Early life and education ==
Fenton was born in Washington, D.C., the daughter of Ernest A. Fenton and Mary S. Welsh Fenton. She graduated from Vassar College in 1902, and served as a trustee of the Vassar Alumnae Association. She earned her Ph.D. in sociology from the University of Chicago in 1910.

== Career ==
Bernard taught at a normal school in Minnesota, and at Mount Holyoke College, as a young woman. She became an assistant professor of economics at Wellesley College in 1920. She was educational secretary of the American Association of University Women (AAUW) from 1922 to 1924. She succeeded Ada Louise Comstock as dean of Smith College in 1924. In 1932, she was secretary of the Sixth World Conference of the New Education Fellowship, held in France.

Later in life, Park was assistant to the president of Bennington College in 1940, in charge of public relations and fundraising. As the college president's assistant, she accompanied him to Washington, D.C. to meet President Franklin D. Roosevelt on matters related to World War II in 1940. She taught at the William Alanson White Institute from 1947 to 1951, and became a psychoanalyst in her later years.

== Publications ==
In addition to her own work, Bernard wrote more than two dozen book reviews for the American Journal of Sociology, between 1912 and 1917. She also wrote reviews for the journal Social Forces in the 1920s. In 1946, she wrote the entry on Belva Ann Lockwood for the Dictionary of American Biography.

- "The Tenure of Office of Trustees" (1922)
- "The Educational Program of the American Association of University Women" (1924)

== Personal life and legacy ==
Fenton married fellow sociologist Luther Lee Bernard. They had a daughter, and divorced in 1922. She married again in 1928, to Edwin Avery Park, a Yale University professor about ten years her junior. She died in 1953, at the age of 72, in Boston. After her death, some of her poetry was set to music by Yale professor and composer Richard Frank Donovan.
