= Viaero Wireless =

American telecommunications company

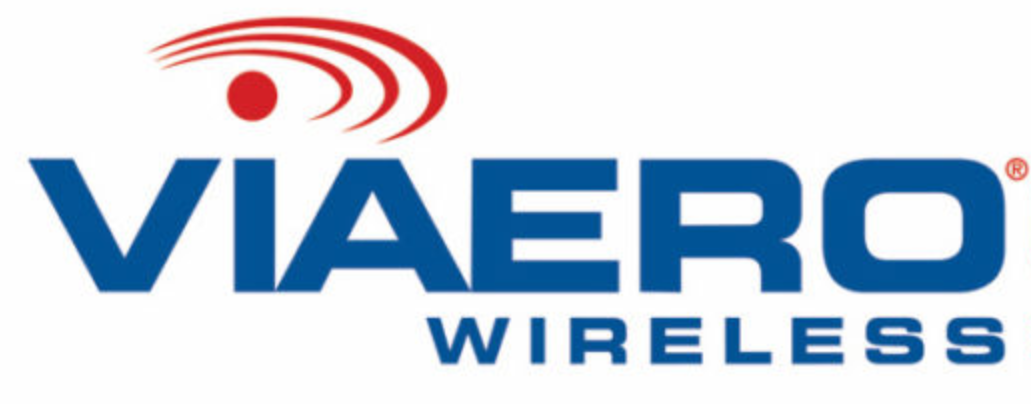
- Type: Private
- Industry: Wireless Services
- Founded: 1991
- Headquarters: Fort Morgan, Colorado, United States
- Products: GSM, EDGE, UMTS, and LTE (wireless voice and data services), SMS (text messaging), MMS (picture messaging), business VoIP, line-of-sight wireless and fiber internet (in select locations)
- Website: viaero.com

Viaero Wireless is a regional wireless telecommunications company that provides direct coverage in Nebraska, eastern Colorado, western Kansas, and southeastern Wyoming. Based in Fort Morgan, Colorado, Viaero is often the primary cell tower owner in portions of its coverage area. Through roaming coverage partner relationships (notably with AT&T), Viaero customers can place and receive calls locally and across the country, internationally, and on cruise ships.

== History ==
Founded in 1991 as Cellular One of Northeast Colorado, Frank DiRico opened his first store in Fort Morgan. Expanding with a second store in Sterling in 1995, the company would take the name NE Colorado Cellular, Inc. The brand Viaero Wireless was formed in August 2003 when DiRico's company merged with Wireless II (doing business as Nebraska Wireless).

Nebraska state regional headquarters were built in Grand Island, Nebraska in 2007.

== Network ==
In 2008, Viaero made the decision to maintain its analog services to support customers who were still using older handset equipment, even though most of its customers had migrated to use Viaero's state-of-the-art digital GSM network. By 2013, the company had invested over $70 million in upgrades to its 4G operating systems.

In order to maintain spectrum capacity, in 2020, Viaero bid over $15 million for 558 licenses in the 3.5 GHz Auction 105 held by the FCC, and in 2022 the company paid over $6 million for eighteen 3.45 GHz licenses in Auction 110.

While in 2009 the company had 41 retail stores and 384 cell towers in operation, the company continued to grow to have around 70 stores and about 1,000 cell towers.

Viaero's 4G network was outfitted with Huawei equipment which later was subject to new FCC and state of Nebraska security-motivated regulations for U.S. carriers using Chinese-made equipment. In September 2021, Viaero selected Ericsson to replace the Chinese equipment with 5G-ready hardware. An Omaha-based Public Service Commission representative noted that Viaero discussed up to $330 million of a $1.9 billion federal funds package that could be applied for, to aid in the replacement process.

== Community and Sponsorships ==
Viaero positions itself as a community-oriented company. For example, in 2025 the company ran a 20th anniversary community-appreciation party in Sidney, Nebraska, and it shares weather camera feeds from its cell towers with Nebraska Television Network, to help monitor storms and advance safety.

Viaero began sponsoring events like the Comstock Music Festivals in 2007, and it inked a $1 million, 5-year deal with the Tri-City Storm hockey team, the first of its kind with the United States Hockey League.

The 5,000-seat multi-purpose Viaero Center in Kearney, Nebraska bears the company's name.

An unlimited music service called VGroov was in place in 2013 for Android users.
