= Solomon Comstock =

American politician

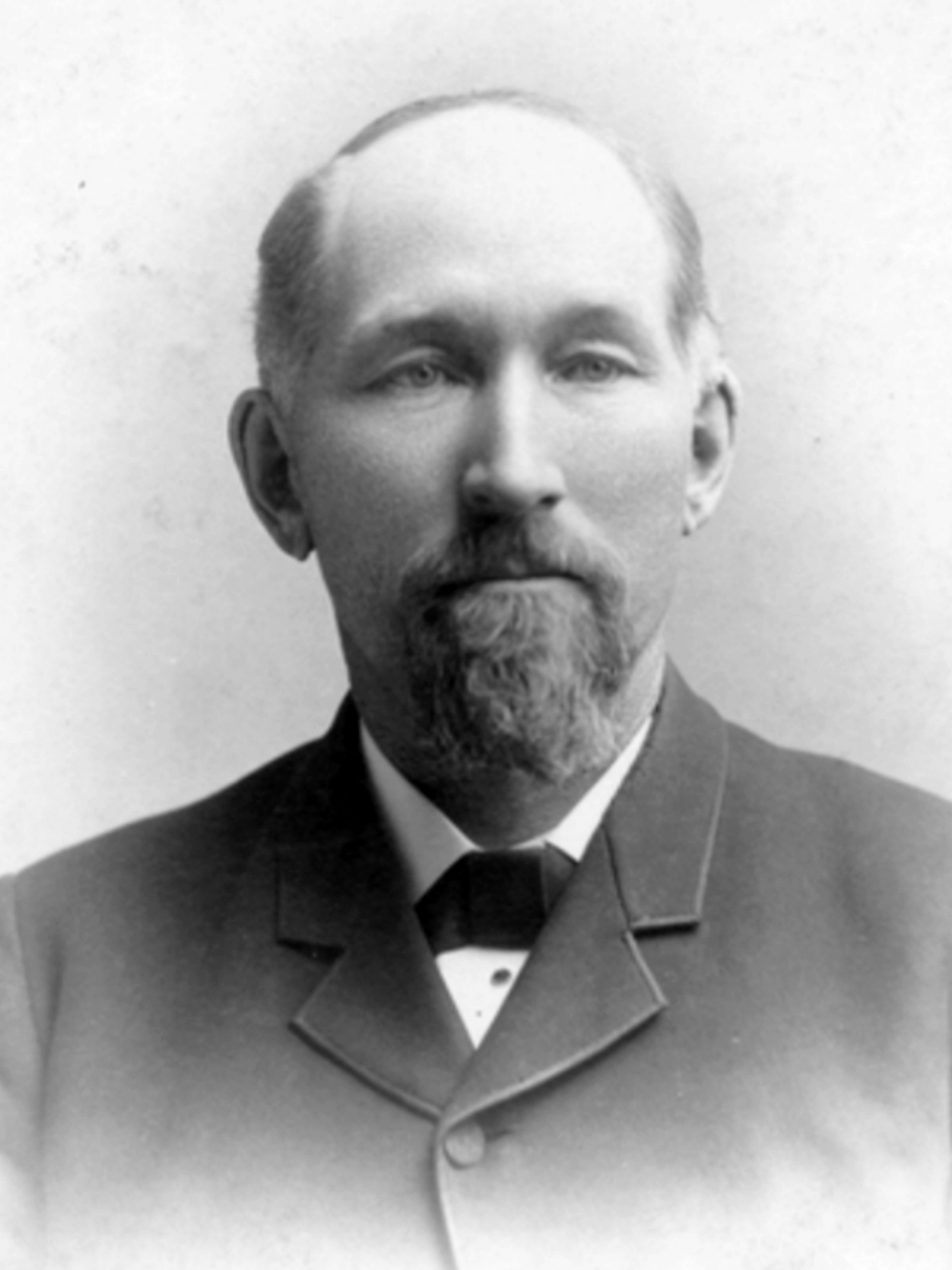
- Comstock in 1890

Member of the U.S. House of Representatives from Minnesota's 5th district
- In office March 4, 1889 – March 3, 1891
- Preceded by: Knute Nelson
- Succeeded by: Kittel Halvorson

Member of the Minnesota Senate
- In office 1882–1888

Personal details
- Born: Solomon Gilman Comstock; May 9, 1842 Argyle, Maine, U.S.
- Died: June 3, 1933 (aged 91) Moorhead, Minnesota, U.S.
- Party: Republican
- Education: University of Michigan

Solomon Gilman Comstock (May 9, 1842 – June 3, 1933) was an American attorney and politician who served as a member of the United States House of Representatives for Minnesota's 5th congressional district from 1889 to 1891.

== Early life and education ==
Born in Argyle, Maine, Comstock moved to Passadumkeag, Maine, with his parents in 1845. He attended rural schools, East Corinth (Maine) Academy, Maine Wesleyan Seminary at Kents Hill, and Hampden Academy. Comstock studied law in Bangor, Maine under the Honorable Samuel F. Humphrey. In 1868, he continued his studies at the University of Michigan at Ann Arbor.

== Career ==
He moved to Nebraska in 1869 and settled in Omaha, where he was admitted to the bar the same year and commenced practice. He moved to Minneapolis, Minnesota, in 1870 and to Moorhead, Minnesota, in 1871, where he became a railroad construction laborer. When Clay County government was established in April 1872 in response to the killing of Slim Jim Shumway by Shang Stanton, Comstock was the only man in town with a law degree. Consequently Comstock was Clay County attorney from 1872 to 1878.

He was elected a member of the Minnesota House of Representatives in 1875, 1876, 1878, and 1881. He served in the Minnesota Senate from 1882 to 1888. Comstock was an unsuccessful candidate for attorney general of Minnesota in 1882 and as lieutenant governor in 1884. He retired from law practice in 1884 and engaged in the real estate business. Comstock was elected as a Republican to the United States House of Representatives in the 51st United States Congress, (March 4, 1889 – March 3, 1891). He was unsuccessful candidate for reelection in 1890 to the 52nd Congress and served as a delegate to the 1892 Republican National Convention.

Comstock donated land to build the Bishop Whipple School in 1882, which later became Concordia College. He also sponsored a bill and donated six acres of land in 1885 to help create the Moorhead Normal School, now Minnesota State University Moorhead.

After resuming his real estate business in Moorhead, Comstock also engaged in manufacturing farm implements in 1893. He was a member of the state normal school board from 1897 to 1905, and retired from business pursuits and resided in Moorhead, Minnesota, until his death on June 3, 1933. He was buried at Prairie Home Cemetery in Moorhead, Minnesota.

== Personal life ==
Solomon Comstock married Sarah Ann Ball on May 27, 1874 in Fargo, North Dakota. The couple had three children: Ada Louise Comstock Notestein (1876–1973), Jessie May Comstock (1879–1951), and George Madison Comstock (1886–1966).

He is the namesake of Comstock, Minnesota, as well as Comstock Township, Marshall County, Minnesota. His residence, the Historic Solomon G. Comstock House in Moorhead, operates as a historic house museum.
