= Investigative Biology Teaching Laboratories at Cornell University =

The Investigative Biology Teaching Laboratories are located at Cornell University on the first floor Comstock Hall. They are well-equipped biology teaching laboratories used to provide hands-on laboratory experience to Cornell undergraduate students. Currently, they are the home of the Investigative Biology Laboratory Course, (BioG1500), and frequently being used by the Cornell Institute for Biology Teachers, the Disturbance Ecology course and Insectapalooza. In the past the Investigative Biology Teaching Laboratories hosted the laboratory portion of the Introductory Biology Course with the course number of Bio103-104 (renumbered to BioG1103-1104).

The Investigative Biology Teaching Laboratories house the Science Communication and Public Engagement Undergraduate Minor.

== History ==
Bio103-104

BioG1103-1104 Biological Sciences Laboratory course was a two-semester, two-credit course. BioG1103 was offered in the spring, while 1104 was offered in the fall.

BioG1500

This course was first offered in Fall 2010. It is a one semester course, offered in the Fall, Spring and Summer for 2 credits. One credit is being awarded for the letter and one credit for the three-hour-long lab, following the SUNY system.
