= Comstock, Nebraska =

Village in Custer County, Nebraska, United States

- Village
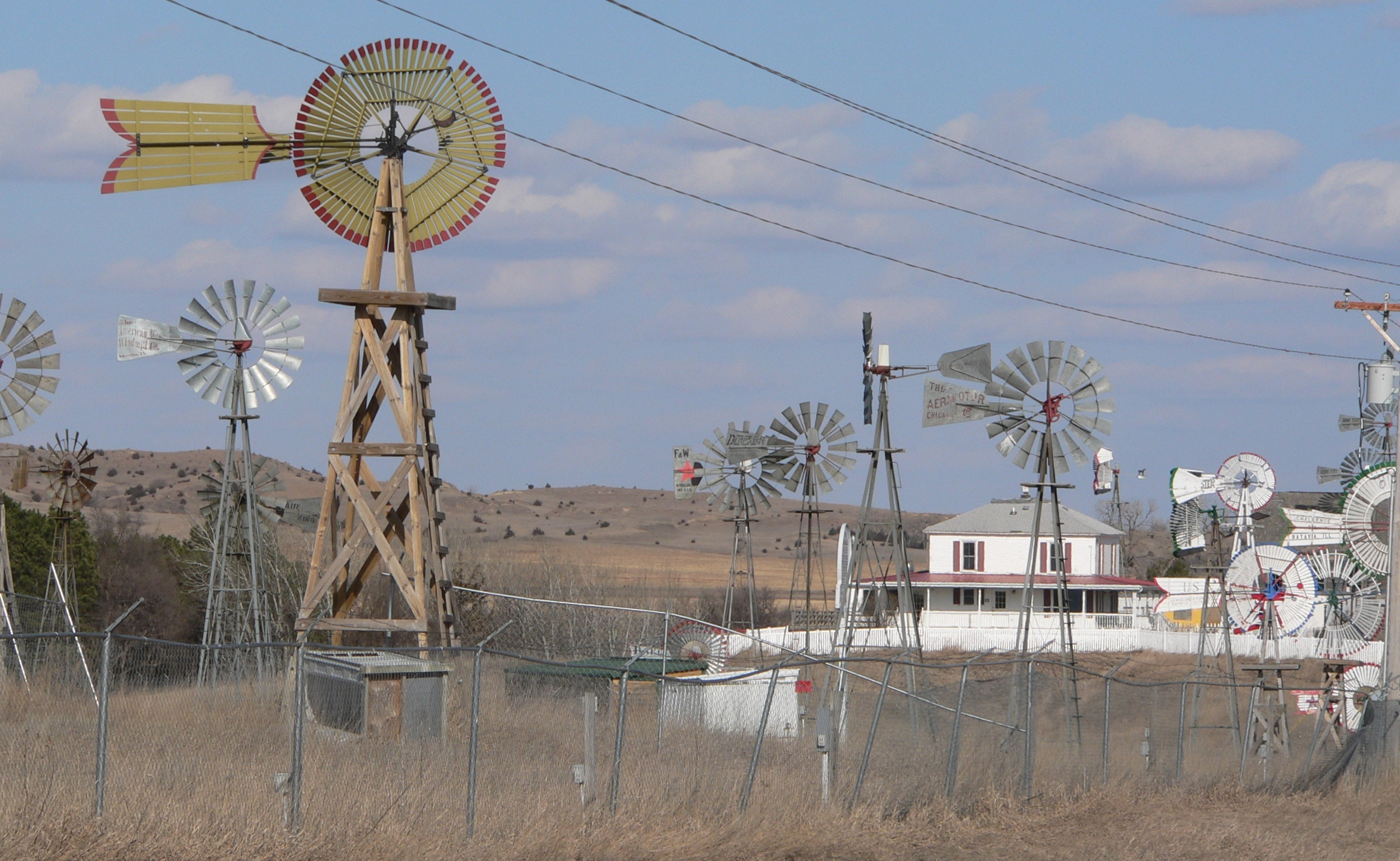
- Second Wind Ranch north of Comstock; site of the Comstock Music Festivals
- Motto: "Little Town. Big Heart"
- Location of Comstock, Nebraska

- Location within Nebraska Location within the United States
- Coordinates: 41°33′36″N 99°15′03″W
- Country: United States
- State: Nebraska
- County: Custer
- Township: Comstock
- Date Established: 1899

Government
  - Village Clerk: Candace Kirwan

Area
  - Total: 0.35 sq mi (0.91 km^{2})
  - Land: 0.35 sq mi (0.91 km^{2})
  - Water: 0 sq mi (0.00 km^{2})
- Elevation: 2,244 ft (684 m)

Population (2020)
  - Total: 68
  - Density: 194.0/sq mi (74.89/km^{2})
- Time zone: UTC-6 (Central (CST))
  - Summer (DST): UTC-5 (CDT)
- ZIP code: 68828
- Area code: 308
- FIPS code: 31-10180
- GNIS feature ID: 2398610
- Website: comstock-ne.com

Comstock is a village in Custer County, Nebraska, United States. As of the 2020 census, Comstock had a population of 68.

== History ==
Comstock was established in 1899 as a water stop on a new railroad line. It was named for W. H. Comstock, a storekeeper.

== Geography ==
According to the United States Census Bureau, the village has a total area of 0.35 square miles (0.91 km^{2}), all land.

== Demographics ==
Historical population
Census	Pop.	Note	%±
1910	323		—
1920	450		39.3%
1930	450		0.0%
1940	408		−9.3%
1950	302		−26.0%
1960	235		−22.2%
1970	155		−34.0%
1980	168		8.4%
1990	135		−19.6%
2000	110		−18.5%
2010	93		−15.5%
2020	68		−26.9%
U.S. Decennial Census

=== 2010 census ===
As of the census of 2010, there were 93 people, 44 households, and 26 families living in the village. The population density was 265.7 inhabitants per square mile (102.6/km^{2}). There were 83 housing units at an average density of 237.1 per square mile (91.5/km^{2}). The racial makeup of the village was 97.8% White, 1.1% from other races, and 1.1% from two or more races. Hispanic or Latino of any race were 1.1% of the population.

There were 44 households, of which 22.7% had children under the age of 18 living with them, 43.2% were married couples living together, 9.1% had a female householder with no husband present, 6.8% had a male householder with no wife present, and 40.9% were non-families. 38.6% of all households were made up of individuals, and 25% had someone living alone who was 65 years of age or older. The average household size was 2.11 and the average family size was 2.77.

The median age in the village was 49.7 years. 23.7% of residents were under the age of 18; 0.0% were between the ages of 18 and 24; 19.4% were from 25 to 44; 33.3% were from 45 to 64; and 23.7% were 65 years of age or older. The gender makeup of the village was 49.5% male and 50.5% female.

=== 2000 census ===
As of the census of 2000, there were 110 people, 62 households, and 29 families living in the village. The population density was 316.1 inhabitants per square mile (122.0/km^{2}). There were 92 housing units at an average density of 264.4 per square mile (102.1/km^{2}). The racial makeup of the village was 98.18% White, and 1.82% from two or more races. Hispanic or Latino of any race were 4.55% of the population.

There were 62 households, out of which 16.1% had children under the age of 18 living with them, 35.5% were married couples living together, 6.5% had a female householder with no husband present, and 53.2% were non-families. 48.4% of all households were made up of individuals, and 33.9% had someone living alone who was 65 years of age or older. The average household size was 1.77 and the average family size was 2.48.

16.4% of the population is under the age of 18, 3.6% from 18 to 24, 14.5% from 25 to 44, 28.2% from 45 to 64, and 37.3% who were 65 years of age or older. The median age was 58 years. For every 100 females, there were 83.3 males. For every 100 females age 18 and over, there were 80.4 males.

As of 2000 the median income for a household in the village was $25,833, and the median income for a family was $32,500. Males had a median income of $20,833 versus $22,000 for females. The per capita income for the village was $13,955. There were 7.5% of families and 13.3% of the population living below the poverty line, including 20.0% of under eighteens and 13.8% of those over 64.

== Culture ==
The village contains a recreational park, garden and an active church. The historic Dowse Sod House lies southwest of Comstock.

The annual Comstock Music Festivals were held from 2000 to 2008 at the 2nd Wind Ranch north of Comstock. The event garnered popular music artists and national attention, and at its peak attracted over 50,000 attendees over the four-day concert event. Financial pressures and a change of ownership indefinitely ended the concert series in 2008.

== See also ==
- List of municipalities in Nebraska
