= John Olness House =

Historic house in Minnesota, United States

- U.S. National Register of Historic Places
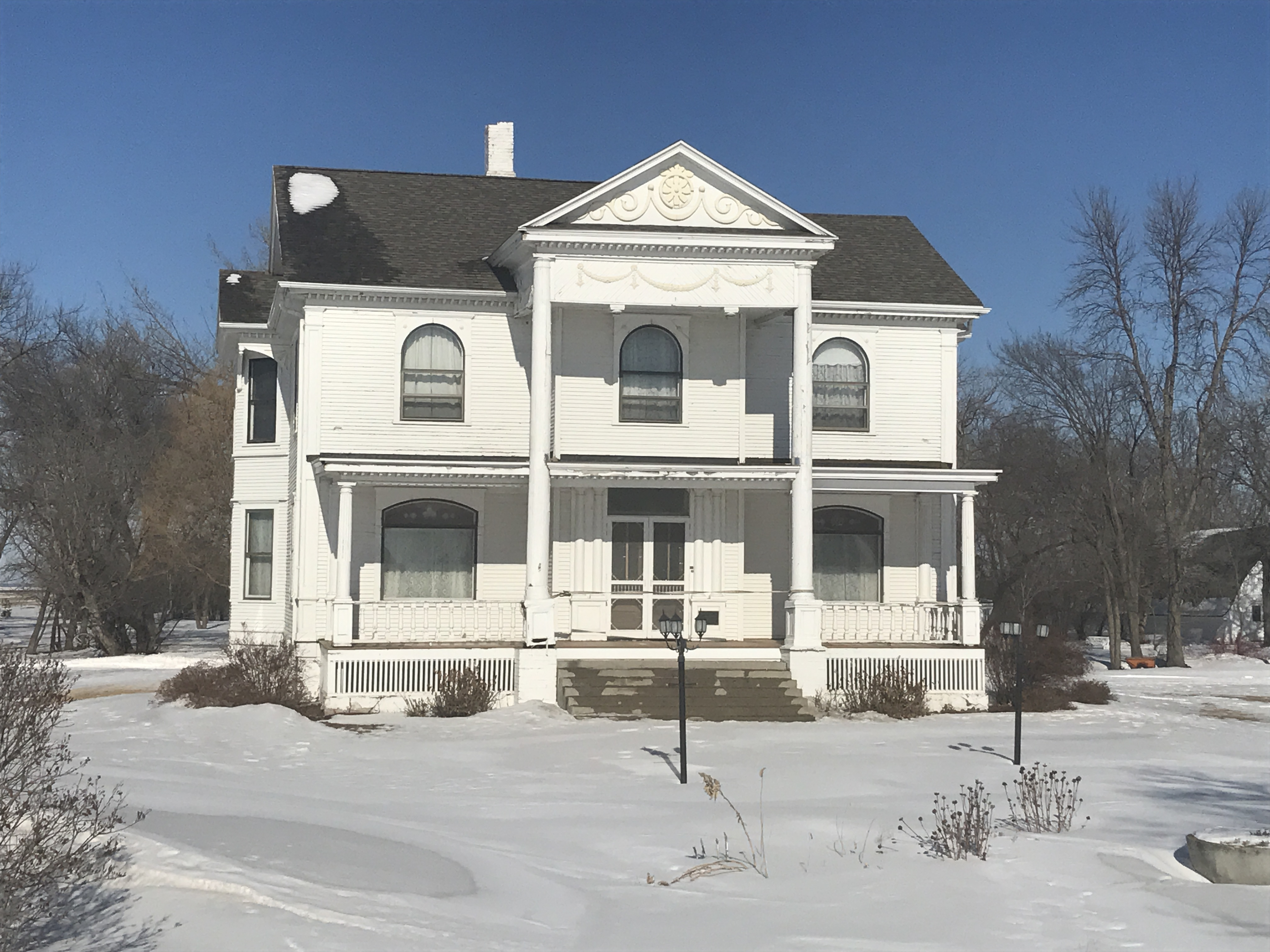

- Location within Minnesota Location within the United States
- Nearest city: Georgetown, Minnesota
- Coordinates: 46°59′31″N 96°45′8″W
- Built: 1902
- Architect: Brattenborg
- Architectural style: Classical Revival, Queen Anne
- MPS: Clay County MRA
- NRHP reference No.: 80002018
- Added to NRHP: May 07, 1980

The John Olness House is a house in Kragnes Township, Clay County, Minnesota, just north of Moorhead on U.S. Route 75. The house is listed on the National Register of Historic Places as an example of a link between the farm communities and the farm-related businesses in Clay County. The architecture shows influences of the Queen Anne style, which stands out in Clay County because most buildings were in the local vernacular style. The owner, John Olness, was a successful farmer, and he also owned several businesses in the nearby community of Kragnes, including the local grain elevator and lumber yard.

The house received media attention during the 2009 Red River Flood. On March 24, 2009, owner Jeremy Kuipers discovered that the floodwaters had overcome a dike along a county road and surrounded the house. Dozens of volunteers filled sandbags and built a dike around the house. The floodwaters are expected to threaten the house for the next two weeks before subsiding.
