= Comstock Hall (Ithaca, New York) =

Building on Cornell University campus in Ithaca, New York, United States

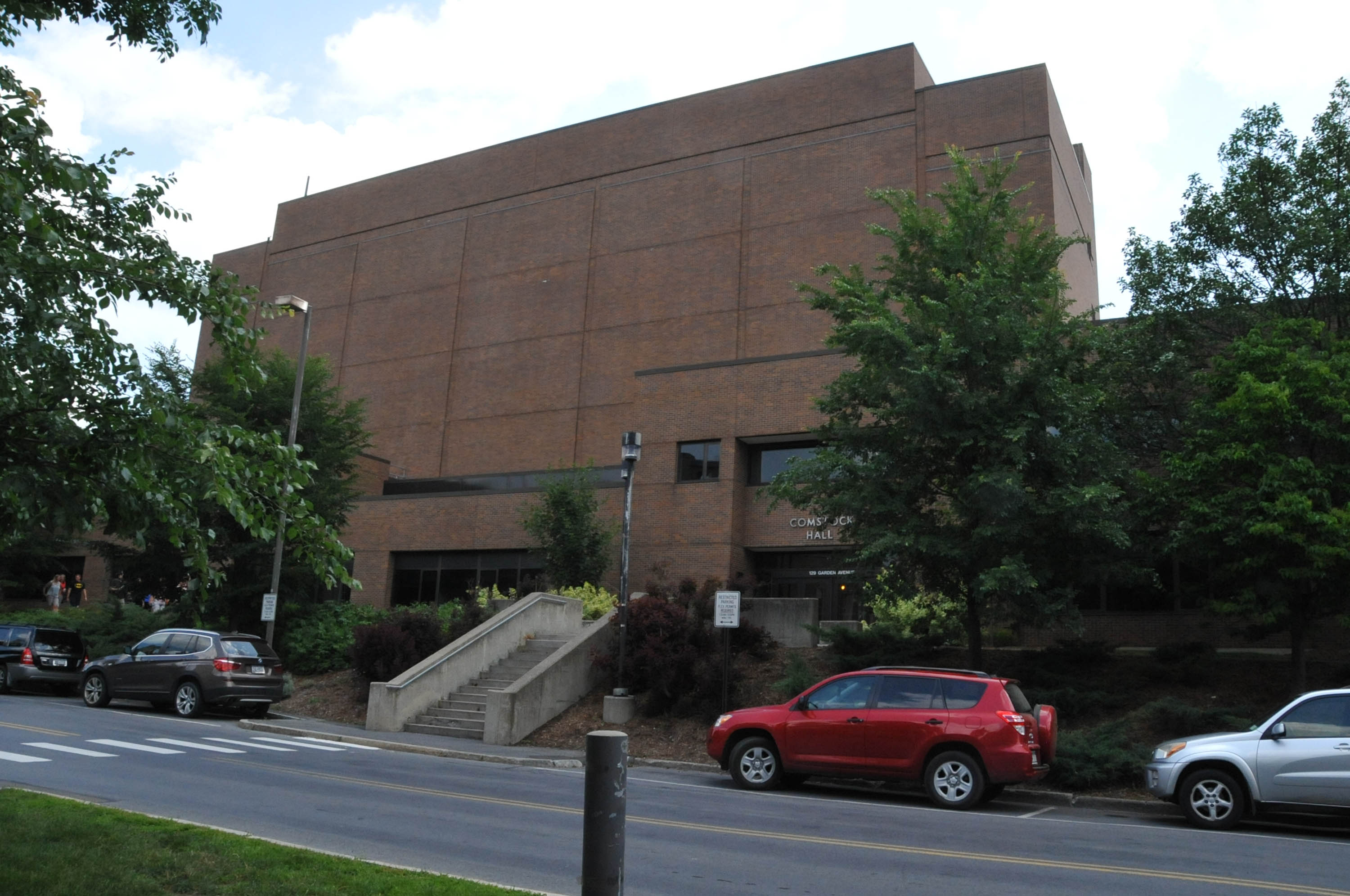
The new Comstock Hall

Comstock Hall is a building of Cornell University, located in Ithaca, in the U.S. state of New York. It was built in 1985 in the modern style.

The "old" Comstock Hall was built by New York State for the Entomology Department, but in the 1980s, it was sold to Cornell so that mainframe computers could be relocated from Langmuir Laboratory. As a result, a new, state-funded Entomology Department building was named Comstock Hall in 1985, and the historic building has been renamed the Computing and Communications Center. The building was named in honor of John Henry Comstock.

== Departments ==
Comstock Hall hosts several departments. On the first floor the Investigative Biology Teaching Laboratories provide hands-on biology education to undergraduates. The first floor also hosts some of the faculty and administrative staff for Cornell's Department of Statistics and Data Science. The Department of Entomology is hosted on floors 2–6 with a rich insect collection on the second floor.

A reference to Comstock Hall was made in TV show The Office between Andy Bernard and Dwight Schrute.
