= Comstock House =

Historic house in Minnesota, United States

- Solomon Gilman Comstock House
- U.S. National Register of Historic Places
- Minnesota State Register of Historic Places
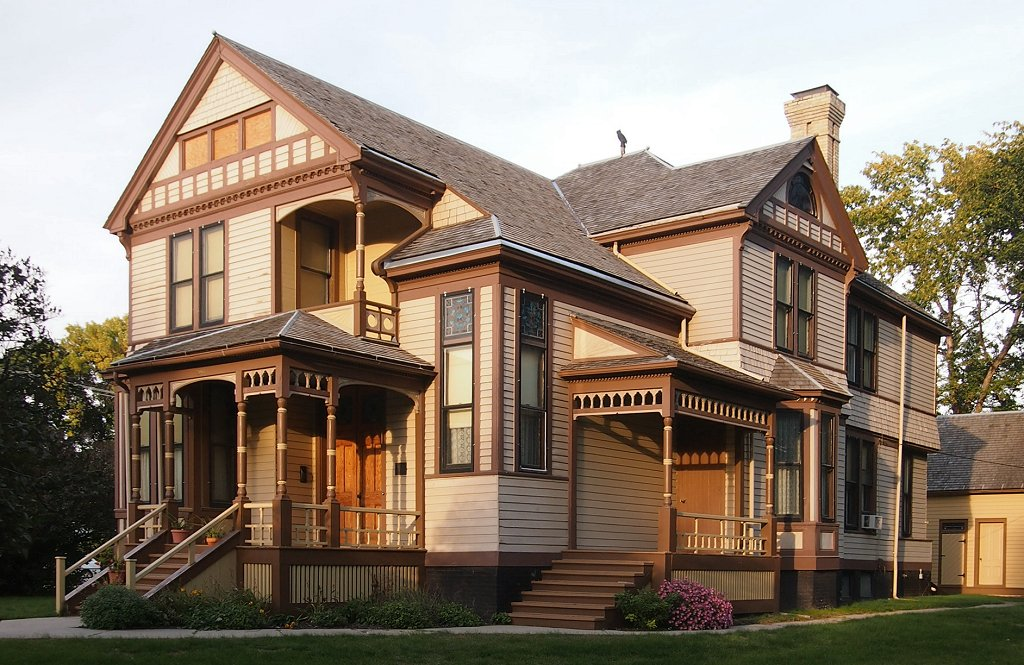
- The Comstock House viewed from the southwest

- Location within Minnesota Location within the United States
- Location: 506 8th Street South, Moorhead, Minnesota
- Coordinates: 46°52′8.5″N 96°46′3″W
- Area: 0.5 acres (0.20 ha)
- Built: 1882–3
- Architect: Kees & Fisk
- Architectural style: Queen Anne/Eastlake
- MPS: Clay County MRA
- NRHP reference No.: 74001011
- Designated: December 30, 1974

The Comstock House is a historic house museum in Moorhead, Minnesota, United States. It was built for Solomon Comstock and his family from 1882 to 1883 in a mix of Queen Anne and Eastlake style. Comstock (1842–1933) was one of Moorhead's first settlers and an influential figure in business, politics, civics, and education in the growing city and state.

The Comstock House is run by a partnership between the Minnesota Historical Society and the Historical and Cultural Society of Clay County. It was listed on the National Register of Historic Places in 1974 as the Solomon Gilman Comstock House for its state-level significance in the themes of architecture, commerce, education, exploration/settlement, industry, politics/government, and transportation. It was nominated for its association with Solomon Comstock, who was instrumental in growing Moorhead from a pioneer village to a "booming railroad town", and for its exemplary late Victorian architecture.

== Background and early history ==
Solomon Comstock came to Moorhead with the Northern Pacific Railway in 1871 as a track layer after his law career in Omaha, Nebraska, and Saint Paul, Minnesota, stalled. Within ten years of arriving he became the first Clay County Attorney, a Minnesota senator, owner of the Northwest Land Company, and a business associate of James J. Hill.

After two large floods in 1880 and 1881, Comstock decided to move out of the area by the Red River where the family first lived, the Points neighborhood. He planned to build a large house that would shelter his growing family at a safe distance from the flood waters as well as Moorhead's rough saloon district. A plot in the Highlands addition of Moorhead fit all of these criteria.

Comstock chose a Minneapolis architecture firm, Kees & Fisk, to design the home. They used a combination of Queen Anne and Eastlake styles in the eleven-room structure. The property's outbuildings included a carriage house and an ice house; the latter was demolished in the late 1950s. To support Fargo–Moorhead business, Comstock hired local contractors to complete the project.

Comstock was hands-on with the construction of the home, picking out the different types of wood that were used throughout the structure. He spared no expense. A clause in the contract with the builders required them to use the "best available materials" or risk replacement at the cost of the contractor.

The Comstocks were prominent Moorhead citizens, and their house hosted many people and community organizations from around Moorhead. Sarah Comstock, Solomon's wife, was the first president of the Moorhead Public Library Board. Before the completion of the library building in 1906, board members conducted meetings around the Comstock family's dining room table. The Moorhead Women's Club, of which Sarah was a founding member, also met at the Comstock House.

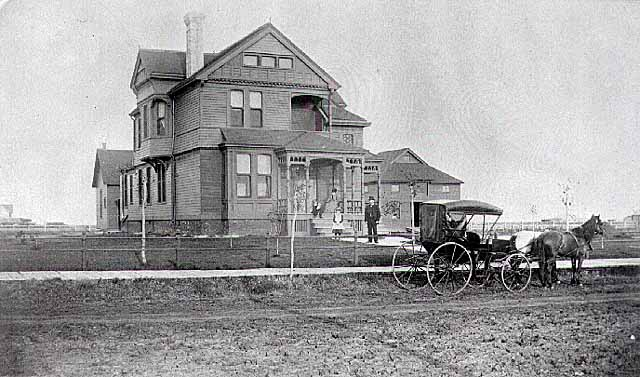
The Comstock House in 1885, shortly after completion

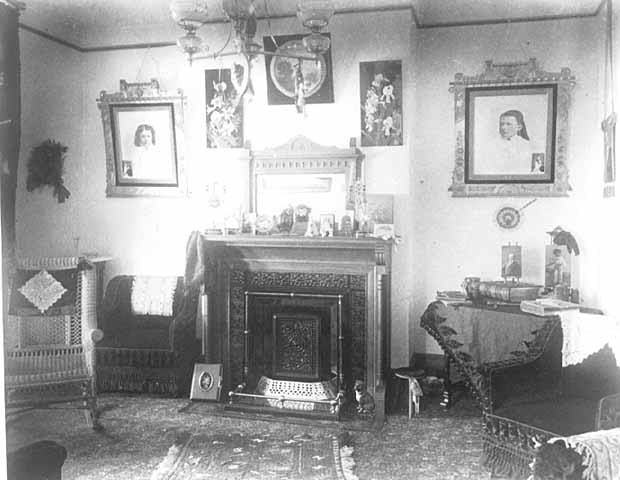
Reception room or small parlor to left of front door ca. 1900

== Later history ==
The Comstock House stayed in family hands until 1965, when George Comstock and his wife Frances Frazier Comstock donated it to the Minnesota Historical Society (MNHS). In 1974 the house was added to the National Register of Historic Places. The Comstock House Historical Society was formed to help restore the home to its 1883 appearance. After six years of fundraising, the house opened for public tours in 1980.

The largest renovation project at the Comstock House began in 1988, when MNHS employee Kendra Dillard created a furnishing plan. To carry it out, staff hired restorers to replace wallpaper, install new carpeting, and reupholster two chairs. Extensive research into the originals guided the effort; Dillard identified the chairs' original upholstery and worked with a company in Boston to create and emboss an exact duplicate of the fabric.

In 2004 the City of Moorhead signed a contract with the Minnesota Historical Society to manage the day-to-day operations of the Comstock House. It did so until 2015, when the house was closed to the public for a year during a lead paint remediation project. After the house reopened in 2016, the Historical and Cultural Society of Clay County took over management.

== See also ==
- List of museums in Minnesota
- National Register of Historic Places listings in Clay County, Minnesota
