= Comstock Music Festivals =

Music festivals in Nebraska, US

Coordinates: 41.5973°N 99.2325°W

The Comstock Music Festivals are held on the 2nd Wind Ranch, north of the small community of Comstock, Nebraska. The annual music festivals, include Comstock Rock (Classic Rock), Comstock Windmill Festival (Country), and Godstock (Christian). These are Nebraska's largest music festivals, with Comstock Rock ranking among the largest in the United States, attracting over 50,000 attendees through the 4 days in mid July. During the festivals, 2nd Wind Ranch is the host to music goers from all over the country.

== Background ==
The first Comstock Windmill Festival in June 2000 featuring country star Brad Paisley was the first installment of an annual event that would bring in country acts from all over the country. Comstock Windmill Festival 2001 expanded into a four-day festival.

In 2002 a variety of rock bands took part in a multi-day festival, dubbed Comstock Rock. The rock festival has featured many of the biggest names in classic rock which draws people from all over the nation.

The first Godstock took place in August 2003 and featured some of Christian music's biggest names.

In 2005, one death and several injuries, in addition to a large number of minors charged with possession of alcohol, brought negative attention to alcohol consumption at the Rock festival. The State of Nebraska halted the liquor licensing process before the 2006 season following allegations of underaged drinking, and the organizers were forced to modify the rules for vending of alcoholic beverages for the 2006 festival season. Vendors were forced to comply with the new rules in order for the festival to receive the required liquor licence. About 45 security and 20 local law enforcement officers were on site for the 2006 festival as well as EMTs.

After the 2006 Comstock events, financial pressures caused a delay in booking and announcement of the 2007 line up. There was a question of whether the Comstock Windmill Festival would even continue. Those concerns were laid to rest with the announcement that Viaero Wireless, a cellular service provider, would sponsor and invest heavily to ensure its financial viability. In early 2007 Viaero Wireless became a sponsor of the Comstock Music Series and announced its first country headliners: Big and Rich and the return of Kenny Rogers. The Viaero Wireless Sponsorship ended after one year.

In 2008 after questions of whether the festival would continue or not, the festival gained new ownership. Concerts were held in June and July under new management. These events are now being called Comstock Music Series which include both country and rock events.
