= Comstock Township, Marshall County, Minnesota =

Comstock Township, Minnesota
- Township
- Comstock Township Hall

- Location of Comstock Township, within Marshall County, Minnesota
- Coordinates: 48°14′2″N 96°33′47″W
- Country: United States
- State: Minnesota
- County: Marshall

Area
  - Total: 45.3 sq mi (117.2 km^{2})
  - Land: 45.3 sq mi (117.2 km^{2})
  - Water: 0 sq mi (0.0 km^{2})
- Elevation: 935 ft (285 m)

Population (2020)
  - Total: 127
  - Density: 2.81/sq mi (1.08/km^{2})
- Time zone: UTC-6 (Central (CST))
  - Summer (DST): UTC-5 (CDT)
- FIPS code: 27-12880
- GNIS feature ID: 0663860

Comstock Township is a township in Marshall County, Minnesota. As of the 2020 census, the township population was 127.

== History ==
Comstock Township was organized in 1881, and named for Solomon Comstock, a U.S. representative from Minnesota.

== Geography ==
According to the United States Census Bureau, the township has a total area of 45.3 square miles (117 km^{2}), all land.

== Demographics ==
As of the census of 2000, there were 135 people, 55 households, and 42 families residing in the township. The population density was 3.0 inhabitants per square mile (1.2/km^{2}). There were 64 housing units at an average density of 1.4 per square mile (0.54/km^{2}). The racial makeup of the township was 90.37% White, 8.15% from other races, and 1.48% from two or more races. Hispanic or Latino of any race were 8.15% of the population.

There were 55 households, out of which 23.6% had children under the age of 18 living with them, 67.3% were married couples living together, 1.8% had a female householder with no husband present, and 23.6% were non-families. 23.6% of all households were made up of individuals, and 9.1% had someone living alone who was 65 years of age or older. The average household size was 2.45 and the average family size was 2.74.

In the township the population was spread out, with 21.5% under the age of 18, 7.4% from 18 to 24, 20.7% from 25 to 44, 34.1% from 45 to 64, and 16.3% who were 65 years of age or older. The median age was 46 years. For every 100 females, there were 121.3 males. For every 100 females age 18 and over, there were 116.3 males.

The median income for a household in the township was $33,125, and the median income for a family was $36,250. Males had a median income of $30,417 versus $31,250 for females. The per capita income for the township was $13,890. There were 11.8% of families and 13.9% of the population living below the poverty line, including 14.3% of under eighteens and 38.1% of those over 64.
