= Comstock, Minnesota =

City in Minnesota, United States

- City
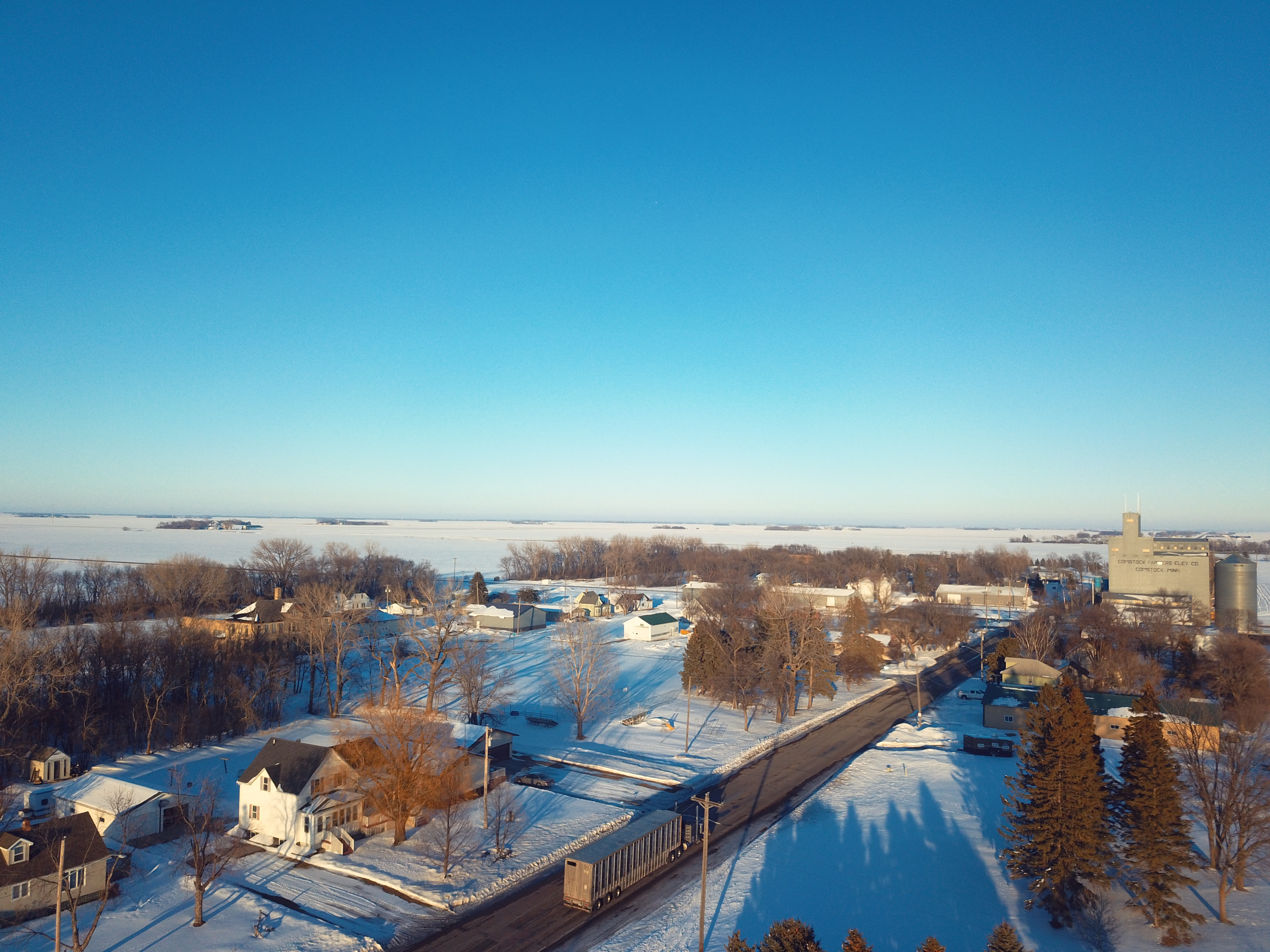

- Location of Comstock within Clay County and state of Minnesota
- Coordinates: 46°39′36″N 96°44′49″W
- Country: United States
- State: Minnesota
- County: Clay
- Incorporated: November 7, 1921

Government
  - Mayor: Darin Eisinger

Area
  - Total: 0.231 sq mi (0.598 km^{2})
  - Land: 0.231 sq mi (0.598 km^{2})
  - Water: 0 sq mi (0.000 km^{2})
- Elevation: 922 ft (281 m)

Population (2020)
  - Total: 100
  - Estimate (2022): 102
  - Density: 428/sq mi (165.4/km^{2})
- Time zone: UTC−6 (Central (CST))
  - Summer (DST): UTC−5 (CDT)
- ZIP Code: 56525
- Area code: 218
- FIPS code: 27-12862
- GNIS feature ID: 2393616
- Sales tax: 7.375%

Comstock is a city in Clay County, Minnesota, United States. The population was 100 at the 2020 census.

== History ==
A post office called Comstock has been in operation since 1890. The city was named for Solomon Comstock, a U.S. Representative from Minnesota.

== Geography ==
According to the United States Census Bureau, the city has a total area of 0.231 square miles (0.60 km^{2}), all land.

Comstock is along U.S. Highway 75 and Clay County Road 2, 160th Avenue South.

== Demographics ==
Historical population
Census	Pop.	Note	%±
1930	157		—
1940	134		−14.6%
1950	139		3.7%
1960	138		−0.7%
1970	135		−2.2%
1980	110		−18.5%
1990	123		11.8%
2000	123		0.0%
2010	93		−24.4%
2020	100		7.5%
2022 (est.)	102		2.0%
U.S. Decennial Census; 2020 Census

=== 2010 census ===
As of the 2010 census, there were 93 people, 38 households, and 27 families living in the city. The population density was 422.7 inhabitants per square mile (163.2/km^{2}). There were 44 housing units at an average density of 200.0 per square mile (77.2/km^{2}). The racial makeup of the city was 100.0% White.

There were 38 households, of which 26.3% had children under the age of 18 living with them, 57.9% were married couples living together, 7.9% had a female householder with no husband present, 5.3% had a male householder with no wife present, and 28.9% were non-families. 23.7% of all households were made up of individuals. The average household size was 2.45 and the average family size was 2.93.

The median age in the city was 39.3 years. 24.7% of residents were under the age of 18; 3.4% were between the ages of 18 and 24; 29.1% were from 25 to 44; 24.8% were from 45 to 64; and 18.3% were 65 years of age or older. The gender makeup of the city was 58.1% male and 41.9% female.

=== 2000 census ===
As of the 2000 census, there were 123 people, 47 households, and 39 families living in the city. The population density was 570.5 inhabitants per square mile (220.3/km^{2}). There were 49 housing units at an average density of 227.3 per square mile (87.8/km^{2}). The racial makeup of the city was 95.12% White, 1.63% Native American, 1.63% Asian, 0.81% from other races, and 0.81% from two or more races. Hispanic or Latino of any race were 1.63% of the population.

There were 47 households, out of which 40.4% had children under the age of 18 living with them, 70.2% were married couples living together, 8.5% had a female householder with no husband present, and 17.0% were non-families. 14.9% of all households were made up of individuals, and 6.4% had someone living alone who was 65 years of age or older. The average household size was 2.62 and the average family size was 2.82.

In the city, the population was spread out, with 25.2% under the age of 18, 6.5% from 18 to 24, 26.8% from 25 to 44, 25.2% from 45 to 64, and 16.3% who were 65 years of age or older. The median age was 39 years. For every 100 females, there were 136.5 males. For every 100 females age 18 and over, there were 124.4 males.

The median income for a household in the city was $37,917, and the median income for a family was $41,563. Males had a median income of $29,286 versus $19,375 for females. The per capita income for the city was $19,781. There were no families and 2.2% of the population living below the poverty line, including no under eighteens and 9.4% of those over 64.
