= Comstock Township, Custer County, Nebraska =

Comstock Township
- Township
- Location in Custer County
- Coordinates: 41°35′26″N 099°14′51″W
- Country: United States
- State: Nebraska
- County: Custer

Area
  - Total: 31.08 sq mi (80.49 km^{2})
  - Land: 31.08 sq mi (80.49 km^{2})
  - Water: 0 sq mi (0 km^{2}) 0%
- Elevation: 2,283 ft (696 m)

Population (2020)
  - Total: 129
  - Density: 4.15/sq mi (1.60/km^{2})
- GNIS feature ID: 0837935

Comstock Township is one of thirty-one townships in Custer County, Nebraska, United States. The population was 129 at the 2020 census. A 2021 estimate placed the township's population at 127.

The Village of Comstock lies within the Township.

== See also ==
- County government in Nebraska
