= Prairie Home Cemetery =

Historic cemetery in Clay County, Minnesota, US

Coordinates: 46°51′56″N 96°46′01″W

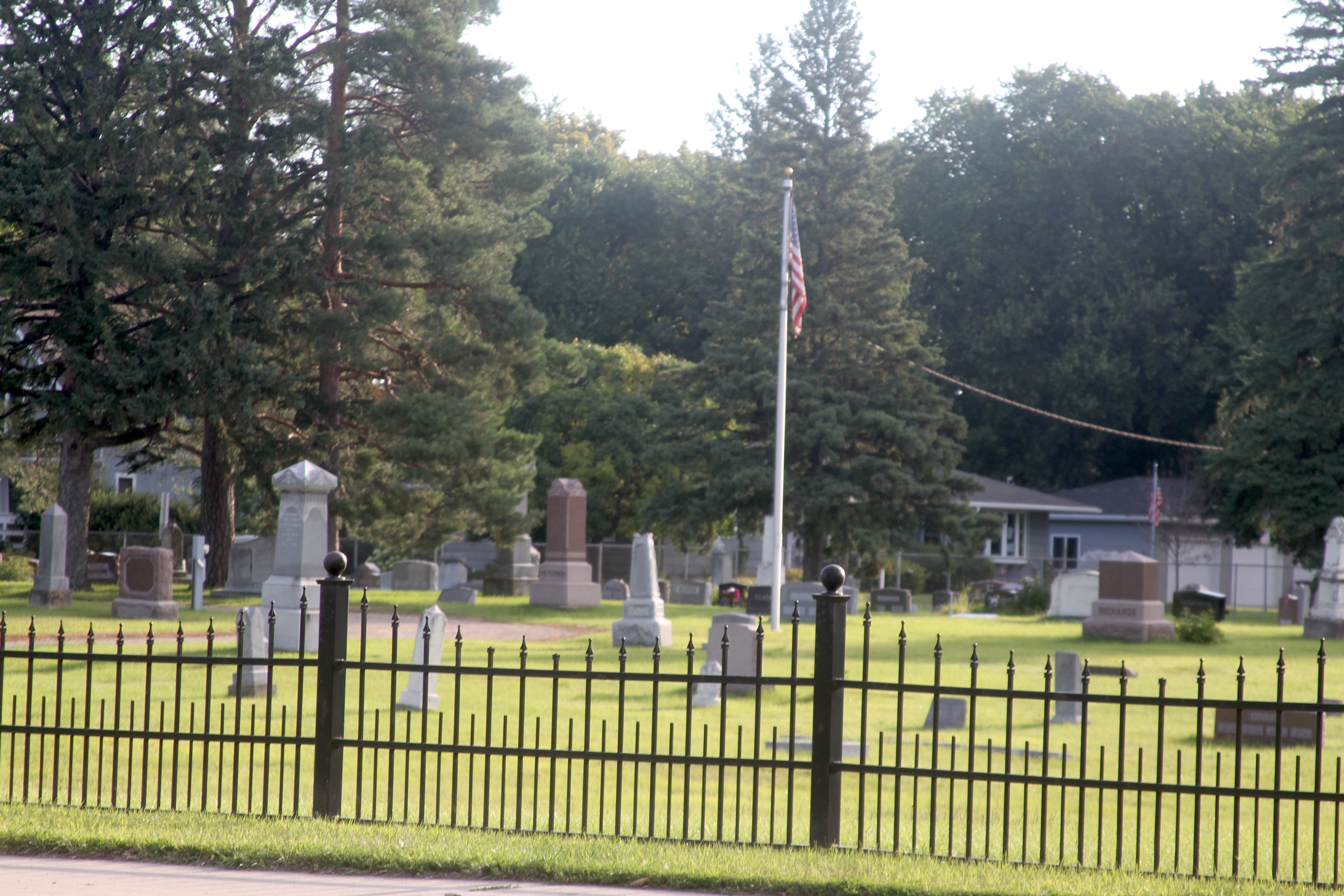
- Cemetery in evening
- Interactive map of Prairie Home Cemetery

Details
- Established: 1875
- Location: Moorhead, Minnesota

Prairie Home Cemetery is the oldest cemetery in Moorhead, Minnesota.

The cemetery was founded in 1875 by the Rev. Oscar Elmer, a Presbyterian minister who was the first ordained member of Christian clergy in Fargo–Moorhead. Rev. Elmer's brother John had drowned in the Red River of the North while visiting from New York in 1874. The condition of John Elmer's body when it was recovered meant that it could not be shipped back East, as was the usual custom, but had to be buried immediately in a makeshift grave. The following spring, Rev. Elmer organized a cemetery association, which formally created the Prairie Home Cemetery. John Elmer's body was then moved to the new cemetery.

The cemetery is still in operation. However, by 1929 the Prairie Home Cemetery Association merged with the Riverside Cemetery Association, which had organized a cemetery across the Red River in Fargo, North Dakota in 1884.

Garrison Keillor used the cemetery's name for the title of his long-running radio program A Prairie Home Companion.
