= History of the Big 12 Conference =

The Big 12 Conference is a 16-school collegiate athletic conference headquartered in Irving, Texas. The Big 12 is a member of the Division I of the National Collegiate Athletic Association (NCAA) for all sports. Its football teams compete in the Football Bowl Subdivision (FBS; formerly Division I-A), the higher of two levels of NCAA Division I football competition. Member schools are located in Arizona, Colorado, Florida, Iowa, Kansas, Ohio, Oklahoma, Texas, Utah, and West Virginia.

The Big 12 Conference is the second youngest of the major college athletic conferences in the United States. It was formed in 1994 when all 8 members of one of the oldest conferences, the Big Eight, were joined by 4 of the Texas members of one of the other oldest conferences, the Southwest Conference. From its formation until 2011, its 12 members competed in two divisions. Major membership changes came during the 2010–2013 Big 12 Conference realignment and still more changes came or will come during the 2021–2024 NCAA conference realignment.

In 2012, the Big 12 Conference formed an alliance with the Southeastern Conference for a 12-year deal starting in the 2014 season to host a joint post-season college bowl game between the champions of each conference in the Sugar Bowl (except for the 2014, 2017, 2020, and 2023 seasons when the bowl game is used as a College Football Playoff semifinal game).

== Origins ==
=== College Football Association last days ===
On June 27, 1984, the U.S. Supreme Court ruled in NCAA v. Board of Regents of the University of Oklahoma that the NCAA could not punish its membership for selling their media content. As a result, individual schools and athletic conferences were freed to negotiate contracts on their own behalf.

The Big Ten and Pacific-10 conferences sold their rights to ABC. Most of the rest of the Division I-A football programs (what is now called the Division I Football Bowl Subdivision, or FBS) chose to sell their rights together through an organization called the College Football Association to ABC and CBS. The primary function of the CFA was to negotiate television broadcast rights for its member conferences and independent colleges.

By 1990, the television landscape had changed and a number of the stronger programs saw opportunities for better deals outside of the CFA. Notre Dame left the CFA and sold their home game broadcast rights to NBC.

When the Southeastern Conference (SEC) invited the University of Arkansas and the University of South Carolina to join in 1990, it created shockwaves across the CFA. The other CFA conferences correctly assumed the SEC made these additions to create a better TV product with the idea of leaving the CFA.

The SEC represented one of the more valuable CFA assets. It seemed likely that if the SEC departed, the other conferences could have difficulty securing good TV deals.

After Arkansas' departure from the Southwest Conference, the SWC and Big Eight Conference recognized they were in a poor position. The SEC, with about 18% of the nation's TV audience, had a very strong TV position. The Big 8 had an 8.1% share. The Texas-based SWC had an even weaker hand with only 6.7%.

In February 1994, the SEC announced that it would leave the CFA and negotiate independently for a television deal that covered SEC schools only. This led The Dallas Morning News to proclaim that "the College Football Association as a television entity is dead". In 1995, the SEC and the Big East broke from the CFA, signing a national deal with CBS. The SEC would earn a staggering $95 million from the deal. More significantly, this change in television contracts ultimately would lead to a significant realignment of college conferences.

=== The Southwest Conference ===
For decades the Southwest Conference (SWC) was one of the most dominant football conferences in America. It was seen as a football peer to other elite conferences like the Pacific Coast Conference (precursor to today's Pac-12), Big Ten, SEC, and Big Eight.

Then in 1960, professional football came to Dallas and Houston. Attendance at Rice collapsed. For over two decades, the SWC membership struggled with the issue. In 1974 a lengthy Texas Monthly article detailed the attendance decline at Rice, SMU, and TCU, and suggested the SWC was in trouble because the University of Texas felt like it was subsidizing the conference. The conference collapsed in 1994.

Though it was not the only conference engaging in recruitment violations, the SWC ranked as one of the worst. At one point, the football programs at seven of the nine SWC schools—Arkansas and Rice were the only exceptions—were under some sort of NCAA sanction. SMU was given the "death penalty" for its rule violations.

By 1986, SWC schools' NCAA penalties and bowl game ineligibilities had begun to compromise the SWC brand, driving top Texas talent out of state. Even top schools that had mostly stayed clear of trouble found their recruiting diminished. After years of SWC schools doing well in bowls, they suddenly could not compete with the elite schools of other conferences. A December 18, 1986 Dallas Morning News article stated:

Recruiting experts say the allegations have chased Texas's home-grown talent to other conferences. And while other conferences raid the state, the SWC stays at home, making do with a shrinking talent pool. Earlier this month, seven of the Dallas area's leading recruits—including running back Barry Foster of nearby Duncanville, Texas, The Dallas Morning News' Offensive Player of the Year—said they no longer were interested in the SWC, calling it 'shaky' or 'screwed-up.' Said Bennie Perry, a defensive back from Bryan Adams High School in Dallas: 'You couldn't pay me to go to a Southwest Conference school, because they're getting into too much trouble.'"

As sanctions began to sap the quality of play at the top of the conference, the big three began to actively look at other conferences. In attempts to appease the conference powers, the other members made financial rule changes, eventually including allowing home teams to keep their gate revenue (gate revenue was a much larger portion of operating funds at that time). These efforts fell short of satisfying the bigger issues UT and A&M had with the SWC, but would appear to have played a role in UT's position going forward on revenue sharing.

Eventually, Arkansas departed for the SEC, effective July 1, 1991 (although the Razorbacks competed in the SWC during the 1991 football season). The SEC consisted primarily of public schools in rural areas or smaller cities (Vanderbilt was, and still is, the only private school in the SEC) that drew well and the conference had a much larger share of the nation's TV markets. As game day attendance and TV revenue drove athletic budgets, the SEC represented a much more financially sound organization.

UT athletic director DeLoss Dodds reflected on the importance of Arkansas' departure, saying, “What had to happen, [was] there had to be a crisis for change.”

Arkansas athletic director Frank Broyles, who played at Georgia Tech when the Yellow Jackets competed in the SEC, said that he was encouraged to leave by UT's and Texas A&M's leaders, because it would destabilize the conference, allowing them to do the same. The leaderships at UT and Texas A&M believed they would never be allowed to leave first. (In the summer of 1990, word would leak of Texas and Texas A&M thinking of following Arkansas into the SEC. Reaction in Texas would be very negative, with politicians threatening both schools' funding before the idea was tabled.)

The Southwest Conference could not find a replacement its membership would agree upon. The private schools were in denial of the depth of problems facing the conference. They suggested simply replacing Arkansas, a public school, with private schools BYU or Tulane, which left the SEC in 1966. With four private schools and four public schools already in the SWC, adding either choice could potentially give the private schools a voting majority.

Private or not, UT and Texas A&M were dead set against replacing Arkansas. The NCAA sanctions and Arkansas' departure made the conference appear broken to fans in Texas. Texas and Texas A&M's leaderships felt the conference was inherently flawed, with too many mouths to feed off too few TVs. Adding a single school was not going to change that dynamic, it would only create the public perception of a healed conference and prolong UT and Texas A&M's suffering.

=== "Predatory" conferences ===
Missouri showed interest in Big Ten membership after Penn State joined. Around 1993, the Big Ten explored adding Kansas, Missouri and Rutgers (which eventually was invited into the Big Ten in November 2012, joining officially on July 1, 2014), or other potential schools, to create a 14-team league with two divisions.

In the early 1990s, Texas had discussions with the Pac-10, a conference with similar academic views. An affiliation with the Pac-10 appealed to UT leaders. Former UT president Robert Berdahl told Mark Wagrin of the San Antonio Express-News: “Texas wanted desperately the academic patina that the Pac 10 yielded... To be associated with UCLA, Stanford and Cal in academics was very desirable.” The Pac-10 wanted to add UT and the University of Colorado. For some reason, an offer didn't come until after the formation of the Big 12.

Some reports state that Stanford refused to vote to admit UT in an effort to protect the Cardinal's conference dominance in non-revenue sports. (The Pac-10 required unanimous votes for expansion.)

(At the end of 1994, UT's athletic director DeLoss Dodds, as he was turning down the Pac-10, stated that the Pac-10 leadership informed UT they would have a standing invitation for the Longhorns. What is unclear is when the Pac-10 made that offer, although Dodds did use the word "always" in describing the offer.)

One report stated that the offer was changed to UT and Texas A&M. UT reportedly tried to carry Texas A&M with them into the Pac-10. No evidence confirms Pac-10 support for that idea. This change allegedly upset the leadership at Colorado and drove them to take a more active role in protecting the Big Eight. (Colorado's Chancellor James Corbridge was also the Big Eight chairman. He was very involved with the TV negotiations for the new conference and the integration of the Texas schools.)

UT then approached the Big Ten but was turned down, because the conference had recently instituted a moratorium on expansion.

Texas then turned to the SEC, and negotiations reached an advanced stage. UT abruptly withdrew after concluding that the SEC had no interest in strengthening academics. Berdahl said, “We were quite interested in raising academic standards... And the Southeastern Conference had absolutely no interest in that.”

Texas A&M had flirted with the SEC since the late 1980s. In 1993, it approached the conference about joining, partnering with the University of Houston. UT had given up on the SEC and Texas A&M's leadership didn't want to try leaving the SWC on their own. The SEC moved expansion plans to the back burner.

Then UT's interests turned to the Big Eight. Texas and Oklahoma's leaders both looked favorably on the idea of being in the same conference, but both schools had other options. Former Kansas State University president Jon Wefald voiced fears that if UT had joined the Pac-10, there would be no way for the Big Eight to ramp up their TV payouts in order to keep Oklahoma from joining the SEC for more lucrative TV payouts.

=== Negotiations with Texas and other schools ===
The Big Eight had been in pursuit of some kind of alliance with the Southwest Conference since Arkansas's departure destabilized that historic conference.

The Big Eight and SWC members saw the potential financial benefits of an alliance to negotiate television deals, but a true alliance of 16 teams that would retain the seven other SWC schools was not viewed as optimal by UT. Dodds and the Longhorn leadership viewed proposals of this sort as continuing business as usual in the SWC. Arkansas's departure allowed UT and Texas A&M to clear four or less profitable dates from their football schedules and eight or more from their basketball schedules.

For years the Big Eight could not interest UT in a merger. Without Texas to ensure the retention of Oklahoma, the Big Eight was not interested.

Reports at the end of 1993 disclosed the discussions of the Big Eight about adding BYU and half of the SWC, with SMU, TCU, Rice, and Houston "priced out" of the new conference.

The Big Eight began negotiations with ABC and ESPN for a new conference that would feature football powers Nebraska, Oklahoma, Colorado, and Texas.

=== Texas politicians ===
After the SEC announced their intent to leave the CFA, the Big 8 and SWC members re-opened discussions to sell their rights together. In a book called The Baylor Project by Barry G. Hankins and Donald D. Schmeltekoff about Baylor's place in Christian higher education on page 68 states that on February 11, 1994, SWC member schools' leaders met a few Big 8 leaders in Dallas to discuss potentially selling both leagues' media content in a package deal. Discussions broke down on February 16, reportedly over UT's interest in the Pac-10. The Big Eight began negotiating a deal that would include the full SWC as a partner and Texas A&M approached the SEC.

In Texas, word leaked out that UT & Texas A&M were close to leaving the SWC; UT to the Pac-10 or Big Eight and eventually Texas A&M to the SEC. Texas state senator David Sibley, a Baylor alumnus and member of the Senate Finance Committee, approached UT Chancellor Bill Cunningham and asked him pointedly whether UT planned to leave the SWC on its own for the Big Eight. Cunningham tried to change the subject. Ultimately he did not deny it.

Sibley approached Lt. Governor Bob Bullock, a Texas Tech alumnus. Texas state senator John Montford of Lubbock was equally motivated to protect Texas Tech's path to the Big 12. The trio put together a group of legislators who worked to ensure those schools were part of any new sports conference.

Bullock called together a meeting of supportive legislators as well as UT's and Texas A&M's leaders on February 20, 1994. UT Chancellor William Cunningham admitted that Texas planned to join the Big Eight and A&M's leadership still targeted the SEC.

A deal was worked out where all four schools would go together to the Big 12. Baylor and Texas Tech would join the Aggies in coming with UT into the new version of the Big Eight.

Texas's Governor Ann Richards, a Baylor and UT alumna, is often mistakenly credited with getting Baylor included, but, was absent from the February 20 meeting and no investigative reports confirm her active involvement. The Baylor Report claimed that she presented herself as neutral. Richards' former Chief of Staff, John Fainter, is on record saying "She just was not involved to any great degree in working that out...I'd have to say she was informed, but she wasn't pounding the table or anything like that." Richards was aware of the public perception of her involvement and the thought amused her.)

UT officials informed the Big Eight leadership that the Austin school was now receptive to an invitation and the Big Eight issued invitations to Texas, Texas A&M, Baylor, and Texas Tech. All four schools quickly accepted.

== Formation ==
On February 25, 1994, it was announced that a new conference would be formed from all 8 of the members of the Big Eight and four of the Texas member colleges of the Southwest Conference. Though the name would not be made official for several months, newspaper accounts immediately dubbed the new entity the "Big 12".

Charter members of the Big 12 Conference included all 8 of the schools from the Big 8 Conference:

- University of Colorado Boulder
- Iowa State University
- University of Kansas
- Kansas State University
- University of Missouri
- University of Nebraska–Lincoln
- University of Oklahoma
- Oklahoma State University–Stillwater

Charter members of the Big 12 Conference included 4 of the schools from the Southwest Conference:

- Baylor University
- University of Texas at Austin
- Texas A&M University
- Texas Tech University

The remaining Southwest Conference members of the University of Houston, Rice University, Southern Methodist University, and Texas Christian University were initially considered but ultimately left out of the new soon-to-be Big 12 conference. The conference also expressed interest in other regions with the potential add of Brigham Young University and the University of New Mexico. However the conference settled on 12 founding members.

Three months after formation, the schools of the new conference officially announced the conference's name: the Big 12 Conference. Although the new conference was essentially the Big Eight plus the four Texas schools, the Big 12 did not, and to this day still does not, claim the Big Eight's history as its own. Conference competition commenced on August 31, 1996. Steve Hatchell, former Southwest Conference commissioner, was named Big 12 commissioner in March 1995 and later brought experienced SWC administrators Brad Clements and Bo Carter to help make a smooth transition before the new league started in '96.

Seven cities were considered for the conference's headquarters including: Colorado Springs, Dallas, Denver, Kansas City (the former headquarters of the Big Eight), Lubbock, Texas, Oklahoma City, and Omaha, Nebraska, before Dallas was chosen as headquarters in May 1995. Later (in 2006) the Big 12 relocated to nearby Irving.

From the conference's formation until the 2010–11 season, the Big 12 was split into two divisions for football. The Oklahoma and Texas schools formed the South Division, while the six northernmost schools formed the North Division.

In December 1994, the Pacific-10 Conference (now known as the Pac-12) voted to offer membership to Colorado but the CU Regents rejected the offer in a 6–3 vote, opting to stay in the new Big 12.

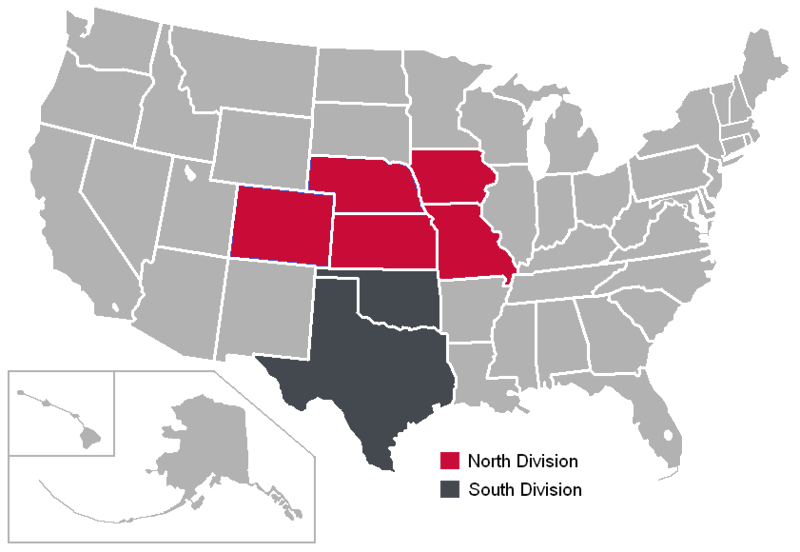
A map of the Big 12 as it existed from 1996 to 2011, with North (red) and South (grey) divisions

== Potential expansion in the conference's early years ==
The four Southwest Conference schools were not the only candidates the Big Eight considered. After the Big 12 was founded, leaks in 1994 claimed that the conference also had a plan for a 14 team membership in order to secure a larger TV share than the SEC, something some of the conference leadership felt might be vital for its future TV negotiations.

Reports confirmed that Brigham Young University and the University of New Mexico, then in the Western Athletic Conference (WAC), were actively considered for Big 12 membership and if the conference should then decide to go to 16 schools, the University of Louisville and the University of Memphis would be favorites to fill those slots. In anticipation of the possibility of expansion to 14 by 1996, the new conference trademarked both "Big 12" and "Big 14". The idea was that BYU and New Mexico would raise the conference footprint to 20% of the nation's TV households while also giving the northern division another football powerhouse in BYU. Articles of the day suggested support for the idea was not uniform among Big 12 schools

UNM's athletic director Rudy Davalos, former athletic director at the University of Houston, questioned the logic of the Big 12 adding UNM. Davalos publicly expressed a commitment to the WAC. Former Baylor President Herbert H. Reynolds speaks of making the case to his board that much of the value of the Big 12 for Baylor arose from the Waco university being the only private school in the conference.

TCU's AD at the time, Frank Windegger was told by colleagues that TCU was discussed as a package deal with BYU, with the idea even going to a vote --- but the expansion vote was narrowly defeated.

Ultimately the conference chose to stay at 12 members. BYU's athletic director Clayne Jensen told the press that while the addition of BYU could likely pay for the Cougars' admission as the conference's 13th member, it appeared no other candidate school made financial sense to allow to become the 14th member.

The greater influence held by Oklahoma, Texas and Texas A&M would later be cited repeatedly as a key component in Nebraska's eventual decision to leave.

== Conference realignment ==
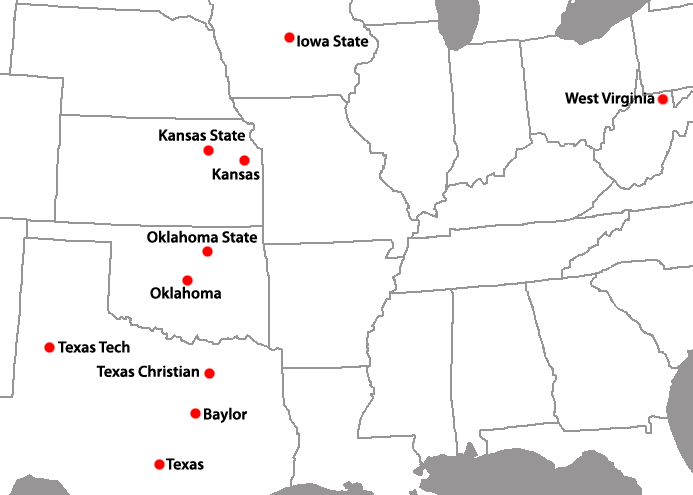
Locations of the Big 12 Conference full-member institutions following the 2010-13 realignment.

During the 2010–2014 NCAA conference realignment, the Big 12 was one of the more heavily impacted conferences. Persistent rumors of the Pac-10 and Big Ten targeting key members created unease and suspicion. Questions about TV contracts and dissatisfaction with the Big 12's policy of unequal revenue sharing created more conflict. This erosion of trust allowed other conferences to raid the Big 12.

The Big 12 lost four members between 2010 and 2013, replaced by two others (Colorado, Nebraska, Missouri, and Texas A&M left; TCU and West Virginia joined). Remaining below 12 members would end the Big 12's divisional format, as the NCAA then only allowed "exempt" football championship games (i.e., games that do not count against the limit of 12 regular-season games) in conferences with at least 12 teams. (Note: The NCAA changed that rule in 2016, allowing conferences with full round-robin schedules to play exempt championship games regardless of their membership numbers, and the Big 12 reinstated its championship game in 2017.)

Following these departures, the Conference chose to retain the "Big 12" name and logo despite dropping to ten schools, a marketing decision similar to the Big Ten Conference's choice to keep its name after its membership increased to 11 in 1990 with the addition of Penn State (its membership now stands at 18 with the later additions of Nebraska, Maryland, Rutgers, UCLA, USC, Oregon and Washington). This decision by the Big 12 reminded fans of the near collapse of the conference in the realignment period and to suggest the limited expansion options facing the conference.

=== 2010 ===
==== Destabilization ====
In May 2010, reports speculated that the Big 12 Conference was on the verge of dissolution. In February, reports stated the desire by the Pac-10 to expand the conference. The article said that the only school that "moved the needle" financially for the Pac-10 was Texas.

In March, the Big Ten received the initial report from consultants hired to investigate five potential expansion candidates, including Missouri. The initial report supported the expansion.

On April 20 and May 3, Sports Illustrated predicted that the Big Ten would ultimately add Nebraska.

Later in May the Big Ten Conference reportedly issued "initial offers" to Missouri, Nebraska, Notre Dame and Rutgers. On May 12, Big Ten commissioner Jim Delany emailed conference officials, denying that any offers had been made. The league planned to take no action until the league Presidents met in June.

During the Big 12 meetings in June, the Pac-10 was rumored to be on the verge of inviting Colorado, Texas, Texas A&M, Texas Tech, Oklahoma, Oklahoma State to join them, a proposal that was dubbed Pac-16.

The Pac-10 had tried to land Texas and Colorado in 1994. This new offer acknowledged that Texas was unlikely to leave the Big 12 without Oklahoma due to the Red River Rivalry's importance to UT's athletic budget. Both schools had in-state rival schools that needed to be included.

Although the Pac-10's attempt bears a number of similarities to the Big 8's raid of the SWC, fans of the targeted Texas schools were resistant. This suggested that the Pac-10 leadership did a poor job of selling the benefits of Pac-10 membership. The Pac-10 was considered too distant for many fans. In contrast, Big 12 concerns about travel distance tended to originate from Dallas/Fort Worth and Houston, cities whose schools were to be excluded.

Rumors that the Big Ten was interested in Texas also emerged. Texas Athletic Director DeLoss Dodds openly talked about both rumors in the media. On June 3, Texas A&M athletic director Bill Byrne said that the Aggies might consider joining the SEC, should the Big 12 collapse.

Texas and Texas A&M held veto power over each other that would keep them in the same conference. The Big 10 was rumored to be considering adding Missouri and leaving Nebraska stranded in the remains of the Big 12, while the state of Texas reportedly might allow Texas A&M to go the SEC, but that UT would likely not play the Aggies should they leave.

==== Unequal revenue ====
One point of contention in the Big 12 was the unequal distribution of TV revenue, as was common in most other top conferences. Nebraska, Texas, Texas A&M, and Oklahoma objected to equal sharing, according to former Commissioner Dan Beebe. Four votes gave them the ability to block revenue sharing votes. After his 2011 firing, Beebe said that Oklahoma, Nebraska, and even Texas A&M were interested in "developing their own distribution systems" for sports programs.

==== Defections begin ====
On June 5, a movement was reportedly building in Texas to force the Pac-10 to invite Baylor instead of Colorado. This would give Texas a solid voting block of 4 Texas schools and two strongly aligned Oklahoma schools. The Pac-10 quickly eliminated that possibility by modifying their original offer (a package deal for all six schools) to be a standalone offer for Colorado and a package deal for the other five.

On June 10, Colorado joined the Pac-10, to be effective in 2012, but later advanced to July 1, 2011. Colorado reportedly accepted quickly for fear that Baylor would force its way in, leaving Colorado in a dissolving conference. On June 11, Nebraska applied for and was accepted into the Big Ten, effective July 1, 2011.

The departures of the Texas teams to the Pac-10 was reportedly imminent, including a possibility that Texas A&M might instead choose the SEC.

With Texas A&M opposed to joining, the Pac-10 was rumored to consider either Kansas or Utah for the 16th team.

==== June 14 agreement ====
On June 14, the Big 12 announced a deal to save the conference. Lobbying by Baylor, Iowa State, Kansas, Kansas State and Missouri, supported by pressure from other programs who did not want elite conferences to become 16-team "superconferences". The deal required a restructured revenue sharing agreement that guaranteed Oklahoma, Texas, and Texas A&M $20 million each per year (the other schools would split the rest) and an unexpectedly lucrative television deal if the conference stayed together.

With the big three securing payments that more or less matched what they would have received in a Pac-16 and Texas committing to the conference, Oklahoma stayed and Texas A&M's exit was temporarily obscured.

In the 2010 round of realignment, UT had secured a better conference TV deal and a bigger share of that deal and gained what Dodds considered an easier path to the national title game. It also was permitted its own network (the Longhorn Network) and had gotten Nebraska out of the conference. However, the $20 million payouts did not soothe hard feelings at Texas A&M and Oklahoma. A&M's president at the time, R. Bowen Loftin, was particularly miffed, recalling in a 2021 interview that he felt discomfort with Texas' dominance in Big 12 internal affairs since attending his first conference meeting as president in 2009, and that he had felt especially insulted by remarks that UT's then-president Bill Powers made when Loftin asked him about UT's flirtation with the Pac-10 in a 2010 meeting.

Texas A&M and Oklahoma ended contact with the Southeastern Conference, which had been pursuing both schools as potential candidates if their conference decided to expand past 12 members.

On June 16, 2010, Houston state lawmakers Garnet Coleman and Bill Callegari co-wrote a letter asking Big 12 officials to consider adding the University of Houston (then a Conference USA member) to the Big 12.

=== 2011 ===
==== Grant of Rights agreement ====
Following the near disaster in 2010, the other five pushed for a spring vote on a "Grant of Rights" deal that would grant all sports media rights of member schools to the conference. This would make it very difficult for a key school to leave. The proposal needed a 75% majority, but was defeated by Texas, Oklahoma and Texas A&M.

==== Longhorn Network ====
ESPN planned to launch the Longhorn Network (LHN) and to include Texas high school football games. The governing body for sports at Texas public high schools, the University Interscholastic League, is operated by UT, and the UIL chair directly reports to a UT vice president. Oklahoma and Texas A&M objected that broadcasting high school games would create a recruiting advantage for the Longhorns. Texas A&M went so far as to accuse Texas of violating NCAA rules.

In addition to a non-conference game each season, ESPN wanted a Big 12 Conference game on the Longhorn Network. At the same Big 12 meeting discussing high school football broadcasts, it was agreed that a conference game would be acceptable as long as both schools and the conference office approved the broadcast.

It was reported that ESPN asked Texas Tech for permission to broadcast their November 5 game against the Longhorns on the network. ESPN told the university that the game would most likely not be carried on an ESPN network, leaving LHN as the only option. In return, ESPN promised to televise two non-conference football games over the next four seasons, broadcast some other non-football programming, $5 million cash and help from the network to try to arrange a home-and-home series against a top BCS conference school. Texas Tech passed on the offer, with chancellor Kent Hance explaining, "I don't want a Tech fan to have to give one dime to the Longhorn Network".

ESPN then contacted Oklahoma State, without success. Texas Athletics eventually announced that the Kansas Jayhawks had agreed to let their game against the Longhorns on October 29 be shown on the network (KU's third tier media rights are also managed by LHN co-owner IMG College). The agreement allowed the Longhorn Network to be the national carrier of the game except in Kansas markets, where the game was shown on local network affiliates.

==== Texas A&M ====
In August 2011, A&M announced plans to apply to join an unspecified conference. Its desire to leave the Big 12 was presented as concerns about conference stability and the Longhorn Network. In the aforementioned 2021 interview, Loftin recalled, "When the LHN was announced, that just galvanized our former and current students. We went from 50-50 to 95-5 [in favor of the SEC] almost overnight."

On September 2, David Boren, president of the University of Oklahoma, announced that his school was actively re-evaluating its conference membership. Having moved on from its SEC flirtation over concerns of a booster-led backslide into recruiting violations, Oklahoma began pursuing Pac-12 membership in a package deal with Oklahoma State, due to its frustration with the Big 12. Dodds and UT president William Powers attempted to convince OU to stay, but they were unsuccessful. OU reportedly liked the potential of upgrading their academic and research reputation in an effort to earn AAU status in addition to their football coaching staff's desire to expand recruiting efforts into California.

Having just expanded to 12 and landed a very lucrative TV deal, the Pac-12 leaders were not actively looking to expand again. They opted to wait until the SEC added Texas A&M before inviting the Oklahoma schools.

In mid-September, the SEC accepted Texas A&M as its thirteenth member, conditional upon a reaffirmation that the Big 12 would not pursue legal action. The SEC later reported that they had been assured that the Big 12 would waive its rights to legal action. However, Baylor rejected that they had waived their school's rights to pursue legal action for tortious interference. Several other Big 12 schools adopted Baylor's position.

The SEC leadership were angry and embarrassed about being misled. On September 25, the SEC announced that Texas A&M was being accepted unconditionally—regardless of legal threats. Texas A&M announced the school would officially join the SEC on July 1, 2012. As part of Texas A&M's settlement for their exit, the Big 12 Conference withheld $12.4 million of Big 12 revenue otherwise due to Texas A&M.

==== Media rights and expansion ====
The Big 12 said it would form a committee to replace Texas A&M with at least one other school. The Oklahoma schools were reportedly still considering applying to the Pac-12, while the other five schools entered talks with the Big East.

Further realignment was temporarily halted on September 20, when the Pac-12 reiterated its desire to remain a twelve-school conference, as Texas would not compromise on the Longhorn Network or commit to equal revenue sharing. The Pac-12 also publicly confirmed the lack of support for adding Oklahoma and Oklahoma State. After Oklahoma and Oklahoma State's path to the Pac-12 crumbled, an Oklahoma source leaked to the media that Oklahoma was just attempting to use the threat of departure to reform the Big 12.

With no prospect of Pac-12 membership, Oklahoma and Texas's positions changed dramatically and preserving the Big 12 became those schools' primary goal. Missouri and Oklahoma in particular would play a leadership role in stabilizing the Big 12. On September 23, Missouri Chancellor Brady Deaton, the Chairman of the Big 12 Board of Directors, announced that the conference presidents agreed in principle to pursue granting member school media rights to the conference. Oklahoma's President David Boren called the agreement "'essential' for the league’s future". UT's DeLoss Dodds had opposed the idea saying, "UT officials 'don’t want to sign over' any TV rights to the league", the day before all the league's presidents (including UT's) endorsed the idea.

The same day, the Big 12 announced the departure of Commissioner Dan Beebe, who was seen as dominated by Texas, replaced by Interim commissioner Chuck Neinas, a former Big Eight commissioner. Neinas took over on October 3.

==== Broadcast revenue ====
On October 5 the Big 12 agreed to equally distribute Tier I and II television revenues. Dodds had long been firmly against equal sharing of TV revenue, but UT blessed the deal to stabilize the conference.

On October 6, the Big 12 Conference Board of Directors, acting upon a unanimous recommendation of the expansion committee, authorized negotiations with Texas Christian University (TCU) to become a member. TCU had recently agreed to join the Big East Conference. but their fans had wanted to be in the Big 12 since the SWC crashed. On October 10, Texas Christian University's board of trustees voted to accept the invitation, joining on July 1, 2012.

A Big 12 official named Brigham Young University and the University of Louisville as other expansion candidates. It would later leak that the Big 12's television partners were unenthusiastic about BYU.

With the loss of Texas A&M and its Aggie fan base, the conference thought there was now a need/opening for another Texas school. While the TCU fan base was significantly smaller, TCU was in a good location. With the SEC now having a significant Texas presence, adding Dallas/Fort Worth-based TCU made sense since non-Texas-based Big 12 schools could possibly use the addition of TCU to the Big 12 as a recruiting tool.

TCU had long rivalries with several Big 12 schools, notably with Baylor, dating back to 1899.

==== Missouri leaves ====
By rushing the addition of the Aggies, the SEC had created a two-division, 13-team conference for 2012. They needed an acceptable 14th team immediately to ease the scheduling issues created by the Aggies. While the Big 12 had strong candidates, the conference was still unstable.

Despite the work of the Missouri Chancellor to evolve the Big 12, on October 4, Missouri's Board of Curators authorized the school's president to explore applying to other conferences.

A year earlier, speculation grew that Missouri was interested in becoming the Big Ten's twelfth member and was the favorite, but instead Nebraska became the choice.

On October 6, the day after the revenue sharing change, the Big 12 Board of Directors voted 8–0 to formally grant their media rights to the conference. On advice of the Missouri legal counsel, Missouri opted not to vote.

On October 11, Neinas stated that Missouri would remain for the 2012 season. In spite of Neinas's statement, on October 21 its Board of Curators authorized Chancellor Deaton to move the school out of the Big 12 Conference should that be in the school's best interest. The Big 12 needed to have a replacement for Missouri lined up, because the conference needed 10 schools to fulfill its TV contracts.

On November 6, Missouri officially announced that it would join the Southeastern Conference effective July 1, 2012. As compensation for the departure, the Big 12 withheld $12.4 million of the revenue it would have shared with Missouri; additionally, they announced that Missouri would not share the revenue from a newly signed contract between the Big 12 Conference and Fox Sports. Missouri also agreed to pay the Big 12 Conference for its share of officiating costs of its final year in the conference, as it had done in prior years (an estimated payment of $500,000).

==== West Virginia replaces Missouri ====
On October 25, word leaked that West Virginia would replace Missouri. The next day The New York Times reported the Big 12 had backed off their verbal commitment to West Virginia and was now split between Louisville and West Virginia after some Big 12 leaders were lobbied by U.S. Senator Mitch McConnell. West Virginia cancelled plans for a press conference. The conference requested that West Virginia supply it with more information.

On October 28, WVU officially joined the Big 12 and committed to begin play in the 2012 season.

The Mountaineers' former conference, the Big East Conference, required 27 months of notice prior to withdrawal, as drafted by West Virginia's legal team. Big East Commissioner John Marinatto said that West Virginia would not be allowed to leave before July 1, 2014.

In response, West Virginia filed a lawsuit to declare invalid the withdrawal-notice requirement stipulated in the Big East's bylaws. The lawsuit alleged that the Big East breached its fiduciary duty by allowing several football-playing members to depart, causing the conference to no longer be a major football conference and jeopardizing its continued existence. Because of this, West Virginia alleged, its continued performance under the contract had become unreasonably burdensome and its original purpose in entering into the contract had been eliminated.

West Virginia stated its belief that its notice to withdraw in 2012 was indeed accepted, when the Big East Conference accepted its payment of half the $5 million withdrawal penalty. Marinatto denied the allegations.

The Big East countersued. West Virginia's request to dismiss the suit was denied. The Big East Conference's lawsuit was scheduled to begin arguments in April 2012, but on February 14, 2012, West Virginia announced that it had settled.

This cleared the final hurdle for West Virginia. While terms of the settlement were confidential, West Virginia's athletic director said that the settlement would be paid only from private donations and money the athletes raised. According to an anonymous source, the Big East would be paid $20 million, including $11 million from West Virginia and $9 million by the Big 12. The agreement apparently stipulated that WVU's $2.5 million exit fee and revenue-sharing money would be applied towards the settlement.

=== 2016 ===
On July 19, 2016, Big 12 Commissioner Bob Bowlsby announced that the conference had authorized him to begin talks with schools that were interested in joining the conference. The main driving force behind the proposed expansion was to add a conference championship game, which was seen as a crucial extra game that could help the conference earn a college football playoff spot, which the conference had failed to achieve at that point. On August 31, 2016, ESPN reported that the BIG 12 had narrowed its list of potential schools down to 12, Air Force, BYU, UCF, Cincinnati, Colorado State, UConn, Houston, Rice, South Florida, SMU, Temple and Tulane. The conference opted not to pursue schools such as Arkansas State, Boise State, East Carolina, New Mexico, Northern Illinois, San Diego State and UNLV, schools that were linked to this potential expansion or had publicly expressed interest in joining the conference.

On September 2, 2016, ESPN reported that the University of Memphis was officially ruled out as a potential member. No expansion actually eventuated from any of these efforts at the time.

Houston was seen as a top contender for a position, but pushback from other Texas schools resulted in their inclusion being unlikely. BYU’s refusal to schedule games on Sunday hurt their membership chances. Ultimately, the conference chose not to add any more schools, after it was given permission by the NCAA to host a conference championship game with its two top teams.

=== 2021–2024 ===
==== Departure of Oklahoma and Texas ====
On July 21, 2021, the Houston Chronicle released an article stating that the Oklahoma Sooners and the Texas Longhorns reached out to the Southeastern Conference (SEC) about a potential move to the conference. The following Monday on July 26, both Oklahoma and Texas notified the Big 12 Conference that the two schools do not wish to extend its grant of television rights beyond the 2024-25 athletic year. On the following day on July 27, the two schools sent a joint letter to the SEC requesting an invitation for membership beginning July 1, 2025. On July 29, 2021, the 14 presidents and chancellors of SEC member schools voted unanimously to invite Oklahoma and Texas to join the SEC, with both schools officially accepting the next day.

The Big 12 Conference sent ESPN a cease and desist letter on July 28, claiming that the network conspired to damage the league by luring Texas and Oklahoma to the SEC. The letter alleges, "[ESPN] has taken certain actions that are intended to not only harm the Big 12 Conference but to result in financial benefits for ESPN... [Also] ESPN employees have discussed and provided incentives for at least one conference to raid 3-5 members from the Big 12. In doing so, they are prepared to reward them with future television proceeds." More specifically, media reports indicated that then-Big 12 commissioner Bob Bowlsby believed that ESPN was encouraging a raid from the American Athletic Conference, up to and including absorbing the remaining Big 12 members. ESPN released a statement stating that the claims have no merit, and officials from The American declined to comment.

Two decisions that the Big 12 made during the early-2010s realignment became significant during this development. First, the conference drafted new bylaws in 2012 with a 99-year duration. A group of members that included Oklahoma and Texas wanted the longest possible duration. Notably, the bylaws allow any member to individually sue any other entity that it sees as violating the bylaws, including other members, different conferences, or broadcast partners. This right to sue remains in force regardless of the number of Big 12 members—even if only one member is left in the conference. Second, the Big 12 registered itself as a Delaware corporation, meaning that any court cases involving the conference's internal governance will be heard in Delaware courts, rather than the courts of the conference's headquarters state of Texas. A story by CBS Sports journalist Dennis Dodd specifically pointed out that this nullifies a potential Texas advantage in any future legal proceedings.

==== New members 2023 ====
On September 3, Sports Illustrated reported that the Big 12 was on the verge of inviting four schools—American Conference members Cincinnati, Houston, and UCF, plus BYU, an FBS independent and otherwise a member of the non-football West Coast Conference (WCC). This report was soon picked up and expanded on by other outlets. All four schools were reportedly preparing membership applications, and their future entrance could be approved as early as the next scheduled meeting of Big 12 presidents on September 10. The entry timeline was uncertain at the time of the report, but would most likely be in 2024. All four schools received and accepted membership offers on the date of the presidents' meeting, with the official Big 12 announcement stating only that they would join no later than 2024–25. BYU's own announcement stated that it would join in 2023–24, presumably because the WCC had a shorter notice period for departing schools than the 27 months required under American Conference bylaws. Despite said notice period, Houston stated that it could join the Big 12 as early as 2023–24. The three schools set to depart The American entered into negotiations over their departure date, and an agreement allowing those schools to leave for the Big 12 in 2023 was announced on June 10, 2022.

==== Men's soccer ====
Another interesting situation involved the only then-current Big 12 member that sponsored men's soccer, West Virginia, which had announced it would move that sport to Conference USA (CUSA) in July 2022. Of the 14 schools that were full CUSA members in the 2021–22 school year, nine would announce their departure, including five of the nine schools that competed in CUSA men's soccer in that school year. Of the remaining five full members, only FIU sponsored men's soccer, and Liberty had the only men's soccer program among the four schools that eventually joined CUSA in 2023. Affiliate member Coastal Carolina was set to depart once its full-time home of the Sun Belt Conference (SBC) reinstated men's soccer, which at that time was expected for 2023. With the CUSA men's soccer league also including Kentucky and South Carolina, the only two SEC members that sponsor the sport, this gave three Power Five schools effective control over CUSA men's soccer.

Later developments in the SBC dramatically changed this scenario. The first involved James Madison, a Colonial Athletic Association (Note: Since renamed the Coastal Athletic Association.) member that sponsors men's soccer and announced its plan to move to the SBC in 2023. The CAA barred JMU from participation in any further conference championship events, invoking a provision in its then-current bylaws that allowed such a ban. (Note: Although the 2021 football season was still ongoing at the time, James Madison remained eligible for (and ultimately shared) the CAA football title. The CAA football league, branded as CAA Football, is a separate legal entity from the all-sports CAA, and the CAA Football bylaws lacked a similar rule.) (Note: The all-sports CAA has since changed its bylaws on this point. In 2024, Delaware announced it would leave both sides of the CAA to join CUSA in 2025. It will remain eligible for CAA championship events until actually leaving the conference.) The SBC responded by moving JMU's arrival date forward to July 2022. Soon after this, the other three CUSA members set to move to the SBC in 2023 (Marshall, Old Dominion, and Southern Miss, with Marshall and ODU sponsoring men's soccer) announced that they would instead leave in 2022. Following a brief legal dispute, CUSA and the three schools reached a settlement that allowed those schools to join the SBC in 2022. With three men's soccer schools now joining in 2022 instead of 2023, the SBC announced it would reinstate men's soccer at that time. Kentucky, South Carolina, and West Virginia moved men's soccer into the revived SBC league. UCF would join SBC men's soccer upon its 2023 arrival in the Big 12.

==== Discussions with Gonzaga ====
On November 2, 2022, ESPN reported that Gonzaga University athletic director Chris Standiford had met with Big 12 commissioner Brett Yormark (who succeeded Bob Bowlsby after the latter's retirement earlier in 2022) while the Gonzaga men's basketball team was in the Dallas area, home to the Big 12 offices, for a scrimmage with Tennessee. This meeting was reportedly part of discussions regarding a possible Gonzaga move to the Big 12 as a full member without football (Gonzaga has not had a football program since 1941). Gonzaga men's basketball has become by far the dominant program in the otherwise mid-major WCC. Going into the 2022–23 season, the Bulldogs had played in every NCAA men's tournament in the 21st century, made national championship games in 2017 and 2021, and had been a top regional seed in four of the previous five NCAA tournaments. Gonzaga, which was transparent with the WCC about its talks with other conferences, was also reportedly in membership discussions with the Pac-12 Conference and the Big East Conference (the latter being a non-football league).

Yormark later confirmed that the conference had discussed potential membership not only with Gonzaga, but with UConn, an FBS independent and otherwise a Big East member. The Big 12 shelved these discussions after announcing the addition of four new members from the Pac-12. However, this was not the end of discussions with Gonzaga. In October 2023, The Messenger reported that the Big 12 and Gonzaga had "resumed top-level discussions" regarding a potential move to the conference. Although the Big 12 was dealing with financial and logistical issues surrounding the conference's 2023 and 2024 expansions, the conference presidents and chancellors authorized Yormark to continue discussions with Gonzaga. These later discussions soon ended, and Gonzaga would eventually accept an invitation to the Pac-12 effective in 2026 as part of that conference's rebuilding after its 2024 collapse.

==== Settlement with Oklahoma and Texas ====
The Big 12 announced on February 9, 2023 that it had reached a buyout agreement with Oklahoma and Texas. This allowed the two schools to leave for the SEC in 2024 instead of the original 2025 schedule.

==== New members in 2024 ====
After the University of Southern California and University of California, Los Angeles announced they would leave the Pac-12 Conference for the Big Ten Conference on June 30, 2022, speculation emerged over whether Pac-12 members would join the Big 12. In particular, following the inability of the Pac-12 to secure a new media deal, speculation emerged that Arizona and former Big 12 member Colorado would join the Big 12. On July 26, 2023, the presidents and chancellors of the Big 12 member universities voted unanimously to admit Colorado as a member. On July 27, 2023, Colorado's regents approved a resolution on rejoining the Big 12. That same day, Colorado announced it would rejoin the Big 12 effective July 1, 2024. Following Colorado's departure from the Pac-12, the Pac-12 universities' chancellors and presidents met on August 1 where they were presented with details on a new media deal. This did not satisfy the other schools in the conference and on August 4, 2023, the Pac-12's other three members in the Four Corners states—Arizona, Arizona State, and Utah—announced they would follow Colorado in departing the Pac-12 to join the Big 12 beginning in the 2024–25 academic year.

==== New sports for 2024–25 ====
In November 2023, the Big 12 announced it would add two women's sports for 2024–25 and beyond—beach volleyball and lacrosse. At the time, the Big 12 had only one member that sponsored each sport—Cincinnati in women's lacrosse and TCU in beach volleyball. However, each of the incoming members for 2024 sponsored at least one of the two sports. Arizona and Utah sponsored beach volleyball, Colorado sponsored women's lacrosse, and Arizona State sponsored both. The conference press release stated that new members would be added in both sports to enable automatic qualification for NCAA tournaments. This came about for lacrosse on February 21, 2024, with the Big 12 adding Florida, San Diego State, and UC Davis as affiliates for the conference's first season. At the time, Florida played women's lacrosse in The American, and the two California schools played that sport in the Pac-12. Also on February 21, the Big 12 announced that Old Dominion and Tulsa, both then housing women's rowing in The American (Old Dominion as an affiliate and Tulsa as a full member), would join the Big 12 for women's rowing in 2024–25. The Big 12 announcement hinted at the departure of women's rowing associates and full SEC members Alabama and Tennessee, neither of which was included in the list of Big 12 rowing members for 2024–25. SEC bylaws allow it to hold a championship in any sport sponsored by at least 25% of the full membership. In July 2024, Alabama and Tennessee were joined in the SEC by Oklahoma and Texas, both of which sponsor the sport, and the SEC announced the addition of rowing with the four aforementioned programs on August 23.
