= Mi St Univ =

Mi St Univ can be an abbreviation for:

- Michigan State University
- Minnesota State University, Mankato
- Minnesota State University, Moorhead
