= Jonathan Twingley =

American artist, illustrator and author

Jonathan Twingley is an American artist, illustrator and author. His paintings and illustrations have appeared in The New York Times, The Washington Post, The Los Angeles Times, The Wall Street Journal, The Atlantic Monthly, The New Republic, Mother Jones, and The Progressive.

Twingley's first novel, The Badlands Saloon, was published by Scribner in 2009.

== Early life ==
Twingley was born in Bismarck, North Dakota. His mother was a librarian. His father was an artist and high school arts instructor. Twingley's primary and high school education occurred in his home town of Bismarck. He earned his Bachelor of Fine Arts degree from Minnesota State University Moorhead in 1996, and completed his Master of Fine Arts (MFA) in illustration at the School of Visual Arts (SVA) in New York City.

== Illustrator ==
As an illustrator, Twingley's work has appeared in the New York Times, Atlantic Monthly, Los Angeles Times, The Nation, and The New Republic. In addition, Twingley has been commissioned by the Columbia Journalism Review, Boston Magazine, and trade magazine publishers such as Corporate Counsel, The Deal, The Chronicle of Higher Education, and Re-Thinking Schools.

According to a contributing writer for High Plains Reader, Twingley's illustrations show a profound awareness of character − pertaining to people and places alike, he arranges his compositions in a careful manner, like a cinematographer, paying close attention to narrative elements that individualize each separate work.

PRINT magazine featured Twingley's work in a showcase of 20 artists under the age of 30. His work has also been recognized by the Society of Illustrators, American Illustration, the Society of Publication Designers, and Communication Arts Magazine.

== The Badlands Saloon ==
After working for over 10 years creating illustrations featured in books, magazines, trade journals and newspapers, Twingley wrote and illustrated The Badlands Saloon, his debut novel. Published by Scribner in 2009, the 224-page hardcover includes 38 full-color illustrations covering 76 pages. It tells the story of Oliver Clay, and his life-changing summer in a small North Dakota town.

Booklist called Twingley as "an up-and-coming artist" and praised his "uniquely stylized characters...a gallery of portraits rendered in prose, punctuated by visuals, and delivered with unsentimental but heartfelt honesty."

== Arts education ==
Twingley holds a teaching position as senior lecturer at the University of the Arts (Philadelphia).

He also served as visiting artist-in-residence at Minnesota State University Moorhead, where he met individually with students, lectured on art and writing, and illustrated these with selections from his own work.

In 2012, Twingley juried the Rourke Art Museum's 53rd annual Midwestern exhibit.
