= Roland Dille =

President of Minnesota State University Moorhead

- Born: Roland Paul Dille; September 16, 1924; Dassel, Minnesota
- Died: May 26, 2014 (aged 89)
- Occupations: Academic; President of Minnesota State University Moorhead

Roland Paul Dille (September 16, 1924 – May 26, 2014) was an American academic. He was president of Minnesota State University Moorhead (MSUM) from 1968 to 1994.

== Biography ==
Dille was born on a farm near Dassel, Minnesota. He took a bachelor's degree in English Literature at the University of Minnesota. While serving in the Army during World War II he was awarded the Bronze Star. After military service, he earned a doctorate from Minnesota in 1962, with a thesis "David Garnett and the Bloomsbury group".

== Career ==
From 1956 to 1961 he taught at St. Olaf College in Northfield, then at California Lutheran College, and finally came to Moorhead in 1963. He was dean of academic affairs there from 1966, and president from 1968. He retired in 1994.

== Honors ==
- Member, National Council for the Humanities
- President of the American Association of State Colleges and Universities
- Acting chancellor of the Minnesota State University System
