= Mark Mostert =

Mark P. Mostert
- Born: Johannesburg, South Africa
- Education: Johannesburg College of Education
- Occupation: Professor at Regent University
- Notable work: Useless Eaters

Mark P. Mostert is co-director of the Institute for Disability and Bioethics and professor of Special Education at Regent University, Virginia Beach. He has written about and lectured on Eugenics and Euthanasia, Nazi Germany's state-sanctioned "useless eater" policy to exterminate people with disabilities and others considered less than human, and the fads and pseudoscientific practices found in special education.

== Education ==
Mostert grew up in Johannesburg, South Africa. He attended the Johannesburg College of Education (now the University of Witwatersrand) where he studied special education and biblical studies. He earned an H.E.D. in Special Education in 1976. Mostert went on to earn a M.Ed. in Special Education (1985), from the University of South Alabama, Mobile, Alabama and a Ph.D. in Special Education and Teacher Education (1992) from the University of Virginia, Charlottesville, VA. His dissertation, published by the University of Illinois, was entitled Metaphor in Special Educators' Language of Practice.

== Career ==
In 1977, Mostert became a teacher at Highveld Elementary School in Johannesburg, South Africa. He also taught at Mondeor High School in Johannesburg before moving to Alabama for graduate school.

From 1985 to 1986, Mostert was a special education teacher at Old Dauphin Way School in Mobile, Alabama.

He served as Program Director and Director of Education at the Charter Southland Hospital in Mobile, Alabama from 1986 to 1987 and served two years as principal at the St. Mark School, Mobile, Alabama before pursuing his doctorate.

In 1992, Mostert became the Program Coordinator for Programs and Licensure in Learning Disabilities at Minnesota State University Moorhead, Moorhead, Minnesota. He remained at the university, becoming associate professor, then professor of special education, until 2000.

From 2000 to 2002, Mostert served as associate professor of Special Education at Old Dominion University, Norfolk, Virginia.

He left Old Dominion University for Regent University in 2002, where he continues to serve as Director, Special Education Doctoral Cognate and Professor of Special Education.

In 2007, Mostert became Director of the Institute for the Study of Disability and Bioethics at Regent University.

== Useless eaters and assisted suicide ==
Mostert has written and spoken about ethical and policy concerns regarding assisted suicide for people with terminal illnesses or those who are otherwise medically vulnerable. Current policies in states allowing assisted suicide, according to Mostert, do not have the requisite safety policies in place (for example, no witness is required when the medicine is administered) and are open to possible abuse. His concern is people with government jobs—and not physicians—are making decisions about "treatment or the withholding of treatment". Mostert asserts that economic rationale (e.g., the cost of end-of-life care) is still subtly affecting health care policies in the United States. He compares this type of thinking and policy-making to that of the "useless eaters" program introduced in Nazi Germany which implemented a state-sanctioned action that allowed the killing of people with disabilities and others deemed as less than human.

Mostert advocates getting rid of the term "vegetative state" for people who are chronically and medically unconscious, and replacing it with "persistent, non-responsive state," which is less demeaning.

Mostert has also linked the use of Facilitated Communication (FC), with its "serious problems of validity and logic," with Nazi-era pseudoscience. He wrote in a 2001 article: "The results of these actions were extremely damaging, both practically and ethically, to many people FC was supposed to assist. The reaction[s] of many members of the public and media, who embraced FC based on the flimsiest of evidence, were hardly less astonishing."

== The Positive Side of Special Education ==
Mostert co-wrote The Positive Side of Special Education: Minimizing Its Fads, Fancies and Follies (published by R&L Education, 2004) with Kenneth Kavale. The book is an overview of practices and interventions in the field of special education that had "significant impact but lacked scientific validation". The authors explore practices that may have been started with good intentions, but were found to be based more on ideology than logic and rationality. The book offers readers insight into developing a "more scientific attitude" and become less susceptible to "fallible judgment" and pseudoscientific practices. The book is intended for those working with people with disabilities: educators, parents, undergraduate and graduate students, psychologists and the like. The Positive Side of Special Education won a 2005 Award presented by the American Library Association.

== Awards ==
- Dille Distinguished Faculty Lecturer Award, Minnesota University Moorhead (1996–1997)
- Millman Promising Scholar Award, Cornell University (inaugural winner) (1996)

== Selected articles ==
- Evaluation of Research for Usable Knowledge in Behavioral Disorders: Ignoring the Irrelevant, Considering the Germane (2001)
- Facilitated Communication Since 1995: A Review of Published Studies (2001)
- Useless Eaters: Disability as Genocidal Marker in Nazi Germany (2002)
- Meta-Analyses in Mental Retardation (2003)
- Truth and Consequences with James M. Kauffman and Kenneth A. Kavale (2003)
- Face Validity of Meta-Analyses in Emotional or Behavioral Disorders (2004)
- Social Skills Interventions for Individuals with Learning Disabilities with Kenneth A. Kavale (2004)
- There is a Way to Make Ethical Decisions in the Classroom (2004)
- The Starting Point Must be the Dignity of Human Worth
- Facilitated Communication and Its Legitimacy - Twenty-First Century Developments (2010)
- Facilitated Communication: The Empirical Imperative to Prevent Further Professional Malpractice (2012)
- An Activist Approach to Debunking FC (2014)

== Books ==
- Challenging the Refusal of Reasoning in Special Education with Kenneth A. Kavale and James M. Kauffman ISBN 978-0-891-08329-0
- Interprofessional Collaboration in Schools: Practical Action in the Classroom ISBN 978-0-205-16689-3
- Managing Classroom Behaviors: A Reflective Case-Based Approach (5th Edition) with James M. Kauffman, Patricia L. Pullen, and Stanley C. Trent ISBN 978-0-137-05679-8
- The Positive Side of Special Education: Minimizing Its Fads, Fancies, and Follies with Kenneth A. Kavale ISBN 978-1-578-86097-5
