= The Badlands Saloon =

2009 novel by Jonathan Twingley

- Author: Jonathan Twingley
- Language: English
- Genre: Illustrated novel
- Publisher: Scribners
- Publication date: 2009
- Publication place: United States
- Media type: Print (Hardcover)
- ISBN: 978-1-4165-8706-4

The Badlands Saloon is a novel by Jonathan Twingley, an American artist and illustrator. Published by Scribner in 2009, the 224-page hardcover tells the story of Oliver Clay, and his life-changing summer in a small North Dakota town.

== Setting ==
The town is Marysville − once a booming oil town, now a tourist spot − a "Wild West fishbowl" with a state-of-the-art amphitheater, an Old West Shooting Gallery, bumper cars, and a glad-handing mayor with his own daily radio show.

== Style ==
The novel includes 38 full-color illustrations covering 76 pages.

== Critical reception ==
The New York Times Book Review stated "The Badlands Saloon is filled with hallucinatory incidents and flamboyant barflies...Before the summer’s out, young Ollie will learn the usual life lessons, amid much faux wisdom that crumbles under the glare of the trailer park lights. The book’s chief attraction is Twingley’s sketchbook of illustrations, whose broad outsider-art strokes work in concert with Ollie’s naive ruminations."

Booklist called Twingley "an up-and-coming artist" and praised his "uniquely stylized characters...a gallery of portraits rendered in prose, punctuated by visuals, and delivered with unsentimental but heartfelt honesty."

According to Library Journal Review, The Badlands Saloon "feels like catching up with an old friend over beers. A wonderful read; highly recommended for lovers of the American landscape and fiction readers of all kinds."
