= Douglas Medin =

American psychologist

Douglas L. Medin
- Born: June 13, 1944 (age 82)
- Education: Moorhead State College, University of South Dakota
- Spouse: Linda Powers
- Awards: Member of the American Academy of Arts and Sciences and of the National Academy of Sciences
- Scientific career
- Fields: Psychology
- Workplaces: Northwestern University
- Thesis: Form perception and pattern reproduction by monkeys (1968)
- Doctoral advisor: Roger Davis

Douglas L. "Doug" Medin (born June 13, 1944) is the Louis W. Menk Professor Emeritus of Psychology at Northwestern University in Evanston, Illinois. He is also Professor Emeritus of Education and Social Policy.

== Early life and education ==
Medin first became interested in psychology when he was an eighth-grader in Algona, Iowa. During this time, he and his classmates were sorted into two groups depending on their singing abilities; Medin was assigned to the non-singers' group. He attended Moorhead State College, graduating in 1965 with a B.A. in psychology, and went on to receive his M.A. and Ph.D. in psychology from the University of South Dakota in 1966 and 1968, respectively. His Ph.D. thesis focused on the way that rhesus monkeys perceive shapes.

== Career ==
Medin joined Rockefeller University in 1968 as a postdoctoral fellow, where he became an assistant professor the following year. He remained at Rockefeller until 1978, when he joined the University of Illinois as an associate professor. He joined the faculty of the University of Michigan in 1989, and remained there for three years until joining the faculty of Northwestern University in 1992, because it "held better professional opportunities for his wife, Linda Powers," according to a profile of Medin in the Proceedings of the National Academy of Sciences.

== Research ==
Medin is best known for his research on concepts and categorization. He was the first to propose an exemplar model of category learning as an alternative to prototype theory. People were able to learn to classify shapes without the need for the classes to be based on similarity to a central example. With Gregory Murphy, Medin was also responsible for a seminal paper outlining the need for psychological models of concepts to incorporate their role in theories and understanding. Concepts are more than simple ways to classify the world, as proposed by exemplar and prototype models at the time.

He has also studied the "role of expertise and culture in the conceptual organization of biological categories." His later research has been focussed on cross-cultural studies of concepts

== Honors and awards ==
Medin was inducted into the American Academy of Arts and Sciences in 2002, and into the National Academy of Sciences in 2005.
