= Brett Yormark =

American athletics director

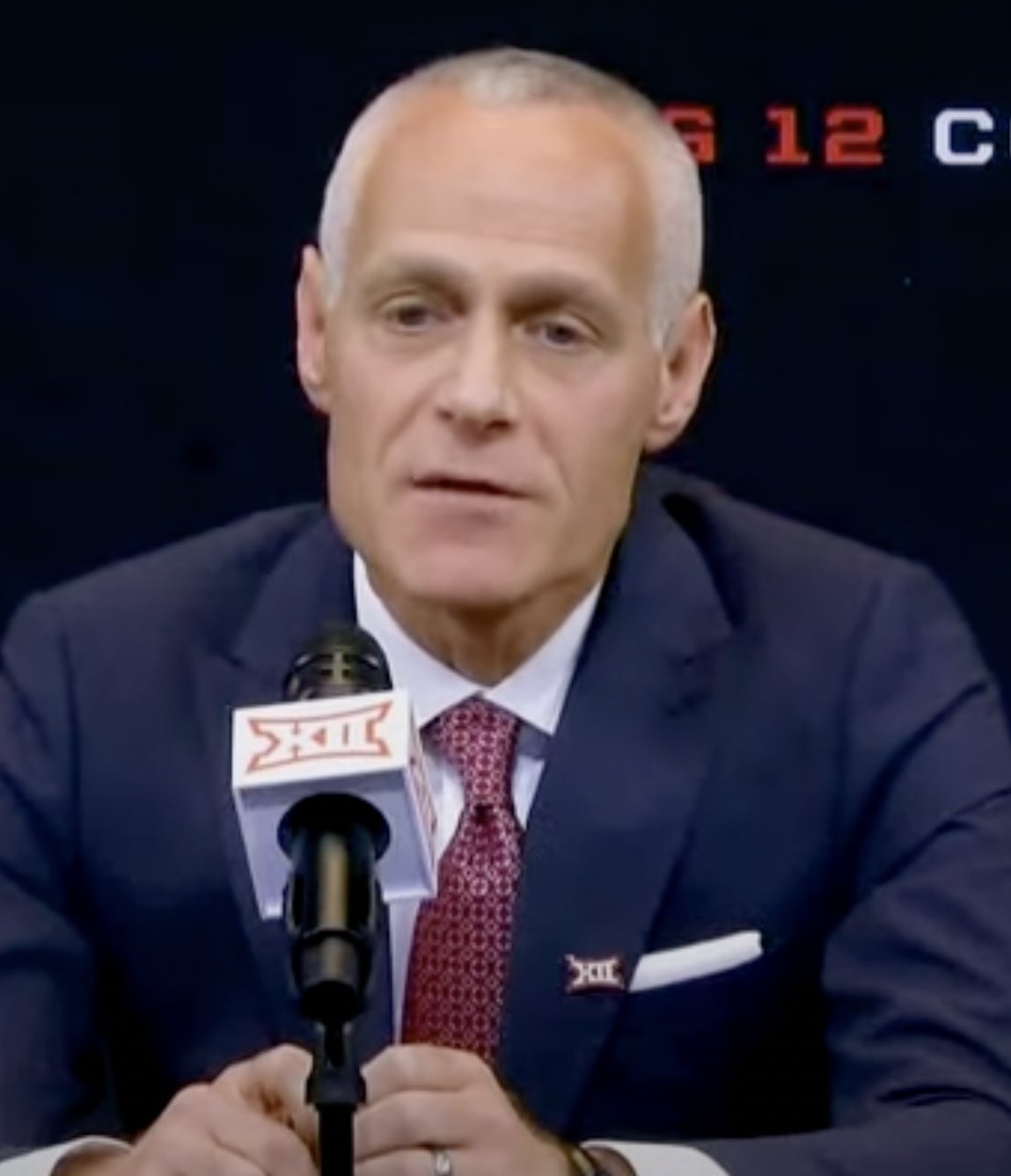
- Yormark in 2022
- Born: Brett Yormark; September 28, 1966 (age 60); Springfield Township, New Jersey, U.S.
- Citizenship: American
- Education: Indiana University Bloomington
- Occupation: Commissioner of the Big 12 Conference
- Predecessor: Bob Bowlsby

Brett Yormark (born September 28, 1966) is the fifth and current commissioner of the Big 12 Conference, a position he has held since August 1, 2022. He has held top positions at Katz Sports, NASCAR, Palace Sports & Entertainment, Brooklyn Sports & Entertainment, and the National Basketball Association. He served as the chief executive officer of Brooklyn Sports & Entertainment, where he oversaw the business operations of the Brooklyn Nets organization, Barclays Center, the New York Islanders, New York Liberty, Nassau Coliseum, and the Nets' minor team Long Island Nets. He then became the chief executive officer of Roc Nation.

== Career ==
Yormark started his career by selling TV time to Upper Midwest sports teams at Katz Sports in New York, including the Milwaukee Brewers, Milwaukee Bucks, Minnesota Timberwolves, and Minnesota Twins.

Yormark then moved on to Palace Sports and Entertainment as a senior account executive. In 1998, he became NASCAR's director of corporate marketing, opening an office in New York. He then became vice president of corporate marketing and helped successfully negotiate the sponsorship deal with Nextel Communications which, at the time, was NASCAR's largest contract.

In 2005, then-Nets' owner Bruce Ratner hired Yormark as the team's CEO to help transform them into a world-class organization as a more popular, modern, and contemporary brand. Yormark helped the franchise transition from New Jersey to Brooklyn, and led the marketing and operations functions of Barclays Center, which opened in 2012. Yormark spent 14 years with the organization as CEO of Brooklyn Sports Entertainment, negotiating deals for the Center that included the New York Islanders, Ultimate Fighting Championship, NCAA Division I men's basketball tournament, SportsNet New York, ACC men's basketball tournament, and the Atlantic 10 men's basketball tournament. Barclays Center placed in the top ten of all entertainment venues world-wide for ticket sales every year under his leadership.

Yormark left the Nets in 2019, and was soon hired by Jay-Z to become Roc Nation's CEO and President of Business Operations and Strategy. While at Roc Nation, Yormark helped negotiate a long-term agreement with the NFL for Roc Nation to serve as the official live music entertainment for events such as the Super Bowl.

On August 1, 2022, Yormark left Roc Nation to become the commissioner of the Big 12 Conference. Three months later he finalized a new media rights agreement for the Big 12 Conference with partners ESPN and Fox Sports.

== Personal life ==
Yormark grew up in Springfield and Morristown, New Jersey. He was born to a Jewish family. He graduated with an undergraduate degree in business from Kelley School of Business at Indiana University Bloomington in 1988.

He has two children and is married to Elaina Scotto. His twin brother, Michael Yormark, is also a business and sports entertainment executive.

== Achievements ==
Yormark was named in Crain's New York Business 40 under Forty in 2000 and 2006 as well as in Sports Business Journal's 40 under 40 in 2006. He was also nominated as the Sports Executive of the Year by Sports Business Journal in 2024.
