= Flora Frick =

American physical educator (1889–1957)

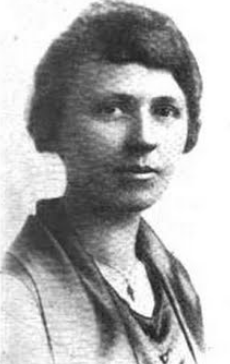
- Flora M. Frick, from a 1920 publication
- Born: Flora Margaret Frick; March 13, 1889; Indianapolis, Indiana
- Died: April 1957; Moorhead, Minnesota
- Occupation(s): Physical educator, college professor, playwright

Flora Margaret Frick (March 13, 1889 – April 1957) was an American physical educator, playwright, and college professor. She was chair of the women's physical education department at Moorhead State Teachers College for 38 years, from 1919 to her death in 1957. A building on the campus is named Flora Frick Hall in her memory.

== Early life and education ==
Frick was born in Indianapolis, Indiana, the daughter of Philip J. Frick and Bertha Wachstetter Frick. She graduated from Butler College in 1911, and earned a master's degree at Northwestern University. She also attended the University of Wisconsin and Columbia University.

== Career ==
Frick taught drama and physical education in the Indianapolis public schools as a young woman. She began teaching physical education and German classes at Moorhead State Teachers College (now Minnesota State University Moorhead) in 1919. She chaired the women's physical education department for 38 years and is credited as naming the school's teams "the Dragons" after a 1930 fire on campus. She and Jessie McKellar were the physical education department's core faculty for four decades.

Frick also wrote and directed plays and pageants, including five pageants for the Illinois centennial. She was a Camp Fire Girls leader. She was chair of the First Aid Program of the American Red Cross chapter in Clay County for 25 years.

== Publications ==
- Stunts for Winter (seasonal plays)
- Stunts for Fall (seasonal plays)
- Stunts for Summer (season plays)
- "Pageantry in Rural Communities" (1920)
- "Children's Right to a Playground" (1920)
- "Lest We Forget: A Pageant for the Pilgrims Tercentenary" (1920)
- Christmas Windows (1928, one-act play, with Mayme Christensen)

== Personal life and legacy ==
Frick's widowed father lived with her before his death in 1943. She died in 1957, at the age of 68, in Moorhead, Minnesota. In 1962, the women's physical education building at Minnesota State was named Flora Frick Hall; the name remains as of 2023, but the building's pool and gymnasium have since been converted to other purposes. Frick was posthumously inducted into the MSU Moorhead Athletics Hall of Fame in 1983.
