= Minnesota State University Moorhead =

Public university in Moorhead, Minnesota, US

Coordinates: 46.8663522°N 96.7620251°W

- Former names: Moorhead Normal School (1888–1921); Moorhead State Teachers College (1921–1957); Moorhead State College (1957–1975); Moorhead State University (1975–2000)
- Motto: Sacrifice, Service, Loyalty
- Type: Public university
- Established: 1887; 139 years ago
- Academic affiliations: Minnesota State system
- Endowment: $42 million (2025)
- Budget: $111 million (2025)
- President: Timothy Downs
- Provost: Arrick Jackson
- Administrative staff: 751
- Students: 4,679
- Location: Moorhead, Minnesota, U.S.
- Campus: Suburban 140 acres (57 ha)
- Colors: Red, White, and Grey
- Nickname: Dragons
- Sporting affiliations: NCAA Division II – NSIC
- Website: mnstate.edu

Minnesota State University Moorhead (MSUM) is a public university in Moorhead, Minnesota, United States. It has an enrollment of 4,679 students as of 2023 and 266 full-time faculty members. MSUM is a part of the Minnesota State Colleges and Universities system.

== History ==
The plans for what would become MSUM were laid down in 1885, when the Minnesota State Legislature passed a bill declaring the need for a new state normal school in the Red River Valley, with an eye on Moorhead. The State Senator who proposed the bill, State Senator Solomon Comstock, donated 6 acres (2.4 ha) and appropriated the funds that would go to form "Moorhead Normal School", which opened in 1888. In 1921, the State authorized the school to offer the four-year Bachelor of Science degree in education in order to satisfy the need for high school teachers in northwest Minnesota, and the school became "Moorhead State Teachers College".

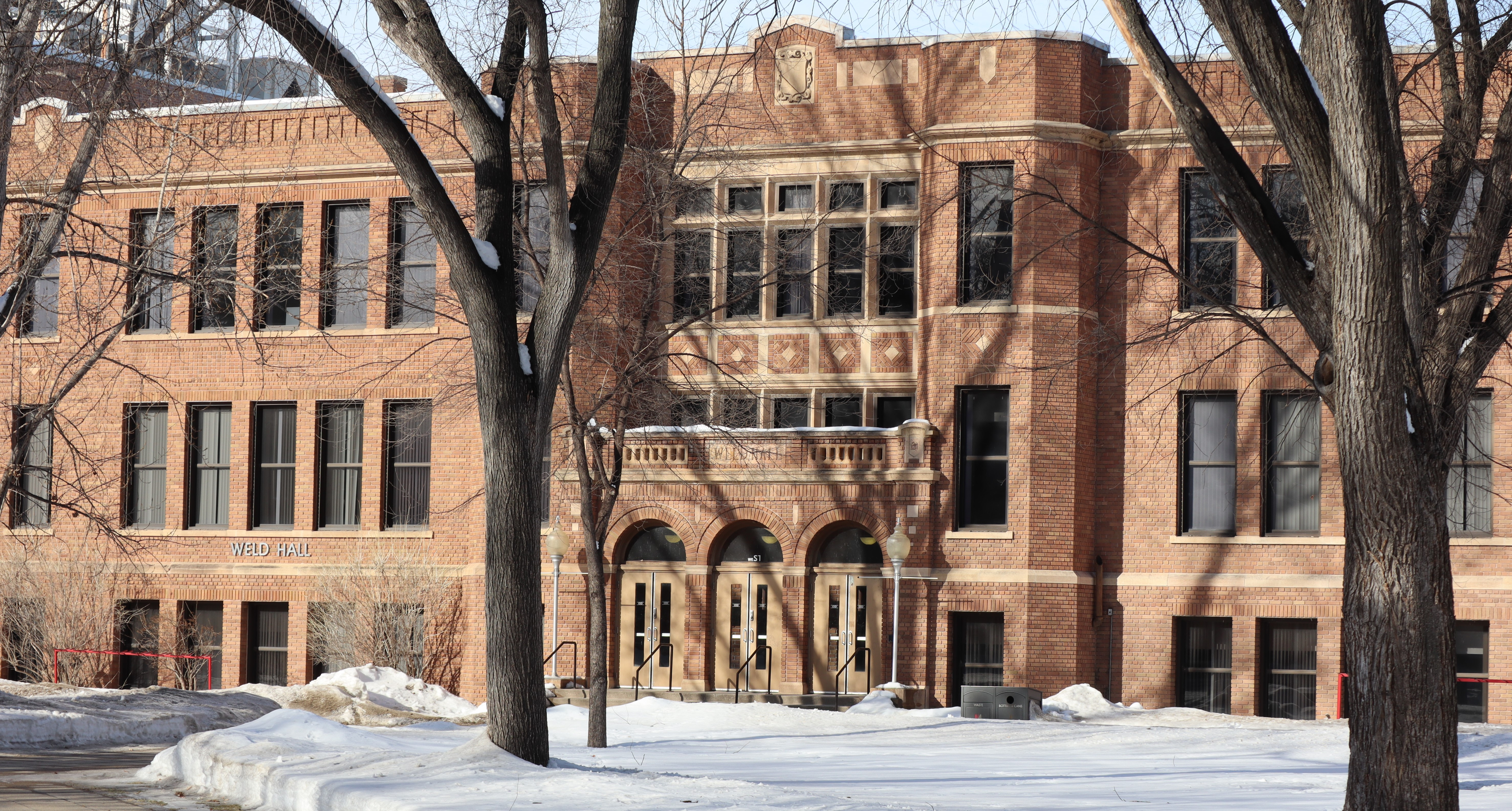
Weld Hall, the oldest building on campus, built in 1915

With the entrance of World War II, the college entered into a contract with the Army Air Corps to train aviation students. After World War II, enrollment swelled to more than 700 students and the school diversified and broadened into both a liberal arts and professional curriculum. The school began offering a Bachelor of Arts degree in 1946 and graduate programs by 1953. As a result of the broadened offerings, by 1957 the name was changed to "Moorhead State College". In 1969, the school joined a cooperative cross-registration exchange with neighboring Concordia College and North Dakota State University, creating the Tri-College University (Replaced by the Metro College Alliance in 2025). The school continued to increase its number of programs and by 1975, the State Legislature that year granted the school university status under the name "Moorhead State University". In 1995, Moorhead State became part of the Minnesota State Colleges and Universities system. On July 1, 2000, the school was renamed Minnesota State University Moorhead via a request sent to the board of trustees of the system.

Minnesota State University Moorhead was rated the 18th top liberal arts college in the midwest by TIME magazine in 2008.

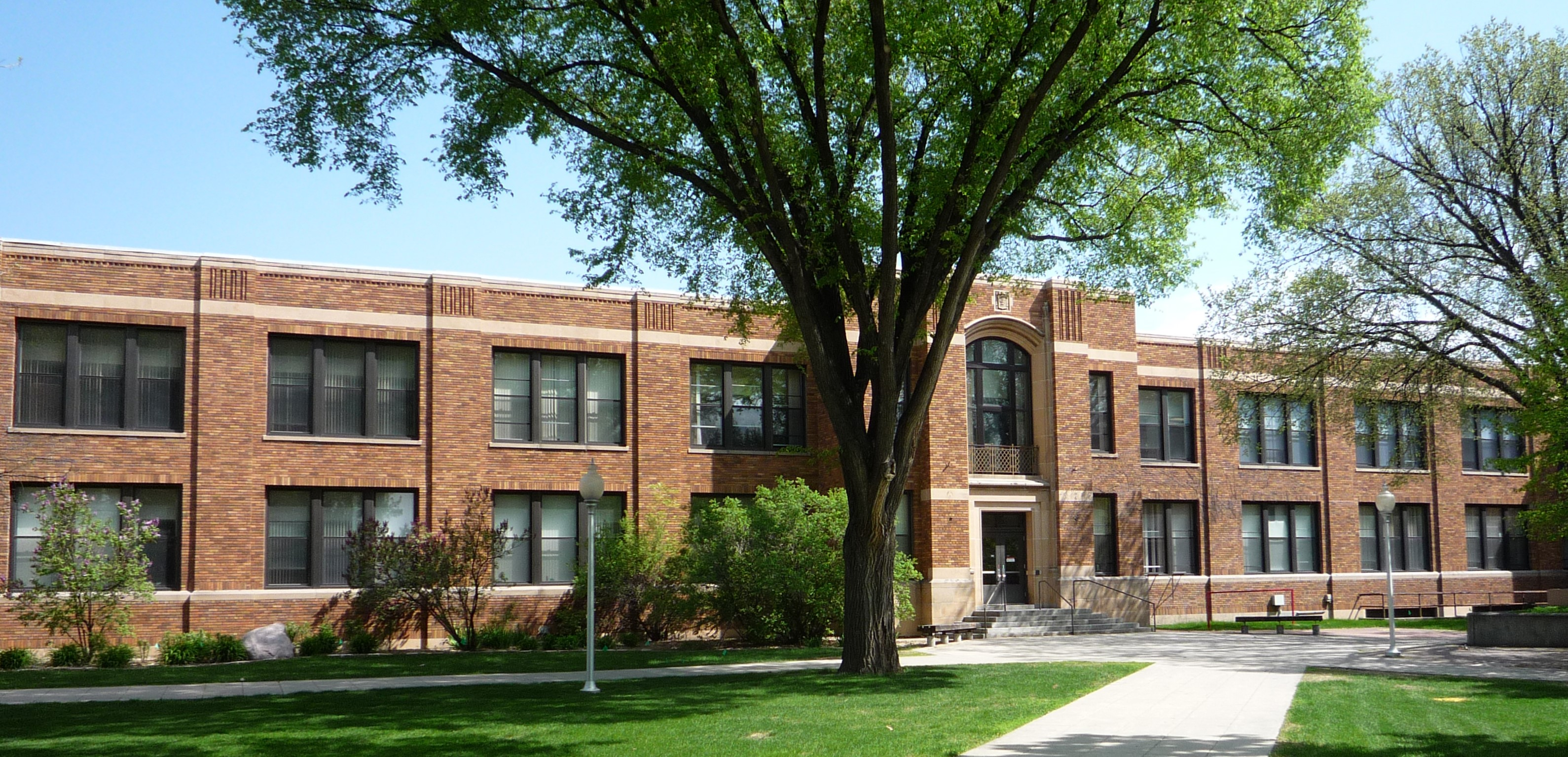
Lommen Hall, which houses education departments

The school has gone through many names changes with Moorhead Normal School (1887), Moorhead State Teachers College (1921), Moorhead State College (1957), Moorhead State University (1975) and finally Minnesota State University Moorhead (2000).

=== Presidents ===
- 1888–1899 Livingston C. Lord
- 1899–1919 Frank A. Weld
- 1919–1923 Oliver Dickerson
- 1923–1941 Ray MacLean
- 1941–1955 Otto W. Snarr
- 1955–1958 A.L. Knoblauch
- 1958–1968 John Neumaier
- 1968–1994 Roland Dille
- 1994–2008 Roland Barden
- 2008–2014 Edna Mora Szymanski
- 2014–2023 Anne E. Blackhurst
- 2023–Present Timothy Downs

== Academics ==
Academic rankings

Master's
- Washington Monthly: 328

Regional
- U.S. News & World Report: 115

National
- Forbes: RNP

MSUM offers 76 undergraduate majors with 99 emphases and 14 graduate degree programs. They are organized into five colleges: the College of Arts, Media and Communication; the College of Business and Innovation; the College of Education and Human Services; the College of Humanities and Social Sciences; and the College of Science, Health and the Environment.

MSUM is accredited by 14 national accrediting and certification agencies, including the Higher Learning Commission. The MSUM School of Business is fully accredited by the Association to Advance Collegiate Schools of Business International (AACSB). The nursing program is accredited at both the baccalaureate (BSN) and master's (MS in nursing) levels by the Commission on Collegiate Nursing Education (CCNE). Other programs that are accredited include speech, language and hearing sciences; athletic training; and teacher education.

MSUM also collaborates with Concordia College, North Dakota State University, North Dakota State College of Science, and Minnesota State Community and Technical College on a Tri-College University program that offers students the chance to take courses between the five campuses that can be credited toward their degree.

== Publications ==
MSUM operates the New Rivers Press, a nonprofit literary press founded in 1968.

The campus newspaper is The Advocate, formerlyThe MiSTiC. The MiSTiC was closed by university administration in 1970.

The school also publishes a literary magazine, Red Weather, with the support of the English Department. The yearly publication is a journal of prose, poetry, interviews, photography and art by current undergraduates and graduate students, faculty, staff, and alumni.

Students produce a weekly open-submission literary journal entitled The Yellow Bicycle, a collection of poetry, prose, essays, and reviews.

MSUM produces a daily faculty/staff email newsletter called Dragon Digest and a twice a year publication for its alumni and friends titled Moorhead Magazine.

The Interactive Journal of Global Leadership and Learning (IJGLL), a blind peer-reviewed open access scientific journal, is published twice a year by the Department of Leadership and Learning in the College of Education and Human Services. The IJGLL focuses on original research in areas related to P-12, post-secondary, and community education.

== Dragon Radio ==
The school's college radio station is KMSC, an unlicensed station which airs on AM 1500. KMSC is a student organization that has been set up to run as a Non-profit Educational radio station and serves as an in-house learning facility.

== Notable events ==
MSUM sponsors a Student Academic Conference annually. The Student Academic Conference provides student researchers from each of its colleges with the opportunity to present their work to faculty, administration, peers, and the general public in a formal academic setting. The conference was first offered in 1998.

The conference provides a formal setting for upper class students to present their research from classes required under their major. There is a possibility of the student's research being published or presented at a state, regional, or national conference. The Student Academic Conference is a great opportunity for students and MSUM to gain recognition on a larger scale. Any major or discipline can present at the conference as long as it abides by conference rules based on which forum the student chooses to present the research. There is an option to orally present using visual aids, Powerpoint, etc..., or the student can construct a poster board displaying key points and results to be presented in a more informal manner taking questions and inquiries from onlookers. The conference is kicked off by a luncheon for all the participants. For some majors, presenting at the conference is mandatory in which the student presents their discipline's research from their senior seminar or thesis class.

== Athletics ==
Minnesota State University Moorhead teams participate as a member of the National Collegiate Athletic Association's NCAA Division II. The Dragons are a member of the Northern Sun Intercollegiate Conference (NSIC). The MSUM athletic teams are called the Dragons. MSUM has a wide variety of intramural sports including flag football, softball, and soccer. Club teams are also available for men's and women's rugby, men's and women's lacrosse, and baseball which compete nationally.

Men's sports include Basketball, Cross country, football, Track & field, and wrestling. Women's sports offered are Dance, Basketball, cross country, Golf, Soccer, Softball, Swimming & diving, Tennis, Track & field, and Volleyball

== Study abroad programs ==
Undergraduate demographics as of Fall 2023
| Race and ethnicity | Total |
|---|---|
| White | 78% |
| Black | 5% |
| Hispanic | 5% |
| International student | 5% |
| Two or more races | 4% |
| Asian | 2% |
| American Indian/Alaska Native | 1% |
Economic diversity
| Low-income (Note: The percentage of students who received an income-based federal Pell grant intended for low-income students.) | 29% |
| Affluent (Note: The percentage of students who are a part of the American middle class at the bare minimum.) | 71% |

MSUM maintains a large number of study abroad programs throughout the world. Programs organic to MSUM include the following:

=== Asia ===
- Nankai University in Tianjin China
- Kanda University of International Studies in Chiba Japan
- Kanto Gakuin in Yokohama Japan
- Nagoya Gakuin University in Nagoya, Aichi Japan
- Ritsumeikan Asia Pacific University in Beppu Japan
- Chung-Ang University in Seoul, South Korea
- Ming Chuan University in Taiwan

=== Australia ===
- University of the Sunshine Coast in Queensland Australia

=== Europe ===
- University of Portsmouth on England's southern coast
- Keele University located between Liverpool and Birmingham, in England
- Lincoln University located in central England
- Centre for Medieval and Renaissance Studies in Oxford, England
- Hedmark University College in southeast Norway

== Notable alumni ==
Notable Moorhead State University alumni include:

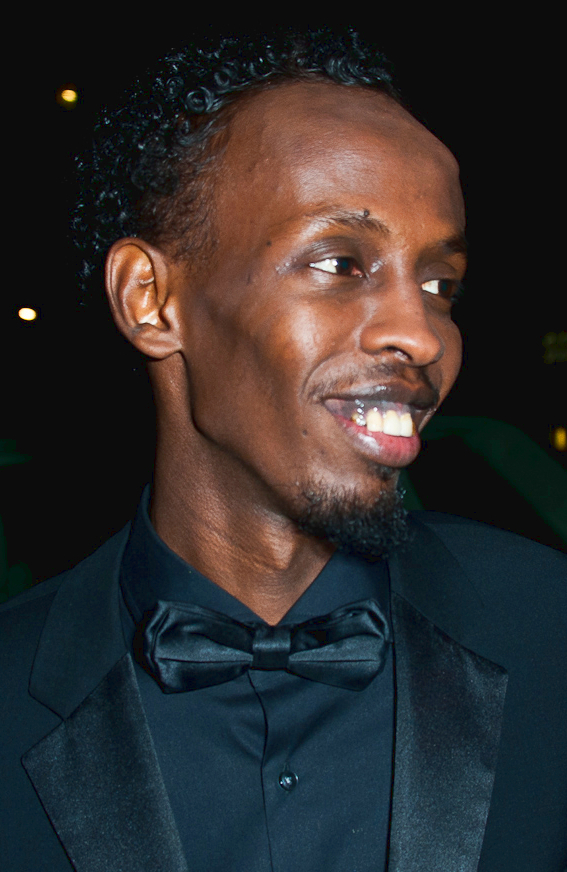
Barkhad Abdi,
B.A. 2007,
2013 Academy Award for Best Supporting Actor nominee

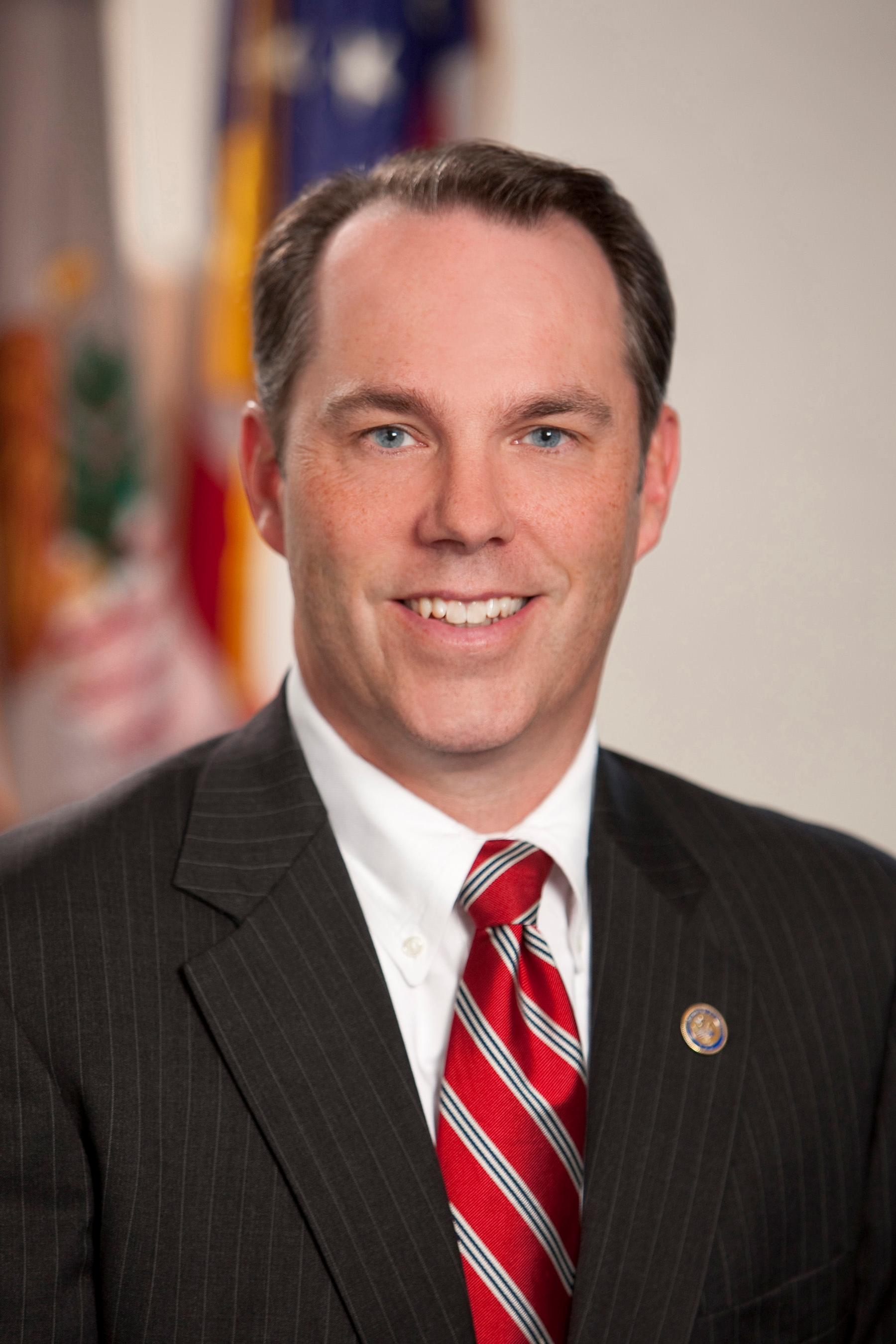
Tim Purdon,
B.A. English 1991,
United States Attorney, District of North Dakota.

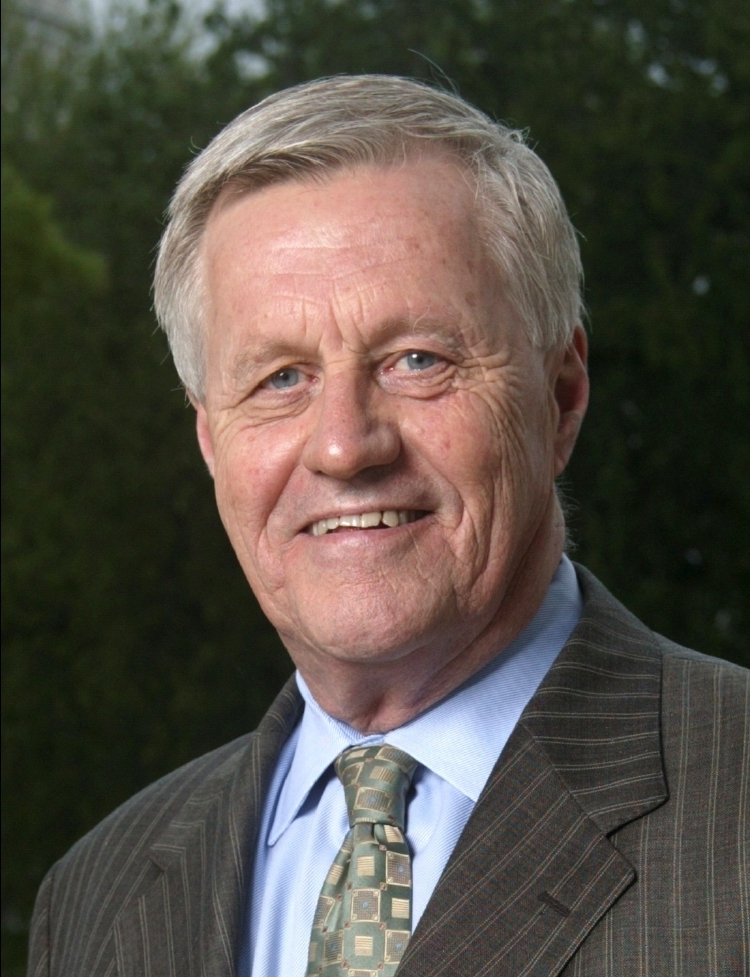
Collin Peterson,
B.A. 1964,
U.S. Representative for Minnesota's 7th congressional district,

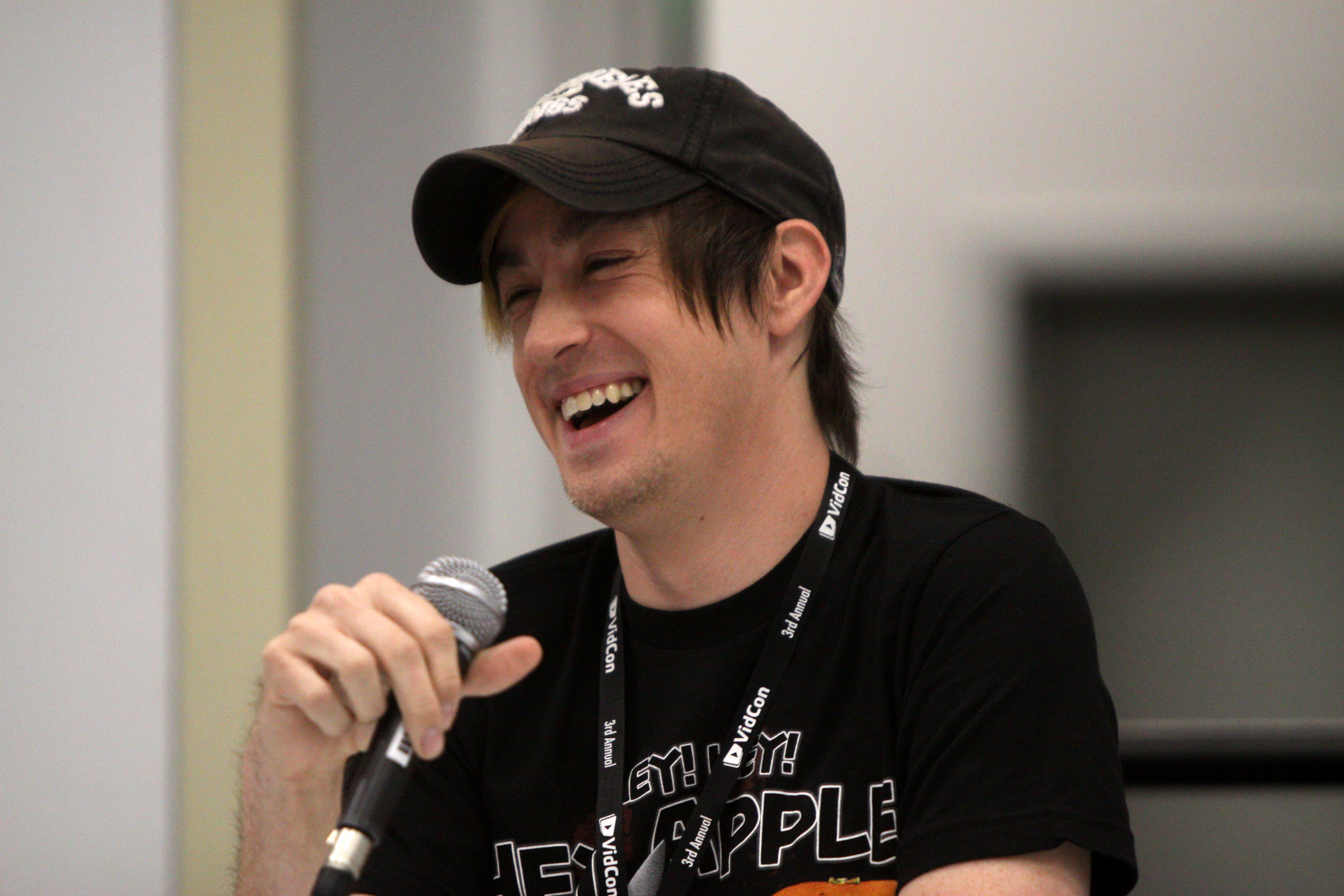
Dane Boedigheimer, B.A. 2003, Annoying Orange creator.
- Barkhad Abdi, actor, film director, and producer
- Bob Bartels, college swimmer and swim coach
- Bob Bowlsby, college athletics commissioner
- Todd Brandt, Co-host of The Todd and Tyler Radio Empire
- Leif Enger, author
- Rod Halvorson, politician in the Iowa Senate and House of Representatives
- Johnny Holm, singer
- David Joerger, professional basketball coach
- Nikita Koloff (Nelson Scott Simpson), professional wrestler
- Gary Love, Chief Risk Officer, United Nations
- Jan Maxwell, actress
- Douglas Medin, research psychologist
- Larry Munson, radio announcer for the University of Georgia Bulldogs football for forty-two years
- Collin Peterson, Congressman of Minnesota's 7th district 1991-2021
- Tim Purdon, 18th U.S. Attorney for the District of North Dakota
- Adam Quesnell, stand-up comedian
- Ed Schultz, television and radio personality
- Kevin Sorbo, (attended but did not graduate) actor
- Neal Tapio, businessman and Trump presidential campaign director for South Dakota
- Marc Trestman, professional football coach
- Chris Tuchscherer – wrestler and mixed martial artist
- Jonathan Twingley, artist, illustrator, and author
- Jerry verDorn, actor
- Patrick Volkerding, founder of Slackware Linux distribution

== Notable faculty ==
- Roland Dille (1924–2014), Professor of English, Dean of Academic Affairs, then President for 26 years
- Flora Frick (1889–1957), head of women's physical education department from 1919 to 1957
- David Mason (b. 1954), Poet & writer
- Sliv Nemzek (1895–1958), head football and basketball coach
- Thomas McGrath (1916–1990), Poet, Rhodes scholar, and Professor of English
- Mark Mostert (1992–2000) Program Coordinator for Programs and Licensure in Learning Disabilities
- James Wright (1927–1980), Poet

== See also ==
- List of colleges and universities in Minnesota
- Higher education in Minnesota
