= Bob Bowlsby =

American college athletics administrator

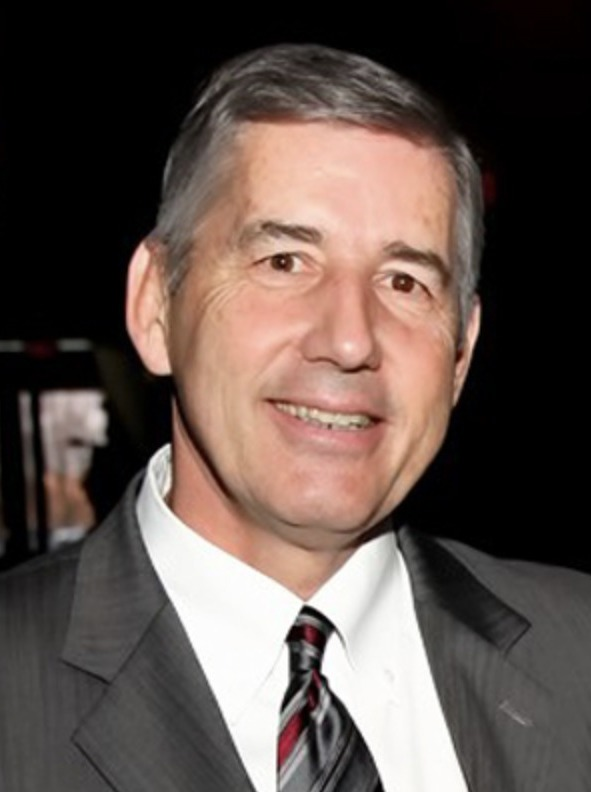
- Born: Robert Addison Bowlsby; January 10, 1952 (age 74); Waterloo, Iowa, U.S.
- Education: Moorhead State University; University of Iowa
- Predecessor: Dan Beebe
- Spouse: Candice Bowlsby
- Children: 4

Robert Addison Bowlsby (born January 10, 1952) is an American college athletic administrator. Bowlsby most recently was the fourth commissioner of the Big 12 Conference, a position he held from 2012 to 2022. Prior to that position, he served as the athletic director at the University of Northern Iowa, University of Iowa, and Stanford University.

== Career ==
Born in Waterloo, Iowa, Bowlsby was the AD at the University of Northern Iowa, until taking over as the athletic director at the University of Iowa from 1990 to 2006 prior to becoming Stanford's sixth athletic director in 2006. In 2012, he was hired to be commissioner of the Big 12 Conference. Bowlsby was selected as the NCAA Basketball Selection Committee Head in 2005. He was also a part of the United States Olympic Committee for the 2008 Summer Olympics in Beijing, China.

On April 5, 2022, Bowlsby announced his intention to step down as Big 12 Commissioner later in 2022. On November 29, 2023, Bowlsby was announced to be the interim AD at the University of Northern Iowa.

After his retirement, the Big 12 created the Bob Bowlsby Award in his honor. The award, voted on by Big 12 athletic directors, is presented to one men's and one women's athlete across all Big 12 sports and honors on- and off-field leadership and excellence. The Big 12 describes the award, first presented after the 2022–23 academic year, as "the Conference's most prestigious individual accolade".

== Personal life ==
Bowlsby graduated from Moorhead State University (now called Minnesota State University Moorhead) in 1975 and earned a master's degree from the University of Iowa in 1978. He is married with four children.
