= Dan Beebe =

American sports administrator

Dan Beebe (born February 27, 1957) was the commissioner of the Ohio Valley Conference from 1989 to 2003 and Big 12 Conference from 2007 to 2011.

== Early life ==
Beebe grew up in Walla Walla, Washington and played two years football at Walla Walla Community College before getting a scholarship. In 1979 he received a bachelor's degree from California State Polytechnic University, Pomona where he was team captain on their football team. In 1982 he graduated from the University of California, Hastings College of the Law.

== Southern Methodist University case ==
His first job out of school was working in enforcement of NCAA rules from 1982 to 1986. He was assistant director of athletics at Wichita State University from 1986 to 1987. In 1987 he was named director of enforcement for the NCAA with his most notable case being the imposition of the "death penalty" against Southern Methodist University in the Southern Methodist University football scandal.

From 1989 to 2003, he was commissioner of the Ohio Valley Conference.

== Big 12 ==
In 2003 he joined the Big 12 as senior associate commissioner and chief operating officer. On September 5, 2007, he was promoted to commissioner.

Beebe had a stormy experience at the Big 12 helm. The University of Nebraska–Lincoln moved to the Big Ten Conference and the University of Colorado moved to the Pac-12 Conference, both at the end of the 2010–2011 season. Then Texas A&M University and the University of Missouri announced in the fall of 2011 that they were moving to the SEC Conference at the end of the 2011–2012 season. The moves ended Missouri's and Nebraska's 100+ year relationship to the conference, and ended a 100+ year rivalry between Texas A&M and the University of Texas.

The departures of Missouri and Texas A&M had been prompted by a deal between the University of Texas and ESPN to broadcast games on the Longhorn Network, which was valued at $300 million over 25 years. The departures of Nebraska and Colorado, which had destabilized the conference the previous year, were no small factor either. Texas also said it would broadcast high school highlights (which other schools felt would put them at a disadvantage when recruiting future players) and Texas initially indicated it would not share revenue from the deal with its fellow conference members. The NCAA ruled that televising potential recruits' games would not be allowed before revenue sharing could be done. Texas had been talking about such an arrangement since 2007.

After some schools, in particular the University of Oklahoma and its president David Boren, urged Beebe's ouster for not doing enough to address schools' concerns, he was ousted on September 23, 2011.

Beebe said that he had proposed equal revenue distribution in the conference as early as 2008 but that the conference had not voted on it. Further he noted he had negotiated a 13-year $1 billion deal with Fox Sports.
