= Stephen W. Perkins =

American politician

Stephen W. Perkins (c. 1809—after 1869) was an American political figure in the Republic of Texas and early statehood Texas who, in 1846–47, served as Speaker of the Texas House of Representatives during the First Texas Legislature.

A native of Kentucky, Perkins moved in 1840 to Texas' Brazoria County, where he founded a plantation in the village of Bailey's Prairie. In 1844 he was elected to the Texas House in the Ninth Congress of the Republic of Texas. Perkins was on the committee charged to write an "Address to the People of Texas" in regard to annexation.

After the annexation of Texas, Perkins was elected to the House of Representatives of the First Texas Legislature, and to the Senate of the Second Legislature. During his time in the House, Perkins was elected Speaker after the resignation of William H. Bourland.

After fulfilling his legislative duties, Perkins served as chief justice of Brazoria County from 1850 until 1862. In that year, at the age of 53, with the Civil War at full momentum, he reported as a private in the Brazoria Volunteers of the Rio Grande Regiment, a home guard company. In 1866 he was re-elected to his former judicial post in Brazoria County, but the regional Union commander, Major General Joseph J. Reynolds removed him from office on April 25, 1869, as "an impediment to Reconstruction".

Stephen W. Perkins had married in 1850, but his wife, Anne E., died before 1860. No specific documentation has been produced to indicate his activity after 1869, including the year of his death.

== Notes ==
Texas House of Representatives
Preceded by William H. Bourland	Speaker of the Texas House of Representatives; 1846–1847	Succeeded by Charles G. Keenan
Texas Senate
Preceded by John Greenville McNeill	Texas State Senator from District 12 (Bailey's Prairie); 1849–1851	Succeeded by Isaac W. Brashear
