= William H. Bourland =

American politician

William Howard Bourland (c. 1811–1860) was a politician in the Republic of Texas and early statehood Texas who served briefly as Speaker of the Texas House of Representatives during the First Texas Legislature.

Bourland was born in about 1811 in Kentucky to Benjamin Bourland and the former Agnes Nancy McElroy. He moved to Texas in 1840 and joined the Texas Rangers in 1841, leading a group of men at the Battle of Village Creek on 24 May 1841 in what is now Tarrant County.

Bourland represented Lamar County in the Eighth and Ninth Congresses of the Republic of Texas (1843–1845), and introduced the legislation that incorporated Paris, the county seat of Lamar County, on 3 February 1845.

After the annexation of Texas into the United States, Bourland represented the county in the First and Second Texas Legislatures. On 1 May 1846, he was elected Speaker of the Texas House of Representatives, but resigned before the end of the session on 13 May 1846. Bourland later represented Grayson County in the Fifth Texas Legislature.

Bourland was married twice. His first wife was Rachel C. Davis, and his second was Caroline Willis, a member of the Chickasaw nation. He died 2 April 1860 in Dexter in Cooke County.

Bourland was the brother of James G. Bourland, a state senator from Lamar County.

Preceded by William Crump	Speaker of the Texas House of Representatives; 1846	Succeeded by Stephen W. Perkins
