= Dexter, Texas =

- Unincorporated community
- Location within Texas Location within the United States
- Coordinates: 33°49′7″N 96°57′49″W
- Country: United States
- State: Texas
- County: Cooke
- Elevation: 778 ft (237 m)
- Time zone: UTC-6 (Central (CST))
  - Summer (DST): UTC-5 (CDT)
- Area code: 940
- GNIS feature ID: 1355990

Dexter is an unincorporated community in Cooke County, Texas, United States. According to the Handbook of Texas, the community had a population of 18 in 2000. It is located within the Dallas-Fort Worth Metroplex.

== History ==
On September 8, 1986, an Amoco gas condensate pipeline leaked.14 people were injured.

The Washington House on Sycamore Creek Ranch in the community was listed on the National Register of Historic Places.

== Geography ==
Dexter is located on Farm to Market Road 678 near the Red River, 25 mi (40 km) northeast of Gainesville, 8.7 mi (14.0 km) east-northeast of Callisburg, and 11.5 mi (18.5 km) west-northwest of Whitesboro in extreme northeastern Cooke County.

== Education ==
Dexter had its own school in the early 1880s. Today, Dexter is served by the Whitesboro Independent School District.

== Notable people ==
- William H. Bourland, Speaker of the Texas House of Representatives during the First Texas Legislature.
- Charlie Robertson, former MLB pitcher.
