= Red Brown (politician) =

American politician (1787–1852)

John "Red" Brown

2nd Speaker of the Texas House of Representatives
- In office March 3, 1846 – March 9, 1846
- Preceded by: William E. Crump
- Succeeded by: Edward T. Branch
Additional positions
Member of the Texas House of Representatives
In office November 3, 1851 – November 6, 1851
Preceded by	William Hardeman
Succeeded by	Jonathan Russell
Constituency	17th district
In office February 16, 1846 – December 13, 1847
Preceded by	State legislature established
Succeeded by	Adolphus Sterne; John H. Reagan; Elisha Everett Lott
Constituency	Nacogdoches County
Member of the Rep. of Texas House of Representatives from the Nacogdoches district
In office September 6, 1841 – February 5, 1842
Preceded by	James S. Mayfield
Succeeded by	William F. Sparks
Member of the Alabama Senate
In office 1825–1827
Preceded by	John Wood
Succeeded by	John Wood
Constituency	Jefferson County
Member of the Alabama House of Representatives
In office November 18, 1833 – January 18, 1834 Serving with Hugh M. Carithers
Preceded by	Samuel Sidney Earle
Succeeded by	John Cantley; William A. Scott
Constituency	Jefferson County
In office November 17, 1828 – January 15, 1831
Preceded by	John Brown
Succeeded by	Emery Loyd; Harrison W. Goyne
Constituency	Jefferson County
In office November 17, 1823 – December 31, 1823 Serving with Isham Harrison
Preceded by	Isaac Brown; Thomas W. Farrar
Succeeded by	Thomas W. Farrar; Benjamin Worthington
Constituency	Jefferson County
In office 1819–1821
Preceded by	Legislature established
Succeeded by	Marston Mead
Constituency	Blount County

Personal details
- Born: 1787 South Carolina, U.S.
- Died: August 19, 1852 (aged 64–65) Henderson County, Texas, U.S.
- Party: Democratic
- Spouses: Margaret Hodges Brooks (m. 1806; died 1849) Elizabeth Ann (née Rainer) Holland (m. 1851)

John "Red" Brown (1787 – August 19, 1852) was an American politician who served in both chambers of the Alabama Legislature, as a representative in the Republic of Texas and later as a state representative for Texas. He served briefly as the second Speaker of the Texas House of Representatives in the First Texas Legislature. Brown was also one of the founders of the Democratic Party in Texas and is the founder and namesake of Brownsboro, Texas. He had one of the shortest terms as Speaker of the Texas House of Representatives, with only 7 days in office.

== Early life ==
Linda S. Hudson wrote that Brown was likely born in Ireland and that early Texas census records list him as an Irishman and a farmer. However Willis Brewer and the Research Division of the Texas Legislative Council have written that John "Red" Brown was born in South Carolina in 1787. He was commonly known as Red due to his ruddy complexion, to distinguish himself from the other John Browns in the county. Brown moved to Alabama from South Carolina in about 1818.

== Political career ==
On September 17, 1822, Brown was appointed as the presiding judge of Jefferson County, Alabama. He held the judicial office until January 1, 1823. He succeeded Peter Walker in county court, now known as the probate court, and was succeeded by Walker Keith Baylor. He was a member of both houses of the general assembly and moved to Tuskaloosa in 1834. He was the steward of the University of Alabama until he moved to Texas two years later.

He moved to Texas in 1836, settling in the Nacogdoches district. Brown represented Nacogdoches in the 6th Congress of the Republic of Texas from 1841 to 1842.

Brown was elected to the First Texas Legislature after the annexation of Texas into the United States. On March 3, 1846, Speaker William Crump was given a leave of absence, and Brown was elected Speaker of the House pro tempore. On March 9, 1846, Brown resigned as Speaker pro tempore, and the House elected Edward Thomas Branch.

He was a founder of Henderson County when it was formed from Nacogdoches County in 1846. Brown served as a notary public and a ferry operator, and received a license to operate a toll-bridge over Kickapoo Creek near Old Normandy (present-day Brownsboro, which was named for John Brown). On 27 April 1846, Brown helped to found the Texas Democratic Party in Austin. Brown served as a commissioner to help locate the state penitentiary in 1848. He served as a notary public in Henderson County the same year. Brown established the town of Brownsboro in 1849, now the oldest town in Henderson County. In 1850, Brown was one of the county commissioners that selected Athens as the seat of Henderson County.

Brown was a member of the Texas House of Representatives from the 17th district for 4 days. He was sworn in on November 3, 1851, and was unseated on November 6 following a contested election. He served until a vote recount proved that his opponent, Jonathan Russell, won the election.

== Personal life ==
Brown was married to Margaret Hodges Brooks. After her death in 1849, he married Elizabeth Ann (née Rainer) Holland in 1851. In the 1850 census, he was recorded as living in Van Zandt County, Texas.

== Bibliography ==
- Brewer, Willis (1872). Alabama: Her History, Resources, War Record, and Public Men from 1540 to 1872. Montgomery, Alabama: Barret & Brown, Steam Printers and Book Binders. ISBN 0871522020. OCLC 1713289 – via the Internet Archive.
- Du Bose, John Witherspoon (1887). Jefferson County and Birmingham Alabama Historical and Biographical. Birmingham, Alabama: Jeeple & Smith. LCCN rc01002471. OCLC 1047516396.

Legal offices
Preceded by Peter Walker	Presiding County Judge of Jefferson County, Alabama	Succeeded by Walker Keith Baylor
Political offices
Preceded by James S. Mayfield	Member of the Republic of Texas House of Representatives from Nacogdoches; 1841–1842	Succeeded by William F. Sparks
Texas House of Representatives
Preceded by William Hardeman	Member of the Texas House of Representatives from District 17 (Brownsboro); 1851	Succeeded by Jonathan Russell
Preceded by William Crump	Speaker of the Texas House of Representatives; March 3, 1846 – March 9, 1846	Succeeded by Edward Thomas Branch
Preceded by State legislature established	Member of the Texas House of Representatives from Nacogdoches County (Nacogdoches); 1846–1847	Succeeded by Adolphus Sterne; John H. Reagan; Elisha Everett Lott
Alabama Senate
Preceded by John Wood	Member of the Alabama Senate from Jefferson County; 1825–1827	Succeeded by John Wood
Alabama House of Representatives
Preceded by Samuel Sidney Earle	Member of the Alabama House of Representatives from Jefferson County; 1819–1821	Succeeded by John Cantley; William A. Scott
Preceded by John Brown	Member of the Alabama House of Representatives from Jefferson County; 1819–1821	Succeeded by Emory Loyd; Harrison W. Goyne
Preceded by Isaac Brown; Thomas W. Farrar	Member of the Alabama House of Representatives from Jefferson County; 1823	Succeeded by Thomas W. Farrar; Benjamin Worthington
Preceded by Legislature established	Member of the Alabama House of Representatives from Blount County; 1819–1821	Succeeded by Marston Mead
