= Edward Thomas Branch =

American judge (1811–1861)

- Born: December 6, 1811; Richmond, Virginia
- Died: September 24, 1861 (aged 49); Liberty, Texas
- Occupations: legislator, soldier and judge
- Years active: 1835-1861
- Relatives: Cornelia Branch Stone (daughter)

Edward Thomas Branch (December 6, 1811 – September 24, 1861) was a Republic of Texas legislator and Judge, and after the annexation of Texas to the United States, served briefly as Speaker of the Texas House of Representatives

== Biography ==
Branch was born on December 6, 1811, in Richmond, Virginia. After relocating to Jackson, Mississippi, he settled at Liberty, Texas in 1835 after having been hijacked on his way to Cuba and put ashore at Anahuac. He worked as a teacher in Liberty through early 1836.

Branch joined the Texas Army during the Texas Revolution, serving as a first sergeant under William M. Logan, and saw action at the Battle of San Jacinto. He later re-enlisted and served a stint as first lieutenant under Benjamin Franklin Hardin in 1837.

Residents of Liberty County sent Branch as their representative to the First and Second Congresses of the Republic of Texas (1836–1838). He chaired the House Ways and Means Committee during both sessions. Branch was appointed a District Judge in 1838, which also made him an associate justice of the Texas Supreme Court. He served as judge until 12 August 1840.

In 1843, he served as postmaster of Liberty, and in 1846, as representative of Liberty in the Texas House of Representatives of the First Texas Legislature. During that session, Branch was elected Speaker of the House pro tempore and served as Speaker from his election on 9 March 1846 until Speaker William Crump returned from a leave of absence on 16 March 1846.

In private life, Branch split his time between farming and his law practice. Branch at one time owned over 3,000 acres (12 km^{2}) of land and was a slaveholder. On 15 August 1838, Branch married Annie Cleveland Wharton, an adopted child of William Harris Wharton. Together they had five children, including a daughter, Cornelia Branch Stone. He was a Mason and a Methodist.

Branch died on September 24, 1861, and is buried in Liberty.

== Notes ==
Preceded by None	Member of the Texas House of Representatives; 1846–1847	Succeeded by Napoleon Bonaparte Charlton
Preceded by John "Red" Brown	Speaker of the Texas House of Representatives; 9 March 1846–16 March 1846	Succeeded by William Crump
