= William Edmond Crump =

American politician (1809–1889)

1st and 4th Speaker of the Texas House of Representatives
- In office February 16, 1846 – March 3, 1846
- Succeeded by: John "Red" Brown
- In office March 16, 1846 – May 1, 1846
- Preceded by: Edward Thomas Branch
- Succeeded by: William Howard Bourland

Member of the Texas House of Representatives
- In office February 16, 1846 – November 5, 1849 Serving with Charles R. Railey
- Constituency: Austin County
- In office November 5, 1849 – October 13, 1850
- Succeeded by: Zimri Hunt
- Constituency: 33rd district

Member of the North Carolina House of Commons from Northampton County
- In office November 17, 1834 – December 22, 1835
- Succeeded by: Herod Faison

Personal details
- Born: 1809 North Carolina, U.S.
- Died: January 3, 1889 (aged 79–80) Bellville, Texas, U.S.
- Party: Democratic
- Spouse: Rosa C. Ballentine (m. 1836)

William Edmond Crump (1809 – January 3, 1889) was an American politician from North Carolina who was the first Speaker of the Texas House of Representatives following the annexation of Texas. A representative from Austin County, Crump was elected speaker on the first ballot without any substantial opposition. Before he was elected to the Texas House of Representatives he was elected to the North Carolina House of Commons.

== Biography ==
William Edmond Crump was born in 1809 in North Carolina. He was elected to the North Carolina House of Commons and served from 1834 to 1835. He married Rosa C. Ballentine, a Scottish woman, in North Carolina in 1836. Subsequently, he moved his family to Vicksburg, Mississippi, and then moved his family to Texas in the 1830s. He settled his family along the Brazos River east of Bellville, and established Crump's Ferry. Crump's Ferry was not far north of San Felipe, where Stephen F. Austin had earlier founded the headquarters of his first colony, Crump established a plantation, Crump's Ferry. He had one child with Rosa Ballentine; William Edmond Crump Jr.

In Texas, Crump became involved in one brief military venture, the Vasquez Campaign that countered a Mexican raid on San Antonio in 1842.

Elected to the Texas House of Representatives following statehood, he presided as speaker for most of the 1st state legislature. His tenure was punctuated by a leave of absence from March 3 to March 16, 1846 and by his subsequent resignation on May 1, 1846, 12 days before the 1st Texas Legislature adjourned. Among its other accomplishments, the 1st state legislature created over 30 counties, organized a set of courts, established a militia, authorized a state penitentiary, and provided for a regular census and a system of taxation.

Crump was re-elected as a member of the Texas House of Representatives twice. He also served in the 2nd state legislature, and part of the 3rd state legislature before he resigned and vacated legislative office completely. He returned to his home near Bellville. A large landholder, Crump was one of the wealthiest men in the region.

Crump remained in Austin County for the rest of his life, at one point becoming county judge. He died in Bellville on January 3, 1889.

Preceded by Unknown	Member of the North Carolina House of Commons from Northampton County; 1834-1835	Succeeded by Herod Faison
Preceded by None	Speaker of the Texas House of Representatives; February 16, 1846–March 3, 1846	Succeeded by John "Red" Brown
Preceded by Edward Thomas Branch	Speaker of the Texas House of Representatives; March 16, 1846–May 1, 1846	Succeeded by William H. Bourland
