= Jessie Andrews (American academic) =

First female graduate of UT Austin (1867–1919)

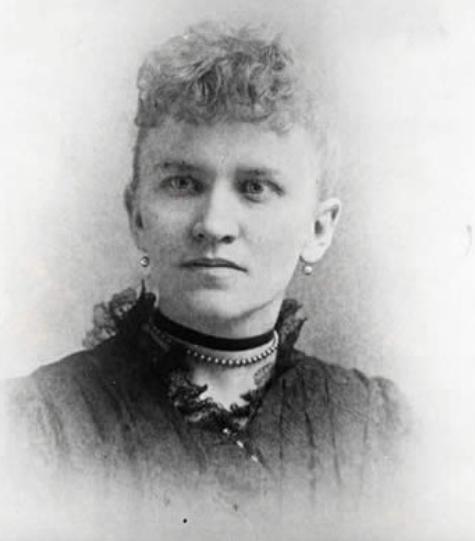
- Born: February 17, 1867; Washington, Mississippi
- Died: December 22, 1919 (aged 52); Austin, Texas
- Education: University of Texas at Austin; University of Chicago
- Occupation: Professor at UT Austin

Jessie Andrews (1867–1919) was the first female graduate of the University of Texas at Austin in 1886. In 1888 she became the first female instructor at the university, teaching German for 35 years. A dormitory at UT Austin, a public park, and a rose, have all been named for her (see Death and Legacy).

== Early life, education, and career ==
She was born in 1867 to mother Margaret L. Miller Andrews and father Jesse Andrews, and was one of five children. Her father moved to Texas for his health in 1873, and her mother brought her and the other children in 1874. Her father died in 1875, when she was eight. Andrews graduated from Austin High School in 1883, winning the Peabody Award for outstanding graduate. She graduated from UT Austin as a B.Litt. with a German major in 1886, and received a special award for being the first female graduate. Among her congratulations was a telegram from the acting president of the University of Virginia, which was read from the podium. She earned honors in mathematics, German, French and history, and became a member of Phi Beta Kappa in 1904, as soon as a chapter was established at the university.

She taught for one year at Mrs. Hood's Seminary for Young Ladies in Austin from 1886–1887, and then in 1888 joined the UT Austin faculty. She traveled over 2,200 miles roundtrip by train during each of nine summers to earn her master's degree in German and French from the University of Chicago, graduating in 1906.

She became the first woman member of the UT Austin alumni association, Texas Exes. She was active in the Arts League, the Y.W.C.A., and a group of university women that later became the Austin branch of the American Association of University Women. She taught Sunday School in a local Presbyterian Church.

== Poetry and post-academic life ==
She was a poet who once published a poem in The New York Times. In 1910 she published a book of poetry, Rough Rider Rhymes, and became the poet laureate of the Texas Women's Press Association. She also published a poem in honor of the first edition of Alcalde, the UT Austin alumni yearbook.

In 1918, after 35 years of teaching at UT Austin, she resigned, citing disillusionment with Germany during World War I. She and her younger sister Fannie (c. 1869–1960) ran Ye Qualitye Shoppe in Austin together. Andrews Elementary School in Austin is named for Fanny. They were both listed as landscape painters.

== Death and cultural legacy ==
She contracted pneumonia in 1919, just one year after her retirement from the university, and died at age 52. To commemorate her life, the Alcalde dedicated its May 1920 issue to her. The Briscoe Center for American History Manuscripts at UT Austin houses her archive. Andrews dormitory at UT Austin is named for her. Jessie Andrews Park in Austin is also named for her. The Tyler Rose Growers Association named a rose for her in 1938.
