= 1st Texas Legislature =

The 1st Texas Legislature convened from February 16 to May 13, 1846, in regular session. Members of the House of Representatives and Senate were elected in December 1845, after an election on October 13, 1845, that ratified the proposed state constitution.

== Sessions ==
- 1st Regular session: February 16–May 13, 1846

== Officers ==
=== Senate ===
Lieutenant Governor
Albert Clinton Horton, Democrat
President pro tempore
Edward Burleson, Democrat

=== House of Representatives ===
Speaker of the House
William Crump, Democrat, February 16 – May 1, 1846
William H. Bourland, Democrat, May 1–11, 1846
Stephen W. Perkins, Democrat, May 11–13, 1846
Speaker of the House pro tempore
John "Red" Brown, Democrat, acting Speaker March 3–9, 1846
Edward Thomas Branch, Democrat, acting Speaker March 9–16, 1846

== Members ==
=== Senate ===
Members of the Texas Senate for the First Texas Legislature:

District	Senator	Party	Took office	Left office
1	William M. "Buckskin" Williams	[data missing]	February 16, 1846	December 13, 1847
2	Ballard C. Bagby	Democrat	February 16, 1846	December 13, 1847
3	Edward Clark	[data missing]	Elected but never sworn	
3	William Thomas Scott	[data missing]	Elected but never sworn	
4	Joseph Lewis Hogg	Whig	February 16, 1846	May 4, 1846
5	Benjamin Rush Wallace	Democrat	February 16, 1846	December 13, 1847
6	Jesse J. Robinson	Democrat	February 16, 1846	December 13, 1847
7	William C. Abbott	[data missing]	Elected but never sworn	
7	George Tyler Wood	Democrat	Elected but never sworn	
8	Henry James Jewett	Polk man	February 16, 1846	December 13, 1847
9	Jesse Grimes	[data missing]	February 16, 1846	December 13, 1847
10	Isaac Wright Brashear	Democrat	February 17, 1846	December 13, 1847
11	Richard Bache Jr.	[data missing]	Elected but never sworn	
11	Thomas Freeman McKinney	Tyler man	Elected but never sworn	
12	John Greenville McNeill	Democrat	February 16, 1846	December 13, 1847
13	Philip Minor Cuney	Democrat	February 16, 1846	December 13, 1847
14	John F. Miller	Democrat	February 16, 1846	December 13, 1847
15	Edward Murray Burleson	Tyler man	February 16, 1846	December 13, 1847
16	Robert McAlpin Williamson	Democrat	February 16, 1846	December 13, 1847
17	Alexander H. Phillips	Anti-tariff	February 16, 1846	December 13, 1847
18	José Antonio Navarro	[data missing]	February 16, 1846	December 13, 1847
19	Henry Lawrence Kinney	[data missing]	Elected but never sworn	
F	James G. Bourland	Democrat	February 16, 1846	December 13, 1847

=== House of Representatives ===
Members of the House of Representatives for the First Texas Legislature:

District	Representative	Party	Took office	Left office
Austin	William Edmund Crump	Democrat	February 16, 1846	December 13, 1847
Austin	Charles Railey	[data missing]	February 16, 1846	December 13, 1847
Bastrop	Evans Mabry	[data missing]	February 16, 1846	December 13, 1847
Bexar	Volney Erskine Howard	[data missing]	March 16, 1846	December 13, 1847
Bexar	Duncan Campbell Ogden	[data missing]	February 16, 1846	December 13, 1847
Bowie	Berry H. Durham	[data missing]	February 16, 1846	December 13, 1847
Bowie	Alexander J. Russell	[data missing]	February 16, 1846	December 13, 1847
Brazoria	Elisha Marshall Pease	[data missing]	February 16, 1846	December 13, 1847
Brazoria	Stephen W. Perkins	Democrat	February 16, 1846	December 13, 1847
Brazos	Elliott McNeil Millican	[data missing]	February 17, 1846	December 13, 1847
Colorado	William B. Perry	[data missing]	February 16, 1846	December 13, 1847
Colorado	Samuel Joseph Redgate	Democrat	February 17, 1846	December 13, 1847
Fannin	Samuel McFarland	Democrat	February 16, 1846	December 13, 1847
Fannin	Hiram W. Ryburn	Democrat	February 16, 1846	December 13, 1847
Fayette	James P. Hudson	[data missing]	February 16, 1846	December 13, 1847
Fayette	Charles Mullins	Democrat	February 16, 1846	December 13, 1847
Fort Bend	William S. Rayner	Democrat	February 16, 1846	December 13, 1847
Galveston	James Cronican	Democrat	February 16, 1846	December 13, 1847
Galveston	Israel S. Savage	Democrat	February 16, 1846	December 13, 1847
Goliad	Charles F. Augustus Williams	Whig	February 16, 1846	August 4, 1846
Gonzales	Benjamin McCulloch	Democrat	February 16, 1846	December 13, 1847
Gonzales	Arthur Swift	Democrat	February 16, 1846	December 13, 1847
Harris	Peter W. Gray	[data missing]	February 16, 1846	December 13, 1847
Harris	John N. O. Smith	[data missing]	February 17, 1846	December 13, 1847
Harris	Benjamin F. Tankersly	[data missing]	February 16, 1846	December 13, 1847
Harrison	Edward Clark	Democrat	Elected but never sworn	
Harrison	Spearman Holland	[data missing]	February 16, 1846	December 13, 1847
Harrison	James B. McCown	[data missing]	February 16, 1846	December 13, 1847
Houston	Steward Alexander Miller	[data missing]	February 16, 1846	December 13, 1847
Houston	William Turner Sadler	[data missing]	February 16, 1846	December 13, 1847
Jackson	Francis Menefee White	[data missing]	December 16, 1846	December 13, 1847
Jasper	Z. Williams Eddy	[data missing]	February 16, 1846	December 13, 1847
Jefferson	George Alexander Pattillo	Republican	February 16, 1846	December 13, 1847
Lamar	William H. Bourland	[data missing]	February 17, 1846	December 13, 1847
Liberty	Edward Thomas Branch	Tariff man	February 16, 1846	December 13, 1847
Liberty	Napoleon Bonaparte Charlton	Democrat	February 16, 1846	December 13, 1847
Matagorda	Henry Jones	Nullifier	February 24, 1846	December 13, 1847
Milam	George Bernard Erath	Democrat	February 17, 1846	December 13, 1847
Montgomery	David Catchings Dickson	Democrat	February 16, 1846	December 13, 1847
Montgomery	Charles Gradison Keenan	Democrat	February 16, 1846	December 13, 1847
Montgomery	Archibald McNeill	Democrat	February 16, 1846	December 13, 1847
Montgomery	Charles Bellinger Tate Stewart	Democrat	February 16, 1846	December 13, 1847
Nacogdoches	John "Red" Brown	[data missing]	February 16, 1846	December 13, 1847
Nacogdoches	Haden Harrison Edwards	[data missing]	February 16, 1846	December 13, 1847
Nacogdoches	Daniel Muckleroy	Democrat	February 16, 1846	December 13, 1847
Red River	Lewis D. Barry	[data missing]	February 16, 1846	December 13, 1847
Red River	James Shackleford Gillett	[data missing]	February 17, 1846	December 13, 1847
Red River	James Gillam	[data missing]	February 16, 1846	December 13, 1847
Red River	Benjamin Gooch	[data missing]	February 16, 1846	December 13, 1847
Robertson	George W. Adams	[data missing]	February 16, 1846	December 13, 1847
Robertson	Wilds K. Cooke	Democrat	February 16, 1846	December 13, 1847
Rusk	Charles F. McClarty	[data missing]	February 16, 1846	December 13, 1847
Rusk	James Smith	[data missing]	February 16, 1846	December 13, 1847
Sabine	James M. Burroughs	[data missing]	February 16, 1846	December 13, 1847
Sabine	Jamerson Noble	[data missing]	February 16, 1846	December 13, 1847
San Augustine	William C. Edwards	[data missing]	February 16, 1846	December 13, 1847
San Augustine	Henry Williams Sublett	Democrat	February 16, 1846	December 13, 1847
San Patricio	Alexander Stevenson	[data missing]	February 16, 1846	December 13, 1847
Shelby	William Echols	[data missing]	February 16, 1846	December 13, 1847
Shelby	James A. Truitt	Democrat	February 16, 1846	December 13, 1847
Travis	William Leslie Cazneau	[data missing]	February 27, 1846	December 13, 1847
Victoria	John Washington Rose	[data missing]	February 16, 1846	December 13, 1847
Washington	Lewis Dupree	[data missing]	February 16, 1846	December 13, 1847
Washington	Van Rensaeller Irion	[data missing]	February 16, 1846	December 13, 1847
Washington	James Willie	[data missing]	February 17, 1846	December 13, 1847

== Membership changes ==
=== Senate ===
District	Outgoing Senator	Reason for Vacancy	Successor	Date of Successor's Installation
District 3	William Thomas Scott	Scott resigned June 5, 1847 due to an eye disease.	Edward Clark	December 13, 1847
District 4	Joseph Lewis Hogg	Hogg was granted a leave of absence May 4, 1846 to join the Second Regiment of the Texas Mounted Volunteers for the Mexican–American War, and resigned some time after that.	Isaac Parker	after May 4, 1846
District 7	George Tyler Wood	Wood was granted a leave of absence May 4, 1846 to join the Second Regiment of the Texas Mounted Volunteers for the Mexican–American War, and resigned before September 4, 1847.	William C. Abbott	December 13, 1847
District 11	Thomas Freeman McKinney	McKinney resigned after the end of the session (May 13, 1846).	Richard Bache	December 13, 1847
