= Press Women of Texas =

Texas women journalists association

Press Women of Texas (PWT) is an association of Texas women journalists which was founded in 1893. PWT is an affiliate of the National Federation of Press Women (NFPW). PWT was involved in more than just supporting women in journalism; the organization advocated many causes, including education, preservation of library and archive materials and supporting scholarships. They also supported women's suffrage in Texas in 1915. Angela Smith is the current president of PWT.

== History ==
Press Women of Texas (PWT) was started on May 10, 1893 in Dallas and was originally named the Texas Woman's Press Association (TWPA). Aurelia Hadley Mohl, a journalist from Houston invited 38 women to hear a proposal to form the TWPA in 1893. Mohl had been a member of the Woman's National Press Association and felt that a similar group in Texas would be good for women writers in that state. Forty-three women would become charter members of TWPA. Mohl was the first president of TWPA, elected in 1895. Originally, the group was created in order to provide professional encouragement for Texas women writers of all types and included illustrators. TWPA allowed women in Texas to be full participants of a press club. TWPA would meet annually for an assembly session which included networking and speeches.

TWPA was involved in pushing for the establishment of the school which later became Texas Woman's University. TWPA, along with the Texas Federation of Women's Clubs, the Grange and the Woman's Christian Temperance Union worked towards the creation of a school where women could receive a "practical education."

By 1913, the group was influential enough to push for women to be included at the University of Texas' new School of Journalism, which opened in 1914. TWPA, in 1916, was the first organization to provide scholarships for the new journalism school.

TWPA became affiliated with the National Federation of Press Women (NFPW) in 1938. After 1941, the group restricted its membership to active journalists only.

TWPA supported the building of a better Texas State Library and archive in 1939. Their initiative wasn't successful, but was important in bringing attention to the poor state of the archives at the time.

The organization changed its name to Texas Press Women (TPW) in 1961, and became officially incorporated. TPW also broadened its scope that year to include any women writer in the communications field. TPW divided itself into several districts by 1971.

In 1995, the group again changed its name to Texas Professional Communicators (TPC). This was in line with a national trend where former women's press groups were ceasing to identify with their gender.

In 2002, it changed its name to Press Women of Texas.

== Notable people ==
- Jessie Andrews (American academic), poet laureate of the PWT
- Willie Franklin Pruit (1865-1947), American poet
- Cornelia Branch Stone (1840–1925), president

== See also ==
- List of newspapers in Texas
