= Arthur Swift =

American politician

Member of the Texas House of Representatives from the Gonzales district
- In office February 16, 1846 – December 13, 1847
- Preceded by: State legislature established
- Succeeded by: John D. Anderson

Personal details
- Born: December 17, 1810 Louisa County, Virginia, U.S.
- Died: April 13, 1855 (aged 44) Seguin, Texas, U.S.
- Party: Democratic
- Spouses: Margaret Baker (died 1853) Philadelphia Borden (m. 1855)
- Known for: Co-founder of Seguin, Texas

Military service
- Allegiance: Republic of Texas
- Years of service: 1838–1843
- Unit: Caldwell's Rangers; Callahan's Gonzales-Seguin Rangers
- Battles/wars: Battle of Salado Creek

Arthur Swift (December 17, 1810 – April 13, 1855) was a 19th-century Texas merchant, surveyor, political and military figure. He, along with Rangers Mathew Caldwell, and James Campbell, were founders of Seguin, Texas. He participated in the Texas–Indian wars. He served as a member of the Texas House of Representatives from the Gonzales district in the First Texas Legislature. After Guadalupe County was established with his hometown of Seguin as the county seat, Swift used his influence with the county commissioners to move the route of a planned road from Seguin to San Antonio.

== Early life and family ==
Arthur Swift was born on December 17, 1810, in Louisa County, Virginia. He moved to Tennessee as a young man, but walked all the way to Texas when the real estate market turned sour. He ended up in Gonzales, Texas, in 1837.

== Career in Texas ==
In 1838, Swift became one of the founders of Walnut Springs, a new town in Gonzales County, Texas. During this time, he was able to purchase large tracts of land in the area. In Gonzales County, he assisted in legal matters and represented clients and was soon appointed Tax Collector, Constable and Clerk in 1841. He was performing surveys as early as 1838 and later was Gonzales County surveyor from 1840-1844.

== Texas Republic Ranger ==
In 1841, Swift would serve under James Hughes Callahan, as a Gonzales Ranger during the Texas-Indian wars and again with Benjamin McCulloch's volunteers the same year. His partner James Campbell, had been killed by Indians the previous year. Caldwell would go on serving the city of Gonzales, while Swift, although serving Gonzales, concentrated his efforts in Seguin; purchasing the lands of his partners. In 1842, San Antonio would be overrun twice, by Santa Anna's forces. During March 1842, the citizens of San Antonio would seek refuge at Manuel Flores Ranch in the city of Seguin, Texas. Here, a counterattack was planned and Arthur Swift was a captain of the party that pursued the army of Ráfael Vásquez. In 1842, when Adrian Woll invaded Texas, Arthur Swift would participate at the Battle of Salado Creek as a second lieutenant in Mathew Caldwell's resistance forces.

== Businessman and politician ==
In 1846, Guadalupe County was organized through efforts by Swift. Swift would serve in the First State Legislature in 1846 and 1847, for the Gonzales district and had introduced the bill that organized the new county. He was married to Margaret Baker on July 2, 1845, daughter of Judge James McCulloch Baker, and they soon had four children. They had a limecrete style home built in Seguin, Texas, operated a ferry on the Guadalupe River and ran a general store in the town. He was also influential in the organization of the schools and First Baptist Church of Seguin. In 1855, his real estate and merchandise holdings were estimated to be worth around $250,000.

== Later life ==
Swift's first wife died around 1853 and in February 1855, Swift would marry Philadelphia Borden, the daughter of Gail Borden, however tragedy struck again and a month and ten days later, in April, his life was taken by a fever. James McCulloch Baker was appointed as administrator of Swift's estate, by the Guadalupe County Court. The Baker family would care for and raise the Swift children. Arthur Swift was buried in the Northwest corner of Vaughan Cemetery, in Seguin, Texas.

== Citations ==
Texas House of Representatives
Preceded by State Legislature Established	Member of the Texas House of Representatives from the Gonzales district (Seguin); 1846–1847	Succeeded by John D. Anderson
