= Willie Franklin Pruitt =

American poet

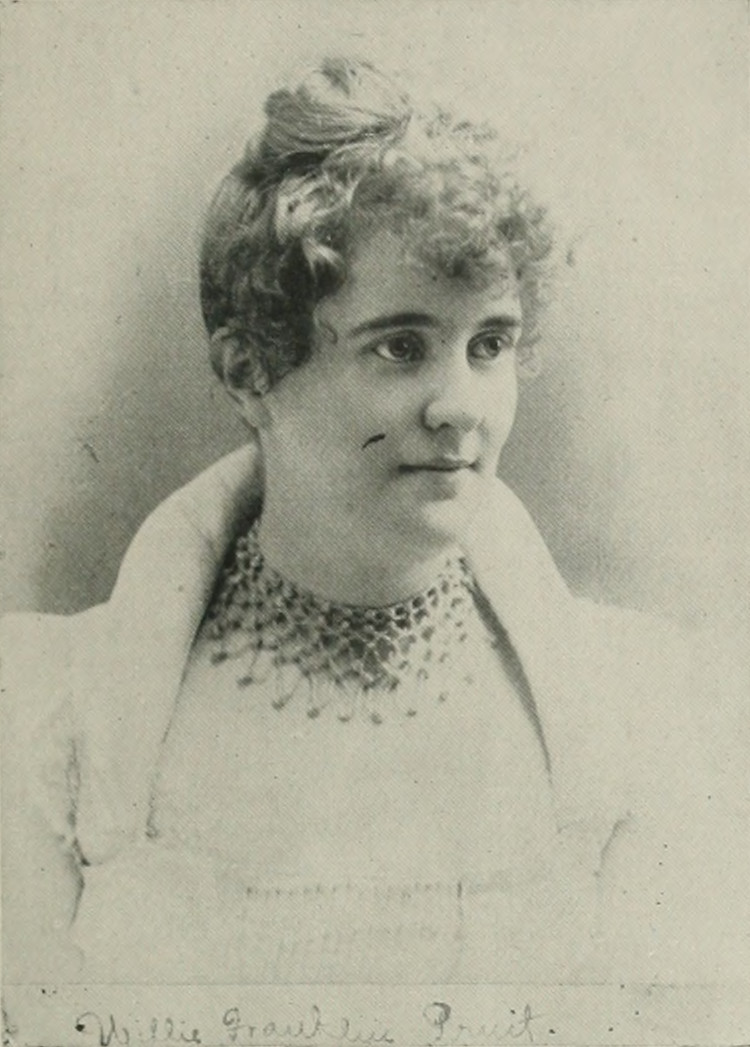
Willie Franklin Pruitt, A woman of the century

Willie Franklin Pruitt (sometimes misspelled "Pruit"; pen name, Aylmer Ney; January 11, 1865 – February 22, 1947) was an American activist and author. She was engaged in charitable and public enterprises. She was a member of the Texas board of lady managers of the World's Fair Exhibit Association, and the vice-president of the Woman's Humane Association of Fort Worth. Due to her efforts, the city installed a number of drinking fountains for people and for animals.

== Early life ==
Wilhelmina (nickname, "Willie") Franklin was born in Tennessee, on January 11, 1865. She belonged to one of the oldest and most aristocratic families of Tennessee, her family being closely identified with the social and political aristocracy of that State before the Civil War. At its close, while she was an infant, they moved to Texas, and settled in Washington County, Texas. There, at the Baylor University, Pruitt's school education began. It was continued and finished at the Waco Female College, and in her native State. Her education was thorough and liberal, and while in school, she displayed unusual intellectual talents.

She began to write verses when she was a child, and at the age of thirteen years she contributed to the local press.

== Career ==
At Waco, May 1, 1887, she married Drew Pruitt (1860–1937), a lawyer, of Fort Worth, in which city she moved. Their son, Drew, Jr., was born at Fort Worth in April, 1888.

Her work focused on matters of municipal reform, being an active participant in measures for the moral and physical comfort of the masses. One of the social schemes, born of modern philanthropy, with which she was closely identified was set forth in the declared purposes of a society named "The Woman's Humane Association," of which she was the president. Its object was to provide needed benefits, both for individuals and for the community at large; in work of the latter class, its most conspicuous achievement was the free distribution of pure drinking water throughout the city for people and animals. In carrying out the design, several stone fountains were erected, which, apart from their usefulness, were attractive features in the city.

Her reputation as a writer extended throughout the South. Pruitt's literary work indicated a versatile and cultured writer, and met with ready acceptance from papers and periodicals noted for their critical requirements. Her contributions, both prose and verse, usually appeared over the pseudonym of Aylmer Ney. She was a member of the Press Women of Texas.

In 1906, they removed to Los Angeles. Here, her husband was appointed judge, and made a specialty of corporation and probate law. She died on February 22, 1947, in San Antonio, Texas and is buried in the city's Mission Burial Park South.
