= Cornelia Branch Stone =

American clubwoman and suffragist (1840–1925)

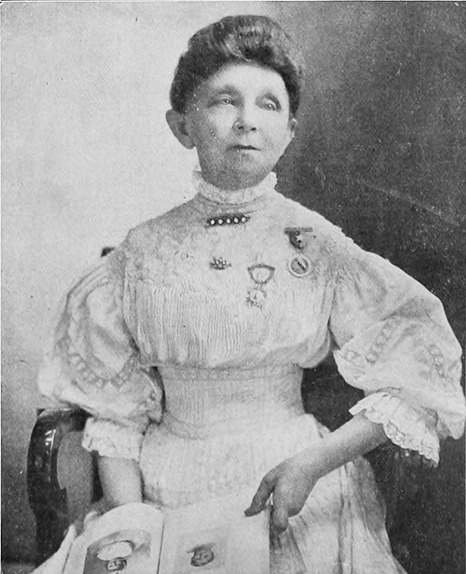
- Stone in 1908

9th President General, United Daughters of the Confederacy
- In office 1907–1909
- Preceded by: Lizzie George Henderson
- Succeeded by: Virginia Faulkner McSherry

President, Texas Woman's Press Association

Personal details
- Born: Cornelia Branch; February 13, 1840 Nacogdoches, Republic of Texas
- Died: January 18, 1925 (aged 84) Washington, D.C., U.S.
- Spouse: Henry Clay Stone
- Children: 2
- Parent: Edward Thomas Branch (father)
- Occupation: Non-profit executive; clubwoman; suffragist
- Writing career
- Notable work: U. D. C. Catechism for Children

Cornelia Branch Stone (1840–1925) was an American clubwoman and suffragist from Texas. She served as President-General of the United Daughters of the Confederacy (UDC) and President of the Texas Woman's Press Association.

== Early life ==
Cornelia Branch was born in Nacogdoches, Republic of Texas, on February 13, 1840. Her father, Edward Thomas Branch, a native of Chesterfield County, Virginia, went to Texas in the fall of 1835. He was a member of the first and second sessions of the Congress of the Republic of Texas, was district and supreme judge of that republic, and was a member of the first legislature of Texas. Her mother was Ann Wharton Cleveland.

== Career ==
Around 1855, at the age of fifteen, she married Henry Clay Stone, a Virginian by birth.

During the civil war, she was the organizer of a relief society and a hospital South where she spent nearly all of the four years working.

After her husband's death in 1887, Stone devoted her time to the education of her only son, Harry D. Stone, and when he had graduated in medicine, she took up her active work in the UDC. Her first official position was president of the Texas Division of the UDC. While Stone was president, the Texas Division increased twenty-six chapters in two years. For two terms (1907–09), she served as president-general of the UDC and during that administration, she kept in touch through correspondence with all the members and the heads of departments, writing every letter with her own hand. During Stone's tenure as president-general of the UDC, her only son died. She was also the chair of the committee on design for the Confederate Memorial in Arlington National Cemetery erected by the general association of the UDC. She was a co-organizer of the Arlington Monument Association.

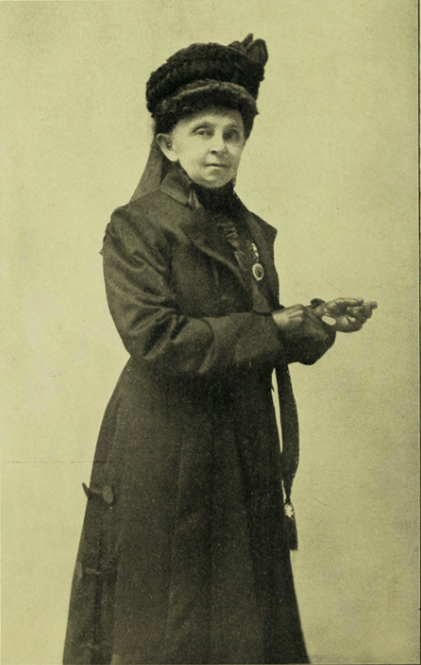
Stone in 1911

She was first vice-president of the Texas Federation of Women's Clubs, during which time, she was chair of a committee to secure an amendment to the poll tax law of the state of Texas. The effect of this was to better enforce the poll tax, one-fourth of which was paid to the school fund of Texas, and it was wholly through the efforts of Stone that the amendment was carried, increasing the school fund by many thousands of dollars. As chair for two years of the committee on education in the Texas Federation of Women's Clubs, she contributed many papers on educational interests, secured scholarship in several colleges of Texas, and recommended in her report the provision of a fund by the clubs for the maintenance of the beneficiaries of these scholarships when unable to pay board and lodging.

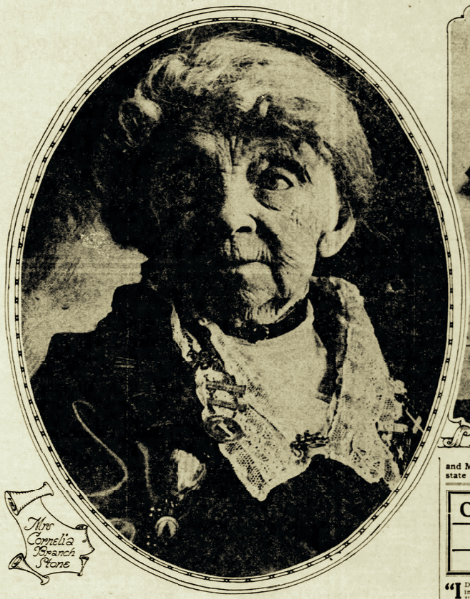
Stone in 1921

Stone served as president of the Texas Woman's Press Association. She held offices of trust in the Daughters of the Republic of Texas (DRT), and as first vice-president, served as acting president at their convention. Stone was also affiliated with the Texas Society of Colonial Dames of America and Daughters of the American Revolution (DAR). It was largely through Stone's efforts that the name of Jefferson Davis was restored to the tablet on Cabin John's Bridge, near Washington, D.C. She also served as vice-president of the Texas State Historical Association, member of the board of the Texas Art League, and member of the board of trustees of the Rosenberg Free Library of Galveston, Texas.

During World War I, she took an active part in the work of the UDC in the establishment of hospital beds and facilities for the American soldiers in France.

== Death and legacy ==
Cornelia B. Stone died in Washington, D.C. on January 18, 1925.

In 1925, the UDC established a scholarship in Stone's name at the Randolph–Macon College in Ashland, Virginia.

== Selected works ==
- 1904, U. D. C. Catechism for Children
