= Lizzie George Henderson =

8th President General of the United Daughters of the Confederacy

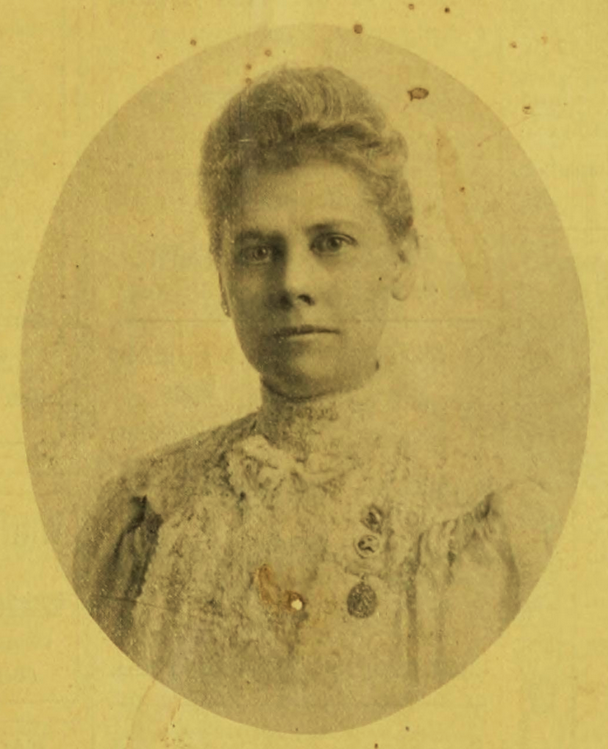
- Henderson circa 1905

8th President General of the United Daughters of the Confederacy
- In office 1905–1907
- Succeeded by: Cornelia Branch Stone

Personal details
- Born: 1863
- Died: August 1, 1937 (aged 73–74)
- Spouse: T. R. Henderson
- Parents: James Z. George (father); Elizabeth Brooks Young (mother)
- Occupation: clubwoman philanthropist

Lizzie George Henderson (1863 – August 1, 1937) was an American philanthropist, socialite, and clubwoman who served as President General of the United Daughters of the Confederacy from 1905 to 1907.

== Early life and family ==
Born Lizzie George, Henderson was the youngest daughter of Senator James Z. George and Elizabeth Brooks Young. She grew up at Cotesworth, an antebellum mansion in North Carrollton, Mississippi. Her father, a slaveowner, was a member of the Mississippi Secession Convention and a signatory of the Mississippi Secession Ordinance. During the American Civil War, he served as an officer in the Confederate States Army. Her mother was the granddaughter of Col. William Martin Jr. of Tennessee, and the great-granddaughter of General Joseph Martin, an early Virginia explorer and Revolutionary War commander.

== Philanthropy ==
Henderson was the president of the Woman's Club of Greenwood, Mississippi. Under her leadership, the club raised $10,000 for an annex to the Carnegie Library in Greenwood, which later became the Confederate Memorial Building. She and her husband donated the land for the construction of the library. She applied for a grant from the Andrew Carnegie Foundation and received an additional $10,000 to fund the project. Henderson supplied the library's original collection of books, which came from her father's collection at Cotesworth.

== United Daughters of the Confederacy ==
Henderson was a member of the J. Z. George Chapter of the United Daughters of the Confederacy (UDC) in Greenwood, Mississippi. In 1899, she launched a campaign to contact country clerks across Mississippi to determine the number and condition of impoverished Confederate veterans. She sponsored trips to other state homes in order to research the potential costs involved with opening and operating a veterans' care facility. In 1901, at the reunion of the United Confederate Veterans in Memphis, Tennessee, she secured almost 600 veterans' signatures supporting a state home.

Henderson served as the UDC's president general from 1905 to 1907. On March 4, 1906, William Howard Taft, then the Secretary of War, gave the UDC permission to erect a memorial in the center of the Confederate section at Arlington National Cemetery. Taft's letter, however, reserved to the War Department the right to approve the monument's design and inscriptions. On March 13, 1906, Henderson accepted Taft's terms for the memorial.

In 1906, she called on members of the UDC to support the women of the California Division.

In 1907, Henderson said she wanted the UDC to work "like a well-regulated army" and if it did then it would "very soon be the most influential association" in the United States. She claimed that God had not allowed the UDC to "grow so rapidly and so well for a small purpose".

== Personal life ==
Henderson married T. R. Henderson, a physician, in November 1890. He died in 1934.

Henderson was a Democrat. She was a leader in the Baptist Church of Greenwood.

Henderson died on August 1, 1937, at her home. She was buried in Odd Fellows Cemetery

== Bibliography ==
- Herbert, Hilary A. History of the Arlington Confederate Monument. Richmond, Va.: United Daughters of the Confederacy, 1915.
