= Haden Harrison Edwards =

American politician (1812–1865)

Haden Harrison Edwards (1812–1865) was a Texan, born in Virginia but brought to Nacogdoches as a youngster by his father, onetime empresario Haden Edwards. Haden Harrison Edwards worked as a livestock trader, soldier, politician and railroad executive. He founded the Sabine Pass and East Texas Railway and was that company's first president.

== Military career ==
Edwards was already a well-travelled cattle trader when the Texas Revolution broke out. He was soon elected captain of a company of volunteers which served at the Siege of Bexar. Further military service in Indian campaigns after the Revolution led to the Republic of Texas government's appointing him as a brigadier general. After the annexation of Texas, the Texas military was dissolved and its commissions no longer recognized, so when the Mexican–American War subsequently broke out, Edwards enlisted as a private in Company E, Second Regiment of the Texas Mounted Rifles. However, he was granted a discharge due to disability on August 31, 1846.

== Politics ==
Edwards was elected to the 1st Congress of the Republic of Texas as a Representative for a district centered around Nacogdoches. Following statehood, he was also a member of the 1st and 8th Texas Legislatures, again representing the Nacogdoches area, and also represented that area as a delegate to the Texas Succession Convention, which voted to leave the Union in 1861.

== Business ==
Edwards served as president of the Sabine Pass and East Texas Railway, beginning in 1858. Construction began and some rails were in place when the outbreak of the American Civil War halted all activity. Subsequently, the rails which had been laid were taken up and used in the fortification of Sabine Pass. As soon as the war ended, Edwards began working to revive the railroad, and was in Cincinnati, Ohio in August, 1865 trying to arrange financing for it when he died.

== Personal ==
Edwards married the former Sarah Forbes in Nacogdoches on October 22, 1843. Mrs. Edwards subsequently gave birth to eight children. The eldest, Peyton Foster Edwards (1844–1918), served as a Confederate soldier and then followed his father into the political arena, becoming known as "the red rooster of Nacogdoches", representing the area for two terms in the Texas Senate prior to moving to El Paso.
