= Brownsboro, Texas =

- City
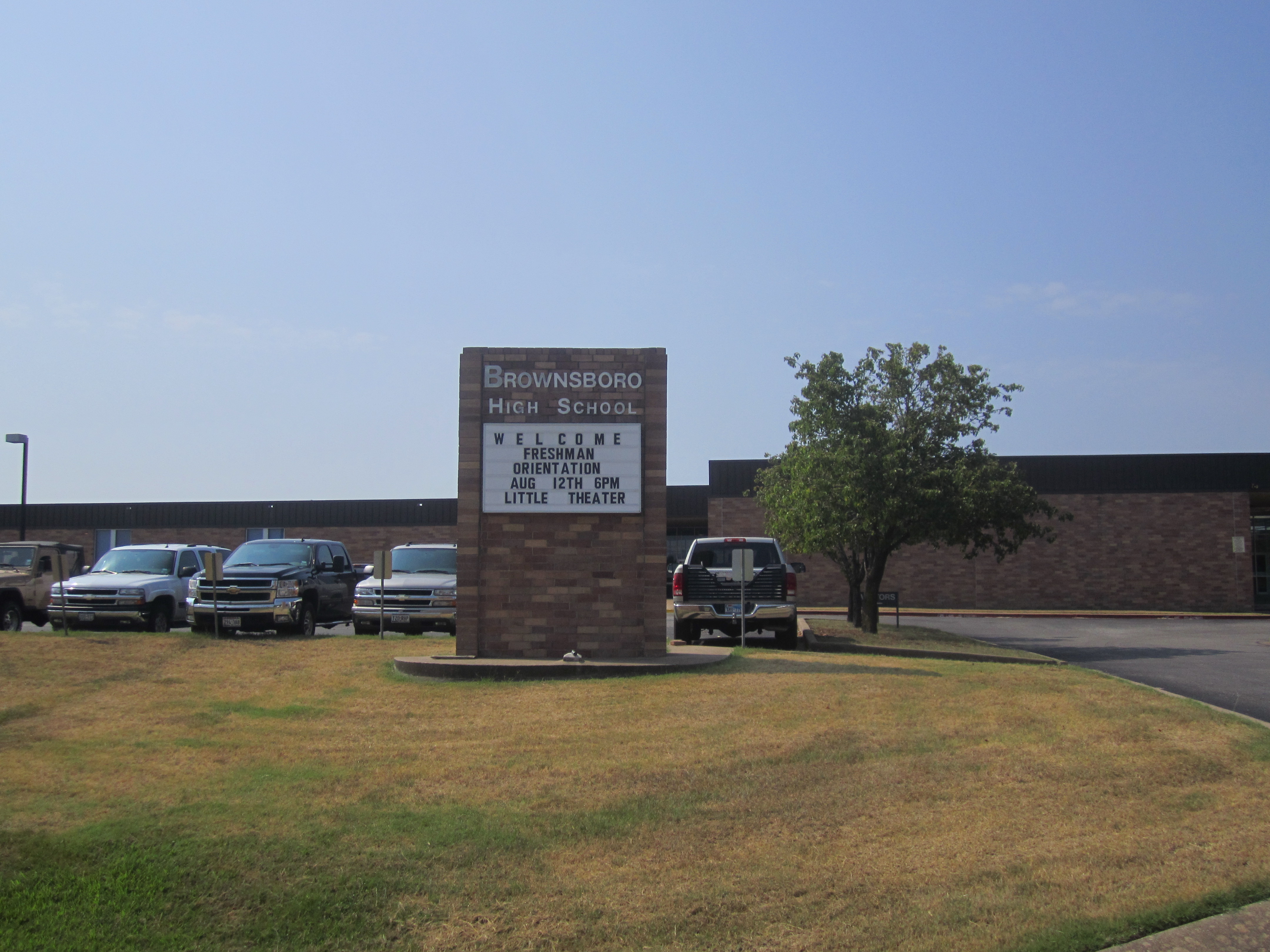
- Brownsboro High School
- Interactive map of Brownsboro, Texas
- Coordinates: 32°17′54″N 95°36′49″W
- Country: United States
- State: Texas
- County: Henderson
- Named for: John "Red" Brown

Area
  - Total: 2.37 sq mi (6.15 km^{2})
  - Land: 2.37 sq mi (6.15 km^{2})
  - Water: 0 sq mi (0.00 km^{2})
- Elevation: 400 ft (120 m)

Population (2020)
  - Total: 1,212
  - Density: 539.1/sq mi (208.13/km^{2})
- Time zone: UTC-6 (Central (CST))
  - Summer (DST): UTC-5 (CDT)
- ZIP code: 75756
- Area codes: 903, 430
- FIPS code: 48-10756
- GNIS feature ID: 2409922
- Website: brownsborotx.gov

Brownsboro is a city in Henderson County, Texas, United States. The population was 1,212 at the 2020 census, up from 1,039 at the 2010 census. The city is on Texas State Highway 31.

== History ==
Brownsboro was first settled in 1849 by John "Red" Brown, who operated a toll bridge across Kickapoo Creek on the road to Jordan's Saline and Tyler. He had received a state issued license to operate a bridge near the town of Old Normandy. By 1860, Henry Cade had erected a sawmill and a cotton gin. With the construction of the St. Louis Southwestern Railway through the county in 1880, the town moved to the railroad.

The town of Old Normandy was near the site of present-day Brownsboro. It was established in 1845 by Johan Reinert Reiersen of Kristiansand, Norway, who urged Norwegian immigrants to settle in the new community. In the summer of 1847, a number of settlers died and many of the Norwegian immigrants moved to Four Mile Prairie in Van Zandt County and Prairieville in Kaufman County, also established by Reiersen.

A Norwegian Lutheran church and cemetery were established in Normandy in 1853, but after that the community merged into the Brownsboro settlement. A nearby Lutheran church served as the chapel for the cemetery until the 1920s.

== Geography ==
Brownsboro is located in northeastern Henderson County. Texas State Highway 31 passes through the city, leading east 19 miles (31 km) to Tyler and southwest 16 miles (26 km) to Athens, the Henderson county seat.

According to the United States Census Bureau, Brownsboro has a total area of 2.4 square miles (6.1 km^{2}), all land. The city is on the south side of the valley of Kickapoo Creek, an eastward-flowing tributary of the Neches River.

== Demographics ==
Historical population
Census	Pop.	Note	%±
1940	640		—
1950	518		−19.1%
1960	507		−2.1%
1970	474		−6.5%
1980	582		22.8%
1990	545		−6.4%
2000	796		46.1%
2010	1,039		30.5%
2020	1,212		16.7%
U.S. Decennial Census

=== 2020 census ===
Brownsboro racial composition as of 2020 (NH = Non-Hispanic) (Note: Note: the US Census treats Hispanic/Latino as an ethnic category. This table excludes Latinos from the racial categories and assigns them to a separate category. Hispanics/Latinos can be of any race.)
Race	Number	Percentage			
White (NH)	877	72.36%			
Black or African American (NH)	58	4.79%			
Native American or Alaska Native (NH)	7	0.58%			
Asian (NH)	3	0.25%			
Some Other Race (NH)	4	0.33%			
Mixed/Multi-Racial (NH)	53	4.37%	Hispanic or Latino	210	17.33%
Total	1,212				

As of the 2020 census, Brownsboro had a population of 1,212, 453 households, and 421 families residing in the city.

The median age was 33.0 years. 27.4% of residents were under the age of 18 and 12.7% of residents were 65 years of age or older. For every 100 females there were 91.2 males, and for every 100 females age 18 and over there were 85.7 males age 18 and over.

0% of residents lived in urban areas, while 100.0% lived in rural areas.

Of the 453 households, 38.9% had children under the age of 18 living in them. Of all households, 48.8% were married-couple households, 18.5% were households with a male householder and no spouse or partner present, and 25.8% were households with a female householder and no spouse or partner present. About 21.2% of all households were made up of individuals and 9.0% had someone living alone who was 65 years of age or older.

There were 509 housing units, of which 11.0% were vacant. Among occupied housing units, 59.6% were owner-occupied and 40.4% were renter-occupied. The homeowner vacancy rate was 2.8% and the rental vacancy rate was 9.4%.

Racial composition as of the 2020 census
Race	Percent
White	77.3%
Black or African American	4.8%
American Indian and Alaska Native	1.4%
Asian	0.2%
Native Hawaiian and Other Pacific Islander	0%
Some other race	8.1%
Two or more races	8.2%
Hispanic or Latino (of any race)	17.3%

=== 2010 census ===
As of the census of 2010, there were 1,039 people, 291 households, and 220 families residing in the city. The population density was 407.0 inhabitants per square mile (157.1/km^{2}). There were 323 housing units at an average density of 165.2 per square mile (63.8/km^{2}). The racial makeup of the city was 95.73% White, 1.38% African American, 0.50% Native American, 0.88% from other races, and 1.51% from two or more races. Hispanic or Latino of any race were 5.28% of the population.

There were 291 households, out of which 44.7% had children under the age of 18 living with them, 57.4% were married couples living together, 15.5% had a female householder with no husband present, and 24.1% were non-families. 21.6% of all households were made up of individuals, and 11.3% had someone living alone who was 65 years of age or older. The average household size was 2.74 and the average family size was 3.15.

In the city, the population was spread out, with 33.0% under the age of 18, 7.7% from 18 to 24, 28.1% from 25 to 44, 18.1% from 45 to 64, and 13.1% who were 65 years of age or older. The median age was 32 years. For every 100 females, there were 87.7 males. For every 100 females age 18 and over, there were 85.1 males.

The median income for a household in the city was $28,542, and the median income for a family was $29,844. Males had a median income of $25,729 versus $21,125 for females. The per capita income for the city was $14,851. About 20.8% of families and 22.0% of the population were below the poverty line, including 27.5% of those under age 18 and 7.7% of those age 65 or over.

== Education ==
The city is served by the Brownsboro Independent School District.
