= Texas Exes =

Alumnus organization of the University of Texas at Austin

The Ex-Students' Association of The University of Texas
- 2008 Texas Exes logo, with slogan
- Abbreviation: Texas Exes
- Founded: June 18, 1885; 140 years ago
- Type: 501(c)(3) organization
- Purpose: Alumni association
- Headquarters: Austin, Texas
- Director: Todd Maclin
- Affiliations: University of Texas at Austin
- Website: texasexes.org

The Ex-Students' Association of The University of Texas (more commonly known as Texas Exes) is the association of former students of the University of Texas at Austin.

The organization is one of the largest alumni associations in the world (the Texas Exes Houston Chapter has over 10,000 members), with chapters in 69 Texas cities, most U.S. states and the District of Columbia, and several foreign countries. The Texas Exes publish a magazine called The Alcalde. Its first female member was Jessie Andrews, who also became the first female instructor at the university, and for whom Andrews dormitory is named.

The alumni association is headquartered in the Alumni Center, adjacent to Darrell K Royal–Texas Memorial Stadium on the university campus. The alumni center hosts gatherings coinciding with home football games and also organizes traveling groups for away events.

The Texas Exes are actively involved in funding scholarships for students at the university.

== See also ==
- List of University of Texas at Austin people
