= Burrell P. Smith =

American politician

Member of the Texas House of Representatives from the 1st district
- In office November 5, 1849 – November 3, 1851
- Preceded by: District created
- Succeeded by: Napoleon Bonaparte Charlton

Personal details
- Born: October 25, 1823 Rutherford, Tennessee, United States
- Died: August 11, 1859 (aged 35) Sherman, Texas, USA
- Spouse(s): Sally Henderson (January 22, 1830– October 19, 1902)

Burrell Perry Smith (born October 23, 1823, in Rutherford, Tennessee) was a politician who served in the Texas House of Representatives for District 1 from late 1849 to late 1851. He decided to run for the 1st district seat of the Texas House of Representatives during the 3rd legislature, and won. He served in the Texas House from 1849 to 1851, retiring from politics thereafter.

Smith married Sally Henderson on July 12, 1848, in Clarksville, Texas. They had four children. He died on August 11, 1859, from a hemorrhage of the lungs, less than 10 years after his first daughter was born.
