= The Alcalde =

Alumni magazine of the University of Texas at Austin

- Categories: Alumni magazine
- Frequency: Bimonthly
- Founded: 1913
- Company: Texas Exes
- Country: United States
- Based in: Austin, Texas
- Language: English
- Website: alcalde.texasexes.org
- ISSN: 1535-993X

The Alcalde (/ælˈkældi/; Spanish: [alˈkalde]) has been the alumni magazine of The University of Texas at Austin since 1913, and is published by the university's alumni association, the Texas Exes.

The magazine was named for Oran M. Roberts, the governor who signed the university into existence and whose nickname was "Old Alcalde."

It is published six times a year and mailed to the 96,000 members of the Texas Exes.
