= Napoleon Bonaparte Charlton =

American politician (1815–1896)

Member of the Texas House of Representatives from the Liberty district
- In office February 16, 1846 – December 13, 1847
- Preceded by: Edward Thomas Branch
- Succeeded by: John H. Davis

Member of the Texas House of Representatives from the 23rd district
- In office November 5, 1849 – November 3, 1851
- Preceded by: District created
- Succeeded by: Robert H. Lane

Member of the Texas House of Representatives from the 1st district
- In office November 3, 1851 – November 7, 1853
- Preceded by: Burrell P. Smith
- Succeeded by: Hardin Richard Runnels

Member of the Texas House of Representatives from the 34th district
- In office November 7, 1853 – November 2, 1857
- Preceded by: Oliver Cromwell Hartley
- Succeeded by: James Gautney Collier

Member of the Texas House of Representatives from the 3rd district
- In office February 6, 1863 – November 2, 1863
- Preceded by: John Thomas Bean
- Succeeded by: James Walter Barclay, Sr.

10th Representative of the Texas Senate, District 2
- In office November 2, 1863 – August 6, 1866
- Preceded by: Anderson Floyd Crawford
- Succeeded by: William M. Neyland

Personal details
- Born: May 13, 1815 Sumner County, Tennessee, US
- Died: June 17, 1896 (aged 81) Tyler, Texas, US
- Spouses: Sarah Foster; Susan McAlister; Brown Charlton
- Children: 5
- Parents: James Charlton; Rachel Blackmore

Napoleon Bonaparte Charlton (May 13, 1815 – June 17, 1896) was an American politician who served in the Texas House of Representatives and Texas Senate from early 1846 to late 1866.

== Biography ==
Napoleon was born on May 13, 1815, in Sumner County, Tennessee, to James and Rachel Charlton (née Blackmore). He is one of 10 children. He also had 5 children, 3 boys and 2 girls. He died on June 17, 1896, aged 83, in Tyler, Texas.

== Politics ==
Charlton served many terms in the Texas House and Texas Senate.

Here is a list of his services:

- House of Representatives
  - 1st representative of the Texas House of Representatives, District Liberty (February 16, 1846 – December 13, 1847)
  - 3rd representative of the Texas House of Representatives, District 23 (November 5, 1849 – November 3, 1851)
  - 4th representative of the Texas House of Representatives, District 1 (November 3, 1851 – November 7, 1853)
  - 5th representative of the Texas House of Representatives, District 34 (November 7, 1853 – November 5, 1855)
  - 6th representative of the Texas House of Representatives, District 34 (November 5, 1855 – November 2, 1857)
  - 9th representative of the Texas House of Representatives, District 3 (February 6, 1863 – November 2, 1863)
- Senate
  - 10th representative of the Texas Senate, District 2 (November 2, 1863 – August 6, 1866)
