= Bailey's Prairie, Texas =

- Village
- Interactive map of Bailey's Prairie, Texas
- Coordinates: 29°9′29″N 95°29′28″W
- Country: United States
- State: Texas
- County: Brazoria

Area
  - Total: 7.20 sq mi (18.65 km^{2})
  - Land: 6.98 sq mi (18.09 km^{2})
  - Water: 0.22 sq mi (0.56 km^{2})
- Elevation: 30 ft (9 m)

Population (2020)
  - Total: 775
  - Density: 111/sq mi (42.8/km^{2})
- Time zone: UTC-6 (Central (CST))
  - Summer (DST): UTC-5 (CDT)
- ZIP code: 77515
- Area code: 979
- FIPS code: 48-05288
- GNIS feature ID: 1351418
- Website: baileysprairie.org

Bailey's Prairie is a village in Brazoria County in the southeastern portion of the U.S. state of Texas. The population was 775 at the time of the 2020 U.S. census. Established in 1818, the village is named for the pioneer James Briton "Brit" Bailey (1779–1832).

== Geography ==
Bailey's Prairie is located in central Brazoria County. Texas State Highway 35 runs through the town, leading east 5 miles (8 km) to Angleton, the county seat, and west 8 miles (13 km) to West Columbia.

According to the United States Census Bureau, the village has a total area of 7.7 square miles (19.9 km^{2}), of which 7.5 square miles (19.3 km^{2}) is land and 2.2 square miles (5.8 km^{2}), or 2.90%, is water.

== Demographics ==
Historical population
| Census | Pop. | Note | %± |
|---|---|---|---|
| 1970 | 228 | | — |
| 1980 | 353 | | 54.8% |
| 1990 | 634 | | 79.6% |
| 2000 | 694 | | 9.5% |
| 2010 | 727 | | 4.8% |
| 2020 | 775 | | 6.6% |
U.S. Decennial Census; 2020 Census

As of the census of 2000, there were 694 people, 237 households, and 201 families residing in the village. The population density was 92.4 inhabitants per square mile (35.7/km^{2}). There were 244 housing units at an average density of 32.5 units per square mile (12.5 units/km^{2}). The racial makeup of the village was 80.84% White, 14.12% African American, 0.86% Native American, 0.14% Asian, 0.43% Pacific Islander, 2.02% from other races, and 1.59% from two or more races. Hispanic or Latino of any race were 10.09% of the population.

There were 237 households, out of which 35.4% had children under the age of 18 living with them, 77.6% were married couples living together, 6.3% had a female householder with no husband present, and 14.8% were non-families. 13.1% of all households were made up of individuals, and 4.6% had someone living alone who was 65 years of age or older. The average household size was 2.93 and the average family size was 3.18.

In the village, the population was spread out, with 26.4% under the age of 18, 7.8% from 18 to 24, 24.4% from 25 to 44, 33.9% from 45 to 64, and 7.6% who were 65 years of age or older. The median age was 40 years. For every 100 females, there were 104.1 males. For every 100 females age 18 and over, there were 98.8 males.

The median income for a household in the village was $73,125, and the median income for a family was $90,648. Males had a median income of $47,083 versus $29,609 for females. The per capita income for the village was $32,267. About 1.9% of families and 4.3% of the population were below the poverty line, including 2.6% of those under age 18 and 4.9% of those age 65 or over.

== Education ==
Bailey's Prairie is zoned to schools in the Angleton Independent School District, including Angleton High School.

The Texas Legislature designated portions of Angleton ISD that by September 1, 1995, had not been annexed by Alvin Community College as in the Brazosport College zone. As Bailey's Prairie is not in the maps of Alvin CC, it is in the Brazosport College zone.

== See also ==
- List of villages in Texas
