= Speaker of the Texas House of Representatives =

Presiding officer of the Texas House of Representatives

Speaker of the House of Representatives of Texas
- Seal of the Speaker

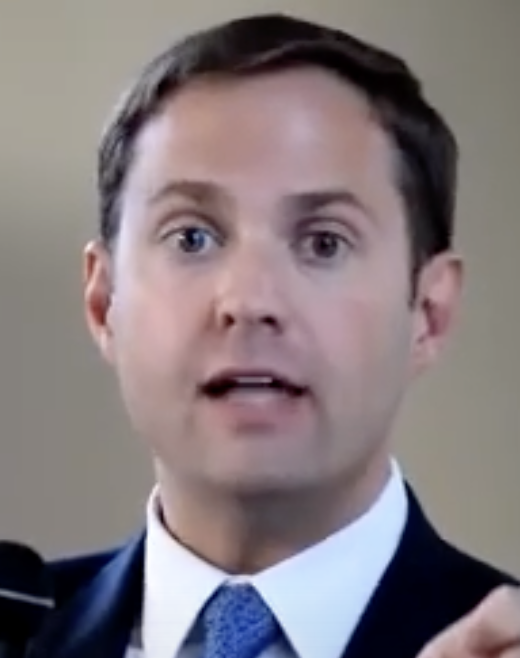
- Incumbent; Dustin Burrows since January 14, 2025
- Style: The Honorable
- Term length: Two years, no term limits
- Inaugural holder: William Crump; 1849
- Formation: Texas Constitution

The speaker of the Texas House of Representatives is the presiding officer of the Texas House of Representatives. The Speaker's main duties are to conduct meetings of the House, appoint committees, and enforce the Rules of the House. The current speaker of the house is Dustin Burrows, a Republican from Lubbock, who was elected Speaker on January 14, 2025.

== Election ==
The speaker is elected by a majority of the Texas House of Representatives from its membership. On the first day of each regular session, the Secretary of State calls the House to order, and administers the oath of office to the new members. Once the members are sworn in, the Secretary presides over the chamber until the election of a Speaker.

Before the vote for Speaker, informal campaigning and coalition-building often take place among House members. Prospective candidates for Speaker may seek pledges of support from fellow legislators in the weeks or months leading up to the legislative session. These pledges are typically made public through letters filed with the Chief Clerk of the House. Although the election process itself is formal and occurs on the House floor, the outcome is often determined in advance through these behind-the-scenes negotiations and political alliances.

== Duties ==
The speaker is the presiding officer of the House of Representatives. The Texas Constitution requires the House of Representatives, each time a new legislature convenes, to choose one of its own members to serve as Speaker.

As presiding officer, the Speaker maintains order during floor debate, recognizing legislators who wish to speak and ruling on procedural matters. The constitution also requires the Speaker to sign all bills and joint resolutions passed by the legislature. As a member of the House of Representatives, the Speaker may vote on all questions before the House.

The other duties and responsibilities of the Speaker are determined by the members of the house in the House Rules of Procedure, which are adopted by a majority vote of the members at the beginning of each regular session of the legislature. Under House rules, the Speaker appoints committee chairs, vice chairs, and members, and is responsible for referring all bills to committees. These powers that are given to the Speaker has significant control over which legislation advances. The members give the Speaker the authority to appoint the membership of each standing committee, subject to rules on seniority, and to designate the chair and vice chair for each committee. Under the rules, the Speaker is responsible for referring all proposed legislation to committee, subject to the committee jurisdictions set forth in the rules. The rules also allow the Speaker to appoint conference committees, to create select committees, and to direct committees to conduct interim studies when the legislature is not in session.

== See also ==
- List of speakers of the Texas House of Representatives
