= Texas annexation =

1845 admission of Texas to the US

Boundaries of Texas after the annexation of 1845

The Texas annexation was the incorporation of the Republic of Texas into the United States by joint resolution of Congress, culminating in its admission to the Union as the 28th state on December 29, 1845.

The Republic of Texas declared independence from the Republic of Mexico on March 2, 1836. It applied for annexation to the United States the same year, but was rejected by the United States secretary of state, John Forsyth, under President Andrew Jackson. At that time, the majority of the Texian population favored the annexation of the Republic by the United States. The leadership of both major U.S. political parties (the Democrats and the Whigs) opposed the introduction of Texas – a vast slave-holding region – into the volatile political climate of the pro- and anti-slavery sectional controversies in Congress. Moreover, they wished to avoid a war with Mexico, whose government had outlawed slavery and refused to acknowledge the sovereignty of its rebellious northern province. With Texas's economic fortunes declining by the early 1840s, the president of the Texas Republic, Sam Houston, arranged talks with Mexico to explore the possibility of securing official recognition of independence, with the United Kingdom mediating.

In 1843, U.S. president John Tyler, then unaligned with any political party, decided independently to pursue the annexation of Texas in a bid to gain a base of support for another four years in office. His official motivation was to outmaneuver suspected diplomatic efforts by the British government for the emancipation of slaves in Texas, which would undermine slavery in the United States. Through secret negotiations with the Houston administration, Tyler secured a treaty of annexation in April 1844. When the documents were submitted to the U.S. Senate for ratification, the details of the terms of annexation became public and the question of acquiring Texas took center stage in the presidential election of 1844. Pro-Texas-annexation southern Democratic delegates denied their anti-annexation leader Martin Van Buren the nomination at their party's convention in May 1844. In alliance with pro-expansion northern Democratic colleagues, they secured the nomination of James K. Polk, who ran on a pro-Texas Manifest destiny platform.

In June 1844, the Senate, with its Whig majority, soundly rejected the Tyler–Texas treaty. Later that year, the pro-annexation Democrat Polk narrowly defeated anti-annexation Whig Henry Clay in the 1844 presidential election. In December 1844, lame-duck President Tyler called on Congress to pass his treaty by simple majorities in each house. The Democratic-dominated House of Representatives complied with his request by passing an amended bill expanding on the pro-slavery provisions of the Tyler treaty. The Senate narrowly passed a compromise version of the House bill, designed to provide President-elect Polk the options of immediate annexation of Texas or new talks to revise the annexation terms of the House-amended bill.

On March 1, 1845, President Tyler signed the annexation bill, and on March 3 (his last full-day in office), he forwarded the House version to Texas, offering immediate annexation. When Polk took office at noon (EST) the next day, he encouraged Texas to accept Tyler's offer. Texas ratified the agreement with popular approval from Texans. The bill was signed by President Polk on December 29, 1845, accepting Texas as the 28th state of the Union. Texas formally joined the union on February 19, 1846, prompting the Mexican–American War in April of that year.

== Background information ==
=== U.S. territorial expansion and Texas ===
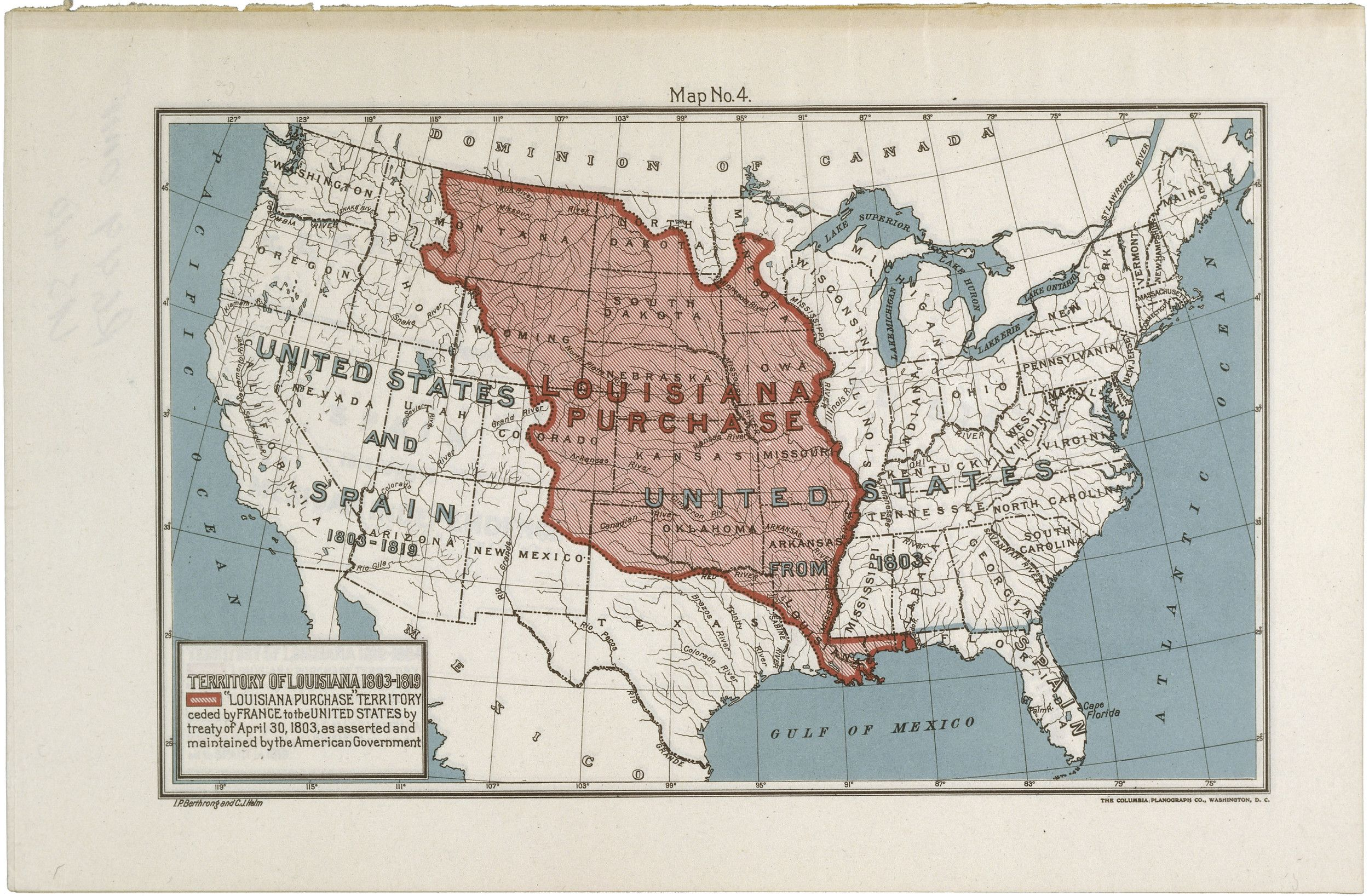
Louisiana Purchase boundaries of 1803

First mapped by Spain in 1519, for over 300 years Texas was part of the vast Spanish Empire seized by the Spanish conquistadores from its indigenous people. The US–Spain border along the northern frontier of Texas took shape in the 1817–1819 negotiations between Secretary of State John Quincy Adams and the Spanish ambassador to the United States, Luis de Onís. The boundaries of Texas were determined within the larger geostrategic struggle to demark the limits of the United States' extensive western lands and of Spain's vast possessions in North America. The Florida Purchase Treaty of February 22, 1819 emerged as a compromise that excluded Spain from the lower Columbia River drainage basin, but established southern boundaries at the Sabine and Red Rivers, "legally extinguish[ing]" any American claims to Texas. Nonetheless, Texas remained an object of fervent interest to American expansionists, among them Thomas Jefferson, who anticipated the eventual acquisition of its fertile lands.

The Missouri crisis of 1819–1821 sharpened commitments to expansionism among the country's slaveholding interests, when the so-called Thomas proviso established the 36°30' parallel, imposing free-soil and slave-soil futures in the Louisiana Purchase lands. While a majority of southern congressmen acquiesced to the exclusion of slavery from the bulk of the Louisiana Purchase, a significant minority objected. Virginian editor Thomas Ritchie of the Richmond Enquirer predicted that with the proviso restrictions, the South would ultimately require Texas: "If we are cooped up on the north, we must have elbow room to the west." Representative John Floyd of Virginia in 1824 accused Secretary of State Adams of conceding Texas to Spain in 1819 in the interests of Northern anti-slavery advocates, and so depriving the South of additional slave states. Then-representative John Tyler of Virginia invoked the Jeffersonian precepts of territorial and commercial growth as a national goal to counter the rise of sectional differences over slavery. His "diffusion" theory declared that with Missouri open to slavery, the new state would encourage the transfer of underutilized slaves westward, emptying the eastern states of bondsmen and making emancipation feasible in the old South. This doctrine would be revived during the Texas annexation controversy.

When Mexico won its independence from Spain in 1821, the United States did not contest the new republic's claims to Texas, and both presidents John Quincy Adams (1825–1829) and Andrew Jackson (1829–1837) persistently sought, through official and unofficial channels, to procure all or portions of provincial Texas from the Mexican government, without success.

=== Texas settlement and independence ===
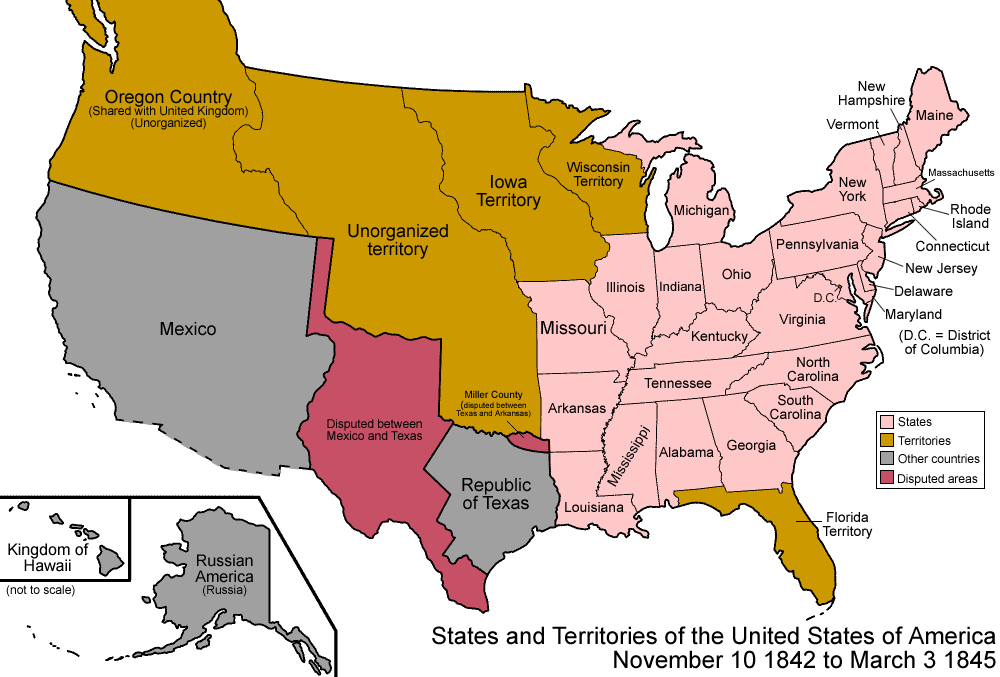
The boundaries of the United States and neighboring nations as they appeared in 1843

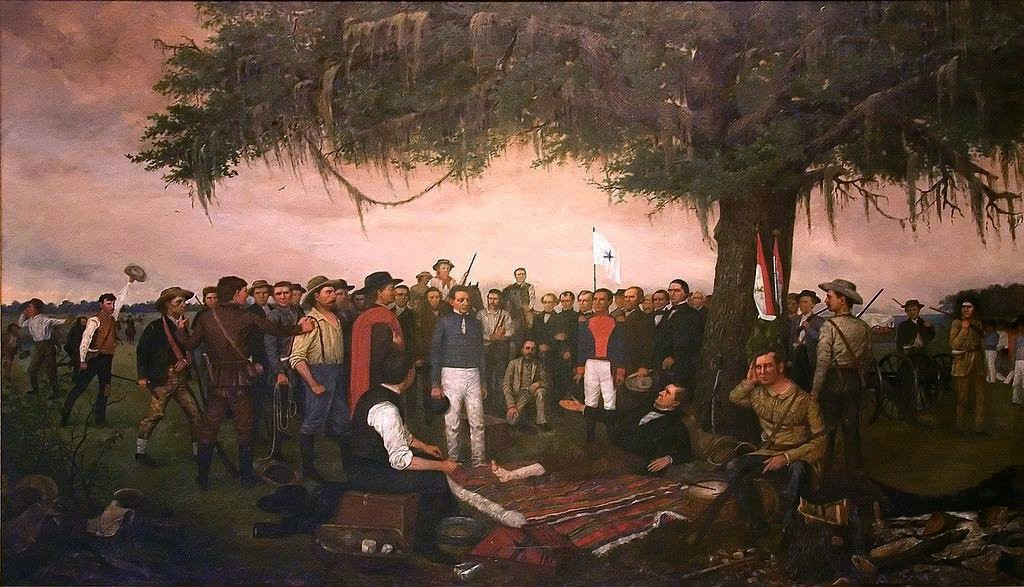
Mexican General López de Santa Anna's surrender to Sam Houston

Spanish and indigenous immigrants, primarily from northeastern provinces of New Spain, began to settle Texas in the late 17th century. The Spanish constructed Catholic missions and presidios in what is today Louisiana, east Texas, and south Texas. The first missions were designed for the Tejas Indians, near Los Adaes. Soon thereafter, the San Antonio Missions were founded along the San Antonio River. The City of San Antonio, then known as San Fernando de Bexar, was founded in 1718. In the early 1760s, José de Escandón created five settlements along the Rio Grande River, including Laredo.

Anglo-American immigrants, primarily from the Southern United States, began emigrating to Mexican Texas in the early 1820s at the invitation of the Texas faction of the Coahuila y Tejas state government, which sought to populate the sparsely inhabited lands of its northern frontier for cotton production. Colonizing empresario Stephen F. Austin managed the regional affairs of the mostly American-born population – 20% of them slaves – under the terms of the generous government land grants. Mexican authorities were initially content to govern the remote province through salutary neglect, "permitting slavery under the legal fiction of 'permanent indentured servitude', similar to Mexico's peonage system.

A general lawlessness prevailed in the vast Texas frontier, and Mexico's laws went largely unenforced among the Anglo-American settlers. In particular, the prohibitions against slavery and forced labor, as well as the requirement that all settlers be Catholic or convert to Catholicism were ignored. Mexican authorities, perceiving that they were losing control over Texas and alarmed by the unsuccessful Fredonian Rebellion of 1826, abandoned the policy of benign rule. New restrictions were imposed in 1829–1830, outlawing slavery throughout the nation and terminating further American immigration to Texas. Military occupation followed, sparking local uprisings. Texas conventions in 1832 and 1833 submitted petitions for redress of grievances to overturn the restrictions, with limited success. In 1835, an army under Mexican President Santa Anna entered its territory of Texas and abolished self-government. Texians responded by declaring their independence from Mexico on March 2, 1836. On April 20–21, rebel forces under Texas General Sam Houston defeated the Mexican army at the Battle of San Jacinto. In June 1836 while held prisoner by the Texians, Santa Anna signed an agreement for Texas independence, but the Mexican government refused to ratify the agreement made under duress. Texians, now de facto independent, recognized that their security and prosperity could never be achieved while Mexico denied the legitimacy of their revolution.

In the years following independence, the migration of white settlers and importation of black slave labor into the vast republic was deterred by Texas's unresolved international status and the threat of renewed warfare with Mexico. American citizens who considered migrating to the new republic perceived that "life and property were safer within the United States" than in an independent Texas. In the 1840s, global oversupply had also caused a crash in the price of cotton, the country's main export commodity. The situation led to labor shortages, reduced tax revenue, large national debts and a diminished Texas militia.

== Jackson and Van Buren administrations ==
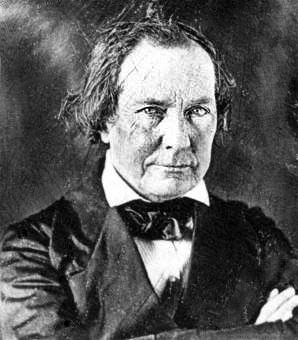
Mirabeau B. Lamar, second president of the Republic of Texas, terminated annexation efforts with the Martin Van Buren Administration in 1838.

The Anglo-American immigrants residing in newly independent Texas overwhelmingly desired immediate annexation by the United States. But, despite his strong support for Texas independence from Mexico, then-president Andrew Jackson delayed recognizing the new republic until the last day of his presidency to avoid raising the issue during the 1836 general election. Jackson's political caution was dictated by northern concerns that Texas could potentially form several new slave states and undermine the North-South balance in Congress.

Jackson's successor, President Martin Van Buren, viewed Texas annexation as an immense political liability that would empower the anti-slavery northern Whig opposition – especially if annexation provoked a war with Mexico. Presented with a formal annexation proposal from Texas minister Memucan Hunt Jr. in August 1837, Van Buren summarily rejected it. Annexation resolutions presented separately in each house of Congress were either soundly defeated or tabled through filibuster. In 1838, Texas president Mirabeau B. Lamar withdrew his republic's offer of annexation over these failures. Texians were at an annexation impasse when John Tyler entered the White House in 1841.

== Tyler administration ==
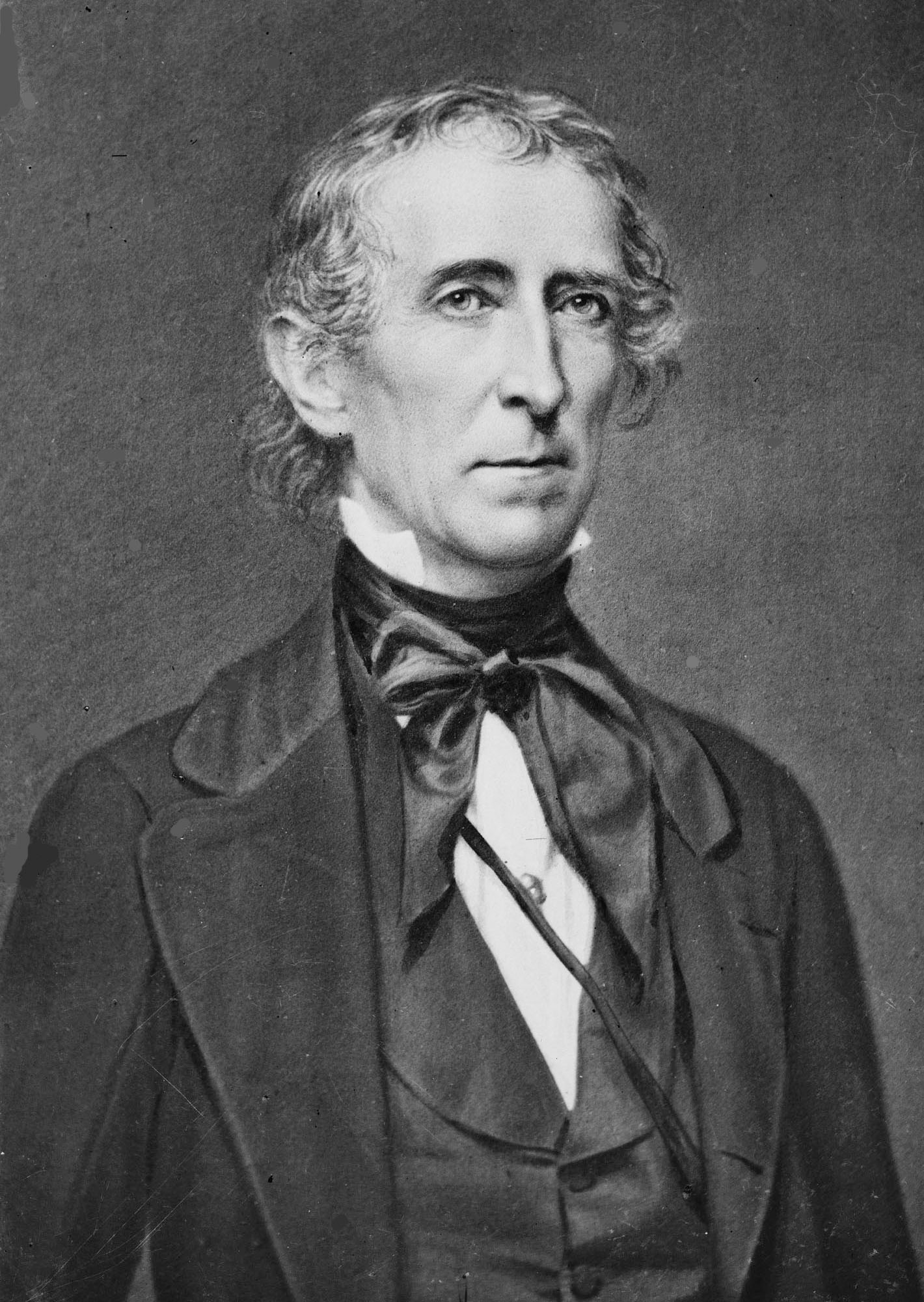
US President John Tyler, champion of Texas annexation

William Henry Harrison, Whig Party presidential nominee, defeated US president Martin Van Buren in the 1840 general election. Upon Harrison's death shortly after his inauguration, Vice President John Tyler assumed the presidency. President Tyler was expelled from the Whig party in 1841 for repeatedly vetoing their domestic finance legislation. Tyler, isolated and outside the two-party mainstream, turned to foreign affairs to salvage his presidency, aligning himself with a southern states' rights faction that shared his fervent slavery expansionist views.

In his first address to Congress in special session on June 1, 1841, Tyler set the stage for Texas annexation by announcing his intention to pursue an expansionist agenda so as to preserve the balance between state and national authority and to protect American institutions, including slavery, so as to avoid sectional conflict. Tyler's closest advisors counseled him that obtaining Texas would assure him a second term in the White House, and it became a deeply personal obsession for the president, who viewed the acquisition of Texas as the "primary objective of his administration". Tyler delayed direct action on Texas to work closely with his Secretary of State Daniel Webster on other pressing diplomatic initiatives.

With the Webster–Ashburton Treaty ratified in 1843, Tyler was ready to make the annexation of Texas his "top priority". Representative Thomas W. Gilmer of Virginia was authorized by the administration to make the case for annexation to the American electorate. In a widely circulated open letter, understood as an announcement of the executive branch's designs for Texas, Gilmer described Texas as a panacea for North-South conflict and an economic boon to all commercial interests. The slavery issue, however divisive, would be left for the states to decide as per the US Constitution. Domestic tranquility and national security, Tyler argued, would result from an annexed Texas; a Texas left outside American jurisdiction would imperil the Union. Tyler adroitly arranged the resignation of his anti-annexation secretary of state Daniel Webster, and on June 23, 1843 appointed Abel P. Upshur, a Virginia states' rights champion and ardent proponent of Texas annexation. This cabinet shift signaled Tyler's intent to pursue Texas annexation aggressively.

=== Tyler–Upshur–Calhoun campaign for Texas ===
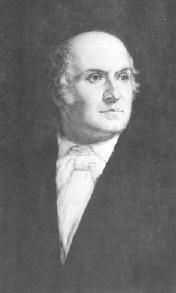
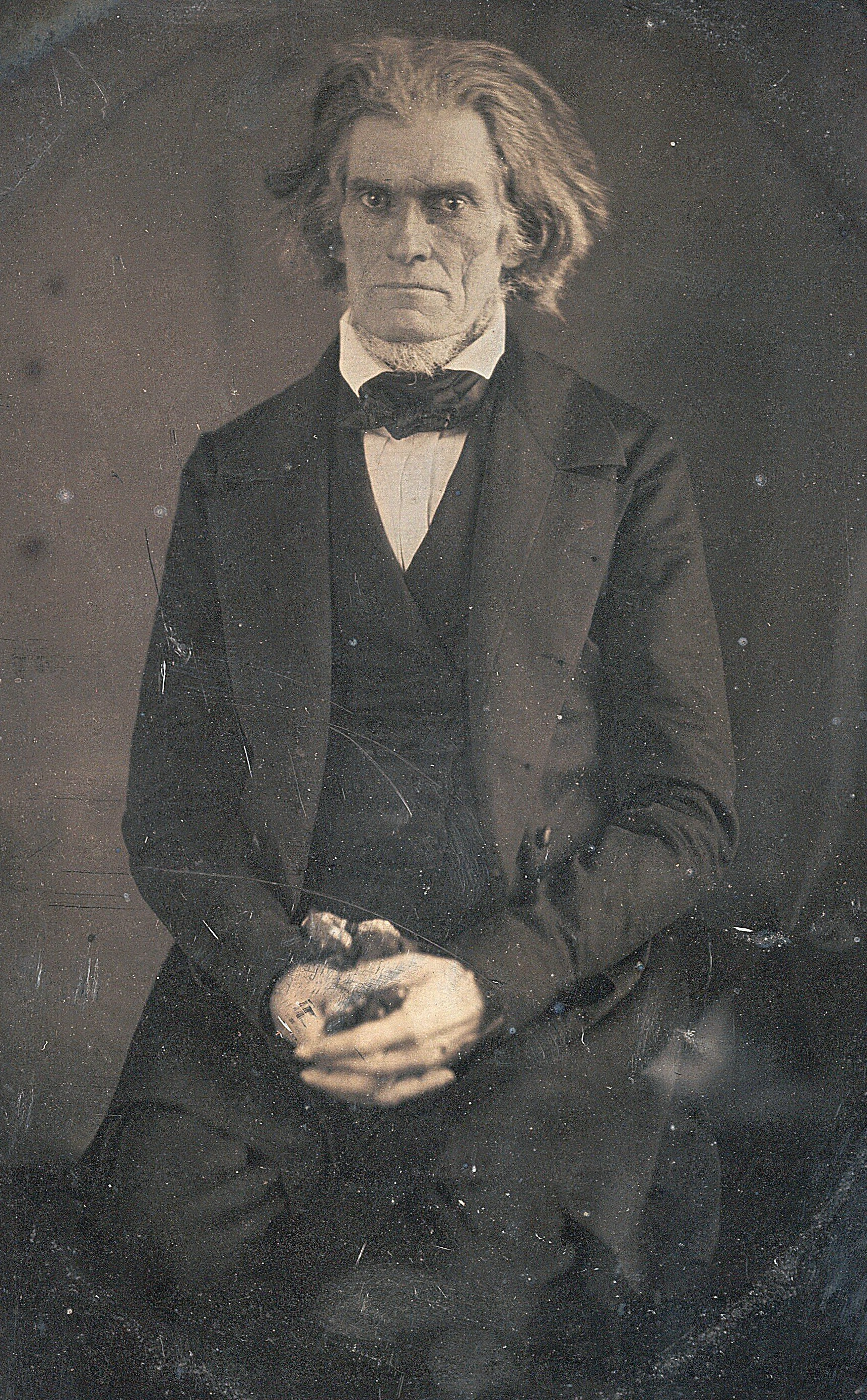
President John Tyler's secretaries of state Abel P. Upshur (left) and John C. Calhoun, who planned to deliver the Tyler-Texas annexation treaty on a pro-southern agenda

In late September 1843, in an effort to cultivate public support for Texas, Secretary Upshur dispatched a letter to the US minister to Great Britain, Edward Everett, conveying his displeasure with Britain's global anti-slavery posture, and warning their government that forays into Texas's affairs would be regarded as "tantamount to direct interference 'with the established institutions of the United States'". In a breach of diplomatic norms, Upshur leaked the communique to the press to inflame popular Anglophobic sentiments among American citizens.

In the spring of 1843, the Tyler administration had sent executive agent Duff Green to Europe to gather intelligence and arrange territorial treaty talks with Great Britain regarding Oregon; he also worked with American minister to France, Lewis Cass, to thwart efforts by major European powers to suppress the maritime slave trade. Green reported to Secretary Upshur in July 1843 that he had discovered a "loan plot" by American abolitionists, in league with Lord Aberdeen, British Foreign Secretary, to provide funds to the Texans in exchange for the emancipation of its slaves. Minister Everett was charged with determining the substance of these confidential reports alleging a Texas plot. His investigations, including personal interviews with Lord Aberdeen, concluded that British interest in abolitionist intrigues was weak, contradicting Secretary of State Upshur's conviction that Great Britain was manipulating Texas. Though unsubstantiated, Green's unofficial intelligence so alarmed Tyler that he requested verification from the US minister to Mexico, Waddy Thompson Jr.

John C. Calhoun of South Carolina, a pro-slavery Democrat, counseled Secretary Upshur that British designs on American slavery were real and required immediate action to preempt a takeover of Texas by the United Kingdom. When Tyler confirmed in September that the British foreign secretary Aberdeen had encouraged détente between Mexico and Texas, allegedly pressing Mexico to maneuver Texas towards emancipation of its slaves, Tyler acted at once. On September 18, 1843, in consultation with Secretary Upshur, he ordered secret talks opened with Texas minister to the United States Isaac Van Zandt to negotiate the annexation of Texas. Face-to-face negotiations commenced on October 16, 1843.

==== Texas–Mexico–United Kingdom negotiations ====
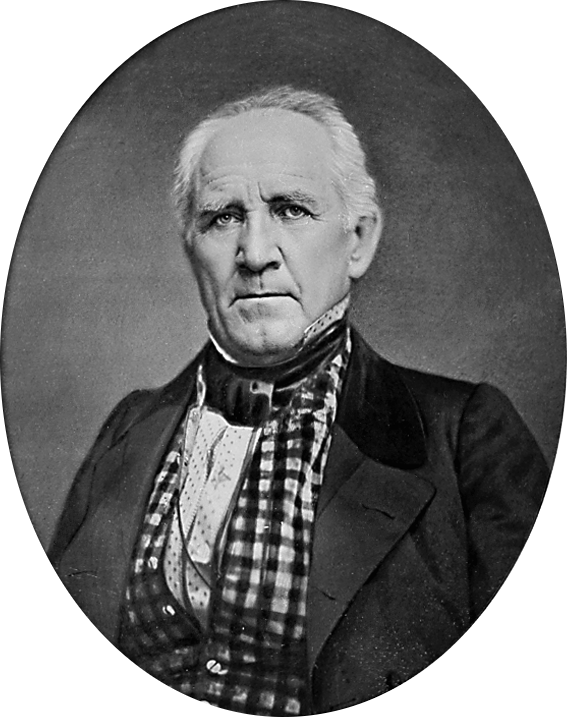
Sam Houston agreed to open annexation negotiations with the Tyler administration in 1843.

By the summer of 1843 Sam Houston's Texas administration had returned to negotiations with the Mexican government to consider a rapprochement that would permit Texas self-governance, possibly as a state of Mexico, with Great Britain acting as mediator. Texas officials felt compelled by the fact that the Tyler administration appeared unequipped to mount an effective campaign for Texas annexation. With the 1844 United States presidential election approaching, the leadership in both the Democratic and Whig parties remained unequivocally opposed to the annexation of Texas. Texas-Mexico treaty options under consideration included an autonomous Texas within Mexico's borders, or an independent republic with the provision that Texas should emancipate its slaves upon recognition.

Van Zandt, though he personally favored annexation by the United States, was not authorized to entertain any overtures from the US government on the subject. Texas officials were at the moment deeply engaged in exploring settlements with Mexican diplomats, facilitated by Great Britain. Texas's predominant concern was not British interference with the institution of slavery – English diplomats had not alluded to the issue – but the avoidance of any resumption of hostilities with Mexico. Still, US Secretary of State Upshur vigorously exhorted Texas diplomats to begin annexation talks, finally dispatching an appeal to President Sam Houston in January 1844. In the appeal, Upshur assured Houston that the political climate in the United States was currently amenable to Texas statehood and that a two-thirds majority in Senate could be obtained to ratify a Texas treaty.

Texans were hesitant to pursue a US-Texas treaty without a written commitment of military defense from America, since a full-scale military attack by Mexico seemed likely when the negotiations became public. If ratification of the annexation measure stalled in the US Senate, Texas could face a war alone against Mexico. Because only Congress could declare war, the Tyler administration lacked the constitutional authority to commit the US to support of Texas. But when Secretary Upshur provided a verbal assurance of military defense, President Houston, responding to urgent calls for annexation from the Texas Congress of December 1843, authorized the reopening of annexation negotiations.

=== The US–Texas treaty negotiations ===
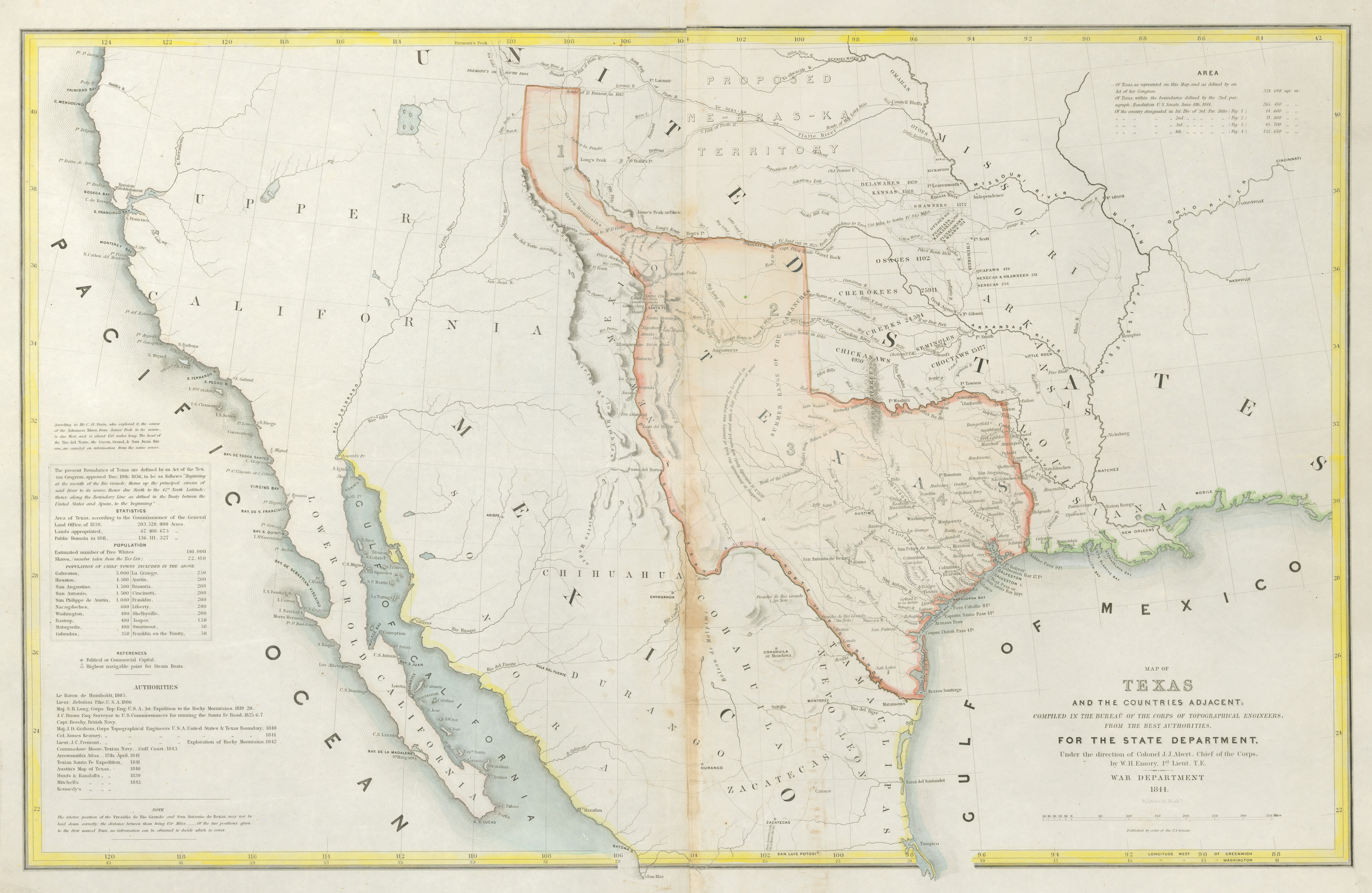
William H. Emory's 1844 Map of Texas and the Countries Adjacent

As Secretary Upshur accelerated the secret treaty discussions, Mexican diplomats learned that US-Texas talks were taking place. Mexican minister to the U.S. Juan Almonte confronted Upshur with these reports, warning him that if Congress sanctioned a treaty of annexation, Mexico would break diplomatic ties and immediately declare war. Secretary Upshur denied any knowledge of these reports and pressed forward with the negotiations. In tandem with moving forward with Texas diplomats, Upshur was secretly lobbying US senators to support annexation, providing lawmakers with persuasive arguments linking Texas acquisition to national security and domestic peace. In early 1844, Upshur assured Texas officials that 40 of the 52 members of the Senate were pledged to ratify the Tyler-Texas treaty – more than the two-thirds majority required for ratification. In his annual address to Congress in December 1843, Tyler maintained his silence with respect to the secret negotiations so as not to damage relations with the wary Texas diplomats. Throughout, Tyler did his utmost to keep the negotiations secret, making no public reference to his administration's single-minded quest for Texas.

The Tyler-Texas treaty was in its final stages when its chief architects, Secretary Upshur and Secretary of the Navy Thomas W. Gilmer, died in an accident aboard USS Princeton on February 28, 1844, just a day after achieving a preliminary treaty draft agreement with the Texas Republic. The Princeton disaster proved a major setback for Texas annexation, in that Tyler expected Secretary Upshur to elicit critical support from Whig and Democratic Senators during the upcoming treaty ratification process. Tyler selected John C. Calhoun to replace Upshur as Secretary of State and to finalize the treaty with Texas. The choice of Calhoun, a highly regarded but controversial American statesman, risked introducing a politically polarizing element into the Texas debates, but Tyler prized him as a strong advocate of annexation.

==== Robert J. Walker and the "safety-valve" ====
With the Tyler-Upshur secret annexation negotiations with Texas near consummation, Senator Robert J. Walker of Mississippi, a key Tyler ally, issued a widely distributed and highly influential letter, reproduced as a pamphlet, making the case for immediate annexation. In it, Walker argued that Texas could be acquired by Congress in a number of ways – all constitutional – and that the moral authority to do so was based on the precepts for territorial expansion established by Jefferson and Madison, and promulgated as doctrine by Monroe in 1823. Senator Walker's polemic offered analysis on the significance of Texas with respect to slavery and race. He envisioned Texas as a corridor through which both free and enslaved African-Americans could be "diffused" southward in a gradual exodus that would ultimately supply labor to the Central American tropics, and in time, empty the United States of its slave population.

This "safety-valve" theory "appealed to the racial fears of northern whites" who dreaded the prospect of absorbing emancipated slaves into their communities if the institution of slavery collapsed in the South. This scheme for racial cleansing was consistent, on a pragmatic level, with proposals for overseas colonization of blacks, which were pursued by a number of American presidents, from Jefferson to Lincoln. Walker bolstered his position by raising national security concerns, warning that in the event annexation failed, Great Britain would maneuver the Republic of Texas into emancipating its slaves, forecasting a dangerous destabilizing influence on southwestern slaveholding states. The pamphlet characterized abolitionists as traitors who conspired with the British to overthrow the United States.

A variation of the Tyler's "diffusion" theory, it played on economic fears in a period when slave-based staple crop markets had not yet recovered from the Panic of 1837. The Texas "escape route" conceived by Walker promised to increase demand for slaves in fertile cotton-growing regions of Texas, as well as the monetary value of slaves. Cash-poor plantation owners in the older eastern South were promised a market for surplus slaves at a profit. Texas annexation, wrote Walker, would eliminate all these dangers and "fortify the whole Union."

Walker's pamphlet brought forth strident demands for Texas from pro-slavery expansionists in the South; in the North, it allowed anti-slavery expansionists to embrace Texas without appearing to be aligned with pro-slavery extremists. His assumptions and analysis "shaped and framed the debates on annexation but his premises went largely unchallenged among the press and public.

== Tyler-Texas treaty and the election of 1844 ==
Tyler-Texas Treaty
Treaty of annexation concluded between the United States of America and the Republic of Texas
- Drafted: February 27, 1844
- Signed: April 12, 1844
- Location: Washington
- Effective: Not ratified
- Signatories: Republic of Texas; United States
- Consent refused by the U.S. Senate (Senate Journal, June 8, 1844, volume 430, pp. 436–438).

The Tyler-Texas treaty, signed on April 12, 1844, was framed to induct Texas into the Union as a territory, following constitutional protocols. To wit, Texas would cede all its public lands to the United States, and the federal government would assume all its bonded debt, up to $10 million. The boundaries of the Texas territory were left unspecified. Four new states could ultimately be carved from the former republic – three of them likely to become slave states. Any allusion to slavery was omitted from the document so as not to antagonize anti-slavery sentiments during Senate debates, but it provided for the "preservation of all [Texas] property as secured in our domestic institutions."

Upon the signing of the treaty, Tyler complied with the Texans' demand for military and naval protection, deploying troops to Fort Jesup in Louisiana and a fleet of warships to the Gulf of Mexico. In case the Senate failed to pass the treaty, Tyler promised the Texas diplomats that he would officially exhort both houses of Congress to establish Texas as a state of the Union upon provisions authorized in the Constitution. Tyler's cabinet was split on the administration's handling of the Texas agreement. Secretary of War William Wilkins praised the terms of annexation publicly, touting the economic and geostrategic benefits with relation to Great Britain. Secretary of the Treasury John C. Spencer was alarmed at the constitutional implications of Tyler's application of military force without congressional approval, a violation of the separation of powers. Refusing to transfer contingency funds for the naval mobilization, he resigned.

Tyler submitted his treaty for annexation to the Senate, delivered April 22, 1844, where a two-thirds majority was required for ratification. Secretary of State Calhoun (assuming his post March 29, 1844) had sent a letter to British minister Richard Packenham denouncing British anti-slavery interference in Texas. He included the Packenham Letter with the Tyler bill, intending to create a sense of crisis in Southern Democrats. In it, he characterized slavery as a social blessing and the acquisition of Texas as an emergency measure necessary to safeguard the "peculiar institution" in the United States. In doing so, Tyler and Calhoun sought to unite the South in a crusade that would present the North with an ultimatum: support Texas annexation or lose the South.

=== Tyler and the Polk presidential nomination ===
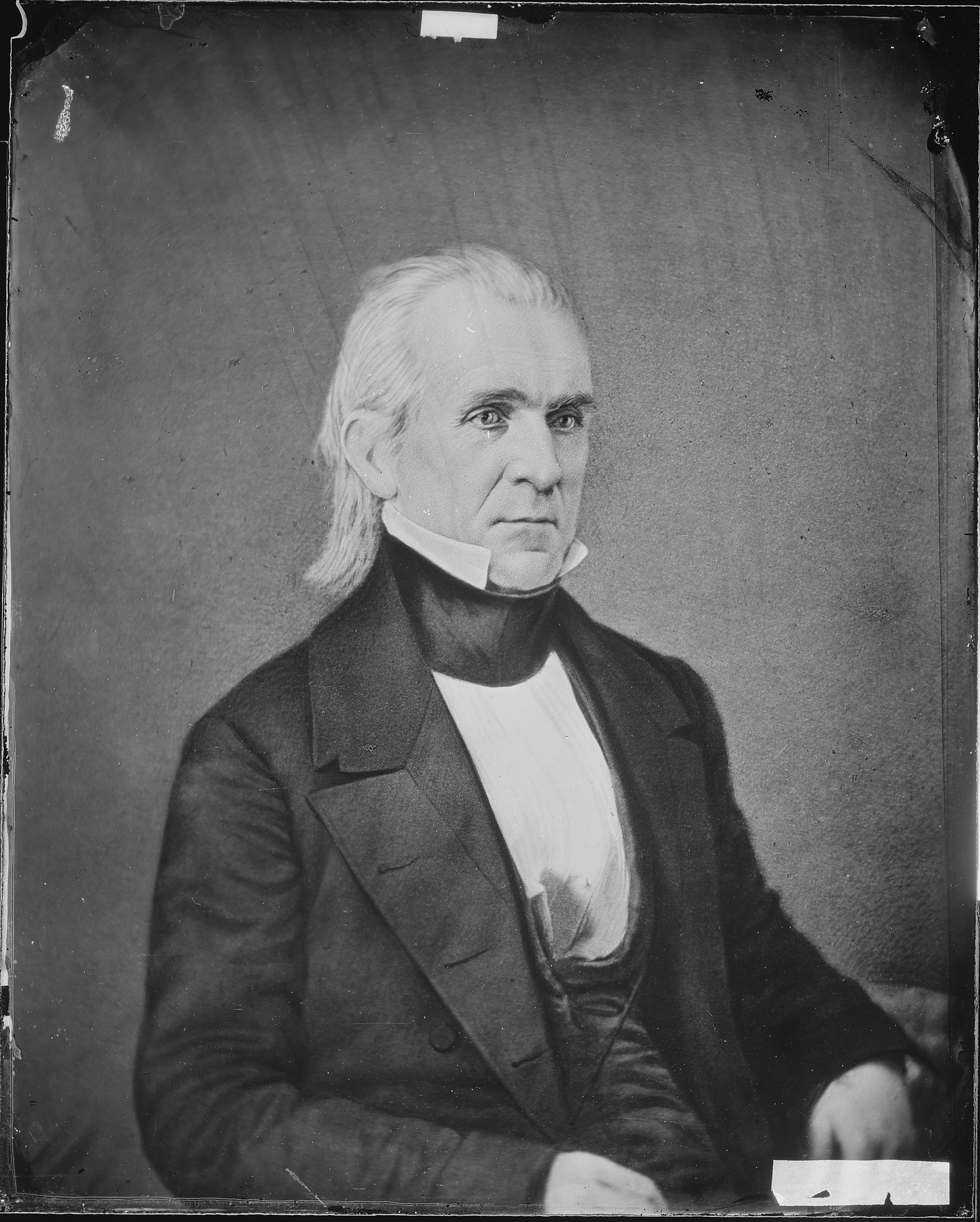
James K. Polk of Tennessee

President Tyler expected that his treaty would be debated secretly in Senate executive session. However, less than a week after debates opened, the treaty, its associated internal correspondence, and the Packenham letter were leaked to the public. The nature of the Tyler-Texas negotiations caused a national outcry, in that "the documents appeared to verify that the sole objective of Texas annexation was the preservation of slavery." A mobilization of anti-annexation forces in the North strengthened both major parties' hostility toward Tyler's agenda. The leading presidential hopefuls of both parties, Democrat Martin Van Buren and Whig Henry Clay, publicly denounced the treaty. Texas annexation and the reoccupation of Oregon territory emerged as the central issues in the 1844 general election.

In response, Tyler, already ejected from the Whig party, quickly began to organize a third party in hopes of inducing the Democrats to embrace a pro-expansionist platform. By running as a third-party candidate, Tyler threatened to siphon off pro-annexation Democratic voters; Democratic party disunity would mean the election of Henry Clay, a staunchly anti-Texas Whig. Pro-annexation delegates among southern Democrats, with assistance from a number of northern delegates, blocked anti-expansion candidate Martin Van Buren at the convention, which instead nominated the pro-expansion champion of Manifest Destiny, James K. Polk of Tennessee. Polk unified his party under the banner of Texas and Oregon acquisition.

In August 1844, in the midst of the campaign, Tyler withdrew from the race. The Democratic Party was by then unequivocally committed to Texas annexation, and Tyler, assured by Polk's envoys that as president he would effect Texas annexation, urged his supporters to vote Democratic. Polk narrowly defeated Whig Henry Clay in the November election. The victorious Democrats were poised to acquire Texas under President-elect Polk's doctrine of Manifest Destiny, rather than on the pro-slavery agenda of Tyler and Calhoun.

== Congressional debate over annexation ==
=== Tyler-Texas Treaty defeat in the Senate ===
As a treaty document with a foreign nation, the Tyler-Texas annexation treaty required the support of a two-thirds majority in the Senate for passage. But in fact, when the Senate voted on the measure on June 8, 1844, fully two-thirds voted against the treaty (16–35). The vote went largely along party lines: Whigs had opposed it almost unanimously (1–27), while Democrats split, but voted overwhelmingly in favor (15–8). The election campaign had hardened partisan positions on Texas among Democrats. Tyler had anticipated that the measure would fail, largely because of the divisive effects of Secretary Calhoun's Packenham letter. Undeterred, he formally asked the House of Representatives to consider other constitutional means to authorize passage of the treaty. Congress adjourned before debating the matter.

=== Reintroduction as a joint resolution ===
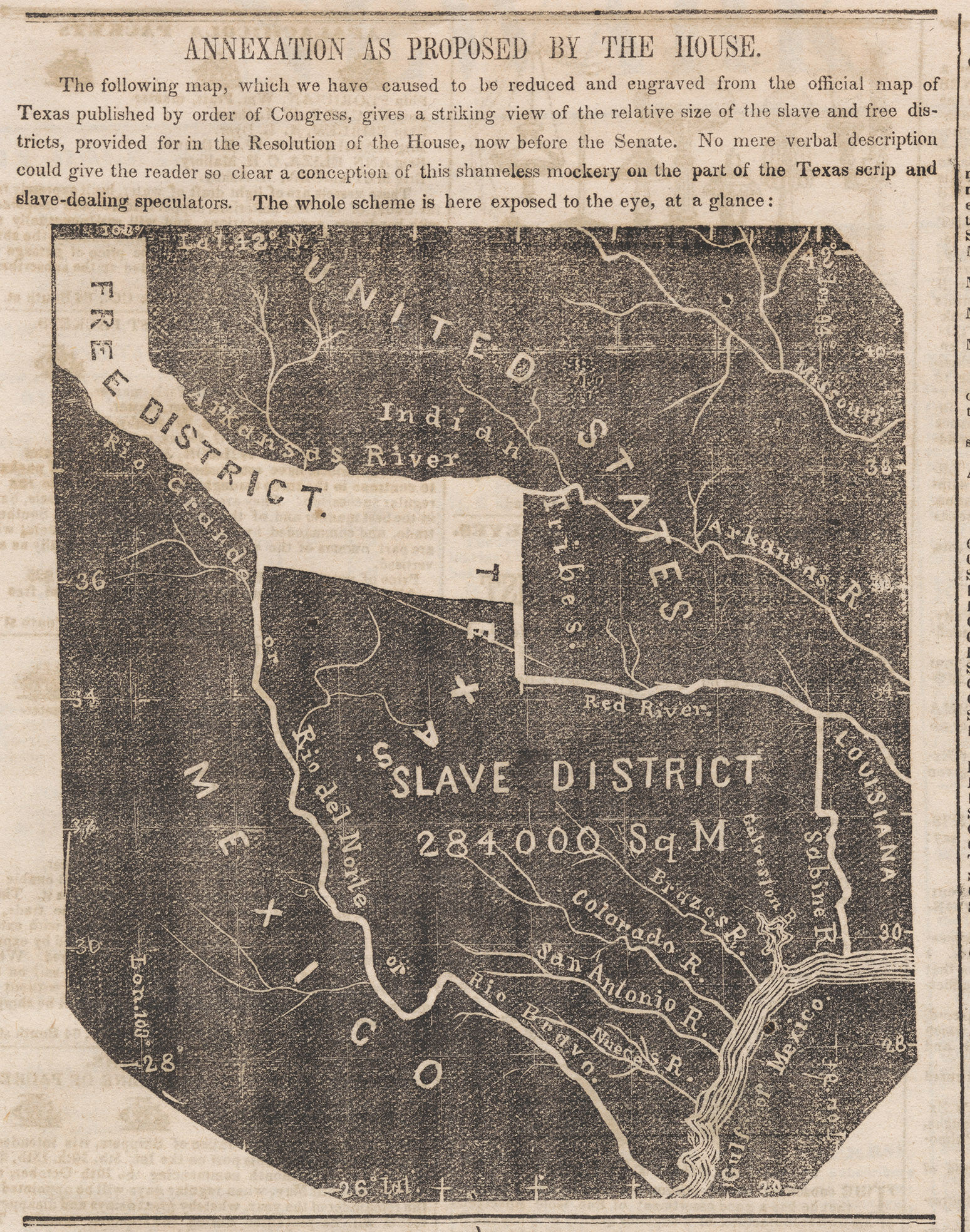
A map, published in the Newark Daily Advertiser as the U.S. Senate was considering a Joint Resolution for the Annexation of Texas that had been adopted by the House of Representatives.

The same Senate that had rejected the Tyler–Calhoun treaty by a margin of 2:1 in June 1844 reassembled in December 1844 in a short lame-duck session. (Though pro-annexation Democrats had made gains in the fall elections, those legislators – the 29th Congress – would not assume office until March 1845.) Lame-duck president Tyler, still trying to annex Texas in the final months of his administration, wished to avoid another overwhelming Senate rejection of his treaty. In his annual address to Congress on December 4, he declared the Polk victory a mandate for Texas annexation and proposed that Congress adopt a joint resolution procedure by which simple majorities in each house could secure ratification for the Tyler treaty. This method would avoid the constitutional requirement of a two-thirds majority in the Senate. Bringing the House of Representatives into the equation boded well for Texas annexation, as the pro-annexation Democratic Party possessed nearly a 2:1 majority in that chamber.

By resubmitting the discredited treaty through a House-sponsored bill, the Tyler administration reignited sectional hostilities over Texas admission. Both northern Democratic and southern Whig congressmen had been bewildered by local political agitation in their home states during the 1844 presidential campaigns. Now, northern Democrats found themselves vulnerable to charges of appeasement of their southern wing if they capitulated to Tyler's slavery expansion provisions. On the other hand, Manifest Destiny enthusiasm in the north placed politicians under pressure to admit Texas immediately to the Union.

Constitutional objections were raised in House debates as to whether both houses of Congress could constitutionally authorize admission of territories, rather than states. Moreover, if the Republic of Texas, a nation in its own right, were admitted as a state, its territorial boundaries, property relations (including slave property), debts and public lands would require a Senate-ratified treaty. Democrats were particularly uneasy about burdening the United States with $10 million in Texas debt, resenting the deluge of speculators, who had bought Texas bonds cheap and now lobbied Congress for the Texas House bill. House Democrats, at an impasse, relinquished the legislative initiative to the southern Whigs.

=== Brown–Foster House amendment ===
Anti-Texas Whig legislators had lost more than the White House in the general election of 1844. In the southern states of Tennessee and Georgia, Whig strongholds in the 1840 general election, voter support dropped precipitously over the pro-annexation excitement in the Deep South – and Clay lost every Deep South state to Polk. Northern Whigs' uncompromising hostility to slavery expansion increasingly characterized the party, and southern members, by association, had suffered from charges of being "soft on Texas, therefore soft on slavery" by Southern Democrats. Facing congressional and gubernatorial races in 1845 in their home states, a number of Southern Whigs sought to erase that impression with respect to the Tyler-Texas bill.

Southern Whigs in the Congress, including Representative Milton Brown and Senator Ephraim Foster, both of Tennessee, and Representative Alexander Stephens of Georgia collaborated to introduce a House amendment on January 13, 1845, that was designed to enhance slaveowner gains in Texas beyond those offered by the Democratic-sponsored Tyler-Calhoun treaty bill. The legislation proposed to recognize Texas as a slave state which would retain all its vast public lands, as well as its bonded debt accrued since 1836. Furthermore, the Brown amendment would delegate to the U.S. government responsibility for negotiating the disputed Texas-Mexico boundary. The issue was a critical one, as the size of Texas would be immensely increased if the international border were set at the Rio Grande River, with its headwaters in the Rocky Mountains, rather than the traditionally recognized boundary at the Nueces River, 100 miles to the north. While the Tyler-Calhoun treaty provided for the organization of a total of four states from the Texas lands – three likely to qualify as slave states – Brown's plan would permit Texas state lawmakers to configure a total of five states from its western region, with those south of the 36°30’ Missouri Compromise line pre-authorized to permit slavery upon statehood, if Texas designated them as such.

Politically, the Brown amendment was designed to portray Southern Whigs as "even more ardent champions of slavery and the South, than southern Democrats." The bill also served to distinguish them from their northern Whig colleagues who cast the controversy, as Calhoun did, in strictly pro- versus anti-slavery terms. While almost all Northern Whigs spurned Brown's amendment, the Democrats quickly co-opted the legislation, providing the votes necessary to attach the proviso to Tyler's joint resolution, by a 118–101 vote. Southern Democrats supported the bill almost unanimously (59–1), while Northern Democrats split strongly in favor (50–30). Eight of eighteen Southern Whigs cast their votes in favor. Northern Whigs unanimously rejected it. The House proceeded to approve the amended Texas treaty 120–98 on January 25, 1845. The vote in the House had been one in which party affiliation prevailed over sectional allegiance. The bill was forwarded the same day to the Senate for debate.

=== Benton Senate compromise ===
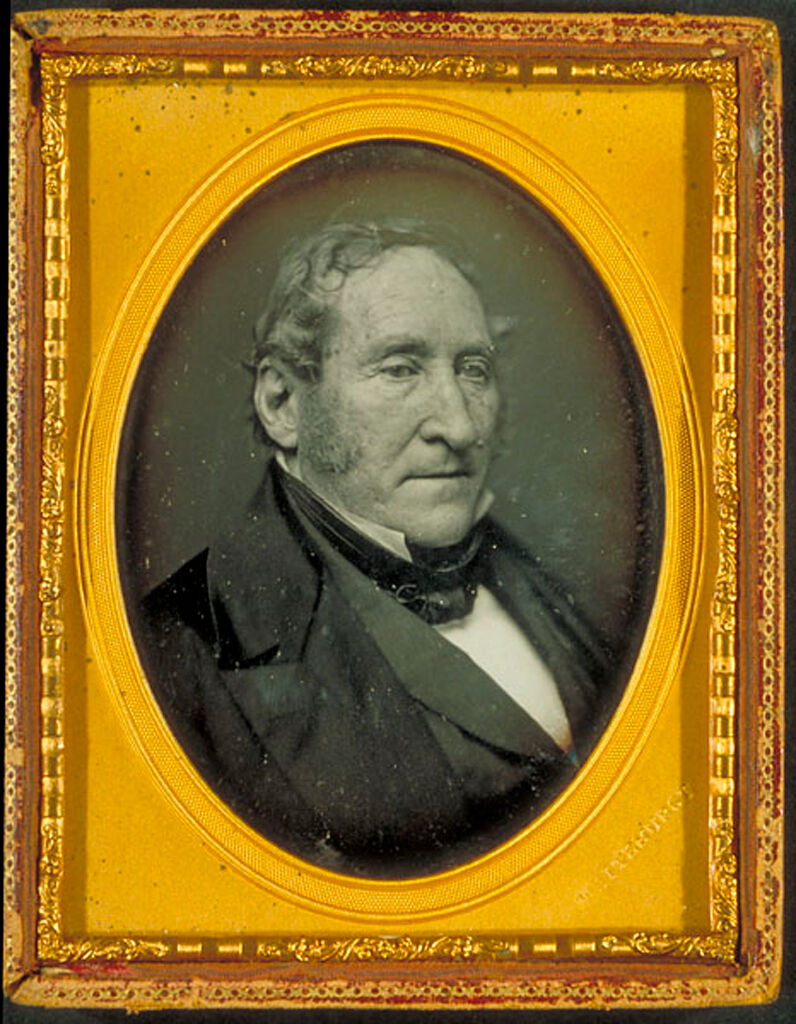
Senator Thomas Hart Benton of Missouri

By early February 1845, when the Senate began to debate the Brown-amended Tyler treaty, its passage seemed unlikely, as support was "perishing". The partisan alignments in the Senate were near parity, 28–24, slightly in favor of the Whigs. The Senate Democrats would require undivided support among their colleagues, and three or more Whigs who would be willing to cross party lines to pass the House-amended treaty. The fact that Senator Foster had drafted the House amendment under consideration improved prospects of Senate passage.

Anti-annexation senator Thomas Hart Benton of Missouri had been the only Southern Democrat to vote against the Tyler-Texas measure in June 1844. His original proposal for an annexed Texas had embodied a national compromise, whereby Texas would be divided in two, half slave-soil and half free-soil. As pro-annexation sentiment grew in his home state, Benton retreated from this compromise offer. By February 5, 1845, in the early debates on the Brown-amended House bill, he advanced an alternative resolution that, unlike the Brown scenario, made no reference whatsoever to the ultimate free-slave apportionment of an annexed Texas and simply called for five bipartisan commissioners to resolve border disputes with Texas and Mexico and set conditions for the Lone Star Republic's acquisition by the United States.

The Benton proposal was intended to calm northern anti-slavery Democrats (who wished to eliminate the Tyler-Calhoun treaty altogether, as it had been negotiated on behalf of the slavery expansionists), and allow the decision to devolve upon the soon-to-be-inaugurated Democratic president-elect James K. Polk. President-elect Polk had expressed his ardent wish that Texas annexation should be accomplished before he entered Washington in advance of his inauguration on March 4, 1845, the same day Congress would end its session. With his arrival in the capital, he discovered the Benton and Brown factions in the Senate "paralyzed" over the Texas annexation legislation. On the advice of his soon-to-be secretary of the Treasury Robert J. Walker, Polk urged Senate Democrats to unite under a dual resolution that would include both the Benton and Brown versions of annexation, leaving enactment of the legislation to Polk's discretion when he took office. In private and separate talks with supporters of both the Brown and Benton plans, Polk left each side with the "impression he would administer their [respective] policy. Polk meant what he said to Southerners and meant to appear friendly to the Van Burenite faction." Polk's handling of the matter had the effect of uniting Senate northern Democrats in favor of the dual alternative treaty bill.

On February 27, 1845, less than a week before Polk's inauguration, the Senate voted 27–25 to admit Texas, based on the Tyler protocols of simple majority passage. All twenty-four Democrats voted for the measure, joined by three southern Whigs. Benton and his allies were assured that Polk would act to establish the eastern portion of Texas as a slave state; the western section was to remain unorganized territory, not committed to slavery. On this understanding, the northern Democrats had conceded their votes for the dichotomous bill. The next day, in an almost strict party line vote, the Benton-Milton measure was passed in the Democrat-controlled House of Representatives. President Tyler signed the bill the following day, March 1, 1845 (Joint Resolution for annexing Texas to the United States, J.Res. 8, enacted March 1, 1845, 5 Stat. 797).

== Annexation and admittance ==
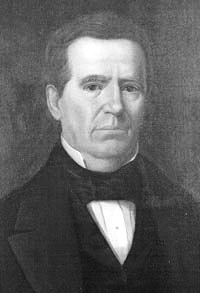
Anson Jones, last president of the Republic of Texas prior to Texas statehood

Senate and House legislators who had favored Benton's renegotiated version of the Texas annexation bill had been assured that President Tyler would sign the joint house measure, but leave its implementation to the incoming Polk administration. But, during his last full day in office, President Tyler, with the urging of his secretary of state Calhoun, decided to act decisively to improve the odds for the immediate annexation of Texas. On March 3, 1845, with his cabinet's assent, he dispatched an offer of annexation to the Republic of Texas by courier, exclusively under the terms of the Brown–Foster option of the joint house measure. Secretary Calhoun apprised President-elect Polk of the action, who demurred without comment. Tyler justified his preemptive move on the grounds that Polk was likely to come under pressure to abandon immediate annexation and reopen negotiations under the Benton alternative.

When President Polk took office on March 4, he was in a position to recall Tyler's dispatch to Texas and reverse his decision. On March 10, after conferring with his cabinet, Polk upheld Tyler's action and allowed the courier to proceed to Texas with the offer of immediate annexation. The only modification was to exhort Texans to accept the annexation terms unconditionally. Polk's decision was based on his concern that a protracted negotiation by US commissioners would expose annexation efforts to foreign intrigue and interference. While Polk kept his annexation endeavors confidential, Senators passed a resolution requesting formal disclosure of the administration's Texas policy. Polk stalled, and when the Senate special session had adjourned on March 20, 1845, no names for US commissioners to Texas had been submitted by him. Polk denied charges from Senator Benton that he had misled Benton on his intention to support the new negotiations option, declaring "if any such pledges were made, it was in a total misconception of what I said or meant."

On May 5, 1845, Texas president Jones called for a convention on July 4, 1845, to consider the annexation and a constitution. On June 23, the Texan Congress accepted the US Congress's joint resolution of March 1, 1845, annexing Texas to the United States, and consented to the convention. On July 4, the Texas convention debated the annexation offer and almost unanimously passed an ordinance assenting to it. The convention remained in session through August 28, and adopted the Constitution of Texas on August 27, 1845. The citizens of Texas approved the annexation ordinance and new constitution on October 13, 1845.

President Polk signed the legislation making the former Republic of Texas a state of the Union on December 29, 1845 (Joint Resolution for the admission of the state of Texas into the Union, J.Res. 1, enacted December 29, 1845, 9 Stat. 108). Texas relinquished its sovereignty to the United States at the inauguration of Governor James Henderson on February 19, 1846.

== Border disputes ==
Neither the joint resolution nor the ordinance of annexation contain language specifying the boundaries of Texas, and only refer in general terms to "the territory properly included within, and rightfully belonging to the Republic of Texas", and state that the new State of Texas is to be formed "subject to the adjustment by this [U.S.] government of all questions of boundary that may arise with other governments." According to George Lockhart Rives, "That treaty had been expressly so framed as to leave the boundaries of Texas undefined, and the joint resolution of the following winter was drawn in the same manner. It was hoped that this might open the way to a negotiation, in the course of which the whole subject of the boundaries of Mexico, from the Gulf to the Pacific, might be reconsidered, but these hopes came to nothing."

There was an ongoing border dispute between the Republic of Texas and Mexico prior to annexation. Texas claimed the Rio Grande as its border based on the Treaties of Velasco, while Mexico maintained that it was the Nueces River and did not recognize Texan independence. In November 1845, President James K. Polk sent John Slidell, a secret representative, to Mexico City with a monetary offer to the Mexican government for the disputed land and other Mexican territories. Mexico was not inclined nor able to negotiate because of instability in its government and popular nationalistic sentiment against such a sale. Slidell returned to the United States, and Polk ordered General Zachary Taylor to garrison the southern border of Texas, as defined by the former Republic, in 1846. Taylor moved into Texas, ignoring Mexican demands to withdraw, and marched as far south as the Rio Grande, where he began to build a fort near the river's mouth on the Gulf of Mexico. The Mexican government regarded this action as a violation of its sovereignty, and immediately prepared for war. Following a United States victory and the signing of the Treaty of Guadalupe Hidalgo, Mexico ceded its claims to Texas and the Rio Grande border was accepted by both nations. These cessions additionally included the Mexican provinces of Alta California and Nuevo México.

== Joint resolution precedent and legacy: Hawaii ==
The formal controversy over the legality of the annexation of Texas stems from the fact that Congress approved the annexation of Texas as a state, rather than a territory, with simple majorities in each house, instead of annexing the land by Senate treaty, as was done with Native American lands. Tyler's extralegal joint resolution maneuver in 1844 exceeded strict constructionist precepts, but was passed by Congress in 1845 as part of a compromise bill. The success of the joint house Texas annexation set a precedent that would be applied to the annexation of the Republic of Hawaii in 1897.

Republican president Benjamin Harrison (1889–1893) attempted, in 1893, to annex the Republic of Hawaii through a Senate treaty. When this failed, he was asked to consider the Tyler joint house precedent; he declined. Democratic President Grover Cleveland (1893–1897) did not pursue the annexation of the Republic of Hawaii. When President William McKinley took office in 1897, he quickly revived expectations among territorial expansionists when he resubmitted legislation to acquire the Republic of Hawaii. When the two-thirds Senate support was not forthcoming, committees in the House and Senate explicitly invoked the Tyler precedent for the joint house resolution, which was successfully applied to approve the annexation of Hawaii as an organized incorporated territory in July 1898.

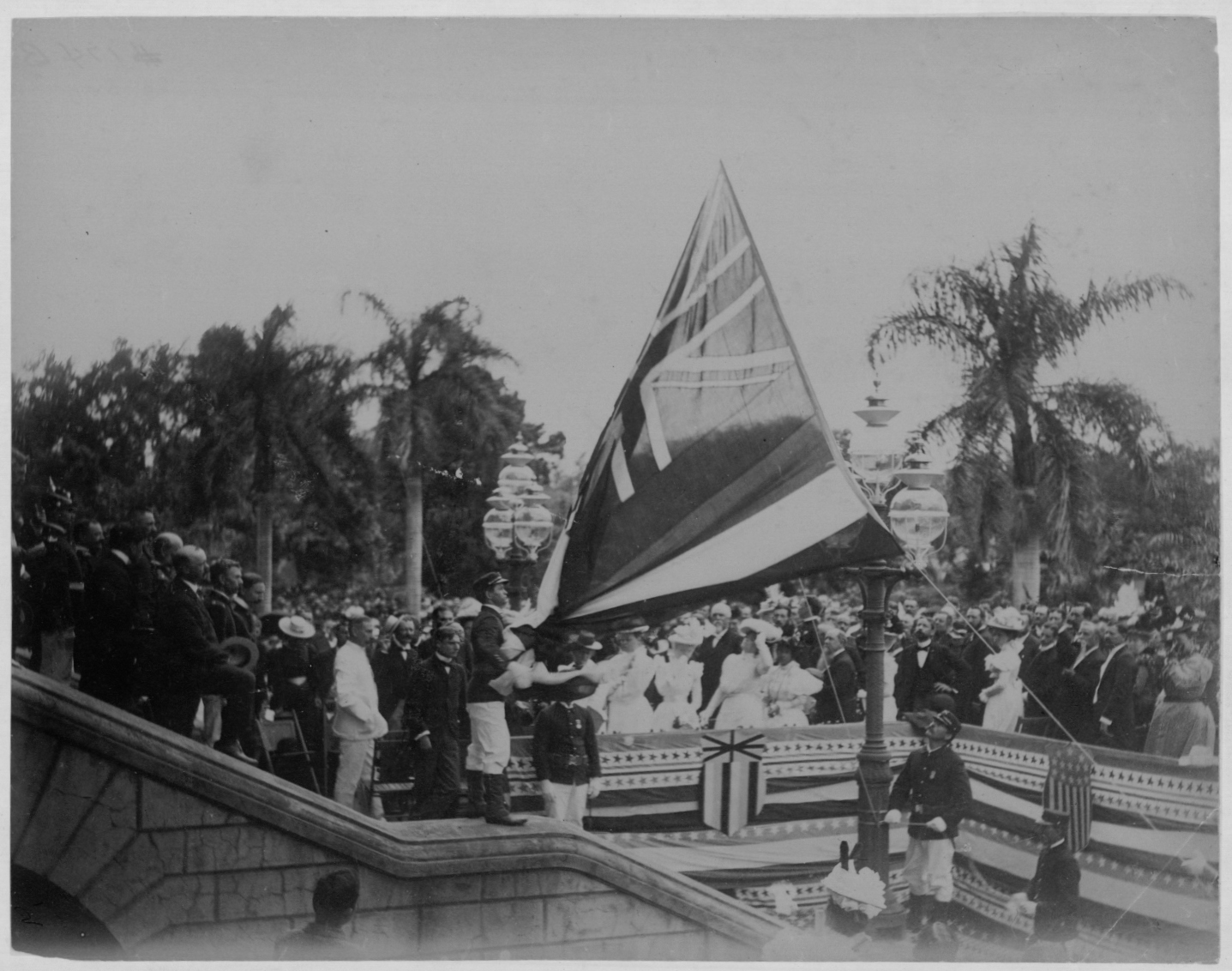

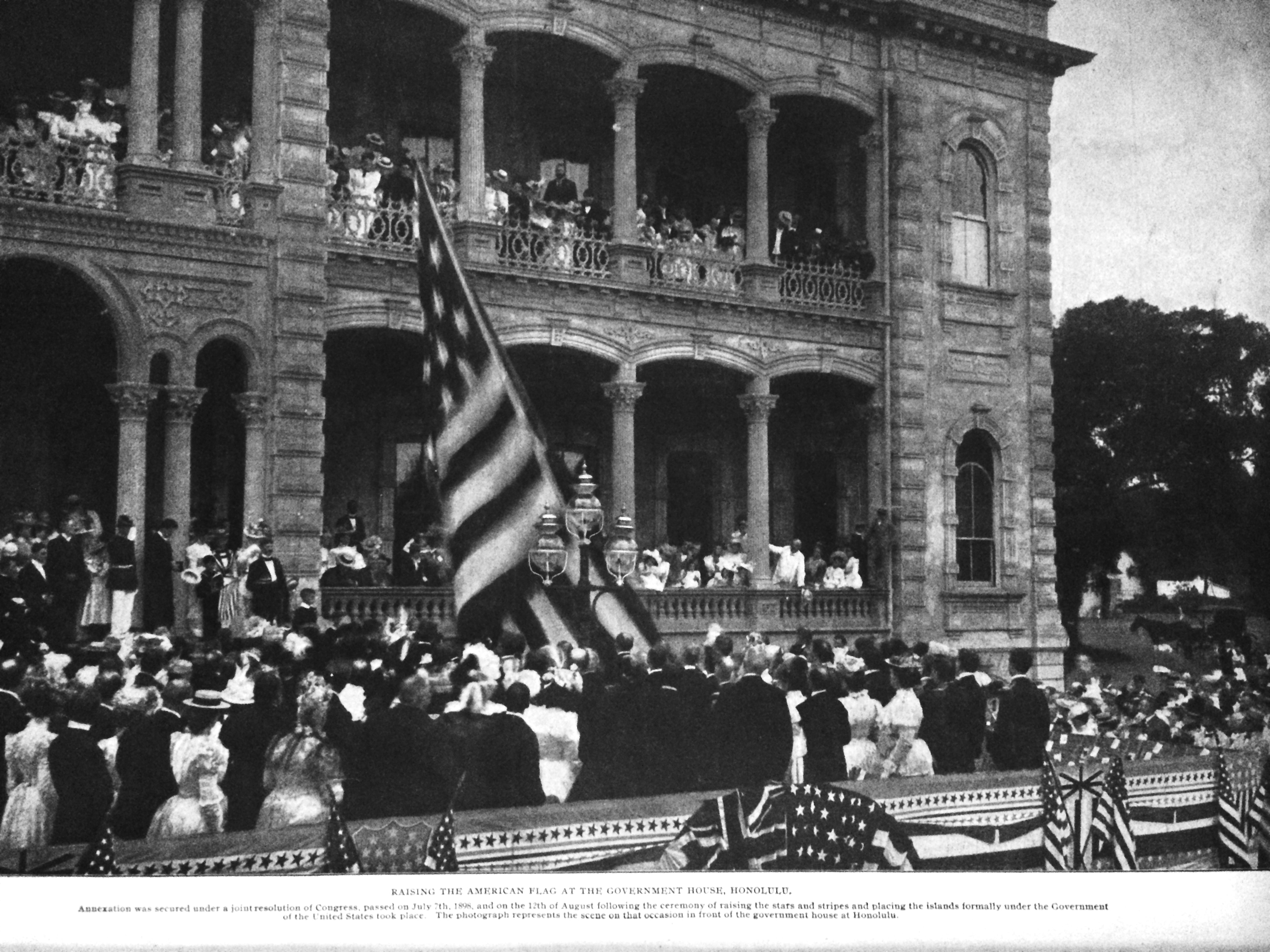
On August 12, 1898, the flag of the Republic of Hawaii over ʻIolani Palace was lowered and the United States flag raised to signify annexation.

== See also ==
- Bibliography of James K. Polk
- Bibliography of the Mexican American War
- Bibliography of the Texas Revolution, Republic, and Annexation
