= List of census-designated places in Minnesota =

Map of the United States with Minnesota highlighted

This article lists census-designated places (CDPs) in the U.S. state of Minnesota. As of the 2020 census, there were a total of 60 census-designated places in Minnesota. Arnold ceased to exist with the incorporation of the city of Rice Lake and Oakport was annexed by Moorhead, both in 2015.

== Census-designated places in Minnesota ==
2020 Rank	CDP	2020 Census	2010 Census	Change	County
1	Esko	2,082	1,869	+11.40%	Carlton
2	Red Lake	1,786	1,731	+3.18%	Beltrami
3	St. John's University	1,585	1,678	−5.54%	Stearns
4	Redby	1,302	1,334	−2.40%	Beltrami
5	Little Rock	1,021	1,208	−15.48%	Beltrami
6	Martin Lake	907	933	−2.79%	Anoka
7	Vineland	869	1,001	−13.19%	Mille Lacs
8	Warsaw	644	627	+2.71%	Rice
9	Ponemah	599	724	−17.27%	Beltrami
10	The Lakes	590	667	−11.54%	Murray
11	White Earth	522	580	−10.00%	Becker
12	Naytahwaush	504	578	−12.80%	Mahnomen
13	Big Lake	464	443	+4.74%	Carlton
14	Fairhaven	392	358	+9.50%	Stearns
15	Soudan	385	446	−13.68%	St. Louis
16	Crown College	367	2	+18,250.00%	Carver
17	Ball Club	354	342	+3.51%	Itasca
18	Garden City	339	255	+32.94%	Blue Earth
19	Mahtowa	332	370	−10.27%	Carlton
20	Riverland	293	276	+6.16%	Mahnomen
21	Osage	282	323	−12.69%	Becker
22	Pine Point	281	338	−16.86%	Becker
23	Rice Lake	274	235	+16.60%	Clearwater
24	Dresbach	272	120	+126.67%	Winona
25	Marion	271	266	+1.88%	Olmsted
26	Silver Creek	254	256	−0.78%	Wright
27	Frontenac	249	282	−11.70%	Goodhue
28	Lake George	233	230	+1.30%	Hubbard
29	Mahnomen	231	239	−3.35%	St. Louis
30	Nett Lake	230	284	−19.01%	St. Louis; Koochiching
31	Lutsen	220	190	+15.79%	Cook
32	Finland	215	195	+10.26%	Lake
33	Knife River	212	239	−11.30%	Lake
34	Leota	202	209	−3.35%	Nobles
35	Inger	200	212	−5.66%	Itasca
36	Searles	192	171	+12.28%	Brown
37	Twin Lakes	192	149	+28.86%	Mahnomen
38	Homer	189	181	+4.42%	Winona
39	Pickwick	157	75	+109.33%	Winona
40	Merrifield	140	140	0.00%	Crow Wing
41	Lansing	132	181	−27.07%	Mower
42	High Forest	126	69	+82.61%	Olmsted
43	Elbow Lake	118	95	+24.21%	Becker; Clearwater
44	Beaulieu	103	48	+114.58%	Mahnomen
45	Stanchfield	103	118	−12.71%	Isanti
46	Fish Lake	75	51	+47.06%	Jackson
47	Ronneby	71	67	+5.97%	Benton
48	Whipholt	70	99	−29.29%	Cass
49	Hubbard	56	58	−3.45%	Hubbard
50	West Roy Lake	56	74	−24.32%	Mahnomen
51	Angle Inlet	54	60	−10.00%	Lake of the Woods
52	Goodland	51	6	+750.00%	Itasca
53	Ebro	50	64	−21.87%	Clearwater
54	Essig	49	36	+36.11%	Brown
55	Baker	45	55	−18.18%	Clay
56	South End	34	25	+36.00%	Clearwater
57	Pine Bend	31	28	+10.71%	Mahnomen
58	Roy Lake	30	12	+150.00%	Clearwater; Mahnomen
59	Midway	20	26	−23.08%	Mahnomen
60	The Ranch	14	9	+55.56%	Mahnomen

== See also ==
- List of townships in Minnesota
- List of cities in Minnesota
- List of counties in Minnesota
