= White Earth Indian Reservation =

Anishinaabe / Ojibwe reservation in Minnesota

Coordinates: 47°13′39″N 95°43′13″W

The location of the White Earth Indian Reservation in northwestern Minnesota

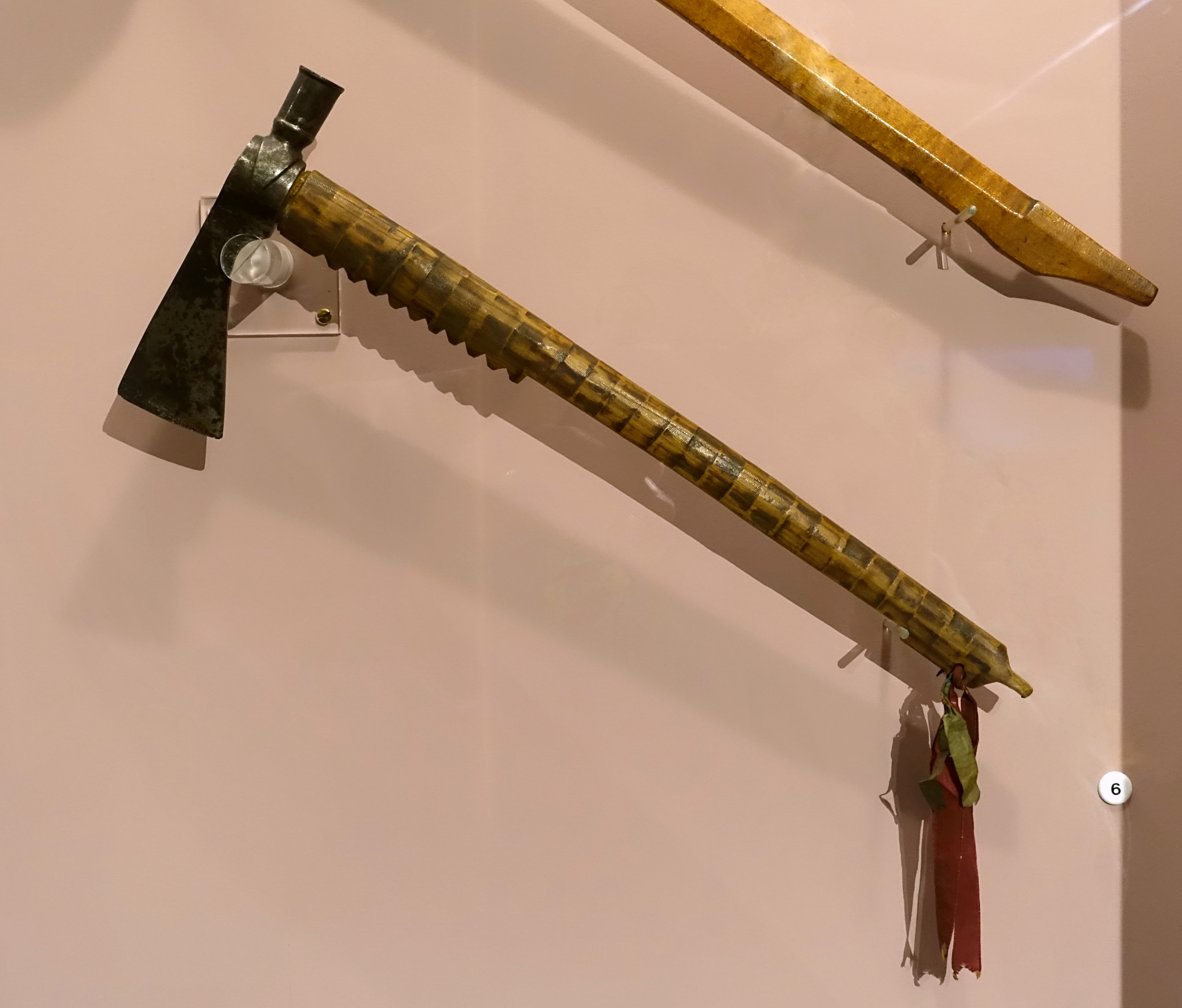
Tomahawk pipe, Southwestern Chippewa, collected on the White Earth Reservation, Minnesota in 1889 – Native American collection – Peabody Museum, Harvard University – DSC05805

The White Earth Indian Reservation (Ojibwe: Gaa-waabaabiganikaag, lit. 'Where there is an abundance of white clay') is home to the White Earth Band, in northwestern Minnesota. It was the largest Indian reservation in the state by land area. The phrase 'White Earth' in the Reservation's name comes from the layer of white clay that lays underneath the western part of the land. The reservation includes all of Mahnomen County, plus parts of Becker and Clearwater counties in the northwest part of the state along the Wild Rice and White Earth rivers. The reservation's total area is 1,296 square miles (3,360 km^{2}). The population was 9,726 as of the 2020 census, including off-reservation trust land. The White Earth Indian Reservation is one of six bands that make up the Minnesota Chippewa Tribe, their governing body for major administrative needs. It is about 225 miles (362 km) from Minneapolis–Saint Paul and roughly 65 miles (105 km) from Fargo–Moorhead.

The White Earth Reservation was created on March 19, 1867, by a treaty (16 Stat. 719) signed in Washington, D.C. Ten Ojibwe Indian chiefs met with President Andrew Johnson at the White House to negotiate the treaty. The chiefs Wabanquot (White Cloud), a Gull Lake Mississippi Chippewa, and Fine Day, of the Removable Mille Lacs Indians, were among the first to move with their followers to White Earth in 1868.

The reservation originally covered 1,300 square miles (3,400 km^{2}). Much of the community's land was improperly sold or seized by outside interests, including the U.S. federal government, in the late 19th century and early 20th century. According to the Dawes Act of 1887, the communal land was to be allotted to individual households recorded in tribal rolls, for cultivation in subsistence farming. Under the act, the remainder was declared surplus and available for sale to non-Native Americans. The Nelson Act of 1889 was a corollary law that enabled the land to be divided and sold to non-Native Americans. In the latter half of the 20th century, the federal government arranged for the transfer of state and county land to the reservation in compensation for other property that had been lost.

In 1989, Winona LaDuke formed the White Earth Land Recovery Project, which has slowly been acquiring land privately held to add back to the value of the non-profit 501(c)(3) to be used for collateral. At that time, less than ten percent of the land within reservation boundaries was owned by tribal members.

The White Earth Band government operates the Shooting Star Casino, Hotel and Event center in Mahnomen, Minnesota. The entertainment and gambling complex employs over 1,000 tribal and non-tribal staff, with a new location in Bagley, Minnesota. White Earth, like the Leech Lake and Red Lake Indian Reservations, is known for its tradition of singing hymns in the Ojibwe language.

== History ==
Prior to the decision to create a reservation in Mahnomen County, there were Ojibwe living there.

=== Civil War ===
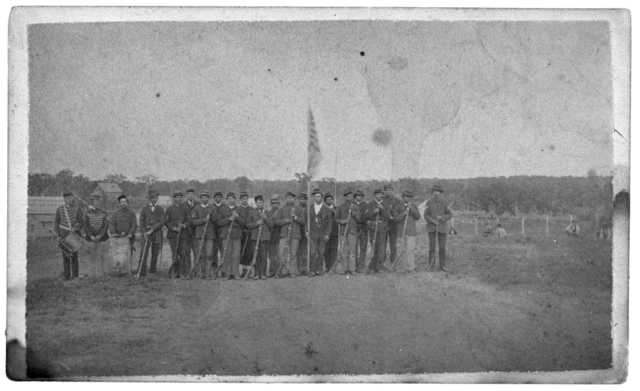
The Chippewa of G Company 9th Minnesota prior to going south in 1863.

G Company of the 9th Minnesota Infantry Regiment had a large component of bi-racial White Earth Chippewa. Their military service was the result of underhand tactics, Chippewa historians Julia Spears and William Warren report: A group of white citizens of Crow Wing enrolled bi-racial Chippewa as substitutes to fight in their place, as allowed by the Enrollment Act, thus avoiding being drafted into the Civil War themselves. These white Crow Wing residents deliberately arranged for the Chippewa substitutes to sign the papers while under the influence of alcohol. Chief Hole in the Day II was furious when he learned of the subterfuge. One of those men was killed and buried with military honors before Company G even left St. Cloud where they had been mustered in.

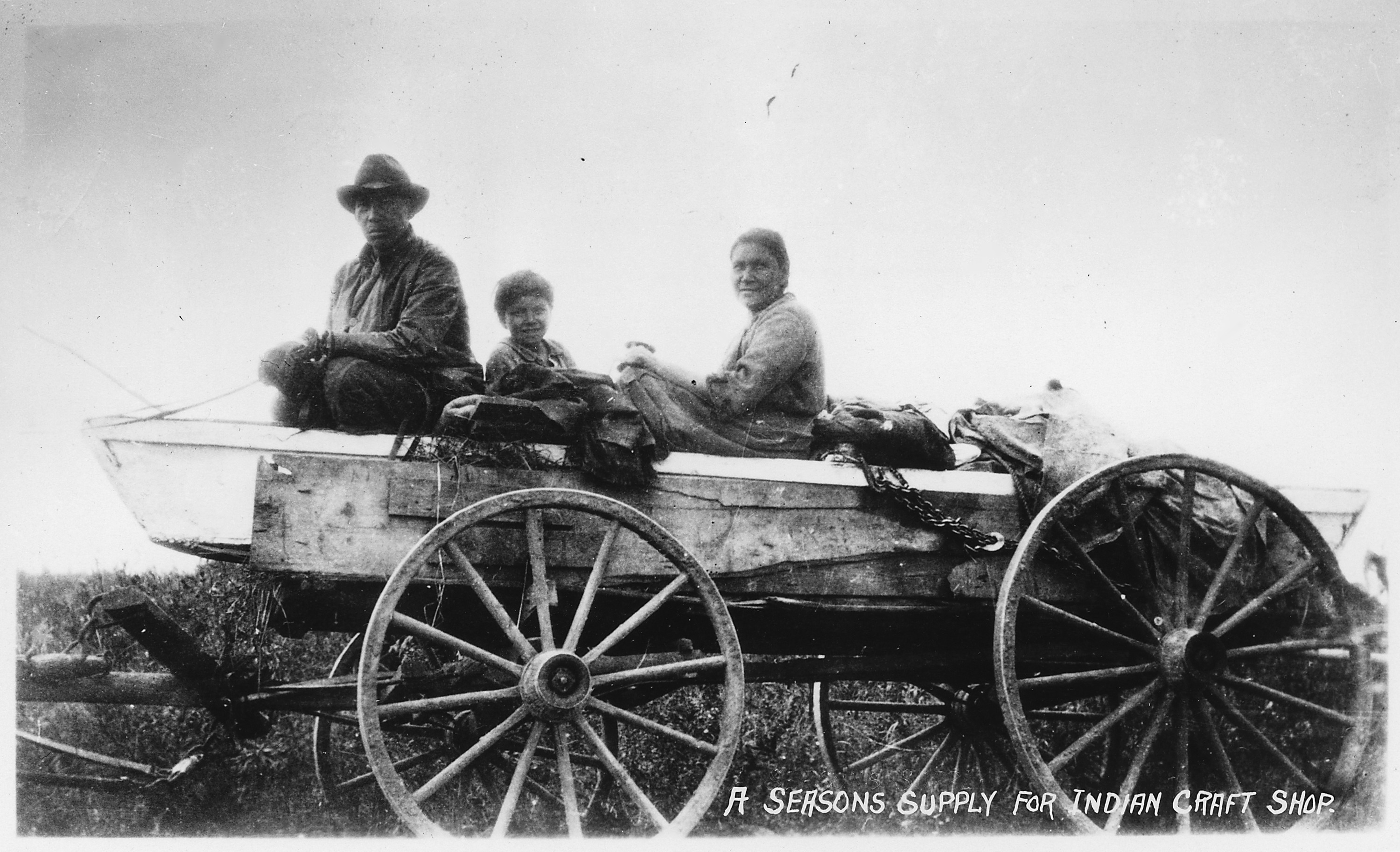
Family and goods in a wagon on the White Earth Reservation, 1934

G Company was posted forward to Fort Abercrombie in Dakota Territory. They arrived on September 3 to find the Fort under Sioux attack. They went into action and helped break the assault. The Company joined the garrison and survived the Sioux siege that followed. The company remained at Fort Abercrombie until the 9th Minnesota was sent south where it participated in the Battle of Brice's Crossroads. There, G Company gained recognition as skilled Skirmishers. They fought a difficult but successful rear guard action along with two African American Regiments, the 55th and 59th United States Colored Infantry Regiments. They were credited with providing needed cover fire that kept 59th troops from being over-run while dismantling a bridge's decking to thwart Confederate Cavalry from following. Afterwards they participated in the Battle of Tupelo, the Burning of Oxford, Mississippi, the Battle of Nashville, the Mobile Campaign (1865), the Battle of Fort Blakeley and the Battle of Spanish Fort. They returned to St. Paul, Minnesota in August 1865, having taken few casualties.

=== Establishment ===
Originally, the United States wanted to relocate all Anishinaabe people from Michigan, Wisconsin, and Minnesota to the White Earth Reservation. The plan was to open the vacated reservation lands to settlement by European Americans. The U.S. government even proposed relocating the Dakota people to the White Earth Reservation, although the two peoples had been traditional enemies and the Anishinaabe had invaded their land in the late 18th century. The U.S. continued to promote this policy until 1898.

On July 8, 1889, the United States broke treaty agreements informing the Minnesota Chippewa that the Red Lake Reservation and White Earth Reservation would remain, but that the others would be eliminated. The Bureau of Indian Affairs also stated the Chippewa from the other Reservations would be relocated to White Earth. Instead of dealing with the Chippewa tribes on a nation-to-nation level, the Bureau put decisions about communal land use to a vote by tribal members. It said that the decision to accept land allotments under the Dawes Act would be settled by a vote of individual adult Chippewa males, rather than allowing the tribe to make a decision according to their own traditions of council. Included in the decision to allow allotment, was that lands remaining after all households received allotments, would be declared "surplus" and could be sold to "white" settlers. Chippewa leaders were outraged. They knew they could count on the average Anishinaabe adult male to abide by the council's decision. However, included in the voting were many Dakota men, who were not part of their tribe.

The Chippewa mistrusted the oversight and administration of the vote. To start; "whites" with a business interest in allotments, counted the vote rather than the Chippewa. Red Lake leaders warned the Government about reprisals if their Reservation was violated. The White Earth and Mille Lacs reservations overwhelmingly voted to accept land allotments and allow surplus land to be sold. Supposedly, the Leech Lake Reservation voted overwhelmingly to accept land allotments. The events of Battle of Sugar Point in October 1898 seemed to indicate otherwise.

In 1889, the White Earth Reservation covered 1,093 square miles (2,830 km^{2}). After the votes were counted, the whites claimed that the vote had overwhelmingly accepted land allotments and the "surplus" lands would be sold to settlers. Afterwards, only a small portion of the White Earth Reservation remained. It was the northeast portion of the existing Reservation, a fraction of the original size. Most of the other Minnesota Chippewa reservations were closed and emptied. A rebellion on the Leech Lake Reservation in 1898 saved Minnesota's Chippewa reservations, including the White Earth Reservation, probably the Red Lake Reservation, and the Chippewa reservations of Wisconsin.

Before the Nelson Act of 1889 took effect, groups of Anishinaabe and Dakota peoples began to relocate to the White Earth Reservation from other Minnesota Chippewa and Dakota reservations. The 1920 census details provide data on the heritage of the Anishinabe living on the White Earth Reservation, as they indicated their original bands. There were 4,856 from the Mississippi Band of Chippewa (over 1,000 were Mille Lacs band, and many were Dakota). The Pillagers numbered 1,218; the Pembina Band were 472; and 113 were Fond du Lac and other Lake Superior Chippewa bands.

=== Leadership ===
In 1885, Joseph, the youngest son of Chief Hole in the Day II, was sponsored by former governor Alexander Ramsey to be a cadet at West Point. They traveled to Washington D.C. to meet President Cleveland making national news. All agreed that he was a good candidate and likely to be accepted. They returned to Minnesota and a year later Hole-in-the-Day gave the USPS notice he was leaving their employ to be a Chief on the White Earth Reservation. The USPS was surprised as no one knew his heritage. He enlisted in Co. I 14th Minnesota Infantry Regiment for the Spanish American War.

Joseph and his older brother Ignatius Hole-in-the-Day were well-educated and chiefs on White Earth. Ignatius attended the Indian school at Faribault and later graduated from St. John's College (later St. John's University). Joseph went to the Haskill Institute and the University of Minnesota. Ignatius traveled the state giving paid lectures to the public on Ojibwa history. Joseph was employed for a period by the Bureau of Ethnology recording Indigenous lore.

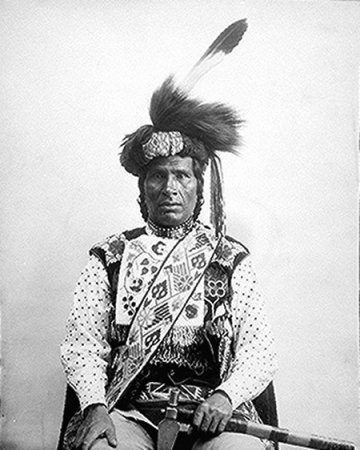
"One Called From A Distance" (Midwewinind) of the White Earth Band, wearing a beaded sash and vest, 1894

== Communities ==
White Earth Reservation has many settlements located within its borders. Some are predominantly non-native, or include have large portion that is biracial. Today, how individuals live in terms of their culture often determines whether they are considered Ojibwe. Some community members prefer to identify as Anishinaabe or Ojibwe while others prefer "Chippewa". Some claim the word "Chippewa" is the anglicized form of Ojibwa that was used by European settlers in the U.S. while Ojibwa was used the French provenances of Canada. According to tradition, the Ojibwe had a patrilineal society in which inheritance and descent was passed down paternal lines. Children were considered born into their father's clan and took their social status from his people.

Settlements that are predominantly native include Elbow Lake; Naytahwaush, the largest Indian community on the Reservation; Pine Point; Rice Lake; Twin Lakes; and White Earth, which is the second-largest Indian settlement on the Reservation. The following communities are considered to have predominantly Indian populations when their mixed-blood residents are included, whether or not those are enrolled tribal members: Waubun, Ogema, and Callaway. The largest community is Mahnomen, which is predominantly non-native in population.

Tiny settlements that are likely predominantly Native American include Mahkonce; Maple Grove Township; Pine Bend; Roy Lake, and Strawberry Lake region. In July 2007, according to the Minnesota Chippewa Tribe, the total number of enrolled members of the White Earth Reservation is 19,291. Most members live off-reservation, particularly those of Dakota ancestry. Many live in the Twin cities, which offer more economic prospects.

- Beaulieu
- Bejou
- Callaway
- Elbow Lake
- Mahnomen
- Midway
- Naytahwaush
- Ogema
- Pine Bend
- Pine Point
- Rice Lake
- Roy Lake
- South End
- The Ranch
- Twin Lakes
- Waubun
- West Roy Lake
- White Earth

== Demographics ==
As of the census of 2020, the combined population of the White Earth Reservation and associated off-reservation trust land was 9,726. The population density was 8.9 inhabitants per square mile (3.4/km^{2}). There were 4,989 housing units at an average density of 4.5 per square mile (1.7/km^{2}).

The White Earth Reservation has a large non-Native population, as the Nelson Act of 1889 and subsequent legislation permitted sales of tribal lands to white settlers. In 2020, the racial makeup of the reservation and off-reservation trust land was: 44.7 percent Native American; 43.2 percent White; 0.1% Asian; 0.1% Black or African American; 0.5% from other races; and 11.5 percent from two or more races. Ethnically, the population was 2.1 percent Hispanic or Latino of any race.

The chairwoman of the White Earth Reservation says that the Indian populations of reservations are higher than counted during censuses. She said that many Reservation families had more than one family sharing the same residence, and these were not always counted. In some cases up to three families shared the same residence. During census counts, the extra families will likely not participate for fear of being evicted from their homes. It may be that the population of the White Earth Band is larger than that of whites on the reservation.

== Economy ==
White Earth Reservation has an economy which is similar to other Native American reservations. In 2011, the government of the White Earth Reservation employed nearly 1,750 employees. The tribal payroll was near $21 million. The government of the White Earth Reservation employs non-Indians as well as Chippewa from off the reservation to fill its staffing needs. The Band issues its own reservation license plates to vehicles.

The White Earth Reservation owns and operates an Event Center, a hotel, the Shooting Star Casino, the White Earth Housing Authority, the Reservations College, and other business enterprises.

The poverty rate on the White Earth Reservation may be nearly fifty percent. The unemployment rate on the White Earth Reservation is almost twenty-five percent. (Note: The White Earth Reservation is classified as the poorest reservation in the State of Minnesota.)

== Topography ==
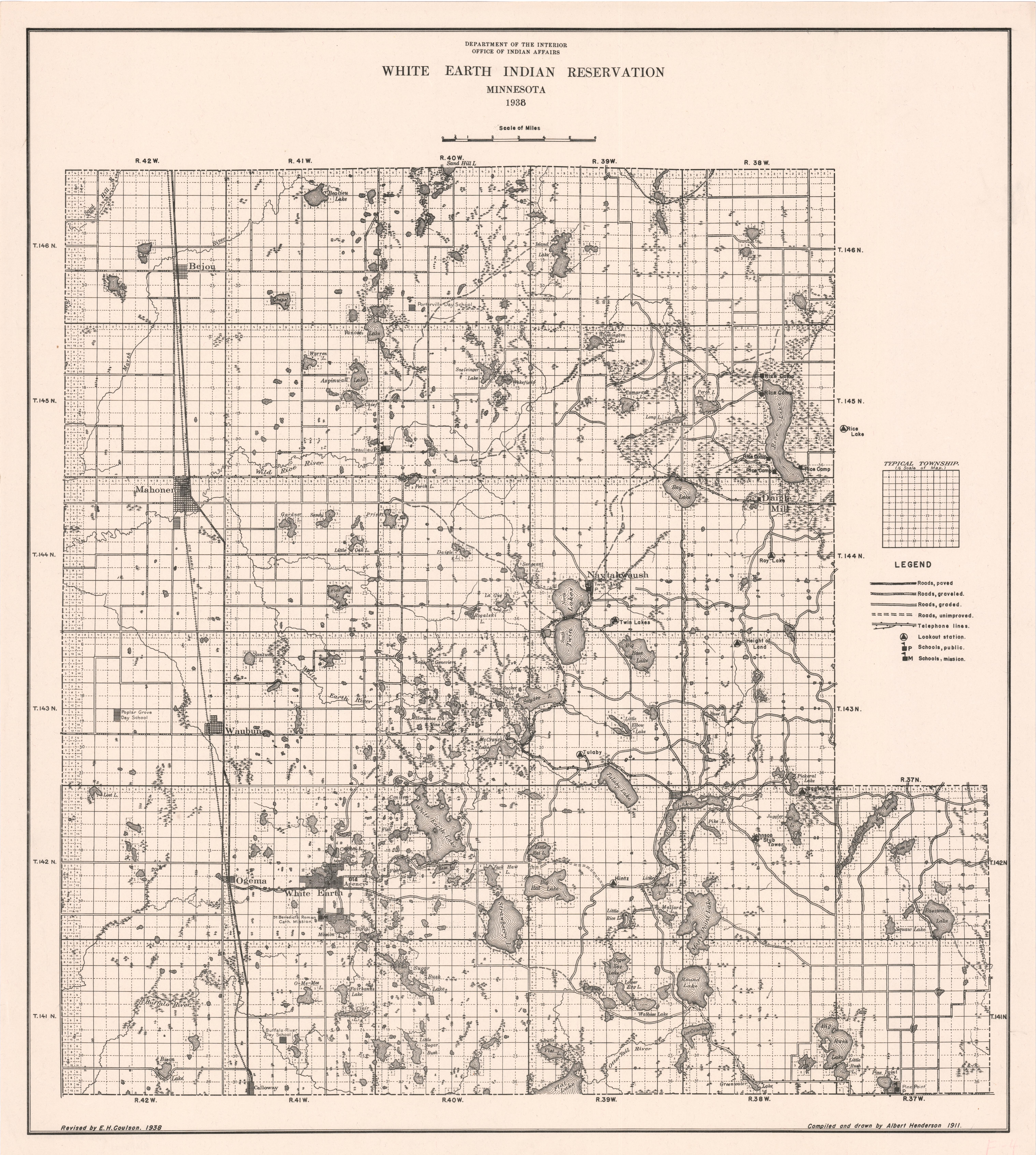
Map of the reservation, 1938

White Earth Reservation is situated in an area where the prairie meets the boreal forest. About half the Reservation is covered by a forest and lakes, with second-growth trees. In the late 19th century, lumber companies clear-cut much of the old growth forest that had covered the Reservation.

The western part of the Reservation is prime prairie land. Many farms are located in this section. Another area of numerous farms is the extreme northeastern section of the Reservation.

The most dense forest is situated between Callaway and Pine Point, on up to just west and north of Mahkonce. North of there, the forest becomes less dense, especially around the Pine Bend and Rice Lake regions. The region between Mahkonce and Pine Bend has a few farms.

Many lakes dot the Reservation's land. Large lakes include Bass Lake; Big Rat Lake; Lower Rice Lake; Many Point Lake; North Twin Lake-South Twin Lake; Roy Lake; Round Lake; Snider Lake; Strawberry Lake; Tulaby Lake; and White Earth Lake. The White Earth Land Recovery Project encourages ownership of reservation land by members of the White Earth Band, as well as projects for reforestation and revival of the wild rice industry on the reservation's lakes. It sells a reservation brand of wild rice and other products.

The 160,000-acre (65,000 ha) White Earth State Forest is a portion of the Reservation. The Reservation's land is still recovering from the effects of the destruction which the lumber companies caused over a century ago. The Reservation is especially scenic in the non-winter months.

== Climate ==
Weather on the White Earth Reservation is challenging. Winter lasts at least three months, with daily lows for those months averaging 1 °F (−17 °C), −6 °F and 0 °F (−18 °C). Other average high and low temperatures for the summer and winter months are shown below.

Average temperatures at Mahnomen, winter and summer months, in degrees Fahrenheit (Celsius)
| Month | December | January | February | June | July | August |
|---|---|---|---|---|---|---|
| Average low | 1 °F (−17 °C) | −6 °F (−21 °C) | 0 °F (−18 °C) | 52 °F (11 °C) | 56 °F (13 °C) | 54 °F (12 °C) |
| Average high | 20 °F (−7 °C) | 14 °F (−10 °C) | 21 °F (−6 °C) | 76 °F (24 °C) | 81 °F (27 °C) | 80 °F (27 °C) |

Average yearly precipitation at Mahnomen is over 22 inches (560 mm).

== See also ==
- Enmegahbowh
- Wainchemahdub
