= William Little Wolf =

Native American World War I Navy gunner

- Born: April 22, 1899; Naytahwaush, White Earth Reservation, Minnesota
- Died: September of 1953 (53); Minneapolis, Minnesota
- Burial place: Fort Snelling National Cemetery
- Military career
- Branch: Navy
- Service years: 1917-1919
- Rank: Petty officer third class
- Nickname: William Leon Wolfe

William Little Wolf (April 22, 1899 - September of 1953) was an Ojibwe World War I veteran and truck driver in Minnesota..

== Early life ==
William Little Wolf was born on the White Earth Indian Reservation in 1899 to Bishop and Maggie Little Wolf. His parents were likely forced to move from Mille Lacs to the White Earth Reservation under pressure from logging companies. Little Wolf claimed Ininew (Cree) and Ojibwe ancestry, and he grew up speaking Ojibwe.

In 1909, Little Wolfwas sent to the Wild Rice Boarding School, an American Indian boarding school in Saint Paul, but escaped the school in 1912 and was enrolled at a boarding school ran by nuns with the Order of Saint Benedict. In 1913, he was sent to the Carlisle Indian Industrial School in Carlisle, Pennsylvania. Little Wolf soon ran away from Carlisle, but re-enrolled in 1916 and sought admission for a brother and sister.

== World War I ==
In June of 1917, Little Wolf fled once again and enlisted in the U.S. Navy under the pseudonym, William Leon Wolfe. He was sent to basic training at the Norfolk Training Station and worked as baker aboard the USS Texas. After leaving, he wrote Carlisle's superintendent with an explanation, who changed Little Wolf's status from "deserter" to "withdrawn" on his student records.

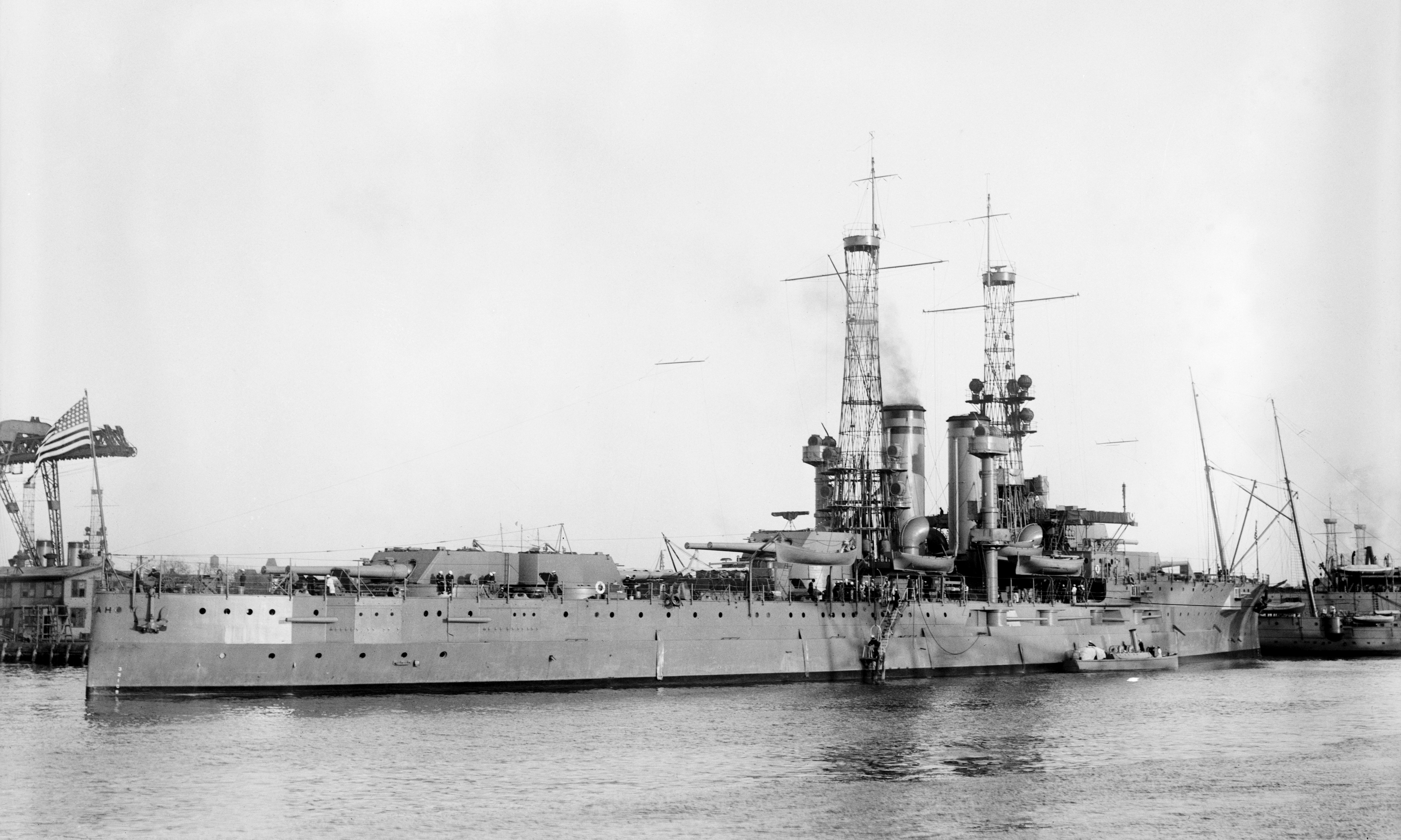
The USS Utah.

In early 1918, Little Wolf was transferred to the USS Utah and worked as part of the fire control team for one of the twelve-inch guns on the ship. He also won the Sixth Division’s lightweight boxing championship. The Captain H. H. Hough noted his “character[,] stalwart service and ability.” He left the Navy with the rank of Third-Class Petty Officer/Coxswan and was the leader of the crew serving the ships No. 1 forward gun.

In 1919, he returned to the states and was praised by his native peoples and Joseph K. Dixon.

== Post War ==
Following the war, Little Wolf married Margaret Snow with whom he had two children.

In 1924, Dixon succeeded in lobbying Congress to pass the Indian Citizenship Act and used examples of patriotism, including that of Little Wolf, to support his campaign.

In 1930, Little Wolf was living in Cass Lake working as a truck driver at a lumberyard. He also worked as a beadwork artist. In 1940, he worked as a sub-foreman and craftsman and in July of 1940, Little Wolf and John Wilson of Bemidji competed at the Bemidji–Minneapolis Aquatennial Canoe Derby, finishing in fifth place out of thirty-six teams.

In September of 1953, Little Wolf died and was buried at Fort Snelling National Cemetery.
