= Bejou =

Bejou can refer to a community in the United States:

- Bejou, Minnesota
- Bejou Township, Minnesota
