= White Earth River =

White Earth River may be either of two American rivers:

- White Earth River (Minnesota)
- White Earth River (North Dakota)
