= Mahkonce, Minnesota =

Unincorporated community in Minnesota, United States

- Unincorporated community
- Location within Minnesota Location within the United States
- Coordinates: 47°19′28″N 95°36′56″W
- Country: United States
- State: Minnesota
- County: Mahnomen
- Townships: Clover, Twin Lakes
- Elevation: 1,516 ft (462 m)
- Time zone: UTC-6 (Central (CST))
  - Summer (DST): UTC-5 (CDT)
- Area code: 218
- GNIS feature ID: 647382

Mahkonce is an unincorporated community in Clover and Twin Lakes townships, Mahnomen County, Minnesota, United States.
