= Heier =

Heier is a surname. Notable people with the surname include:

- Joacim Heier (born 1986), Norwegian footballer
- Knut S. Heier (1929–2008), Norwegian geochemist
- Melker Heier (born 2001), Swedish footballer
- Peter Heier (1895–1982), American priest
- Solfrid Heier (born 1945), Norwegian actress

== See also ==
- Heier Township, Mahnomen County, Minnesota
