= Wainchemahdub =

Chief of the Ojibwe tribe in Minnesota

Wenji-maadab (recorded in English as Wain-che-mah-dub, Wen-ge-mah-dub or Wendjimadub, meaning "Where He Moves From Sitting") (born March 10, 1840, died February 14, 1920, or 1921), was a Chief of the Ojibwe tribe at White Earth Reservation in Minnesota. He was a Mississippi Chippewa. During Wenji-maadab's time, chiefhood was no longer a meaningful position of leadership, but an honorary title bestowed by the United States government. However, Wenji-maadab was described by Gilfillan as "a genius, a truly, remarkably eloquent man...the best speaker, the greatest orator, I have ever met...his powers are remarkable. He has all the vehemence, the fire, the energy, command of language, range of thought, of the true orator."

Wenji-maadab's Christian name was Joseph Charette. He had three wives and thirteen children. He was a Civil War veteran for the Union Army and served as President in 1910 for The 14th June Association.
