= Rosedale Township =

Rosedale Township may refer to the following townships in the United States:

- Rosedale Township, Jersey County, Illinois
- Rosedale Township, Mahnomen County, Minnesota
