= USS Mahnomen County =

Landing ship in the US Navy

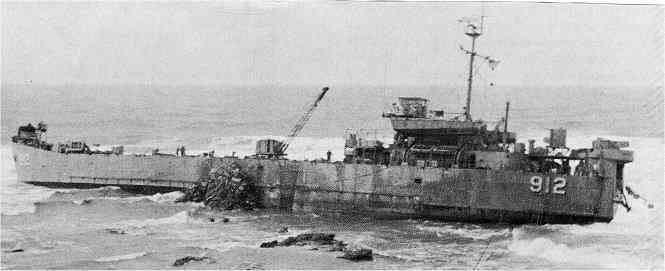
- USS Mahnomen County (LST-912) impaled on rocks off Chu Lai, South Vietnam

History

United States
- Name: LST-912 (1944–1955); Mahnomen County (1955–1967)
- Namesake: Mahnomen County, Minnesota
- Builder: Bethlehem-Hingham Shipyard, Hingham, Massachusetts
- Yard number: 3382
- Laid down: 5 February 1944
- Launched: 22 April 1944
- Commissioned: 21 May 1944
- Decommissioned: 25 August 1955
- Renamed: Mahnomen County, 1 July 1955
- Recommissioned: 27 March 1963
- Stricken: 31 July 1967
- Identification: Hull symbol: LST-912; Code letters: NVPQ
- Honors and awards: 4 battle stars (World War II); 2 campaign stars (Vietnam)
- Fate: ran aground, 30 December 1966 and demolished

General characteristics
- Class & type: LST-542-class tank landing ship
- Displacement: 1,625 long tons (1,651 t) (light); 4,080 long tons (4,145 t) (full (seagoing draft with 1,675 short tons (1,520 t) load); 2,366 long tons (2,404 t) (beaching)
- Length: 328 ft (100 m) oa
- Beam: 50 ft (15 m)
- Draft: Unloaded: 2 ft 4 in (0.71 m) forward; 7 ft 6 in (2.29 m) aft; Full load: 8 ft 3 in (2.51 m) forward; 14 ft 1 in (4.29 m) aft; Landing with 500 short tons (450 t) load: 3 ft 11 in (1.19 m) forward; 9 ft 10 in (3.00 m) aft; Limiting 11 ft 2 in (3.40 m); Maximum navigation 14 ft 1 in (4.29 m)
- Installed power: 2 × 900 hp (670 kW) Electro-Motive Diesel 12-567A diesel engines; 1,800 shp (1,300 kW)
- Propulsion: 1 × Falk main reduction gears; 2 × Propellers
- Speed: 11.6 kn (21.5 km/h; 13.3 mph)
- Range: 24,000 nmi (44,000 km; 28,000 mi) at 9 kn (17 km/h; 10 mph) while displacing 3,960 long tons (4,024 t)
- Boats & landing craft carried: 2 x LCVPs
- Capacity: 1,600–1,900 short tons (3,200,000–3,800,000 lb; 1,500,000–1,700,000 kg) cargo depending on mission
- Troops: 16 officers, 147 enlisted men
- Complement: 13 officers, 104 enlisted men
- Armament: Varied, ultimate armament; 2 × twin 40 mm (1.57 in) Bofors guns; 4 × single 40 mm Bofors guns; 12 × 20 mm (0.79 in) Oerlikon cannons

Service record
- Part of: LST Flotilla 8
- Operations: World War II; Western New Guinea operations; Morotai landing (15 September 1944); Leyte landings (5–18 November 1944); Lingayen Gulf landings (4–17 January 1945); Consolidation and capture of Southern Philippines; Palawan Island landings (28 February, 2 March, 6–7 March 1945); Mindanao Island landings (17–23 April 1945); Vietnam War; Vietnam Counteroffensive (27 May–7 June 1966); Vietnam Counteroffensive – Phase II (3–14 July, 26–29 September, 11–21 and 22–24 October, 15–25 November, 6–15 December 1966)
- Awards: World War II; Combat Action Ribbon; American Campaign Medal; Asiatic–Pacific Campaign Medal; World War II Victory Medal; Navy Occupation Service Medal w/Asia Clasp; Philippine Republic Presidential Unit Citation; Philippine Liberation Medal; Vietnam War; National Defense Service Medal; Vietnam Service Medal; Republic of Vietnam Gallantry Cross Unit Citation; Republic of Vietnam Campaign Medal

USS Mahnomen County (LST-912) was an LST-542-class tank landing ship built for the United States Navy during World War II. Like many of her class, she was not named and is properly referred to by her hull designation. She was later named after Mahnomen County, Minnesota, and was the only US Navy vessel to bear the name.

== Construction ==
LST-912 was laid down on 5 February 1944, at Hingham, Massachusetts, by the Bethlehem-Hingham Shipyard; launched on 22 April 1944; sponsored by Mrs. Hazel B. Leppe; and commissioned on 21 May 1944.

== Service history ==
=== World War II ===
Assigned to the 7th Amphibious Fleet, LST-912 sailed in convoy on 25 June, for the Admiralty Islands, via Bora Bora, Societies, and Nouméa, New Caledonia, arriving Seeadler Harbor, Manus on 23 August, to unload her cargo of one LCT and sections of another. She sailed for New Guinea on 8 September, arriving Humboldt Bay, Hollandia two days later for exercises until 22 September, when she departed for Morotai Island. Following her arrival 27 September, LST-912's guns helped drive off an enemy bomber which raided the harbor area.

On 29 September, LST-912 proceeded to Soemoe Island to embark men and equipment of the 113th Naval Construction Battalion for transfer to Hollandia. Despite harassment of her task unit by three enemy aircraft the next day, she reached Hollandia on 5 October. Five days later she moved on to "Pie Beach" to take on Army troops and equipment for the invasion of the Philippines. The landing ship joined a task group off Hollandia on 16 October, and, entering Leyte Gulf on 22 October, ran through the surf to land her soldiers at "White Beach." LST-912 then served as an emergency evacuation hospital, receiving six Army casualties 23 October, before retiring to Hollandia six days later.

On 3 November, the tank landing ship sailed to Wakde Airfield on Wakde Island off the coast of New Guinea to embark troops of the 303rd Airdrome Squadron for passage to Leyte. Just as she finished debarking her troops at "Yellow Beach," a Japanese A6M Zero roared in and began strafing the shore. Her guns quickly brought the plane down and LST-912 headed for New Guinea, arriving Hollandia six days later.

After loading equipment and personnel of the 79th Army Engineer Construction Battalion on 23 December, LST-912 sortied with a task group for Lingayen Gulf 26 December, via Sansapor, New Guinea. On the evening of 7 January 1945, a Japanese destroyer closing the formation in the Surigao Straits was intercepted and sunk. At 02:55 Japanese planes attacked the task group and three hours later a "Val" careened into the LST killing four men, the vessel's only wartime casualties.

Arriving off Lingayen Gulf on 9 January, LST-912 discharged her cargo and men on "White Beach" the next day. The next two days were spent under constant enemy fire until she steamed back to Leyte Gulf, arriving 17 January, to repeat the cycle.

Back in Leyte Gulf on 5 February, LST-912 took on units of the 13th Air Force on 17 February; landed the group at Mindoro Island, Philippines, 22 February; embarked parts of an Army Engineer Battalion of the 30th Quartermaster Company for the invasion of Palawan Island on 28 February; and departed Mindoro 26 February. The ship received four Army casualties at Puerto Princesa, Palawan for passage on 2 March, to Mindoro. She continued transport trips between Mindoro and Palawan until 12 March, when she departed for Manila with the 866th Engineer Aviation Battalion on board, arriving the following day.

Her next amphibious operation was Legaspi, Philippines, when she took LCM-468 in tow on 28 March, at Subic Bay, and arrived off Lemery, Luzon 30 March, to embark the 158th Regimental Combat Team for the invasion of Legaspi on 1 April, the last amphibious operation in the Philippines. LST-912 moved troop units in Legaspi through 8 April; then steamed for Mindoro, arriving Marguin Bay on 11 April.

After the landing ship debarked equipment at Zamboanga on 19 April, she departed for Pollac Harbor on 21 April, to disembark supply troops seven days later for the continuing effort to liberate the Philippines. On 29 April, LST-912 moved on to the next naval objective, the Borneo landings.

Following her arrival at Biak Island on 7 May, units of an RAAF airfield construction squadron came on board for an assault at Brunei Bay, Borneo on 10 June. While remaining off the beaches receiving casualties, she received orders on 18 July, to transport Australian service personnel to the Kuala Belait area.

She returned to Leyte Gulf on 26 July, and was there when the Japanese surrender was declared on 15 August. The LST was involved in occupation duties until December, visiting Morotai and Luzon, Philippines; Sendai and Yokosuka, Japan; and Guam before arriving at Iwo Jima on 20 December, to load Army supplies for the United States.

=== Post-war activities ===
LST-912 reached San Diego on 21 January 1946. Reassigned to the Atlantic Fleet, she sailed via the Panama Canal for the Gulf of Mexico on 30 January, arriving New Orleans on 20 February, to continue in commission with the 16th Reserve Fleet. On 30 October 1946, she was returned to active status and departed the Washington Navy Yard for two years of duty with the Amphibious Force at Little Creek, Virginia.

Assigned to the 6th Fleet in July 1948, LST-912 departed Morehead City, North Carolina on 5 September for Europe, arriving Tangiers 23 July. She cruised the Mediterranean into 1949, visiting Sicily; Tripoli, Libya; Bizerte, Tunisia; Malta; and Marseille, France, before returning to Morehead City on 6 February 1949. From 8 to 16 March, the landing ship participated in the annual Caribbean amphibious exercises of "Operation Springboard." LST-912 continued to conduct amphibious training out of Little Creek with occasional trips to the West Indies until 1955. From 28 July to 13 August 1952, she was anchored off Thule, Greenland, resupplying the American airfield as part of "Operation Bluejay."

LST-912 was placed in reserve in January 1955. On 1 July, she was renamed Mahnomen County. On 25 August, she decommissioned and entered the Atlantic Reserve Fleet at Green Cove Springs, Florida.

=== Vietnam War ===
Mahnomen County recommissioned at Philadelphia, Pennsylvania on 27 March 1963. Assigned to Reserve LST Squadron 2, she served for the next three years in the 5th Naval District, operating along the Atlantic coast from New York to the Bahamas.

On 21 December 1965, Mahnomen County was again placed in the active fleet; and on 27 January 1966, departed Little Creek for Charleston, South Carolina, arriving 29 December, to embark Army supplies. The next day she sailed for Southeast Asia with the Pulaski County and New London County, stopping at Pearl Harbor from 4 March to 21 April, before continuing on to South Vietnam via Okinawa, arriving Vung Tau on 27 May. She operated as a military transport and supply ship between Sasebo, Japan; Subic Bay, Philippine Islands; Kaohsiung, Taiwan; and Phan Rang, Vietnam through the next seven months, supporting the effort to curb Communist aggression in South Vietnam.

On 3 December Mahnomen County departed Kaohsiung for Vietnam, docking at Chu Lai on the 18th. On 30 December she was driven ashore by the 18 feet (5.5 m) surf and high winds of Typhoon Pamela. Attempts to refloat the wrecked LST during January 1967 were unsuccessful. Mahnomen County was struck from the Naval Vessel Register on 31 July 1967, and, stripped of any salvageable materials, her hull was demolished by the Navy Support Detachment at Chu Lai.

== Awards ==
Mahnomen County earned four battle stars for World War II service and two campaign stars for Vietnam War service.

== Bibliography ==
Online resources

- "LST-912". Dictionary of American Naval Fighting Ships. Naval History and Heritage Command. This article incorporates text from this source, which is in the public domain.
- "Mahnomen County". Dictionary of American Naval Fighting Ships. Naval History and Heritage Command. 5 August 2015. This article incorporates text from this source, which is in the public domain.
- "Bethlehem-Hingham, Hingham MA". ShipbuildingHistory.com. 11 August 2011.
- "USS Mahnomen (LST-912)". NavSource. 26 September 2015.
