= Gregory Township, Mahnomen County, Minnesota =

Gregory Township, Minnesota
- Township
- Location of Gregory Township, within Mahnomen County, Minnesota

- Location within the state of Minnesota Gregory Township, Minnesota (the United States)
- Coordinates: 47°27′16″N 95°50′33″W
- Country: United States
- State: Minnesota
- County: Mahnomen

Area
  - Total: 36.2 sq mi (93.7 km^{2})
  - Land: 35.1 sq mi (90.9 km^{2})
  - Water: 1.1 sq mi (2.8 km^{2})
- Elevation: 1,243 ft (379 m)

Population (2020)
  - Total: 75
  - Density: 2.1/sq mi (0.83/km^{2})
- Time zone: UTC-6 (Central (CST))
  - Summer (DST): UTC-5 (CDT)
- FIPS code: 27-25946
- GNIS feature ID: 0664353

Gregory Township is a township in Mahnomen County, Minnesota, United States. United States. The population was 75 at the 2020 census.

Gregory Township was named for Joseph Gregory, a pioneer settler.

== Geography ==
According to the United States Census Bureau, the township has a total area of 36.2 square miles (94 km^{2}), of which 35.1 square miles (91 km^{2}) of it is land and 1.1 square miles (2.8 km^{2}) of it (2.99%) is water.

== Demographics ==
As of the census of 2000, there were 97 people, 36 households, and 29 families residing in the township. The population density was 2.8 inhabitants per square mile (1.1/km^{2}). There were 42 housing units at an average density of 1.2 per square mile (0.46/km^{2}). The racial makeup of the township was 92.78% White, 5.15% Native American, and 2.06% from two or more races.

There were 36 households, out of which 27.8% had children under the age of 18 living with them, 72.2% were married couples living together, 5.6% had a female householder with no husband present, and 19.4% were non-families. 19.4% of all households were made up of individuals, and 13.9% had someone living alone who was 65 years of age or older. The average household size was 2.69 and the average family size was 3.10.

In the township the population was spread out, with 23.7% under the age of 18, 5.2% from 18 to 24, 28.9% from 25 to 44, 24.7% from 45 to 64, and 17.5% who were 65 years of age or older. The median age was 41 years. For every 100 females, there were 102.1 males. For every 100 females age 18 and over, there were 111.4 males.

The median income for a household in the township was $31,250, and the median income for a family was $31,875. Males had a median income of $22,917 versus $15,625 for females. The per capita income for the township was $14,656. There were 5.6% of families and 7.5% of the population living below the poverty line, including 11.1% of under eighteens and none of those over 64.
