= Richwood, Minnesota =

Unincorporated community in Minnesota, US

Richwood
- Unincorporated community
- Location within Minnesota Location within the United States
- Coordinates: 46°58′29″N 95°49′22″W
- Country: United States
- State: Minnesota
- County: Becker
- Elevation: 1,480 ft (450 m)
- Time zone: UTC-6 (Central (CST))
  - Summer (DST): UTC-5 (CDT)
- ZIP code: 56577
- Area code: 218
- GNIS feature ID: 650071

Richwood is an unincorporated community in Becker County, Minnesota, United States. Richwood is 4 miles (6.4 km) east of Callaway. Richwood has a post office with ZIP code 56577.
