= Marsh Creek Township, Mahnomen County, Minnesota =

Marsh Creek Township, Minnesota
- Township
- Location of Marsh Creek Township, within Mahnomen County, Minnesota

- Location within the state of Minnesota Marsh Creek Township, Minnesota (the United States)
- Coordinates: 47°20′40″N 95°59′37″W
- Country: United States
- State: Minnesota
- County: Mahnomen

Area
  - Total: 37.6 sq mi (97.5 km^{2})
  - Land: 37.6 sq mi (97.5 km^{2})
  - Water: 0 sq mi (0.0 km^{2})
- Elevation: 1,217 ft (371 m)

Population (2020)
  - Total: 141
  - Density: 3.75/sq mi (1.45/km^{2})
- Time zone: UTC-6 (Central (CST))
  - Summer (DST): UTC-5 (CDT)
- FIPS code: 27-40742
- GNIS feature ID: 0664920

Marsh Creek Township is a township in Mahnomen County, Minnesota, United States. The population was 141 at the 2020 census. It contains part of the census-designated place of Riverland.

This township was named for Marsh Creek.

== Geography ==
According to the United States Census Bureau, the township has a total area of 37.7 square miles (97.5 km^{2}), of which 37.7 square miles (97.5 km^{2}) of it is land and 0.03% is water.

== Demographics ==
As of the census of 2000, there were 128 people, 45 households, and 31 families residing in the township. The population density was 3.4 inhabitants per square mile (1.3/km^{2}). There were 46 housing units at an average density of 1.2 per square mile (0.46/km^{2}). The racial makeup of the township was 85.16% White, none Black or African American, 7.03% Native American, none Asian, none Pacific Islander, 1.56% from other races, and 6.25% from two or more races. Hispanic or Latino of any race were 1.56% of the population.

There were 45 households, out of which 37.8% had children under the age of 18 living with them, 62.2% were married couples living together, 6.7% had a female householder with no husband present, and 28.9% were non-families. 22.2% of all households were made up of individuals, and 17.8% had someone living alone who was 65 years of age or older. The average household size was 2.84 and the average family size was 3.41.

In the township the population was spread out, with 34.4% under the age of 18, 4.7% from 18 to 24, 29.7% from 25 to 44, 14.8% from 45 to 64, and 16.4% who were 65 years of age or older. The median age was 30 years. For every 100 females, there were 88.2 males. For every 100 females age 18 and over, there were 90.9 males.

The median income for a household in the township was $37,321, and the median income for a family was $45,417. Males had a median income of $20,000 versus $18,500 for females. The per capita income for the township was $13,599. There were 9.1% of families and 8.7% of the population living below the poverty line, including 2.4% of under eighteens and 17.9% of those over 64.
