= White Earth Land Recovery Project =

Minnesota nonprofit organization

The White Earth Land Recovery Project (WELRP) is a nonprofit, grassroots organization that seeks to recover land for the Anishinaabeg people on the White Earth Indian Reservation in western Minnesota and develop programs to achieve sustainability and environmental preservation. The organization was founded in 1989 by tribal member and former vice presidential candidate Winona LaDuke.

WELRP says that less than 10 percent of the land of the White Earth Indian Reservation is held by the Anishinaabeg. It seeks to regain lands that were taken from the Anishinaabeg people through improper sales, property theft and treaty abrogations in the 19th and 20th centuries. The organization also seeks to prevent the deforestation of the traditional lands of the Anishinaabeg.

According to its website, it seeks to 'build citizen participation involving environmental and cultural justice and preservation work, restoration of sustainable communities, renewable energy, media, and youth and leadership development programs.' It has led several conferences of indigenous communities on these issues, hosted and trained VISTA and other volunteers, developed school programs and curricula, and other initiatives.

Within these goals, WELRP has worked to revive cultivation and harvesting of wild rice, a traditional food of the people. It produces and sells traditional foods through its label, Native Harvest. The label currently offers wild rice, hominy, buffalo sausage, fry bread mix, chokecherry jelly, and raspberry preserves.

== Awards and recognition ==
The non-profit was recognized by the International Slow Food Congress for its efforts to restore local food systems and preserve wild rice.
