= Nelson Act of 1889 =

U.S. federal law to consolidate Native Americans

- Long title: An act for the relief and civilization of the Chippewa Indians in the State of Minnesota.
- Enacted by: the 50th United States Congress
- Effective: January 14, 1889

Citations
- Statutes at Large: 25 Stat. 642

Codification
- Acts amended: Dawes Act (expanded local application)

Legislative history
- Introduced in the Senate as S. 182 by Knute Nelson; Committee consideration by Senate Committee on Indian Affairs; Passed the Senate on; Passed the House on; Signed into law by President Grover Cleveland on January 14, 1889

United States Supreme Court cases
- Chippewa Indians of Minnesota v. United States, 301 U.S. 358 (1937)

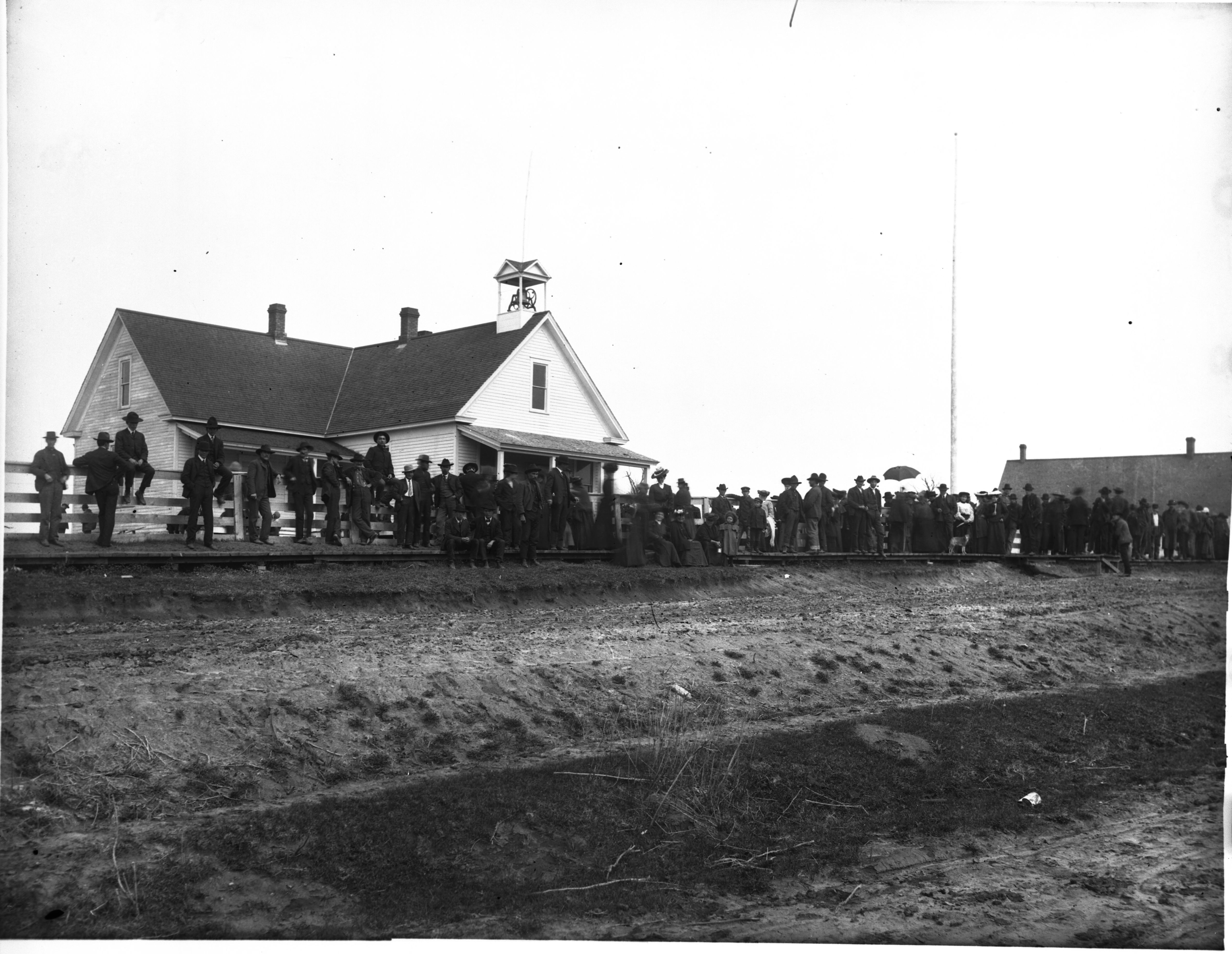
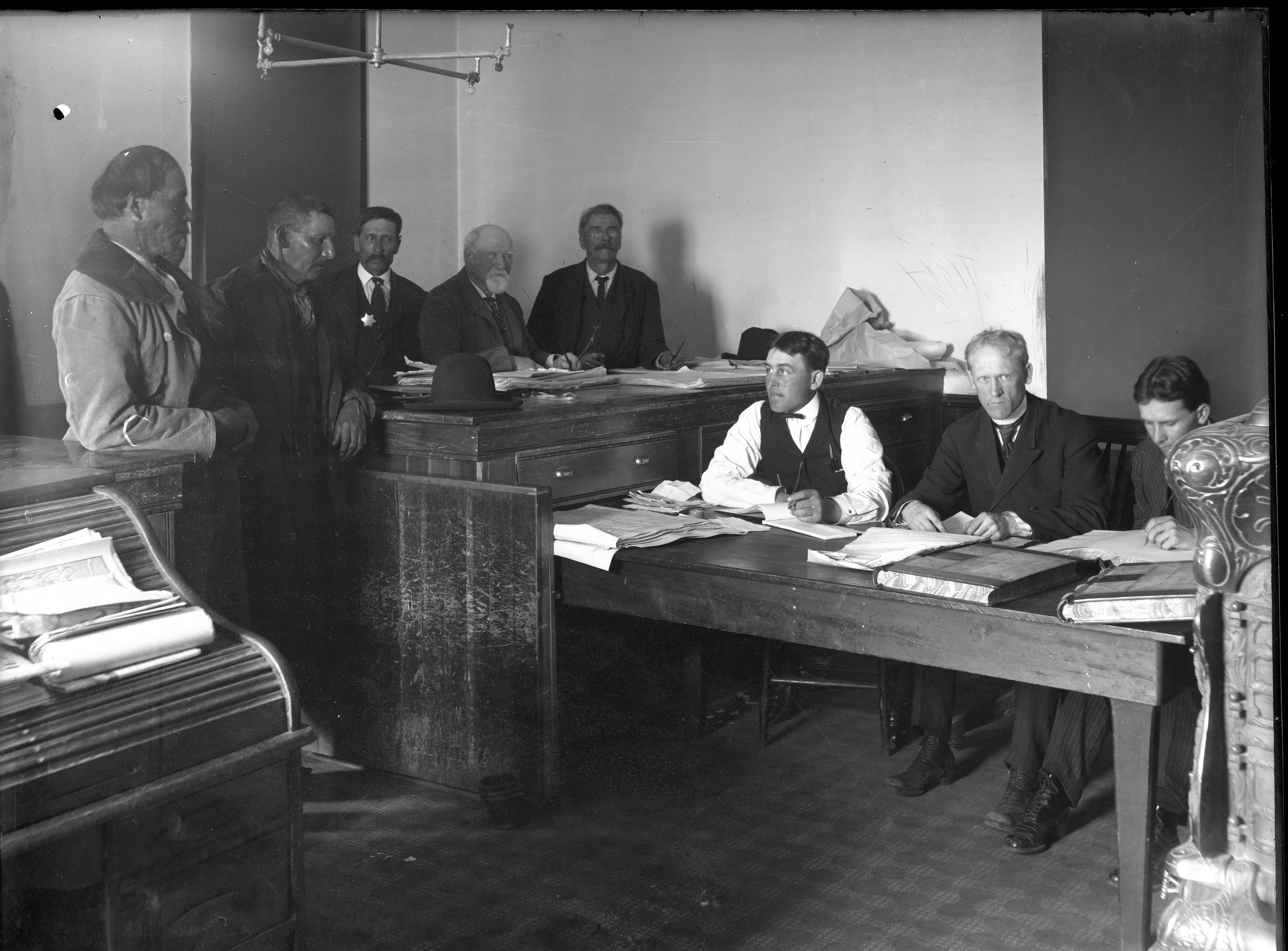
Ojibwe Indians awaiting their allotments at the White Earth Reservation

An act for the relief and civilization of the Chippewa Indians in the State of Minnesota (51st-1st-Ex.Doc.247; 25 Stat. 642), commonly known as the Nelson Act of 1889, was a United States federal law intended to relocate all the Anishinaabe people in Minnesota to the White Earth Indian Reservation in the western part of the state, and expropriate the vacated reservations for sale to non-Native settlers.

Approved by Congress on January 14, 1889, the Nelson Act was the equivalent for reservations in Minnesota to the Dawes Act of 1887, which had mandated allotting communal Indian lands to individual households in Indian Country, and selling the surplus. The goal of the Nelson Act was to consolidate Native Americans within the state of Minnesota on a western reservation, and, secondly, to encourage allotment of communal lands to individual households in order to encourage subsistence farming and assimilation. It reflected continuing tensions between whites and American Indians in the state. Especially after the Dakota Conflict of 1862, many Minnesota residents were eager to consolidate the reservations, reduce the amount of land controlled by Indians and make the surplus available for sale and settlement by non-Natives.

Minnesota congressmen Knute Nelson pushed for the allotment of Ojibwe lands in Northern Minnesota and sale of "surplus" to non-Natives. He and others intended to force the Ojibwe to relinquish most of their reservation lands. The intention was to relocate the peoples to the westernmost White Earth Reservation. All would receive individual allotments, with the remainder to be available for sale to non-Natives. The Red Lake Band of Chippewa agreed to a cession of 3,000,000 acres of land and kept the southern portion of their Reservation adjacent to Red Lake.

== Affected tribes ==
- Red Lake Band of Chippewa Indians
- Pembina Band of Chippewa Indians
- Winnebagoshish Band of Pillager Chippewa
- Leech Lake Band of Pillager Chippewa
- Cass Lake Band of Pillager Chippewa
- Otter Tail Lake Band of Pillager Chippewa
- Mille Lac Band of Mississippi Chippewa
- Fond du Lac Band of Lake Superior Chippewa
- Bois Forte Band of Chippewa Indians
- Grand Portage Band of Chippewa
- White Oak Point Band of Mississippi Chippewa
- Sandy Lake Band of Mississippi Chippewa
- Snake River Band of St. Croix Chippewa Indians
- and other scattered Indians belonging to said tribes not residing on any reservation.
