= Joseph Gilfillan =

Irish Episcopal missionary to Native Americans

Joseph Alexander Gilfillan (1838 – November 18, 1913) was an Episcopal missionary to Native Americans of the Ojibwa Tribe on White Earth Reservation in northern Minnesota during 35 years from 1873 until 1908.

== Biography ==
Joseph Alexander Gilfillan was born October 23, 1838, in Gorticross, County Londonderry, Ireland to Alexander Gilfillan and his wife Margaret. He married Harriet Woodbridge Cook April 19, 1877. He graduated from the General Theological Seminary, New York, in 1869. From 1869 until 1873 he was rector successively of two English churches in Minnesota. From June, 1873, until, September, 1908, he served as missionary to the Ojibwas at White Earth.

He worked hard to learn the Ojibwe language, to ascertain and record the origins of place names in the areas where he worked, to perform accurate translations of the Ojibwe place names into English, and to encourage that the names be recorded to continue to be used in one form or another after settlement.

Gilfillan's work was cited frequently by Warren Upham in his remarkable history of place names in Minnesota, "Minnesota Place Names, A Geographical Encyclopedia." Upham characterized Gilfillan's paper "Minnesota Geographical Names Derived from the Chippewa Language" as one of the two "most important resources of information on Minnesota geographic terms of Indian origin."

His wife Harriet considered life at White Earth a hardship, and often spent winters socializing in New York, occasionally in Europe.

Gilfillan retired in 1908 and went to Washington, D.C. He was the chief editor of the 1911 Ojibwa edition of the Book of Common Prayer entitled "Iu Wejibuewisi Mamawi Anamiawini Mazinaigun" ("Iw Wejibwewizi Maamawi-anami'aawini Mazina'igan").

Gilfillan died in New York City on November 18, 1913, after a year's illness.

The Minnesota Historical Society keeps a vast inventory of articles and reminiscences by Gilfillan and his wife Harriet on their missionary work; Gilfillan's translations of Ojibwe personal and place names and legends; letters (1883–1893) in Ojibwe from Ojibwe ministers and missionaries, with Gilfillan's translations; miscellaneous letters and memorabilia on Ojibwe language and culture and on church affairs; family and genealogical data; information on the erection of a monument to Gilfillan in Itasca State Park (1940); and articles by Harriet describing her work as a teacher of weaving among the Navaho Indians in 1875 and a trip on the Cumberland Canal. A Gilfillan article on the culture of Ojibwe, both Christian and non-Christian and with an emphasis on the Red Lake band, was published in Volume 9 of the Minnesota Historical Society Collections.
