= Little Elbow Township, Mahnomen County, Minnesota =

Coordinates: 47°11′29″N 95°37′12″W

Little Elbow Township, Minnesota
- Township
- Location of Little Elbow Township, within Mahnomen County, Minnesota

- Location within the state of Minnesota Little Elbow Township, Minnesota (the United States)
- Country: United States
- State: Minnesota
- County: Mahnomen

Area
  - Total: 35.79 sq mi (92.7 km^{2})
  - Land: 31.32 sq mi (81.1 km^{2})
  - Water: 4.47 sq mi (11.6 km^{2})

Population (2020)
  - Total: 318
  - Density: 10.2/sq mi (3.92/km^{2})
- Time zone: UTC-6 (Central (CST))
  - Summer (DST): UTC-5 (CDT)
- Area code: 218

Little Elbow Township is a township in Mahnomen County, Minnesota, United States. The population was 318 at the 2020 census. It contains part of the census-designated place of Twin Lakes.

== Geography ==
According to the United States Census Bureau, the township has a total area of 35.8 square miles (93 km^{2}), of which 31.3 square miles (81 km^{2}) of it is land and 4.5 square miles (12 km^{2}) of it (12.55%) is water.

== Demographics ==
As of the census of 2000, there were 225 people, 81 households, and 66 families residing in the township. The population density was 7.2 people per square mile (2.8/km^{2}). There were 282 housing units at an average density of 9.0/sq mi (3.5/km^{2}). The racial makeup of the township was 28.44% White, 66.67% Native American, 2.22% from other races, and 2.67% from two or more races. Hispanic or Latino of any race were 0.89% of the population.

There were 81 households, out of which 35.8% had children under the age of 18 living with them, 51.9% were married couples living together, 14.8% had a female householder with no husband present, and 18.5% were non-families. 17.3% of all households were made up of individuals, and 2.5% had someone living alone who was 65 years of age or older. The average household size was 2.78 and the average family size was 3.02.

In the township the population was spread out, with 31.6% under the age of 18, 9.3% from 18 to 24, 23.1% from 25 to 44, 26.7% from 45 to 64, and 9.3% who were 65 years of age or older. The median age was 38 years. For every 100 females, there were 104.5 males. For every 100 females age 18 and over, there were 116.9 males.

The median income for a household in the township was $21,750, and the median income for a family was $25,625. Males had a median income of $24,167 versus $20,625 for females. The per capita income for the township was $10,101. About 26.9% of families and 31.9% of the population were below the poverty line, including 53.1% of those under the age of 18 and 11.1% of those 65 or over.
