= La Garde Township, Mahnomen County, Minnesota =

La Garde Township, Minnesota
- Township
- Location of La Garde Township, within Mahnomen County, Minnesota

- Location within the state of Minnesota La Garde Township, Minnesota (the United States)
- Coordinates: 47°16′14″N 95°43′49″W
- Country: United States
- State: Minnesota
- County: Mahnomen

Area
  - Total: 35.8 sq mi (92.8 km^{2})
  - Land: 33.6 sq mi (87.0 km^{2})
  - Water: 2.2 sq mi (5.7 km^{2})
- Elevation: 1,480 ft (450 m)

Population (2020)
  - Total: 158
  - Density: 4.70/sq mi (1.82/km^{2})
- Time zone: UTC-6 (Central (CST))
  - Summer (DST): UTC-5 (CDT)
- FIPS code: 27-33956
- GNIS feature ID: 0664656

La Garde Township is a township in Mahnomen County, Minnesota, United States. It contains the census-designated places of Midway and The Ranch. The township was named for Moses Lagarde, an early settler. The population as of the 2020 census was 158 residents.

== Geography ==
According to the United States Census Bureau, the township has a total area of 35.8 square miles (93 km^{2}), of which 33.6 square miles (87 km^{2}) is land and 2.2 square miles (5.7 km^{2}) (6.17%) is water.

== Demographics ==
As of the 2020 census, 158 people, 55 housing units and 41 families.

There were 41 households, of which 53.7% had children under the age of 18 living with them, 41.5% were married couples living together. 22% of all households were made up of individuals and 17.1% had someone living alone who was 65 years of age or older. The average household size was 3.44 and the average family size was 3.81.

The population density was 4.1 per square mile (1.6/km^{2}). There were 55 housing units at an average density of 1.5 per square mile (0.58/km^{2}). The racial make-up of the township was 5% Hispanic/Latino, 50% White, 25% Native American and 17.7% from two or more races.

33.6% of the population were under the age of 18, 3.4% from 18 to 24, 30.2% from 15 to 44,66.4% from 18 years of age or older. The median age was 31.3 years. For every 100 females there were 190.2 males. There are 116 males and 61 females.

The median household income was $43,750 and the mean income was $64,607.
