= Mahnomen County, Minnesota =

County in Minnesota, United States

- County
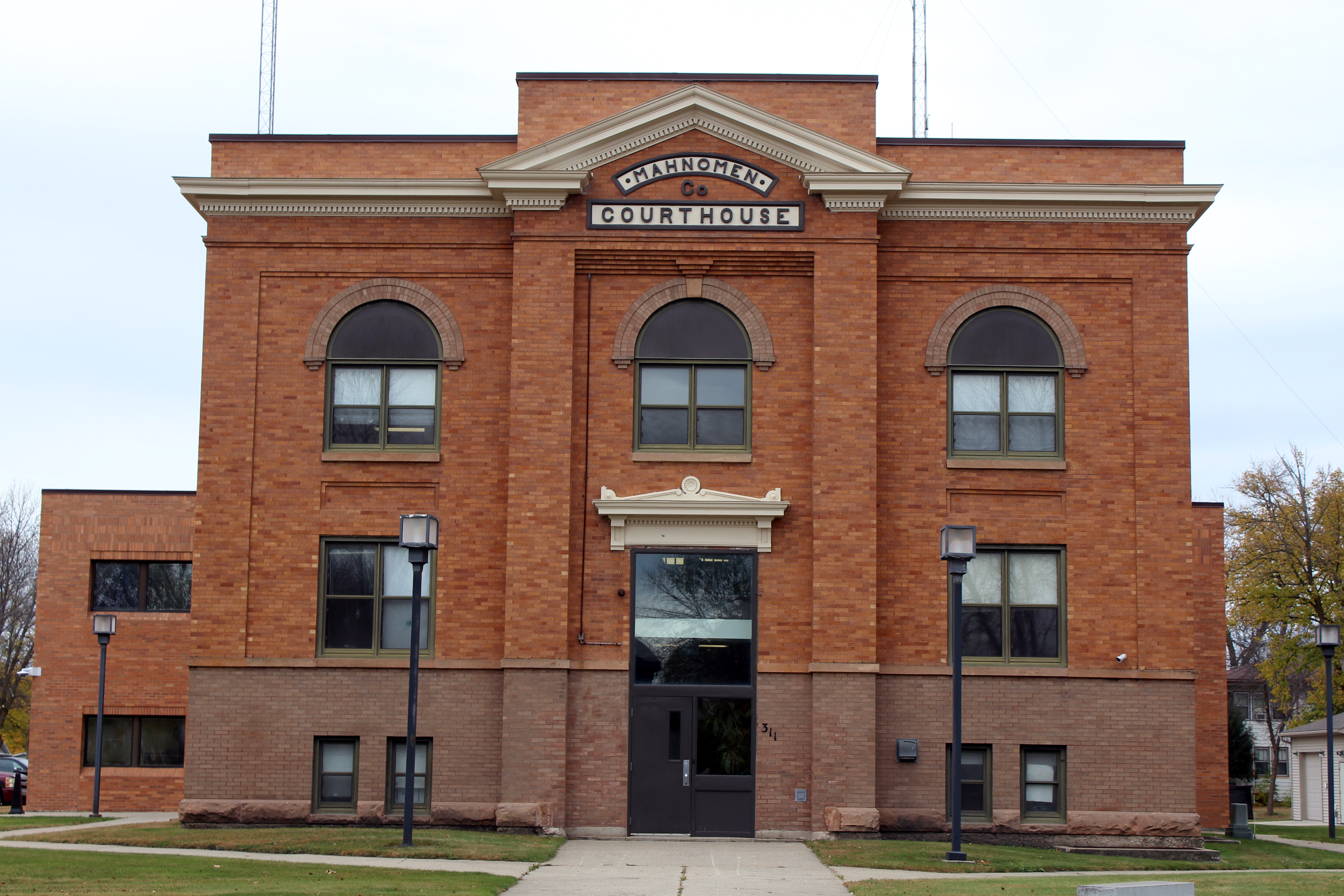
- Mahnomen County Courthouse

- Location within the U.S. state of Minnesota
- Coordinates: 47°20′N 95°49′W
- Country: United States
- State: Minnesota
- Founded: December 27, 1906
- Named for: Ojibwe word for wild rice
- Seat: Mahnomen
- Largest city: Mahnomen

Area
  - Total: 583 sq mi (1,510 km^{2})
  - Land: 558 sq mi (1,450 km^{2})
  - Water: 25 sq mi (65 km^{2}) 4.3%

Population (2020)
  - Total: 5,411
  - Estimate (2025): 5,153 ▼
  - Density: 9.7/sq mi (3.7/km^{2})
- Time zone: UTC−6 (Central)
  - Summer (DST): UTC−5 (CDT)
- Congressional district: 7th
- Website: www.mahnomencounty.gov

Mahnomen County (/məˈnoʊmən/ mə-NOH-mən) is a county in the U.S. state of Minnesota. As of the 2020 census, the population was 5,411. Its county seat is Mahnomen.

The county is part of the White Earth Indian Reservation. It is the only county in Minnesota entirely within an Indian reservation. Mahnomen, East Polk, and Becker counties constitute one of northwestern Minnesota's biggest cattle-raising areas.

== History ==
The county was created from the east half of Norman County on December 27, 1906, with Mahnomen, a former railway station town, as the county seat. The county was named for the town, the name of which is one spelling of the Ojibwe word for "wild rice".

From 1857 to 1858, similarly named Manomin County existed in Minnesota, which merged into Anoka County.

== Geography ==
The Wild Rice River enters the county from Clearwater County and flows west through the central part of the county. The White Earth River originates from White Earth Lake on the county's southern border and flows northwest to its confluence with the Wild Rice near Mahnomen. The county terrain consists of low rolling hills, carved with drainages. The eastern part of the county is dotted with lakes and ponds and largely wooded. All non-wooded areas are devoted to agriculture where possible. The county slopes to the west and north, with its highest point near the middle of the east border, at 1,825 ft (556 m) ASL. The county has an area of 583 square miles (1,510 km^{2}), of which 558 square miles (1,450 km^{2}) is land and 25 square miles (65 km^{2}) (4.3%) is water. Mahnomen is one of 17 Minnesota savanna region counties with more savanna soils than either prairie or forest soils.

Soils of Mahnomen County

=== Major highways ===
- U.S. Highway 59
- Minnesota State Highway 113
- Minnesota State Highway 200

=== Airports ===
- Mahnomen County Airport (3N8) - south of Mahnomen

=== Adjacent counties ===
- Polk County - north
- Clearwater County - east
- Becker County - south
- Norman County - west

=== Protected areas ===
- Beaulife State Wildlife Management Area
- Bejou State Wildlife Management Area
- Budde Meadow State Wildlife Management Area
- Dittmer State Wildlife Management Area
- Foot State Wildlife Management Area
- Hasselton State Wildlife Management Area (part)
- Loncrace State Wildlife Management Area
- Mahgre State Wildlife Management Area
- Rush Lake State Wildlife Management Area
- Santee Prairie Scientific and Natural Area
- Wambach State Wildlife Management Area
- Warren Lake State Wildlife Management Area

== Demographics ==
Historical population
Census	Pop.	Note	%±
1910	3,249		—
1920	6,197		90.7%
1930	6,153		−0.7%
1940	8,054		30.9%
1950	7,059		−12.4%
1960	6,341		−10.2%
1970	5,638		−11.1%
1980	5,535		−1.8%
1990	5,044		−8.9%
2000	5,190		2.9%
2010	5,413		4.3%
2020	5,411		0.0%
2025 (est.)	5,153	▼	−4.8%
U.S. Decennial Census; 1790-1960 1900-1990; 1990-2000 2010-2020

=== Racial and ethnic composition ===
Mahnomen County, Minnesota – Racial and ethnic composition Note: the US Census treats Hispanic/Latino as an ethnic category. This table excludes Latinos from the racial categories and assigns them to a separate category. Hispanics/Latinos may be of any race.
Race / Ethnicity (NH = Non-Hispanic)	Pop 1980	Pop 1990	Pop 2000	Pop 2010	Pop 2020	% 1980	% 1990	% 2000	% 2010	% 2020
White alone (NH)	4,508	3,827	3,252	2,698	2,278	81.45%	75.87%	62.66%	49.84%	42.10%
Black or African American alone (NH)	1	1	7	11	8	0.02%	0.02%	0.13%	0.20%	0.15%
Native American or Alaska Native alone (NH)	990	1,184	1,465	2,148	2,256	17.89%	23.47%	28.23%	39.68%	41.69%
Asian alone (NH)	9	5	3	3	7	0.16%	0.10%	0.06%	0.06%	0.13%
Native Hawaiian or Pacific Islander alone (NH)	x	x	0	1	0	x	x	0.00%	0.02%	0.00%
Other race alone (NH)	0	0	6	0	17	0.00%	0.00%	0.12%	0.00%	0.31%
Mixed race or Multiracial (NH)	x	x	411	453	691	x	x	7.92%	8.37%	12.77%
Hispanic or Latino (any race)	27	27	46	99	154	0.49%	0.54%	0.89%	1.83%	2.85%
Total	5,535	5,044	5,190	5,413	5,411	100.00%	100.00%	100.00%	100.00%	100.00%

=== 2020 census ===
As of the 2020 census, the county had a population of 5,411. The median age was 38.7 years. 28.7% of residents were under the age of 18 and 19.8% of residents were 65 years of age or older. For every 100 females there were 100.0 males, and for every 100 females age 18 and over there were 98.7 males age 18 and over.

The racial makeup of the county was 42.6% White, 0.1% Black or African American, 42.9% American Indian and Alaska Native, 0.1% Asian, <0.1% Native Hawaiian and Pacific Islander, 0.7% from some other race, and 13.5% from two or more races. Hispanic or Latino residents of any race comprised 2.8% of the population.

<0.1% of residents lived in urban areas, while 100.0% lived in rural areas.

There were 2,014 households in the county, of which 32.8% had children under the age of 18 living in them. Of all households, 39.0% were married-couple households, 20.2% were households with a male householder and no spouse or partner present, and 28.2% were households with a female householder and no spouse or partner present. About 28.5% of all households were made up of individuals and 16.0% had someone living alone who was 65 years of age or older.

There were 2,550 housing units, of which 21.0% were vacant. Among occupied housing units, 68.2% were owner-occupied and 31.8% were renter-occupied. The homeowner vacancy rate was 0.8% and the rental vacancy rate was 3.6%.

=== 2000 census ===
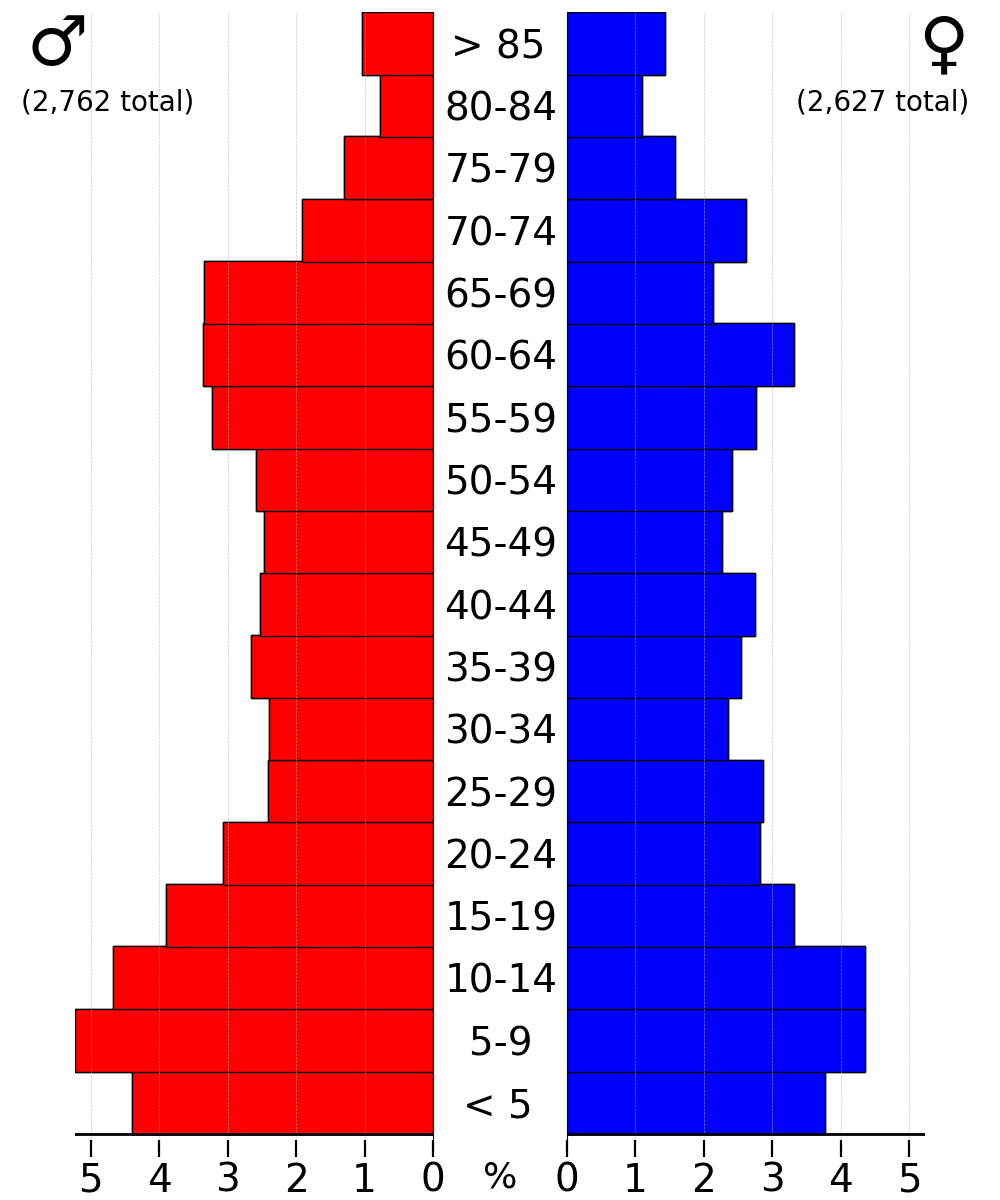
2022 US Census population pyramid for Mahnomen County, from ACS 5-year estimates

As of the census of 2000, there were 5,190 people, 1,969 households, and 1,366 families in the county. The population density was 9.3 per square mile (3.6/km^{2}). There were 2,700 housing units at an average density of 4.84 per square mile (1.87/km^{2}). The racial makeup of the county was 62.85% White (3,262 people) 0.13% Black or African American (7 people), 28.55% Native American (1,482 people), 0.06% Asian (3 people), 0.31% from other races (16 people), and 8.09% (420 people) from two or more races. 0.89% of the population (46 people) were Hispanic or Latino of any race. 29.4% (1525 people) were of German and 17.0% (882 people) Norwegian ancestry.

There were 1,969 households, out of which 32.40% had children under the age of 18 living with them, 51.60% were married couples living together, 11.60% had a female householder with no husband present, and 30.60% were non-families. 27.00% of all households were made up of individuals, and 14.90% had someone living alone who was 65 years of age or older. The average household size was 2.60 and the average family size was 3.14.

The county population contained 29.20% under the age of 18, 7.20% from 18 to 24, 23.50% from 25 to 44, 23.40% from 45 to 64, and 16.70% who were 65 years of age or older. The median age was 38 years. For every 100 females there were 102.90 males. For every 100 females age 18 and over, there were 98.40 males.

The median income for a household in the county was $30,053, and the median income for a family was $35,500. Males had a median income of $23,614 versus $21,000 for females. The per capita income for the county was $13,438. About 11.80% of families and 16.70% of the population were below the poverty line, including 21.30% of those under age 18 and 15.30% of those age 65 or over.

== Communities ==
=== Cities ===
- Bejou
- Mahnomen (county seat)
- Waubun

=== Census-designated places ===
- Beaulieu
- Midway
- Naytahwaush
- Pine Bend
- Riverland
- Roy Lake
- The Ranch
- Twin Lakes
- West Roy Lake

=== Unincorporated community ===
- Mahkonce

Townships of Mahnomen County

=== Townships ===
- Beaulieu Township
- Bejou Township
- Chief Township
- Clover Township
- Gregory Township
- Heier Township
- Island Lake Township
- La Garde Township
- Lake Grove Township
- Little Elbow Township
- Marsh Creek Township
- Oakland Township
- Pembina Township
- Popple Grove Township
- Rosedale Township
- Twin Lakes Township

== Government and politics ==
For several decades, Mahnomen County voters have tended to vote Democratic. As of 2020, the county has selected the Democratic candidate in six of the past ten presidential elections. However, since 2016, the county has trended Republican, voting for Donald Trump all three times, with Trump increasing his vote share in 2020 and 2024, receiving 53% of the vote in 2024. The county also voted Republican by double-digit margins for every statewide office in the 2022 Midterm Elections, potentially signifying a realignment.

United States presidential election results for Mahnomen County, Minnesota
Year	Republican		Democratic		Third party(ies)	
Year	No.	%	No.	%	No.	%
1908	265	53.64%	143	28.95%	86	17.41%
1912	68	10.88%	293	46.88%	264	42.24%
1916	262	36.39%	411	57.08%	47	6.53%
1920	1,076	71.97%	215	14.38%	204	13.65%
1924	629	33.69%	122	6.53%	1,116	59.78%
1928	606	29.90%	1,378	67.98%	43	2.12%
1932	264	12.76%	1,734	83.81%	71	3.43%
1936	474	18.00%	2,025	76.88%	135	5.13%
1940	1,069	35.14%	1,959	64.40%	14	0.46%
1944	748	33.10%	1,494	66.11%	18	0.80%
1948	579	20.86%	2,125	76.58%	71	2.56%
1952	1,220	45.86%	1,436	53.98%	4	0.15%
1956	875	36.58%	1,513	63.25%	4	0.17%
1960	880	32.01%	1,864	67.81%	5	0.18%
1964	648	24.74%	1,967	75.11%	4	0.15%
1968	893	34.28%	1,508	57.89%	204	7.83%
1972	1,246	46.30%	1,397	51.91%	48	1.78%
1976	905	34.63%	1,590	60.85%	118	4.52%
1980	1,275	48.39%	1,175	44.59%	185	7.02%
1984	1,328	51.14%	1,241	47.79%	28	1.08%
1988	1,051	44.57%	1,277	54.16%	30	1.27%
1992	854	35.75%	1,035	43.32%	500	20.93%
1996	877	39.70%	1,026	46.45%	306	13.85%
2000	1,122	50.45%	921	41.41%	181	8.14%
2004	1,132	45.14%	1,339	53.39%	37	1.48%
2008	843	35.98%	1,436	61.29%	64	2.73%
2012	871	39.92%	1,276	58.48%	35	1.60%
2016	991	47.46%	930	44.54%	167	8.00%
2020	1,142	49.57%	1,112	48.26%	50	2.17%
2024	1,165	53.37%	975	44.66%	43	1.97%

County Board of Commissioners
Position	Name	District	Next Election
Commissioner and Vice Chair	Darvin Schoenborn	District 1	2024
Commissioner and Chairperson	David Geray	District 2	2026
Commissioner	Larry Olson	District 3	2024
Commissioner	Karen Ahmann	District 4	2026
Commissioner	John Darco	District 5	2024

State Legislature (2018-2020)
Position	Name	Affiliation	District
Senate	Steve Green	Republican	District 2
House of Representatives	Matt Bliss	Republican	District 2B

U.S Congress (2022-2025)
Position	Name	Affiliation	District
House of Representatives	Pete Stauber	Republican	8th
Senate	Amy Klobuchar	Democrat	N/A
Senate	Tina Smith	Democrat	N/A

== See also ==
- National Register of Historic Places listings in Minnesota § Mahnomen County
- USS Mahnomen County (LST-912)
