= Twin Lakes, Mahnomen County, Minnesota =

Census-designated place in Minnesota, US

Twin Lakes, Minnesota
- Census-designated place
- Location within Minnesota Location within the United States
- Coordinates: 47°13′34″N 95°39′20″W
- Country: United States
- State: Minnesota
- County: Mahnomen
- Townships: Little Elbow; Twin Lakes

Area
  - Total: 4.27 sq mi (11.07 km^{2})
  - Land: 2.67 sq mi (6.92 km^{2})
  - Water: 1.60 sq mi (4.15 km^{2})
- Elevation: 1,447 ft (441 m)

Population (2020)
  - Total: 192
  - Density: 71.8/sq mi (27.73/km^{2})
- Time zone: UTC-6 (Central (CST))
  - Summer (DST): UTC-5 (CDT)
- ZIP Codes: 56589 (Waubun); 56566 (Naytahwaush)
- Area code: 218
- FIPS code: 27-65927
- GNIS feature ID: 2583782

Twin Lakes is a census-designated place in the townships of Little Elbow and Twin Lakes, Mahnomen County, Minnesota, United States. Its population was 192 as of the 2020 census, up from 149 in 2010.

== Geography ==
The Twin Lakes CDP is in southeastern Mahnomen County, mostly in the northwest part of Little Elbow Township but extending north into the southwest part of Twin Lakes Township. Most of South Twin Lake is within the CDP, and the northern edge of the CDP follows the south shore of North Twin Lake. The community is 2 miles (3 km) south of Naytahwaush, 18 miles (29 km) east-northeast of Waubun, and the same distance east-southeast of Mahnomen, the county seat.

According to the U.S. Census Bureau, the Twin Lakes CDP has a total area of 4.27 square miles (11.1 km^{2}), of which 2.67 square miles (6.9 km^{2}) are land and 1.60 square miles (4.1 km^{2}), or 37.5%, are water.

== Demographics ==
Historical population
Census	Pop.	Note	%±
2010	149		—
2020	192		28.9%
U.S. Decennial Census

== Education ==
The community is served by Mahnomen ISD 432.
