= Bejou, Minnesota =

City in Minnesota, United States

- City
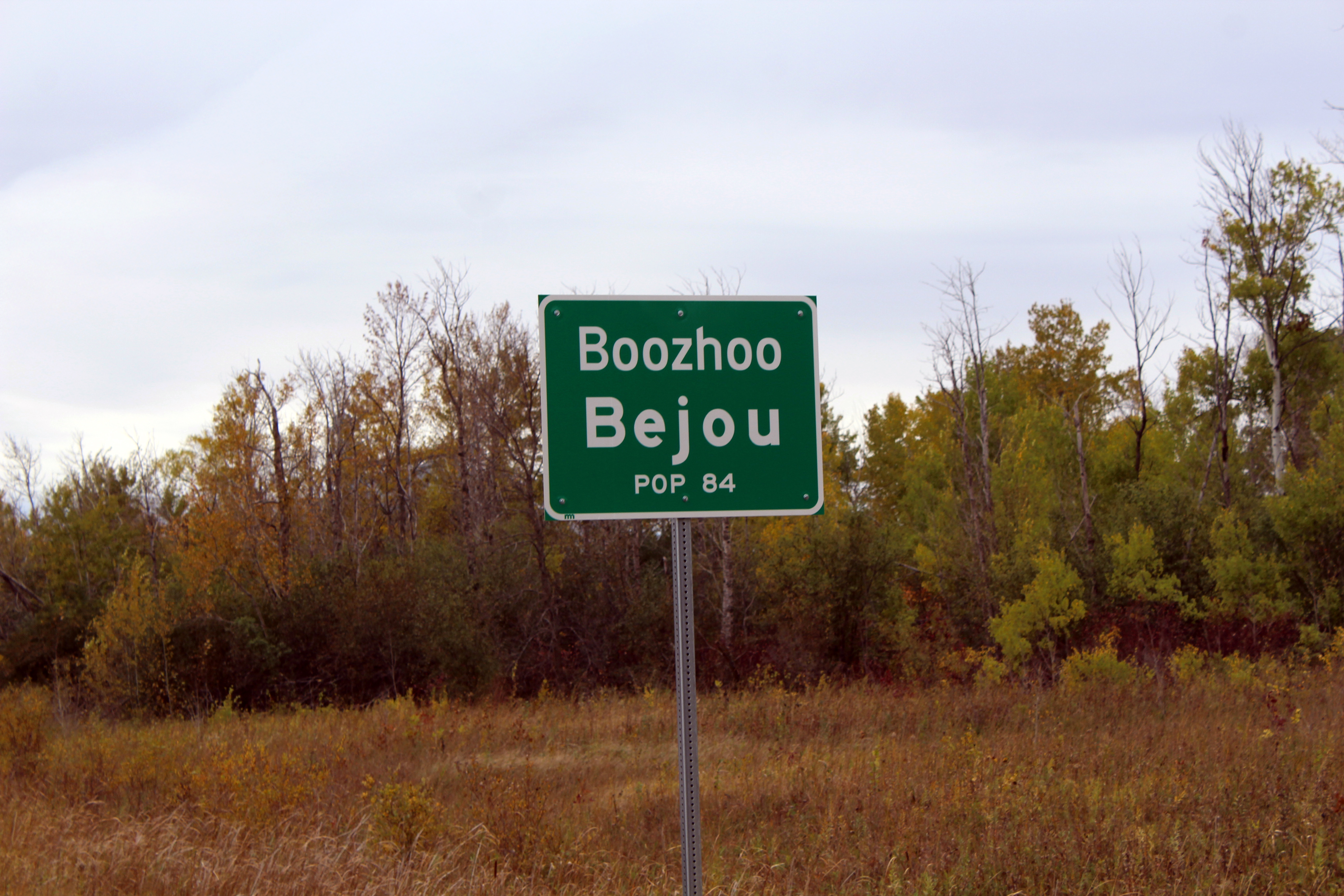
- City limit sign with "Boozhoo," an Ojibwe greeting meaning "hello"

- Location in Mahnomen County and the state of Minnesota
- Coordinates: 47°26′34″N 95°58′22″W
- Country: United States
- State: Minnesota
- County: Mahnomen

Area
  - Total: 0.29 sq mi (0.74 km^{2})
  - Land: 0.29 sq mi (0.74 km^{2})
  - Water: 0 sq mi (0.00 km^{2})
- Elevation: 1,224 ft (373 m)

Population (2020)
  - Total: 84
  - Density: 293.1/sq mi (113.15/km^{2})
- Time zone: UTC-6 (Central (CST))
  - Summer (DST): UTC-5 (CDT)
- ZIP code: 56516
- Area code: 218
- FIPS code: 27-04672
- GNIS feature ID: 2394107

Bejou (/ˈbiːʒu/ BEE-zhoo) is a city in Mahnomen County, Minnesota, United States. The population was 84 at the 2020 census. It is contained wholly within the White Earth Indian Reservation.

== History ==
A post office called Bejou has been in operation since 1906. Some sources state that the town got its name from a corruption of the French word Bonjour, reasoning that the name is related to the Ojibwe word Boozhoo. However, these two words are linguistic false friends, and are not etymologically related. The town's name likely comes from the Ojibwe word bizhiw meaning "lynx", a type of cat indigenous to North America, and one of the doodems of the Ojibwe people.

== Geography ==
Bejou is in northwestern Mahnomen County along U.S. Route 59, which leads south 8 miles (13 km) to Mahnomen, the county seat, and north 16 miles (26 km) to Erskine. According to the U.S. Census Bureau, the city has a total area of 0.29 square miles (0.75 km^{2}), all of it land. The city drains west to Marsh Creek, a southwest-flowing tributary of the Wild Rice River, part of the Red River watershed.

The city is in the northwest part of the White Earth Indian Reservation, which includes all of Mahnomen County plus parts of neighboring counties to the east and south.

== Demographics ==
Historical population
Census	Pop.	Note	%±
1930	99		—
1940	200		102.0%
1950	173		−13.5%
1960	164		−5.2%
1970	157		−4.3%
1980	109		−30.6%
1990	110		0.9%
2000	94		−14.5%
2010	89		−5.3%
2020	84		−5.6%
U.S. Decennial Census

=== 2010 census ===
As of the census of 2010, there were 89 people, 37 households, and 21 families residing in the city. The population density was 222.5 inhabitants per square mile (85.9/km^{2}). There were 42 housing units at an average density of 105.0 per square mile (40.5/km^{2}). The racial makeup of the city was 76.4% White, 18.0% Native American, 1.1% Asian, and 4.5% from two or more races.

There were 37 households, of which 18.9% had children under the age of 18 living with them, 40.5% were married couples living together, 8.1% had a female householder with no husband present, 8.1% had a male householder with no wife present, and 43.2% were non-families. 37.8% of all households were made up of individuals, and 10.8% had someone living alone who was 65 years of age or older. The average household size was 2.41 and the average family size was 3.24.

The median age in the city was 45.5 years. 22.5% of residents were under the age of 18; 7.9% were between the ages of 18 and 24; 17.9% were from 25 to 44; 38.1% were from 45 to 64; and 13.5% were 65 years of age or older. The gender makeup of the city was 52.8% male and 47.2% female.

=== 2000 census ===
As of the census of 2000, there were 94 people, 36 households, and 24 families residing in the city. The population density was 250.1 inhabitants per square mile (96.6/km^{2}). There were 46 housing units at an average density of 122.4 per square mile (47.3/km^{2}). The racial makeup of the city was 82.98% White, 10.64% Native American, and 6.38% from two or more races.

There were 36 households, out of which 36.1% had children under the age of 18 living with them, 58.3% were married couples living together, 8.3% had a female householder with no husband present, and 30.6% were non-families. 30.6% of all households were made up of individuals, and 19.4% had someone living alone who was 65 years of age or older. The average household size was 2.61 and the average family size was 3.28.

In the city, the population was spread out, with 29.8% under the age of 18, 7.4% from 18 to 24, 29.8% from 25 to 44, 18.1% from 45 to 64, and 14.9% who were 65 years of age or older. The median age was 36 years. For every 100 females, there were 123.8 males. For every 100 females age 18 and over, there were 112.9 males.

The median income for a household in the city was $32,750, and the median income for a family was $33,281. Males had a median income of $26,250 versus $9,688 for females. The per capita income for the city was $10,210. There were 13.8% of families and 12.0% of the population living below the poverty line, including 11.4% of under eighteens and 28.6% of those over 64.

== Gallery ==
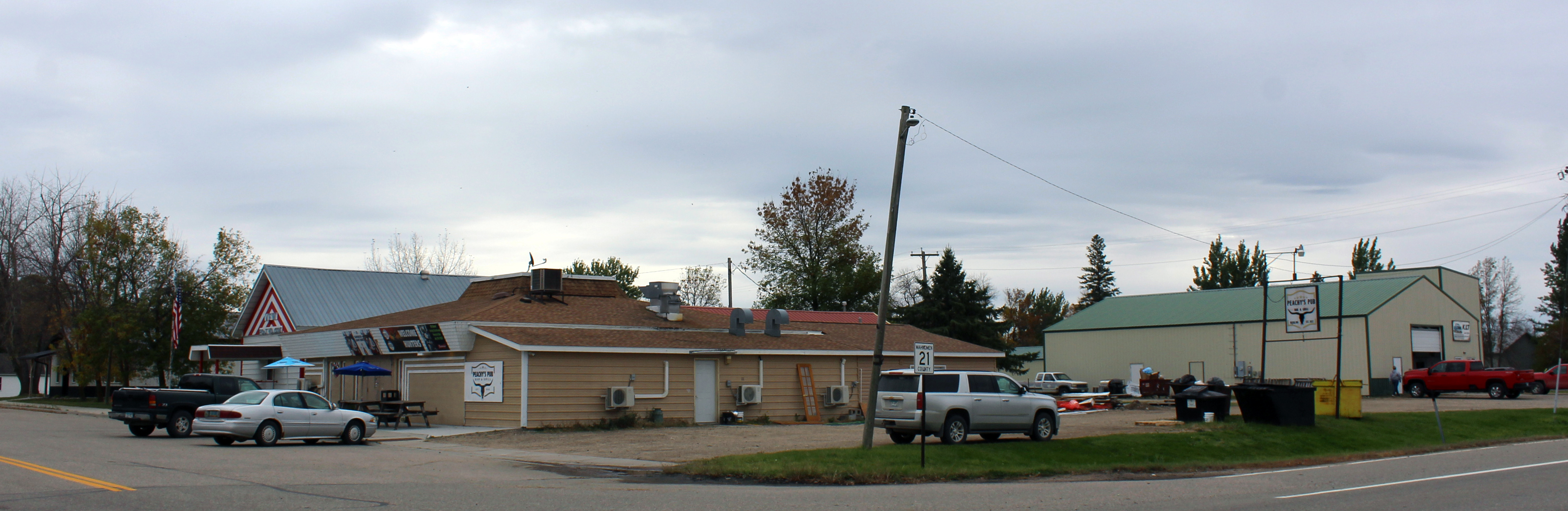
Commercial area

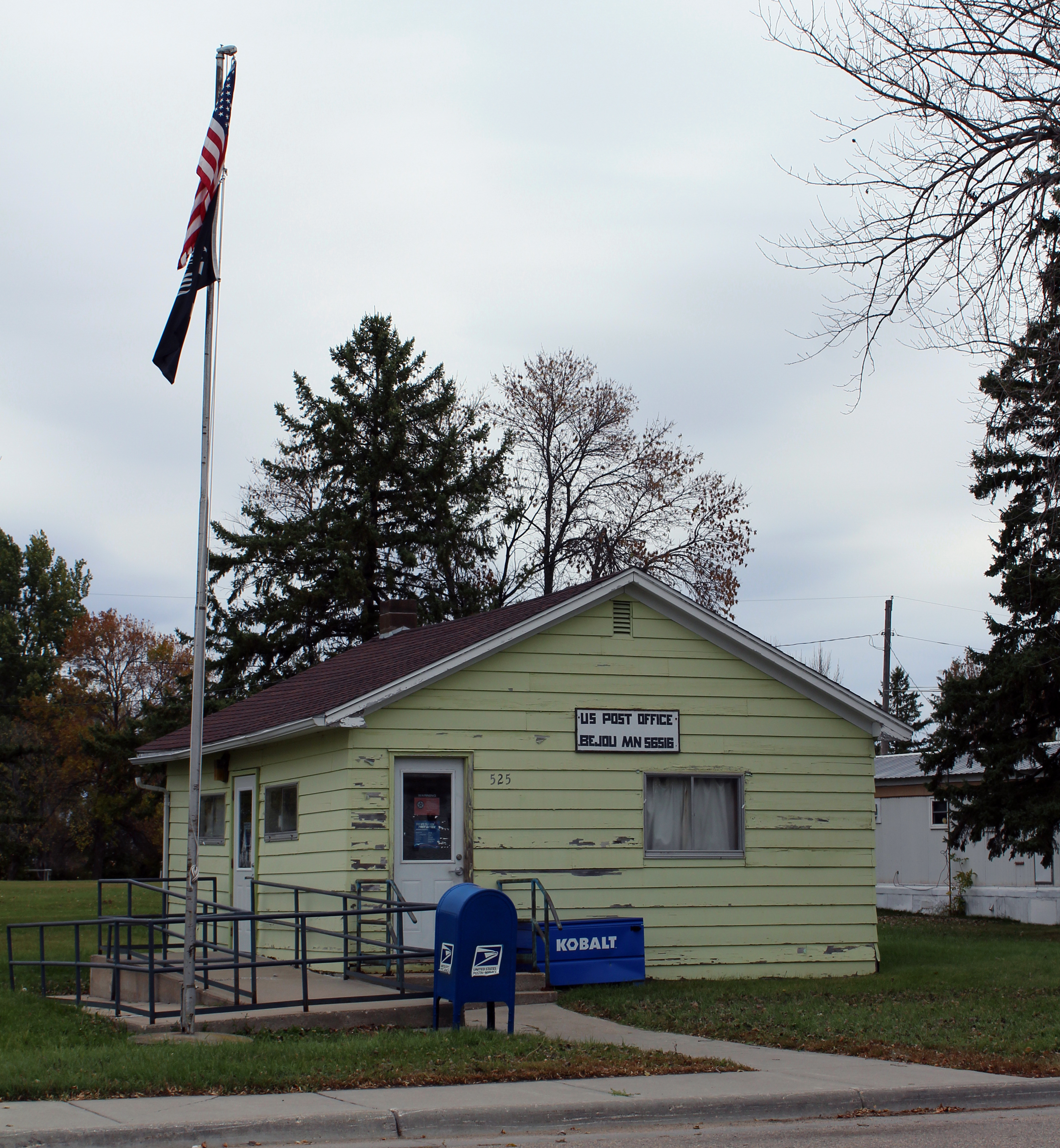
United States Post Office

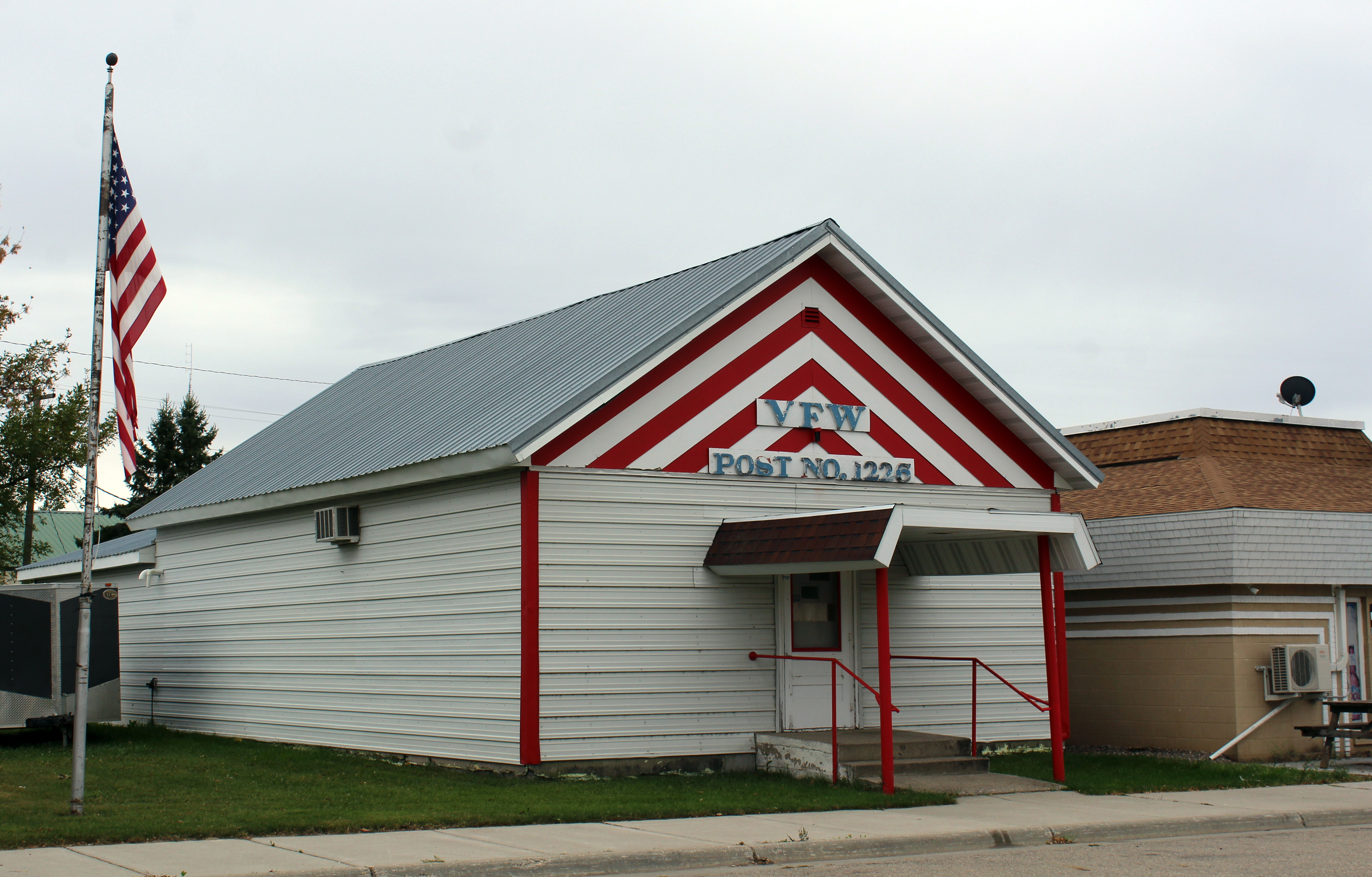
VFW Post 1226
