= Callaway, Minnesota =

City in Minnesota, United States

Callaway
- City
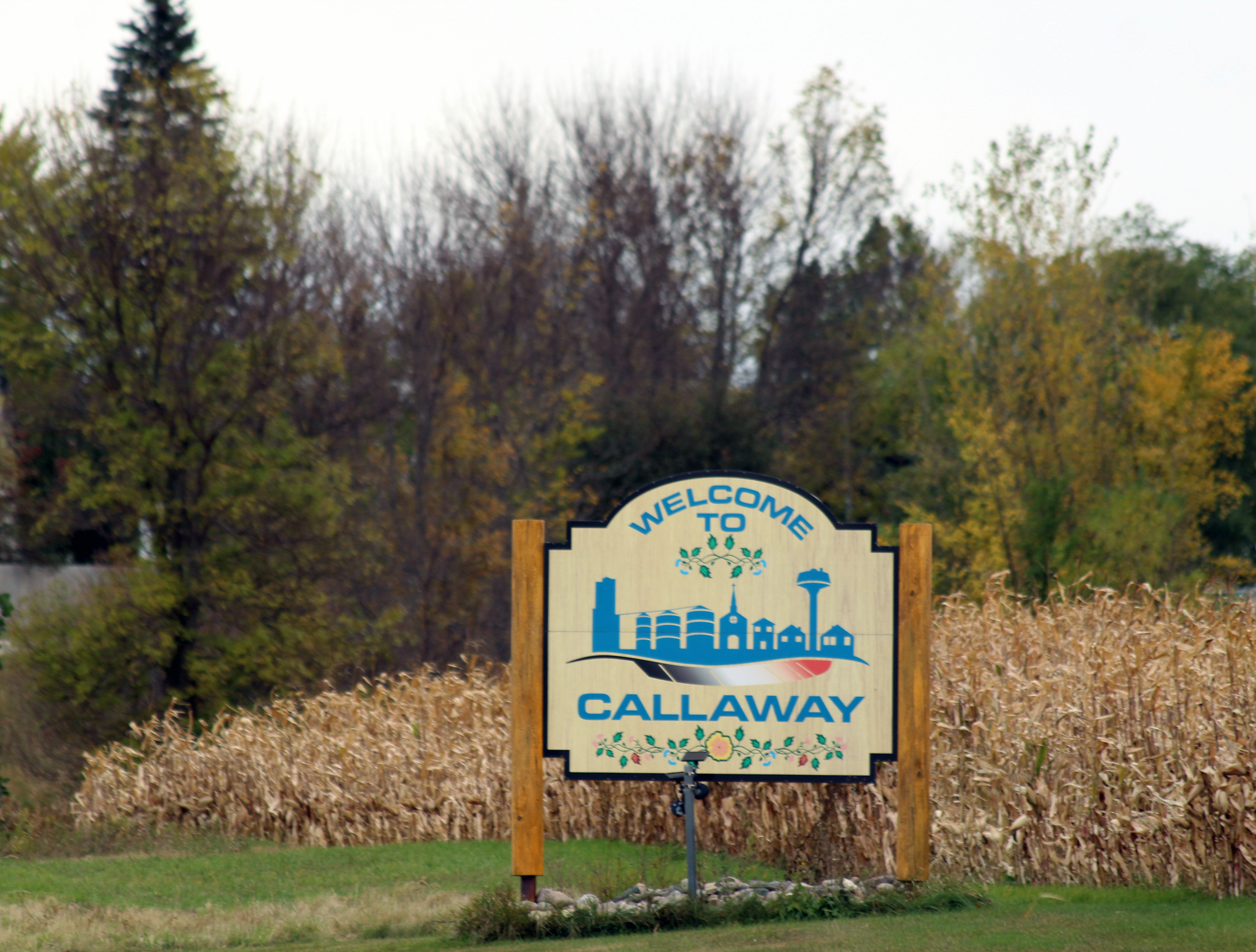
- Welcome sign

- Location of Callaway, Minnesota
- Coordinates: 46°58′59″N 95°54′31″W
- Country: United States
- State: Minnesota
- County: Becker

Area
  - Total: 0.63 sq mi (1.63 km^{2})
  - Land: 0.63 sq mi (1.62 km^{2})
  - Water: 0 sq mi (0.00 km^{2})
- Elevation: 1,385 ft (422 m)

Population (2020)
  - Total: 178
  - Estimate (2021): 172
  - Density: 284.3/sq mi (109.76/km^{2})
- Time zone: UTC-6 (CST)
  - Summer (DST): UTC-5 (CDT)
- ZIP code: 56521
- Area code: 218
- FIPS code: 27-09280
- GNIS feature ID: 0660007
- Website: callawaymn.gov

Callaway is a city in Becker County, Minnesota, USA, approximately 11 miles from the county seat, Detroit Lakes, Minnesota. The population was 178 at the 2020 census. Callaway is often associated with a nearby town, Richwood, Minnesota.

== Geography ==
According to the United States Census Bureau, the city has a total area of 0.64 square miles (1.66 km^{2}), all land.

== Demographics ==
Historical population
Census	Pop.	Note	%±
1910	276		—
1920	325		17.8%
1930	230		−29.2%
1940	249		8.3%
1950	193		−22.5%
1960	235		21.8%
1970	233		−0.9%
1980	238		2.1%
1990	212		−10.9%
2000	200		−5.7%
2010	234		17.0%
2020	178		−23.9%
2021 (est.)	172		−3.4%
U.S. Decennial Census; 2020 Census

=== 2010 census ===
As of the census of 2010, there were 234 people, 79 households, and 60 families living in the city. The population density was 365.6 inhabitants per square mile (141.2/km^{2}). There were 88 housing units at an average density of 137.5 per square mile (53.1/km^{2}). The racial makeup of the city was 50.9% White, 0.9% African American, 35.9% Native American, and 12.4% from two or more races. Hispanic or Latino of any race were 1.7% of the population.

There were 79 households, of which 40.5% had children under the age of 18 living with them, 49.4% were married couples living together, 20.3% had a female householder with no husband present, 6.3% had a male householder with no wife present, and 24.1% were non-families. 20.3% of all households were made up of individuals, and 6.3% had someone living alone who was 65 years of age or older. The average household size was 2.96 and the average family size was 3.28.

The median age in the city was 32 years. 32.5% of residents were under the age of 18; 10.2% were between the ages of 18 and 24; 28.2% were from 25 to 44; 21.3% were from 45 to 64; and 7.7% were 65 years of age or older. The gender makeup of the city was 48.3% male and 51.7% female.

=== 2000 census ===
As of the census of 2000, there were 200 people, 70 households, and 62 families living in the city. The population density was 316.9 inhabitants per square mile (122.4/km^{2}). There were 77 housing units at an average density of 122.0 per square mile (47.1/km^{2}). The racial makeup of the city was 61% White, 25% Native American, 1% Asian, and 13% of more than one race.

There were 70 households, out of which 50.0% had children under the age of 18 living with them, 54.3% were married couples living together, 18.6% had a female householder with no husband present, and 20.0% were non-families. 15.7% of all households were made up of individuals, and 8.6% had someone living alone who was 65 years of age or older. The average household size was 2.86 and the average family size was 3.18.

In the city, the population was spread out, with 35.0% under the age of 18, 8.5% from 18 to 24, 25.5% from 25 to 44, 19.0% from 45 to 64, and 12.0% who were 65 years of age or older. The median age was 29 years. For every 100 females, there were 96.1 males. For every 100 females age 18 and over, there were 97.0 males.

The median income for a household in the city was $33,750, and the median income for a family was $34,821. Males had a median income of $30,208 versus $21,667 for females. The per capita income for the city was $12,151. About 4.9% of families and 9.3% of the population were below the poverty line, including 8.3% of those under the age of eighteen and 33.3% of those 65 or over.

== Business ==
Callaway holds a chapel, gas stations, and several other businesses, including a post office. Callaway is the home to Native Harvest, White Earth Land Recovery Project, Honor the Earth, Niijii Radio, and Ojibwe Wind and Bio-fuels. Located in the old school Building.
