= Bejou Township, Mahnomen County, Minnesota =

Bejou Township, Minnesota
- Township
- Location of Bejou Township, within Mahnomen County, Minnesota

- Location within the state of Minnesota Bejou Township, Minnesota (the United States)
- Coordinates: 47°27′5″N 95°59′16″W
- Country: United States
- State: Minnesota
- County: Mahnomen

Area
  - Total: 37.4 sq mi (96.8 km^{2})
  - Land: 37.3 sq mi (96.7 km^{2})
  - Water: 0.039 sq mi (0.1 km^{2})
- Elevation: 1,211 ft (369 m)

Population (2020)
  - Total: 80
  - Density: 2.1/sq mi (0.83/km^{2})
- Time zone: UTC-6 (Central (CST))
  - Summer (DST): UTC-5 (CDT)
- ZIP code: 56516
- Area code: 218
- FIPS code: 27-04690
- GNIS feature ID: 0663548

Bejou Township is a township in Mahnomen County, Minnesota, United States. The population was 80 at the 2020 census.

Bejou is a corruption of bonjour, a French word meaning "hello".

== Geography ==
According to the United States Census Bureau, the township has a total area of 37.4 square miles (97 km^{2}), of which 37.3 square miles (97 km^{2}) of it is land and 0.04 square miles (0.10 km^{2}) of it (0.08%) is water.

== Demographics ==
As of the census of 2000, there were 98 people, 37 households, and 29 families residing in the township. The population density was 2.6 inhabitants per square mile (1.0/km^{2}). There were 49 housing units at an average density of 1.3 per square mile (0.50/km^{2}). The racial makeup of the township was 90.82% White, 4.08% Native American, and 5.10% from two or more races.

There were 37 households, out of which 24.3% had children under the age of 18 living with them, 70.3% were married couples living together, and 21.6% were non-families. 16.2% of all households were made up of individuals, and 2.7% had someone living alone who was 65 years of age or older. The average household size was 2.65 and the average family size was 3.00.

In the township the population was spread out, with 22.4% under the age of 18, 2.0% from 18 to 24, 26.5% from 25 to 44, 33.7% from 45 to 64, and 15.3% who were 65 years of age or older. The median age was 45 years. For every 100 females, there were 117.8 males. For every 100 females age 18 and over, there were 123.5 males.

The median income for a household in the township was $30,938, and the median income for a family was $33,125. Males had a median income of $16,250 versus $27,500 for females. The per capita income for the township was $13,082. There were 11.8% of families and 4.8% of the population living below the poverty line, including no under eighteens and 80.0% of those over 64.
