= Riverland, Minnesota =

Census-designated place in Minnesota, US

- Census-designated place
- Location within Minnesota Location within the United States
- Coordinates: 47°19′22″N 95°57′04″W
- Country: United States
- State: Minnesota
- County: Mahnomen
- Townships: Pembina, Marsh Creek

Area
  - Total: 0.22 sq mi (0.56 km^{2})
  - Land: 0.22 sq mi (0.56 km^{2})
  - Water: 0 sq mi (0.00 km^{2})
- Elevation: 1,217 ft (371 m)

Population (2020)
  - Total: 293
  - Density: 1,344.3/sq mi (519.05/km^{2})
- Time zone: UTC-6 (Central (CST))
  - Summer (DST): UTC-5 (CDT)
- ZIP Code: 56557 (Mahnomen)
- Area code: 218
- GNIS feature ID: 2583779
- FIPS code: 27-54596

Riverland is a census-designated place and unincorporated community in Pembina and Marsh Creek townships, Mahnomen County, Minnesota, United States. Its population was 293 at the 2020 census.

== Geography ==
Riverland is in western Mahnomen County and is bordered to the south by the city of Mahnomen, the county seat. The community is mostly in the northeastern part of Pembina Township, with a smaller section to the north, in the southeastern part of Marsh Creek Township. Minnesota State Highway 200, following the township boundary, crosses the Riverland CDP from east to west.

According to the U.S. Census Bureau, the CDP has an area of 0.22 square miles (0.57 km^{2}), all land. The Wild Rice River, a tributary of the Red River of the North, forms the eastern edge of the community.

== Demographics ==
Historical population
Census	Pop.	Note	%±
2010	276		—
2020	293		6.2%
U.S. Decennial Census
