= West Roy Lake, Minnesota =

Census-designated place in Minnesota, US

- Census-designated place
- Location within Minnesota Location within the United States
- Coordinates: 47°18′42″N 95°35′44″W
- Country: United States
- State: Minnesota
- County: Mahnomen
- Township: Twin Lakes

Area
  - Total: 1.61 sq mi (4.18 km^{2})
  - Land: 1.61 sq mi (4.18 km^{2})
  - Water: 0 sq mi (0.00 km^{2})
- Elevation: 1,513 ft (461 m)

Population (2020)
  - Total: 56
  - Density: 34.7/sq mi (13.39/km^{2})
- Time zone: UTC-6 (Central (CST))
  - Summer (DST): UTC-5 (CDT)
- ZIP Code: 56557 (Mahnomen)
- Area code: 218
- GNIS feature ID: 2628825
- FIPS Code: 27-69690

West Roy Lake is a census-designated place and unincorporated community in Twin Lakes Township, Mahnomen County, Minnesota, United States. Its population was 56 as of the 2020 census.

== Geography ==
West Roy Lake is in eastern Mahnomen County, in the northern part of Twin Lakes Township. It is bordered to the north by Clover Township, and the CDP extends east to touch the west shore of Roy Lake. Minnesota State Highway 200 runs along the northern edge of the CDP, following the township border, and leads west 18 miles (29 km) to Mahnomen, the county seat.

According to the U.S. Census Bureau, the West Roy Lake CDP has an area of 1.6 square miles (4.1 km^{2}), all of it land.

== Demographics ==
Historical population
Census	Pop.	Note	%±
2010	74		—
2020	56		−24.3%
U.S. Decennial Census
