= Twin Lakes Township, Mahnomen County, Minnesota =

Twin Lakes Township, Minnesota
- Township
- Location of Twin Lakes Township, within Mahnomen County, Minnesota

- Location within the state of Minnesota Twin Lakes Township, Minnesota (the United States)
- Coordinates: 47°15′52″N 95°37′49″W
- Country: United States
- State: Minnesota
- County: Mahnomen

Area
  - Total: 36.0 sq mi (93.3 km^{2})
  - Land: 32.8 sq mi (84.9 km^{2})
  - Water: 3.2 sq mi (8.4 km^{2})
- Elevation: 1,510 ft (460 m)

Population (2020)
  - Total: 727
  - Density: 22.2/sq mi (8.56/km^{2})
- Time zone: UTC-6 (Central (CST))
  - Summer (DST): UTC-5 (CDT)
- FIPS code: 27-65929
- GNIS feature ID: 0665825

Twin Lakes Township is a township in Mahnomen County, Minnesota, United States. The population was 727 at the 2020 census. It contains the census-designated places of Naytahwaush and West Roy Lake and parts of Roy Lake and Twin Lakes,

== History ==
Twin Lakes Township was named for a pair of lakes within its borders.

== Geography ==
According to the United States Census Bureau, the township has a total area of 36.0 square miles (93.3 km^{2}), of which 32.8 square miles (84.9 km^{2}) of it is land and 3.2 square miles (8.4 km^{2}) of it (8.97%) is water.

== Demographics ==
As of the census of 2000, there were 847 people, 241 households, and 185 families residing in the township. The population density was 25.8 inhabitants per square mile (10.0/km^{2}). There were 392 housing units at an average density of 12.0/sq mi (4.6/km^{2}). The racial makeup of the township was 9.92% White, 0.59% African American, 86.19% Native American, 0.24% from other races, and 3.07% from two or more races. Hispanic or Latino of any race were 1.42% of the population.

There were 241 households, out of which 50.6% had children under the age of 18 living with them, 38.6% were married couples living together, 27.8% had a female householder with no husband present, and 23.2% were non-families. 17.0% of all households were made up of individuals, and 7.9% had someone living alone who was 65 years of age or older. The average household size was 3.51 and the average family size was 3.90.

In the township the population was spread out, with 43.0% under the age of 18, 11.1% from 18 to 24, 22.9% from 25 to 44, 17.1% from 45 to 64, and 5.9% who were 65 years of age or older. The median age was 22 years. For every 100 females, there were 97.9 males. For every 100 females age 18 and over, there were 88.7 males.

The median income for a household in the township was $26,250, and the median income for a family was $26,250. Males had a median income of $25,000 versus $23,750 for females. The per capita income for the township was $8,914. About 31.8% of families and 37.1% of the population were below the poverty line, including 40.8% of those under age 18 and 15.1% of those age 65 or over.
