= Rosedale Township, Mahnomen County, Minnesota =

Rosedale Township, Minnesota
- Township
- Location of Rosedale Township, within Mahnomen County, Minnesota

- Location within the state of Minnesota Rosedale Township, Minnesota (the United States)
- Coordinates: 47°16′28″N 95°52′46″W
- Country: United States
- State: Minnesota
- County: Mahnomen

Area
  - Total: 36.3 sq mi (94.1 km^{2})
  - Land: 34.9 sq mi (90.4 km^{2})
  - Water: 1.4 sq mi (3.7 km^{2})
- Elevation: 1,250 ft (381 m)

Population (2020)
  - Total: 130
  - Density: 3.7/sq mi (1.4/km^{2})
- Time zone: UTC-6 (Central (CST))
  - Summer (DST): UTC-5 (CDT)
- FIPS code: 27-55618
- GNIS feature ID: 0665462

Rosedale Township is a township in Mahnomen County, Minnesota, United States. The population was 130 at the 2020 census.

Rosedale Township was named for the abundant wild roses within its borders.

== Geography ==
According to the United States Census Bureau, the township has a total area of 36.3 square miles (94.1 km^{2}), of which 34.9 square miles (90.4 km^{2}) of it is land and 1.4 square miles (3.7 km^{2}) of it (3.94%) is water.

== Demographics ==
As of the census of 2000, there were 136 people, 48 households, and 38 families residing in the township. The population density was 3.9 people per square mile (1.5/km^{2}). There were 52 housing units at an average density of 1.5/sq mi (0.6/km^{2}). The racial makeup of the township was 92.65% White, 0.74% Native American, 0.74% Asian, and 5.88% from two or more races.

There were 48 households, out of which 31.3% had children under the age of 18 living with them, 68.8% were married couples living together, 2.1% had a female householder with no husband present, and 20.8% were non-families. 20.8% of all households were made up of individuals, and 12.5% had someone living alone who was 65 years of age or older. The average household size was 2.83 and the average family size was 3.29.

In the township the population was spread out, with 29.4% under the age of 18, 6.6% from 18 to 24, 23.5% from 25 to 44, 17.6% from 45 to 64, and 22.8% who were 65 years of age or older. The median age was 42 years. For every 100 females, there were 109.2 males. For every 100 females age 18 and over, there were 113.3 males.

The median income for a household in the township was $36,250, and the median income for a family was $38,125. Males had a median income of $20,938 versus $15,625 for females. The per capita income for the township was $13,134. There were 10.8% of families and 15.8% of the population living below the poverty line, including 12.0% of under eighteens and 8.7% of those over 64.
