= The Ranch, Minnesota =

Census-designated place in Minnesota, US

- Census-designated place
- Location within Minnesota Location within the United States
- Coordinates: 47°19′11″N 95°41′43″W
- Country: United States
- State: Minnesota
- County: Mahnomen
- Township: La Garde

Area
  - Total: 0.31 sq mi (0.80 km^{2})
  - Land: 0.31 sq mi (0.80 km^{2})
  - Water: 0 sq mi (0.00 km^{2})
- Elevation: 1,444 ft (440 m)

Population (2020)
  - Total: 14
  - Density: 45.2/sq mi (17.46/km^{2})
- Time zone: UTC-6 (Central (CST))
  - Summer (DST): UTC-5 (CDT)
- ZIP Code: 56557 (Mahnomen)
- Area code: 218
- GNIS feature ID: 2583781
- FIPS code: 27-64547

The Ranch is a census-designated place in La Garde Township, Mahnomen County, Minnesota, United States. Its population was 14 as of the 2020 census.

== Geography ==
The Ranch is in eastern Mahnomen County, in the northeast part of La Garde Township. Its northern border is the township line with Beaulieu Township. Minnesota State Highway 200 follows the township line, leading west 13 miles (21 km) to Mahnomen, the county seat, and east 7 miles (11 km) to Roy Lake.

According to the U.S. Census Bureau, The Ranch has an area of 0.31 square miles (0.80 km^{2}), all land.

== Demographics ==
Historical population
Census	Pop.	Note	%±
2010	9		—
2020	14		55.6%
U.S. Decennial Census
