= Clover Township, Mahnomen County, Minnesota =

Clover Township, Minnesota
- Township
- Location of Clover Township, within Mahnomen County, Minnesota

- Location within the state of Minnesota Clover Township, Minnesota (the United States)
- Coordinates: 47°21′50″N 95°35′55″W
- Country: United States
- State: Minnesota
- County: Mahnomen

Area
  - Total: 35.6 sq mi (92.2 km^{2})
  - Land: 34.7 sq mi (89.9 km^{2})
  - Water: 0.89 sq mi (2.3 km^{2})
- Elevation: 1,467 ft (447 m)

Population (2020)
  - Total: 142
  - Density: 4.09/sq mi (1.58/km^{2})
- Time zone: UTC-6 (Central (CST))
  - Summer (DST): UTC-5 (CDT)
- FIPS code: 27-12250
- GNIS feature ID: 0663836

Clover Township is a township in Mahnomen County, Minnesota, United States. The population was 142 at the 2020 census.

== Geography ==
According to the United States Census Bureau, the township has a total area of 35.6 square miles (92 km^{2}), of which 34.7 square miles (90 km^{2}) of it is land and 0.9 square miles (2.3 km^{2}) of it (2.50%) is water.

== Demographics ==
As of the census of 2000, there were 123 people, 52 households, and 30 families residing in the township. The population density was 3.5 inhabitants per square mile (1.4/km^{2}). There were 57 housing units at an average density of 1.6 per square mile (0.62/km^{2}). The racial makeup of the township was 43.09% White, 46.34% Native American, 0.81% African American, and 9.76% from two or more races. No Asians, Pacific Islanders, Hispanics or Latinos live in Clover Township.

There were 52 households, out of which 26.9% had children under the age of 18 living with them, 32.7% were married couples living together, 19.2% had a female householder with no husband present, and 42.3% were non-families. 42.3% of all households were made up of individuals, and 19.2% had someone living alone who was 65 years of age or older. The average household size was 2.37 and the average family size was 3.27.

In the township the population was spread out, with 27.6% under the age of 18, 9.8% from 18 to 24, 22.8% from 25 to 44, 23.6% from 45 to 64, and 16.3% who were 65 years of age or older. The median age was 38 years. For every 100 females, there are 105 males; For every 100 females age 18 and over, there were 102.3 males.

The median income for a household in the township was $21,750, and the median income for a family was $27,500. Males had a median income of $27,188 versus $17,321 for females. The per capita income for the township was $13,523. There were 19.4% of families and 21.5% of the population living below the poverty line, including 30.2% of under eighteens and none of those over 64.
