= Midway, Mahnomen County, Minnesota =

Census-designated place in Minnesota, US

Midway, Minnesota
- Census-designated place
- Location within Minnesota Location within the United States
- Coordinates: 47°19′01″N 95°47′02″W
- Country: United States
- State: Minnesota
- County: Mahnomen
- Township: La Garde

Area
  - Total: 2.01 sq mi (5.21 km^{2})
  - Land: 1.85 sq mi (4.80 km^{2})
  - Water: 0.16 sq mi (0.41 km^{2})
- Elevation: 1,329 ft (405 m)

Population (2020)
  - Total: 20
  - Density: 10.8/sq mi (4.17/km^{2})
- Time zone: UTC-6 (Central (CST))
  - Summer (DST): UTC-5 (CDT)
- ZIP Code: 56557 (Mahnomen)
- Area code: 218
- FIPS code: 27-42010
- GNIS feature ID: 2628822

Midway is a census-designated place and unincorporated community in La Garde Township, Mahnomen County, Minnesota, United States. Its population was 20 as of the 2020 census.

== Geography ==
The township is in central Mahnomen County, in the northwest corner of La Garde Township. Minnesota State Highway 200 forms the northern border of the community. The CDP of Beaulieu borders Midway to the north, across MN 200. Mahnomen, the county seat, is 9 miles (14 km) to the west.

According to the U.S. Census Bureau, the Midway CDP has a total area of 2.01 square miles (5.21 km^{2}), of which 1.85 square miles (4.79 km^{2}) are land and 0.16 square miles (0.41 km^{2}), or 7.91%, are water. Perch Lake is in the northeast part of the community.

== Education ==
The community is served by Mahnomen ISD 432.

== Demographics ==
Historical population
Census	Pop.	Note	%±
2010	26		—
2020	20		−23.1%
U.S. Decennial Census
