= White Earth River (Minnesota) =

Coordinates: 47.31246°N 95.94865°W

- Native name: Gaa-waabaabiganikaag-ziibi (Ojibwe)

Location
- Country: United States

Physical characteristics
- Source
  - location: Minnesota

The White Earth River is a 26.2-mile-long (42.2 km) tributary of the Wild Rice River of northwestern Minnesota in the United States. Via the Wild Rice River, the Red River of the North, Lake Winnipeg, and the Nelson River, it is part of the Hudson Bay watershed. It rises at the outlet of White Earth Lake and flows northwest through Mahnomen County, joining the Wild Rice River just east of the city of Mahnomen.

== See also ==
- List of rivers of Minnesota
