= Roy Lake, Minnesota =

Census-designated place in Minnesota, US

Roy Lake, Minnesota Gaa-giishkajiwegamaag (Ojibwe)
- Census-designated place
- Location within Minnesota Location within the United States
- Coordinates: 47°19′04″N 95°32′34″W
- Country: United States
- State: Minnesota
- Counties: Clearwater, Mahnomen
- Townships: La Prairie, Twin Lakes

Area
  - Total: 0.73 sq mi (1.88 km^{2})
  - Land: 0.45 sq mi (1.16 km^{2})
  - Water: 0.28 sq mi (0.72 km^{2})
- Elevation: 1,490 ft (450 m)

Population (2020)
  - Total: 30
  - Density: 66.8/sq mi (25.81/km^{2})
- Time zone: UTC-6 (Central (CST))
  - Summer (DST): UTC-5 (CDT)
- ZIP Code: 56557 (Mahnomen)
- Area code: 218
- GNIS feature ID: 2583780
- FIPS Code: 27-56212

Roy Lake (Ojibwe: Gaa-giishkajiwegamaag) is a census-designated place and unincorporated community in Clearwater and Mahnomen counties, Minnesota, United States. Its population was 30 as of the 2020 census, up from 12 in 2010.

== Geography ==
The community is mainly in western Clearwater County, in La Prairie Township, but extends west into Mahnomen County, where a small portion is in the northeast corner of Twin Lakes Township. The community sits on the northeast side of Roy Lake, a natural lake with its outlet at the westernmost point of the community. Minnesota State Highway 200 forms the northern edge of the community; the highway leads west 20 miles (32 km) to Mahnomen and east 8 miles (13 km) to Zerkel.

According to the U.S. Census Bureau, the Roy Lake CDP has a total area of 0.73 square miles (1.89 km^{2}), of which 0.45 square miles (1.17 km^{2}) are land and 0.28 square miles (0.73 km^{2}), or 38.2%, are water, comprising the northeast part of Roy Lake. Via the lake's outlet, the community is within the watershed of the Wild Rice River, flowing west toward the Red River of the North.

== Demographics ==
Historical population
Census	Pop.	Note	%±
2010	12		—
2020	30		150.0%
U.S. Decennial Census
