= Naytahwaush, Minnesota =

Census-designated place in Minnesota, US

Naytahwaush, Minnesota Netaawaash (Ojibwe)
- Census-designated place
- Location within Minnesota Location within the United States
- Coordinates: 47°16′14″N 95°37′39″W
- Country: United States
- State: Minnesota
- County: Mahnomen
- Township: Twin Lakes

Area
  - Total: 3.28 sq mi (8.49 km^{2})
  - Land: 2.90 sq mi (7.52 km^{2})
  - Water: 0.37 sq mi (0.97 km^{2})
- Elevation: 1,486 ft (453 m)

Population (2020)
  - Total: 504
  - Density: 173.5/sq mi (66.99/km^{2})
- Time zone: UTC-6 (Central (CST))
  - Summer (DST): UTC-5 (CDT)
- ZIP code: 56566
- Area code: 218
- FIPS code: 27-45052
- GNIS feature ID: 2393144

Naytahwaush (/ˈneɪtəwɔːʃ/ NAY-tə-wawsh, Ojibwe: Netaawaash) is a census-designated place (CDP) in Mahnomen County, Minnesota, United States. The population was 504 at the 2020 census.

== Geography ==
Naytahwaush is in eastern Mahnomen County, in central Twin Lakes Township. It is on the northern side of North Twin Lake. It is 20 miles (32 km) by road east-southeast of Mahnomen, the county seat, and 4 miles (6 km) south of Minnesota State Highway 200.

According to the U.S. Census Bureau, the CDP has an area of 3.3 square miles (8.5 km^{2}), of which 2.9 square miles (7.5 km^{2}) are land and 0.4 square miles (1.0 km^{2}), or 11.41%, are water. Part of North Twin Lake is included in the CDP. Via the lake outlet, the community is within the watershed of the Wild Rice River, leading west to the Red River of the North.

== Demographics ==
Historical population
Census	Pop.	Note	%±
2000	583		—
2010	578		−0.9%
2020	504		−12.8%
U.S. Decennial Census

As of the census of 2000, there were 583 people, 166 households, and 124 families residing in the CDP. The population density was 30.0 inhabitants per square mile (11.6/km^{2}). There were 173 housing units at an average density of 8.9/sq mi (3.4/km^{2}). The racial makeup of the CDP was 5.15% White, 0.86% African American, 91.25% Native American, 0.34% from other races, and 2.40% from two or more races. Hispanic or Latino of any race were 1.89% of the population.

There were 166 households, out of which 52.4% had children under the age of 18 living with them, 31.3% were married couples living together, 34.3% had a female householder with no husband present, and 24.7% were non-families. 18.1% of all households were made up of individuals, and 9.0% had someone living alone who was 65 years of age or older. The average household size was 3.51 and the average family size was 3.94.

In the CDP, the population was spread out, with 42.9% under the age of 18, 13.2% from 18 to 24, 21.8% from 25 to 44, 16.8% from 45 to 64, and 5.3% who were 65 years of age or older. The median age was 21 years. For every 100 females, there were 97.6 males. For every 100 females age 18 and over, there were 85.0 males.

The median income for a household in the CDP was $26,429, and the median income for a family was $25,313. Males had a median income of $24,643 versus $26,354 for females. The per capita income for the CDP was $8,296. About 34.5% of families and 37.1% of the population were below the poverty line, including 37.6% of those under age 18 and 23.3% of those age 65 or over.
