= Caroline (given name) =

- Gender: Feminine

Origin
- Origin: French

Other names
- Related names: Carolyn, Carol, Carolina, Charlotte

Caroline is a feminine given name, originally a French feminine form of the masculine name Charles. It has been in common use in the Anglosphere since the 1600s. The name was first used among upper class English families in honor of Charles I of England and his son Charles II of England. Common nicknames and variations include Callie, Cara, Carol, Carole, Carolina, Carolyn, Carly, Carrie, and Caz.

== Usage ==
Caroline was well-used in France throughout the 20th century and the early 21st century. It was among the top 100 names for French girls between 1900 and 1907 and again from 1958 to 2002. It has since declined in use in French-speaking countries. In Belgium, Caroline was also among the top 100 names for girls in the 1990s and early 2000s.

In Scotland, Caroline was among the top 100 names for Scottish girls between 1935 and 1993, and was most popular from the 1950s to the 1970s. In England and Wales, the name was among the 100 most popular names for girls in the early 20th century and again between 1944 and 1984. It was most popular between 1964 and 1974, when it was among the top 20 names for British girls. It was also among the top 100 names for girls in Ireland between 1964 and 1997, and was a top 10 name for Irish girls between 1973 and 1980.

In New Zealand, the name was among the 100 most popular names for girls between 1957 and 1985. It was similarly popular in Australia, where it was a top 100 name for girls from the late 1950s through the early 1980s.

Caroline has been among the 1,000 most popular given names for girls in the United States since 1880. Its greatest popularity was between 1880 and 1893, when it was among the 100 most popular names for American girls. It then declined in use, but rose again in popularity beginning in the late 1950s and early 1960s. The increase in usage during this timeframe coincided with the 1957 birth of Princess Caroline of Monaco, daughter of the American film star Grace Kelly, and the 1957 birth of Caroline Kennedy, who was much photographed from 1961 to 1963 during the presidential administration of her father, American president John F. Kennedy. The name has been among the 100 most popular names for American girls since 1994. In Canada, the name was among the 100 most popular names for girls during the 1960s and again in the late 1970s and early 1980s. In French-speaking Quebec, Canada, Caroline was among the 100 most popular names for French-Canadian girls between 1980 and 2000, and was a top 10 name between 1980 and 1986.

In Norway, Caroline was among the top 100 names for girls from the early 1980s through 2010. In Denmark, Caroline was among the 50 most popular names for girls between the early 1990s and 2018, and was a top 10 name between 1997 and 2010. It was among the top 100 names for girls in Sweden in the late 1990s and early 2000s.

In Brazil, Caroline was among the top 100 names between 1980 and 2000.

== Academics and science ==
- Caroline Bassett, British media theorist, cultural critic, and feminist scholar
- Caroline Bedell Thomas (1904–1997), American cardiologist
- Caroline Bell, professor of psychological medicine in New Zealand
- Caroline Bowen (born 1944), New Zealand speech pathologist
- Caroline Brettell (born 1950), Canadian cultural anthropologist
- Caroline Brown Bourland (1871–1956), American professor
- Caroline Bruzelius, American art historian
- Caroline Matilda Dodson (1845–1898), American physician
- Caroline Finch, Australian statistician
- Caroline Furness Jayne (1873–1909), American ethnologist
- Caroline Breese Hall (1939–2012), American pediatrician
- Caroline Herschel (1750–1848), German astronomer
- Caroline Herzenberg (born 1932), American physicist
- Caroline Pellew (1882–1963), British geneticist
- Caroline Hilary Barratt-Pugh (born 1954), Australian scholar
- Caroline Langat Thoruwa, Kenyan chemist
- Caroline Uhler (born 1983), Swiss statistician

== Activism ==
- Caroline Amblard (1872–1939), French dramatist and trade unionist
- Caroline Archer (1922–1978), Aboriginal Australian activist and telephonist
- Caroline Brown Buell (1843–1927), American activist
- Caroline Chisholm (1808–1877), Australian social reformer
- Caroline M. Clark Woodward (1840–1924), American activist and writer
- Caroline Criado Perez (born 1984), Brazilian–English feminist author, activist and journalist
- Caroline Dayer (born 1978), Swiss feminist educator and writer
- Caroline LeCount (c. 1846–1923), American educator and civil rights activist
- Caroline Lowder Downing, British suffragette, sister of Edith Downing
- Caroline Healey Dall (1822–1912), American feminist writer, transcendentalist, and reformer
- Caroline Killeen (1926–2014), American activist
- Caroline Marmon Fesler (1878–1960), American philanthropist and patron of art and music
- Caroline Moorehead (born 1944), English human rights journalist and biographer
- Caroline Mwatha (died 2019), Kenyan human rights activist
- Caroline Helen Jemison Plane (1829–1925), American white supremacist
- Caroline Severance (1820–1914), American abolitionist, suffragist, and the founder of women's clubs

== Aristocracy ==
=== Empresses consort ===
- Caroline Augusta of Bavaria (1792–1873), Empress of Austria by marriage to Francis I of Austria

=== Queens consort ===
- Caroline of Ansbach (1683–1737), British queen consort of King George II
- Caroline Amalie of Augustenburg (1796–1881), Danish queen consort of King Christian VIII
- Caroline of Baden (1776–1841), first Queen consort of Bavaria by marriage to Maximilian I Joseph of Bavaria
- Caroline Bonaparte (1782–1839), queen consort of Joachim, King of Naples
- Caroline of Brunswick (1768–1821), queen consort of George IV of the United Kingdom
- Caroline Matilda of Great Britain (1751–1775), British monarch, sister of King George III and Queen of Denmark and Norway by marriage to King Christian VII

=== Princesses ===
- Princess Caroline of Great Britain (1713–1757), Hannover princess, daughter of King George II of Great Britain and Caroline of Ansbach
- Princess Caroline of Monaco (born 1957), formerly heir presumptive to the throne of Monaco, daughter of Grace Kelly
- Princess Caroline of Hesse-Darmstadt (1746–1821)
- Princess Caroline Louise of Hesse-Darmstadt (1723–1783), consort of Baden, artist, collector, salonist and scientist
- Landgravine Caroline of Hesse-Rotenburg (1714–1741), Princess of Condé by marriage to Louis Henri, Duke of Bourbon
- Princess Caroline of Nassau-Usingen (1762–1823), daughter of Karl Wilhelm, Prince of Nassau-Usingen, and wife of Landgrave Frederick of Hesse-Kassel
- Princess Caroline Louise of Saxe-Weimar-Eisenach (1786–1816), princess of Mecklenburg-Schwerin
- Princess Caroline-Mathilde of Denmark (1912–1995), Danish monarch

=== Other aristocrats ===
- Countess Caroline Felizitas of Leiningen-Dagsburg (1734–1810), German countess
- Caroline, Countess of Cranbrook (born 1935), English aristocrat and food activist
- Countess Caroline of Nassau-Saarbrücken (1704–1774), Countess Palatine of Zweibrücken by marriage to Christian III of Zweibrücken
- Countess Palatine Caroline of Zweibrücken (1721–1774), Landgravine of Hesse-Darmstadt by marriage to Louis IX, Landgrave of Hesse-Darmstadt
- Caroline Lacroix (1883–1948), mistress of Leopold II of Belgium
- Carolyne zu Sayn-Wittgenstein (1819–1887), Polish noblewoman associated with Franz Liszt

== Arts ==
- Caroline Aaron (born 1952), American actress
- Caroline Abraham (1809–1877), New Zealand artist
- Caroline Adderson (born 1963), Canadian novelist and short story writer
- Caroline Aherne (1963–2016), British comedian, actress and writer
- Caroline Ailin (born 1989), Norwegian singer and songwriter
- Caroline Amiguet (born 1977), French actress and model
- Caroline Armington (1875–1939), Canadian painter
- Caroline Bardua (1781–1864), German painter
- Caroline Baron, American film producer and philanthropist
- Caroline Becker (1826–1881), Finnish photographer
- Caroline Beil (born 1966), German actress and television presenter
- Caroline Bergvall (born 1962) German–born French–Norwegian poet
- Caroline Birley (1851–1907), English geologist, fossil collector and children's author
- Lady Caroline Blackwood (1931–1996), English writer
- Caroline Bliss (born 1961), English actress
- Caroline Brazier, Australian actress
- Caroline Brothers, Australian writer
- Caroline Burke (1913–1964), American actress, art collector, writer, and television and theater producer
- Caroline Caddy (born 1944), Australian poet
- Caroline Carleton (1811–1874), English–born Australian poet
- Caroline Catz, English film, television, narrator, theatre and radio actress
- Caroline Champetier (born 1954), French cinematographer
- Caroline Chariot-Dayez (born 1958), Belgian painter
- Caroline Charrière (1825–1873), Swiss composer and conductor
- Caroline Chesebro (1825–1873), American writer
- Caroline Chevin (born 1974), Swiss soul singer
- Caroline Chikezie (born 1974), Nigerian–English actress
- Caroline Chomienne (1957–2020), French film director
- Caroline Clive (1801–1873), English writer
- Caroline B. Cooney (born 1947), American author
- Caroline Corinth (born 20 July 1994), Danish model
- Caroline Corr (born 1973), Irish drummer
- Caroline Craig (born 1975), Australian actress
- Caroline Crawford (born 1949), American actress and singer
- Caroline Crawley (1963–2016), English singer
- Caroline D'Amore (born 1984), American model and actress
- Caroline Demmer (1845–1898), German–Austrian actress and singer
- Caroline Dhavernas (born 1978), Canadian actress
- Caroline Dowdeswell (born 1945), English actress
- Caroline Ducey (born 1976), French actress
- Caroline Dumas (born 1935), French soprano
- Caroline Duprez (1832–1875), French soprano
- Caroline Alice Elgar (1848–1920), English writer and poet
- Caroline Bucknall-Estcourt (1809–1886), British Artist
- Caroline Leigh Gascoigne (1813–1883), British poet and writer
- Caroline Goldsmith (1925–2004) American arts promoter
- Caroline Gordon (1895–1981), American novelist and literary critic
- Caroline Hardaker (born 1986), English poet and novelist
- Caroline Howard Gilman (1794–1888), American writer
- Caroline Howard Jervey (1823–1877), American author and poet
- Caroline Dana Howe (1824–1907), American poet and writer
- Caroline van der Hucht-Kerkhoven (1840–1915), Dutch writer and activist
- Caroline Innerbichler, American stage actress
- Caroline John (1940–2012), British actress
- Caroline Alice Lejeune (1897–1973), British writer
- Caroline Lufkin (born 1981), Okinawan-American musician
- Caroline Marbouty (1803–1890), French writer
- Caroline Marshall Woodward (1828–1890), American author
- Caroline May (1820–1895), English-American poet and editor
- Caroline Mezger (1787–1843), Swiss painter, printmaker, and teacher
- Caroline Millard (died 1894), Anglo-Irish wood engraver
- Caroline Miner Smith, known as Siiickbrain, American singer and model
- Caroline Munro (born 1949) British actress, singer and model
- Caroline Myss (born 1952), American self-help, spirituality and mysticism author
- Caroline Néron (born 1973), Canadian actress
- Caroline Polachek (born 1985), American musician
- Caroline Quentin (born 1960), British actress and television presenter
- Caroline Rannersberger (born 1961), Australian visual artist
- Caroline Keating Reed (died 1954), American pianist and music teacher
- Caroline Rhea (born 1964), Canadian actress
- Caroline Ridderstolpe (1793–1878), Swedish composer
- Caroline M. Sawyer (1812–1894), American poet, biographer and editor
- Caroline Shaw (born 1982), American Pulitzer Prize-winning composer
- Caroline Shawk Brooks (1840–1913), American sculptor
- Caroline Henrietta Sheridan (1770–1851), English novelist
- Caroline Anne Southey (1786–1854), English poet
- Caroline Townshend (1878–1944), British stained glass artist of the Arts and Crafts Movement
- Caroline Valpy (1804–1884), a British-New Zealand artist
- Caroline von Wolzogen (1763–1847), German novelist and biographer
- Caroline Weldon (1844–1921), Swiss-American artist and activist with the National Indian Defense

== Law and politics ==
- Caroline Abadie (born 1976), French politician
- Caroline Agyao, Filipino politician
- Caroline Ansell (born 1971), British politician
- Caroline Casagrande (born 1976), American government official
- Caroline A. Crenshaw, American attorney
- Caroline Desbiens, Canadian politician
- Caroline Desrochers, Canadian politician
- Caroline Dinenage (born 1971), British politician
- Caroline Fiat (born 1977), French politician
- Caroline Flint (born 1961), British politician
- Caroline Ganley (1879–1966), British politician
- Caroline Love Goodwin O'Day (1869–1943), American congresswoman
- Caroline Ludlow (1947–2014), British judge
- Caroline Johnson (born 1977), British politician
- Caroline Lucas (born 1960), British politician
- Caroline Nokes (born 1972), British politician
- Caroline Schmidt (born 1960), Swedish politician
- Caroline Spelman (born 1958), British politician
- Caroline St-Hilaire (born 1969), Canadian politician from Quebec
- Caroline Szyber (born 1981), Swedish politician
- Caroline Täljeblad (born 1986), Swedish politician
- Caroline Van Zile, American lawyer and politician
- Caroline Voaden (born 1968), British politician

== Sports ==
- Caroline Abbé (born 1988), Swiss footballer
- Caroline Allen (born 1992), American motorcycle racer
- Caroline Arft (born 1996), German canoeist
- Caroline Atkins (born 1981), English cricket coach and former player
- Caroline Barrs (born 1964), English former cricketer who played as an all-rounder
- Caroline Buchanan (born 1990), Australian cyclist
- Caroline Burckle (born 1986), American swimmer
- Caroline Chepkurui (born 1990), Kenyan steeplechase runner
- Caroline Chepkwony (born 1985), Kenyan long distance runner
- Caroline Chew (equestrian) (born 1992), Singaporean equestrian athlete and solicitor
- Caroline Clark (born 1990), American female water polo player
- Caroline Cruveillier (born 1998), French boxer
- Caroline Curren (born 1962), Australian judoka
- Caroline Delas (born 1980), French rower
- Caroline Dhenin (born 1973), French tennis player
- Caroline Dolehide (born 1998), American tennis player
- Caroline Ducharme (born 2002), American basketball player
- Caroline Foot (born 1965), British butterfly swimmer
- Caroline Fritze (born 2000), German judoka
- Caroline Green (born 2003), American ice dancer
- Caroline Hedwall (born 1989), Swedish professional golfer
- Caroline Heron (born 1990), Scottish footballer
- Caroline Knop (born 1996), volleyball player
- Caroline Lalive (born 1979), American former alpine skier
- Caroline Masson (born 1989), German professional golfer
- Caroline Moreau (born 2010), American gymnast
- Caroline Nyaga (born 1993), Kenyan long-distance runner
- Caroline Powell (equestrian) (born 1973), New Zealand equestrian
- Caroline Seger (born 1985), Swedish footballer
- Caroline Stoll (born 1960), American tennis player
- Caroline Vis (born 1970), Dutch tennis player
- Caroline Weir (born 1995), Scottish footballer
- Caroline Wensink (born 1984), Dutch volleyball player
- Caroline Wittrin (born 1968), Canadian hammer thrower
- Caroline Wozniacki (born 1990), Danish tennis player
- Caroline Zhang (born 1993), American figure skater

== Others ==
- Caroline Anthonypillai (1908–2009), Sri Lankan trade unionist and founder of the Lanka Sama Samaja Party
- Caroline Arnott (1859–1933), English philanthropist
- Caroline Starr Balestier Kipling (1862–1939), wife of writer Rudyard Kipling
- Caroline Bancroft (1900–1985), American journalist and Ziegfeld Folly
- Caroline Bartlett Crane (1858–1935), American Unitarian minister, suffragist, educator, journalist, and sanitation reformer
- Caroline Bittencourt (1981–2019), Brazilian model and television presenter
- Caroline Blake (1835–1919), Irish hotelier and landlord
- Caroline G. Boughton (1854–1905), American educator and social activist
- Caroline Lee Bouvier, birth name of Lee Radziwill (1933–2019), American socialite and interior designer, and younger sister of Jacqueline Kennedy Onassis
- Caroline Brady (1905–1980), American philologist
- Caroline Brasch Nielsen (born 1993), Danish fashion model
- Caroline Burghardt (1834–1922, Civil War nurse
- Caroline Butler (1976), English social media personality
- Caroline Byrne (1970–1995), Australian model
- Caroline Calloway (born 1991), American internet personality
- Caroline Cameron (born 1990), Canadian television sportscaster
- Caroline Crouch (2001–2021), Greek murder victim
- Caroline Donald, British journalist and author
- Caroline Ernst (1819–1902), American settler
- Caroline Flack (1979–2020), English television presenter
- Caroline Freeman (1856–1914), English educator and first woman to graduate from the University of Otago
- Caroline Garcia (born 1993), Dhenin's French compatriot and tennis player
- Caroline Girvan (born 1984), Irish fitness trainer and YouTuber
- Caroline Gooding (1959–2014), British solicitor and disability rights activist
- Caroline Grills (c. 1888 – 1960), Australian serial killer
- Caroline Harrison (1832–1892), American first wife to the 23rd President of the United States Benjamin Harrison and founder of the National Society of the Daughters of the American Revolution
- Caroline Haslett (1895–1957), English electrical engineer, electricity industry administrator and champion of women's rights
- Caroline Hazard (1856–1945), American educator, philanthropist, and author
- Caroline Jones (born 1968), English fundraiser
- Caroline Kennedy (born 1957), American author and attorney, the daughter and only surviving child of U.S. President John F. Kennedy
- Caroline Leonetti Ahmanson (1918–2005), American fashion consultant, businesswoman and philanthropist
- Caroline McCormick, British British cultural sector leader and consultant
- Caroline Mary Luard (1850–1908), British murder victim
- Caroline Marland (b. 1946), British businesswoman and newspaper director
- Caroline Nichols Churchill (1833–1926), American newspaper editor, suffragist and writer
- Caroline Norton (1808–1877), English writer and social reformer
- Caroline Schutz O'Fallon (1804–1898), American benefactor and philanthropist
- Caroline Schelling (1763–1809), German intellectual and writer
- Caroline Schermerhorn Astor (1830–1908), American socialite
- Caroline Skeel (1872–1951), British historian
- Caroline Spencer (1861–1928), American physician and suffragist
- Caroline Sunshine (born 1995), American actress, singer, and civil servant
- Caroline Trentini (born 1987), Brazilian fashion model
- Caroline Winberg (born 1985), Swedish model
- Caroline Wong, American cybersecurity executive

== Fictional characters ==
- Caroline Alessi, former character on the Australian soap opera Neighbours
- Caroline Beaufort, the mother of scientist Victor Frankenstein in Mary Shelley's novel Frankenstein
- Caroline Bingley, from Jane Austen's Pride and Prejudice
- Caroline Brady, on the American soap opera Days of our Lives
- Carrie Brady Reed or Caroline Anna Brady-Reed, character on the American soap opera Days of our Lives
- Cara Castillo or Carolyn Castllio, character on the American soap opera All My Children
- Carly Benson Corinthos-Jacks or Caroline Leigh Benson Corinthos-Jacks, character on the American soap opera General Hospital
- Caroline Forbes, one of the protagonists on the TV series The Vampire Diaries
- Coraline Jones, the protagonist of the novel Coraline (sometimes miscalled Caroline)
- Caroline Spencer, current character on the American CBS soap opera The Bold and the Beautiful
- Caroline Spencer Forrester, former character on the American CBS soap opera The Bold and the Beautiful

== See also ==
- Caro (given name)
- Carolina (name)
- Coraline (given name)
- Carolyne, given name
- Karoline, given name
- Karolina (given name)
