= Donald (surname) =

Donald has also been used as a surname. It can be written in Scottish Gaelic as MacDhòmhnaill.

== List of persons with the surname ==
- Aaron Donald (born 1991), American NFL football player
- Alan Donald (1931–2018), British diplomat
- Alec Donald (1900–1952), Scottish footballer
- Allan Donald (born 1966), South African cricketer
- Angus Donald (born 1965), English author
- Bobby Donald (1894–1962), Australian rules footballer with St Kilda and Essendon in the VFL.
- Caroline Donald, British journalist and author
- David Donald (cricketer) (1933–2016), New Zealand cricketer
- Elizabeth Donald (born 1975), American author/journalist
- Elizabeth Donald (painter) (1858–1940), British/New Zealand painter
- Graeme Donald (born 1974), Scottish footballer
- Howard Donald (born 1968), British singer
- Hugh Paterson Donald (1908–1989), New Zealand-born, British geneticist and researcher on animal breeding
- James Donald (1917–1993), Scottish actor
- Jim Donald (rugby union) (1898–1981), New Zealand rugby player
- Kenneth William Donald (1911–1994), British physician
- Kriss Donald (1988–2004), Scottish murder victim
- Larry Donald (born 1967), American professional heavyweight boxer
- Luke Donald (born 1977), English golfer
- Merlin Donald (born 1939), Canadian psychologist and cognitive neuroscientist
- Mitchell Donald (born 1988), Surinamese footballer
- Robert Henderson Donald (1821–1890), Confederate soldier and Texas state representative
- Rod Donald (1957–2005), New Zealand politician
- Scott Donald (born 1980), Australian professional rugby league footballer
- Stephen Donald (born 1983), New Zealand rugby union player
- Wally Donald (1927–2003), Australian rules footballer
- Warren Donald (born 1964), English-born footballer who played for Northampton Town and Colchester Utd

== See also ==
- Donalds (surname)
