= Girvan (surname) =

Girvan is a surname. Notable people with the surname include:

- Caroline Girvan (born 1984), fitness trainer and YouTuber
- Hector Girvan (1899–1969), Scottish footballer
- Michelle Girvan (born 1977), American physicist and network scientist
- Paul Girvan (born 1963), Northern Irish politician
- Richard Girvan (born 1973), New Zealand international lawn bowler

== See also ==
- Girvan, a settlement in Scotland
