= H. A. Morton Whitby =

British cancer researcher and urologist (1898–1969)

- Morton and his wife Marie
- Born: 24 September 1898; Colchester
- Died: 1969 (aged 70–71); London
- Occupation: Urologist

Henry Augustus Morton Whitby (24 September 1898 – 1969) was a British cancer researcher, surgeon and urologist. He was best known for inventing an electrical machine that he claimed could detect cancer. He based his machine on Francis Cutler Ellis's Micro-Dynameter. However, medical experts dismissed his device as quackery.

== Biography ==
Whitby was born in Colchester. He was the son of physician Henry D'arcy Whitby and Edith Festing. He was educated at St. Bartholomew's Hospital Medical College and qualified M.R.C.S. and L.R.C.P. in 1924. Whitby was surgical registrar at London Lock Hospital and chief urological assistant at West London Hospital. He also worked as a cancer researcher and surgeon at Stanger Hospital, KwaZulu-Natal. He was a Consulting surgeon to St. Margaret's Clinic for Tumours, London and consulting urologist to St. Mary's Hospital, KwaZulu-Natal (1945–1969).

During World War I and World War II he held medical posts including surgeon lieutenant commander of the British Navy and was an assistant colonial surgeon in the Falkland Islands. He was a fellow of the Royal Society of Medicine and a member of the British Association of Urological Surgeons and British Medical Association.

In 1949, Whitby was charged with improper conduct with excessive fees to four of his patients in Durban, South Africa. Whitby had also worked with his wife Marie who was giving treatment but was not a registered medical practitioner. Whitby was found guilty on several counts of attempting to recover excessive fees from his patients. The other counts were discharged but he was cautioned and reprimanded.

He married Marie Augusta Krauss on July 19, 1954. Krauss was known for smuggling allied airman out of German-occupied Europe during World War II. She died in 1993.

== Cancer research ==
Whitby was an alternative cancer treatment advocate. In 1959, he founded the Cancer Prevention Detection Centre in London and was its director (1959–1969).

Whitby invented an electrical machine that he argued could detect cancer. His device was inspired by the Ellis Micro-Dynameter of Francis Cutler Ellis (1890–1957), an engineer from Chicago. The device worked by attaching electrodes on the skin with the galvanometer measuring the "dynamic current", "potential energy", "acid/alkaline balance" and "skin current" of the human body. Whitby argued the machine could detect many other diseases. Caroline Bedell Thomas criticized Whitby "for offering hardly a vestige of experimental proof".

In 1961, Whitby sent out newspaper advertisements for his Centre and had collected donations from the general public to fund research for the centre. His Centre was alleged to have had 650 volunteers for biochemical and electronic investigations. He was accused of promoting his own professional advantage for financial benefit. In 1963, his name was erased from the Medical Register for infamous conduct. In 1964, Whitby appealed against the erasure. In 1966 his name was restored to the Medical Register.

Whitby's claims about his electrical machine detecting cancer were rejected by the medical community due to lack of evidence. The Medical Research Council, Chester Beatty Research Institute and the Marie Curie Foundation refused to support his Centre. Medical journals such as The British Medical Journal and The Lancet refused to publish articles about his machine.

In the United States, Whitby's books were advertised and sold with the Ellis Micro-Dynameter with false health claims of the machine detecting 55 diseases. The FDA concluded that the device was quackery. In 1961, the FDA obtained an injunction banning the distribution of such machines.

== Selected publications ==
- Theory of Life, Disease and Death (1945)
- Investigations of Disease (1951)
- When Body Controls Mind (1952)
- A Surgeon's Adventures (1959)
- Courage Her Passport (1963)
- Cancer: Its Prevention and Early Detection (1964)
- Preservation Of Health (1967)
- Bio-electronic Detection of Cancer and Other Diseases (1967)
