= Bourland =

Bourland is a surname. Notable people with the surname include:

- Caroline Brown Bourland (1871–1956), American college professor
- Cliff Bourland (1921–2018), American sprinter in the 1948 Summer Olympics
- Elizabeth Bourland (born 1963), sport shooter
- James G. Bourland (1801–1979), American politician
- Roger Bourland (born 1952), American music composer and professor at UCLA
- William H. Bourland (1811–1860), American politician
