= Donalds (surname) =

Donalds is a surname. Notable people with the name include:

- Andru Donalds (born 1974), Jamaican musician
- Byron Donalds (born 1978), American politician
- Ed Donalds (1883–1950), American professional baseball pitcher
- Erika Donalds (née Lees; born 1980), American conservative activist; wife of Byron
- Luchy Donalds (born 1995), Nigerian actress
- El Chombo (real name Rodney Sebastián Clark Donalds; born 1969), Panamanian reggaeton record producer

== See also ==
- Donalds (disambiguation)
- Donald (surname)
