= James Bucknall Bucknall Estcourt =

British military officer and politician (1803–1855)

Major-General James Bucknall Bucknall Estcourt
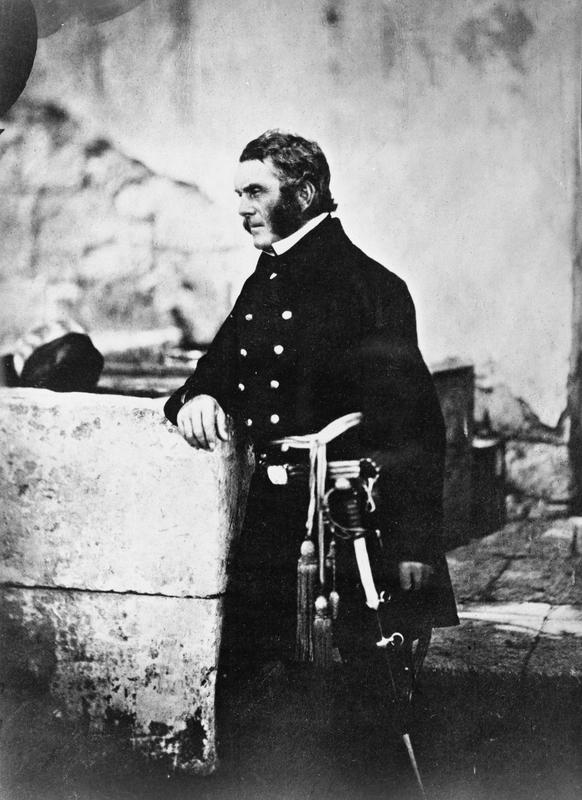
- Portrait photograph by Roger Fenton
- Born: 12 July 1802
- Died: 24 June 1855 (aged 52); Crimea, Russia

James Bucknall Bucknall Estcourt (12 July 1802 – 24 June 1855) was a British Army officer and politician.

== Early life ==
Estcourt was born in 1802, the son of Thomas Grimston Estcourt and Eleanor Sutton, and the younger brother of Thomas Henry Sutton Sotheron Estcourt. He was educated at Harrow School, and entered the army as an ensign in the 44th regiment on 13 July 1820.

== Military career ==
On 7 June 1821, he was transferred to the 43rd Monmouthshire light infantry, in which he was promoted lieutenant on 9 December 1824, and captain on 4 November 1825. He spent the next five years of his military life in Gibraltar. He returned to England and then Ireland. In 1834 he accepted the post of second in command to Colonel F. R. Chesney in the famous Euphrates Valley Expedition, and was placed in charge of the magnetic experiments. He showed himself a loyal assistant to his chief during the next two years of arduous labour and travel, and it was chiefly owing to Chesney's advocacy of his services that Estcourt was promoted major on 21 October 1836, and lieutenant-colonel by brevet on 29 March 1839. His regiment participated in the suppression of the Lower Canada Rebellion, and he was based eventually in Drummondville, Upper Canada, where, in addition to other activities as surveyor, he brought the attention of his superiors to the poor condition of the Cayuga Road.

== Treaty of Webster Ashburton ==
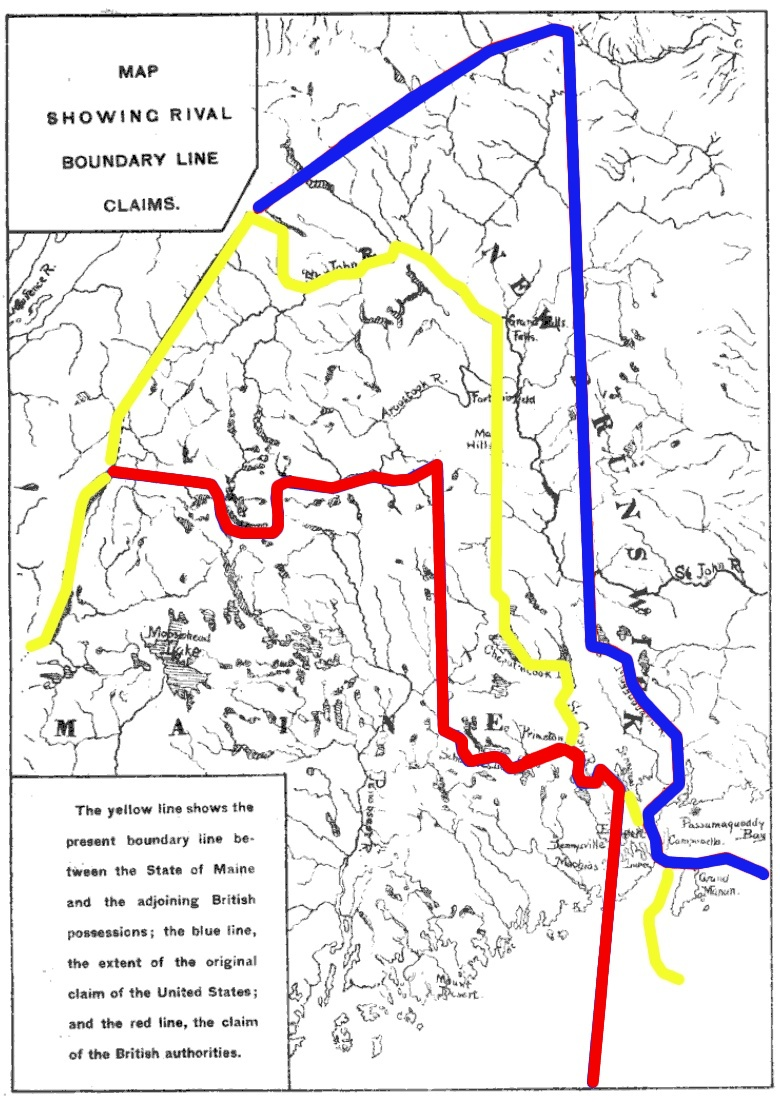
Maine boundary dispute that led to the 1842 Webster-Ashburton Treaty.

In 1837, he married Caroline, daughter of Reginald Pole-Carew, for many years Under-Secretary of State for the Home Department.

On 31 March 1842, the foreign secretary, the Earl of Aberdeen, appointed him British boundary commissioner in fulfilment of article 6 of the Webster–Ashburton Treaty, which then determined the international border with the British North American colonies of New Brunswick and Lower Canada. Estcourt's instructions enjoined him not only to demarcate the line but also to examine the possibilities of defending it. He landed in Boston on 19 April 1843. The same day he met with the American boundary commissioner, Albert Smith. On 25 August 1843, he went on half-pay, on being promoted to an unattached lieutenant-colonelcy. By the end of the 1843 season, most of the collaboration on the north line, from the source of the St. Croix River to the Saint John River, as well as the settling of the Saint John River boundaries, had been completed. In response to a request from him so that he might hasten progress the following year (1844), Aberdeen dispatched an additional 14 sappers from London; that year Estcourt would employ 500 foremen and axe-men.

== Politics ==
In February 1848, he entered parliament as M.P. for Devizes, the family borough, but did not seek re-election in 1852. He served as a Conservative. Estcourt applied for a staff appointment in the Crimean expedition. Although he had had no experience of actual warfare, he had recently completed the demarcation of the southern border of New Brunswick, a task that had seen him direct in a harsh environment over 500 men.

On 21 February 1854, he was made a brigadier-general, and appointed adjutant-general to the expeditionary force. He owed this important post to the support given to his application by his friend Lord Raglan, who believed that his polished and gentle manners concealed real strength of character. As adjutant-general he performed his duties efficiently during the weary months of waiting and sickness at Gallipoli and at Varna, and also at the battles of Alma and Inkerman. He was promoted major-general on 12 December 1854.

== Death ==
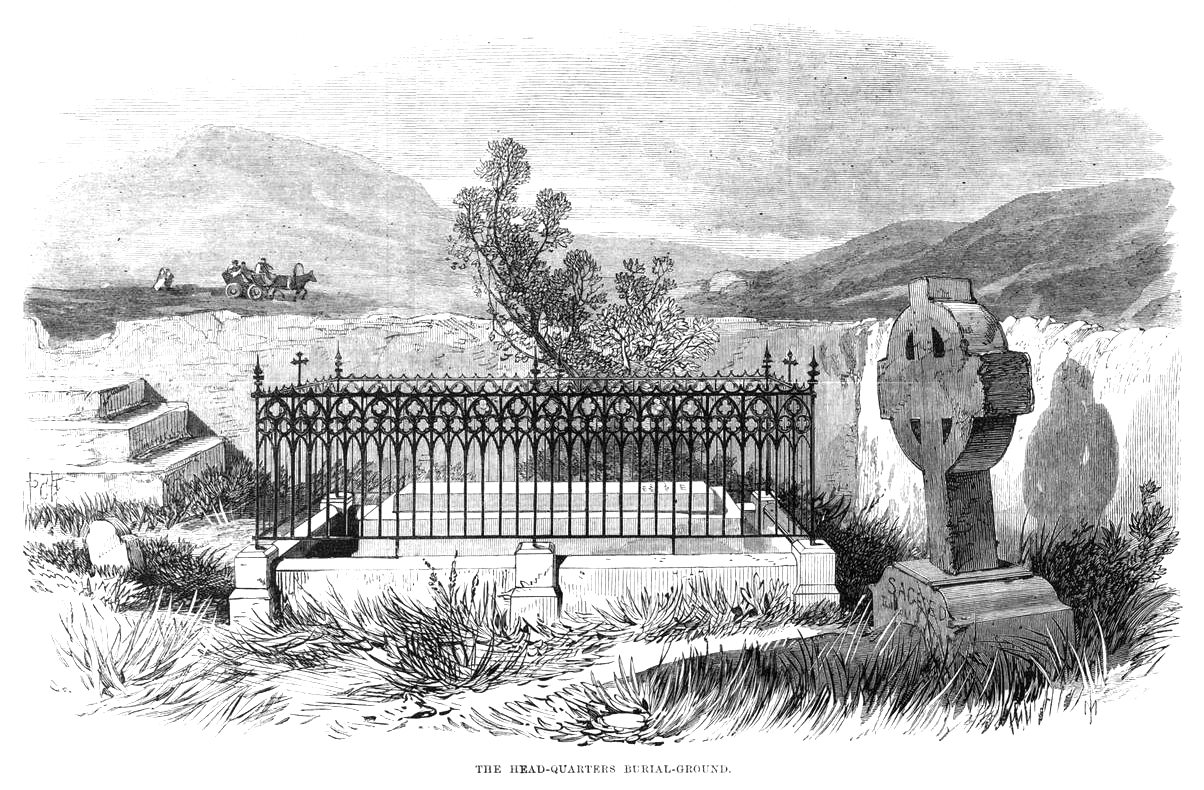
The Head-Quarters Burial-Ground, and Escourt's grave. The cross next it marks the grave of Mr. Calvert, who was interpreter at head-quarters. Brother of Frank Calvert.Illustrated London News.

Estcourt died in 1855. Edward Bruce Hamley wrote that he was 'a man of remarkably kind and courteous disposition', and Kinglake speaks of him as 'a man greatly loved by Lord Raglan, by all his friends at headquarters, and indeed by all who knew him'. Lord Raglan was afraid to attend the funeral, for fear of showing his grief; but the last visit he paid before his own death, was to Estcourt's tomb. It was announced in the London Gazette of 10 July 1855 that Estcourt would have been made a K.C.B. if he had survived. His widow, who had courageously spent the winter in camp, and had been by her husband's deathbed, was raised to the rank of a K.C.B.'s widow by special patent in 1856.
