= Marie Ellenrieder =

German painter (1791–1863)

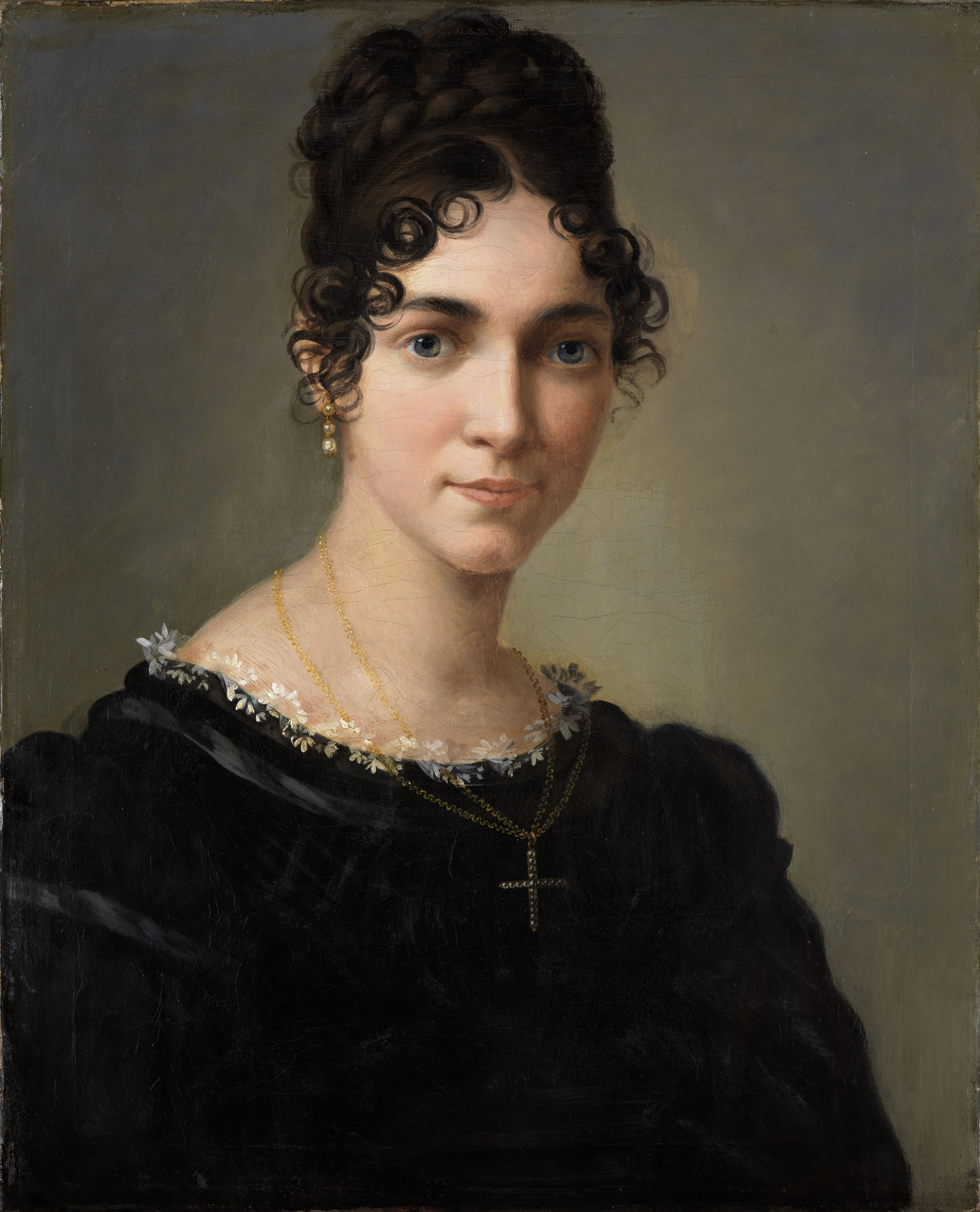
- Self portrait, 1818
- Born: 20 March 1791; Konstanz, Electorate of Baden, Holy Roman Empire
- Died: 5 June 1863 (aged 72); Konstanz, Grand Duchy of Baden, German Confederation
- Known for: Painting

Marie Ellenrieder (20 March 1791 – 5 June 1863) was a German painter, known for her portraits and religious paintings.

== Life and career ==
Ellenrieder was born in Konstanz, Germany in 1791, the daughter of Konrad and Anna Maria Herrmann, and the granddaughter of Franz Ludwig Herrmann. She was considered to be the most important German woman artist of her time.

In 1813, she enrolled in the Academy of Fine Arts Munich, making her the first woman admitted to an art academy in Germany. She thus paved the way for many other women to train professionally as artists at the Munich Academy. She studied there under the miniature painter Joseph Einsle. Her early portraits were similar in style to those of Angelica Kauffman and had a more relaxed naturalism than was usual in German portraiture of the time.

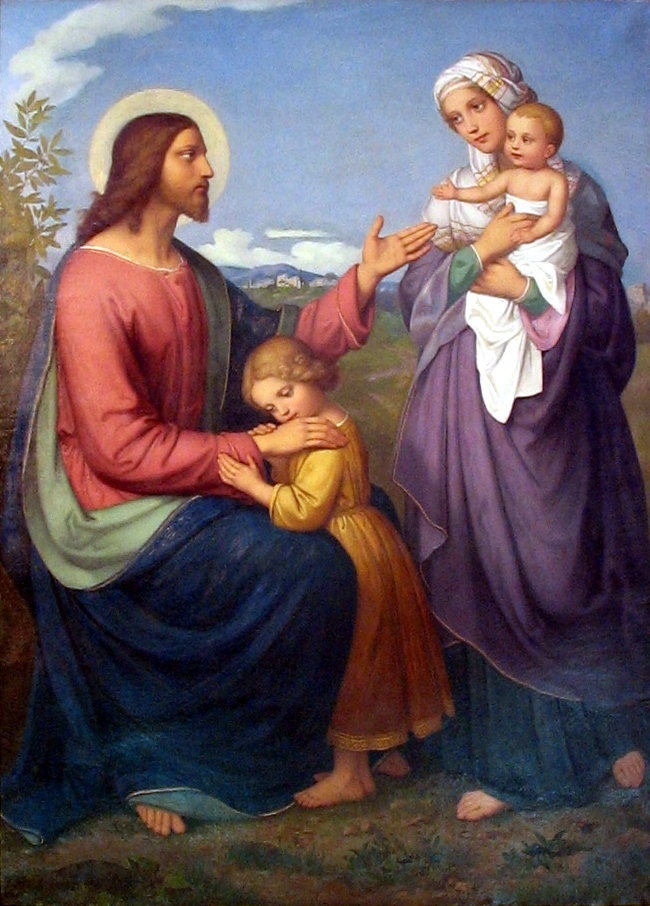
Christ Blessing Little Children

Between 1822 and 1824, during a study trip in Rome, Ellenrieder met the Nazarenes and became a disciple of Johann Friedrich Overbeck. The Nazarenes' objective was to lead a renewal of religious art in the spirit of the Italian Renaissance master Raphael, an ideal Ellenrieder adopted. After this journey, and further influenced by her friend and patron Baron von Wessenberg, she began painting religious images in the style of the Italian Renaissance, including Martyrdom of St. Stephen for the Church of St. Stephen in Karlsruhe in 1828. In 1829, she became court painter to Grand Duchess Sophie of Baden.

Ellenrieder returned to her home town in the 1840s and continued producing religious images. Her two paintings Der 12 jährige Jesus im Tempel / The 12 year old Jesus in the Temple of 1849 (oil on canvas, 203,2 x 139,7 cm) and Hl Felicitas und ihre sieben Söhne / Holy Felicitas and her Seven Sons of 1847 (oil on canvas, 127 x 177,8 cm) were acquired by Queen Victoria, who had been introduced to her work by the Prince Consort, who in turn had encountered the artist on his travels to Rome. They are now part of the Royal Collection in Osborne House.

She also taught painting, one of her notable students was Caroline Mezger. She died in her home town of Konstanz in 1863.

The largest collection of the work of Marie Ellenrieder in the United States is held by the Jack Daulton Collection in Los Altos Hills, California.

== Selected paintings ==
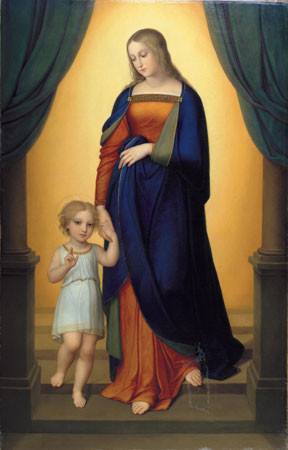
Mary and the Infant Jesus

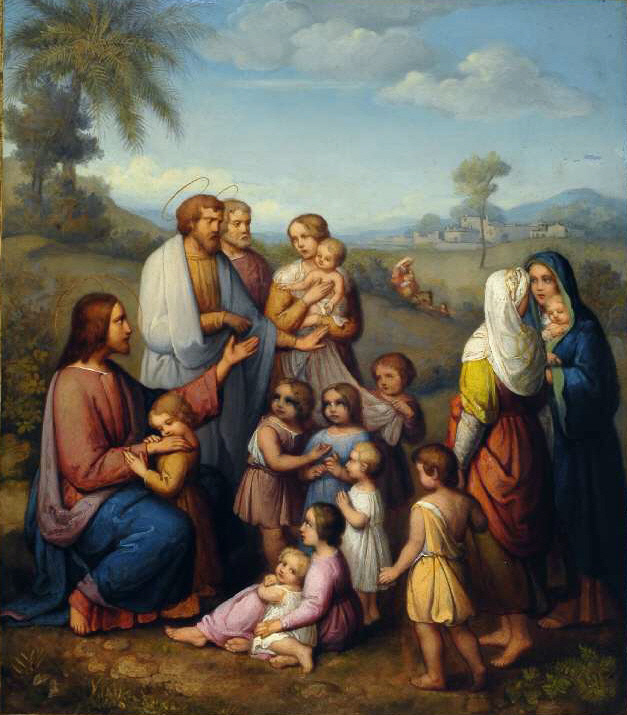
Jesus Among the Children

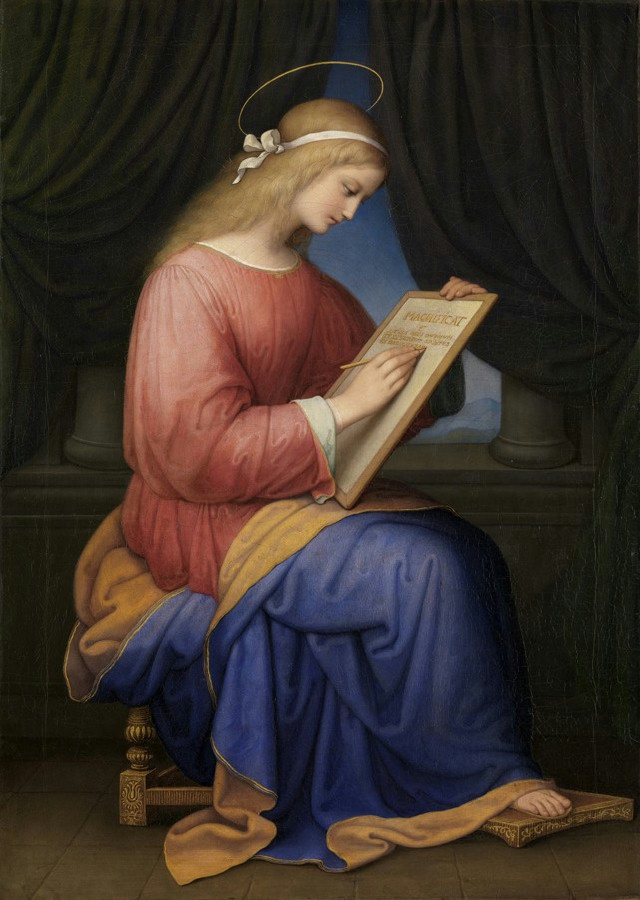
Mary Writing the Magnificat

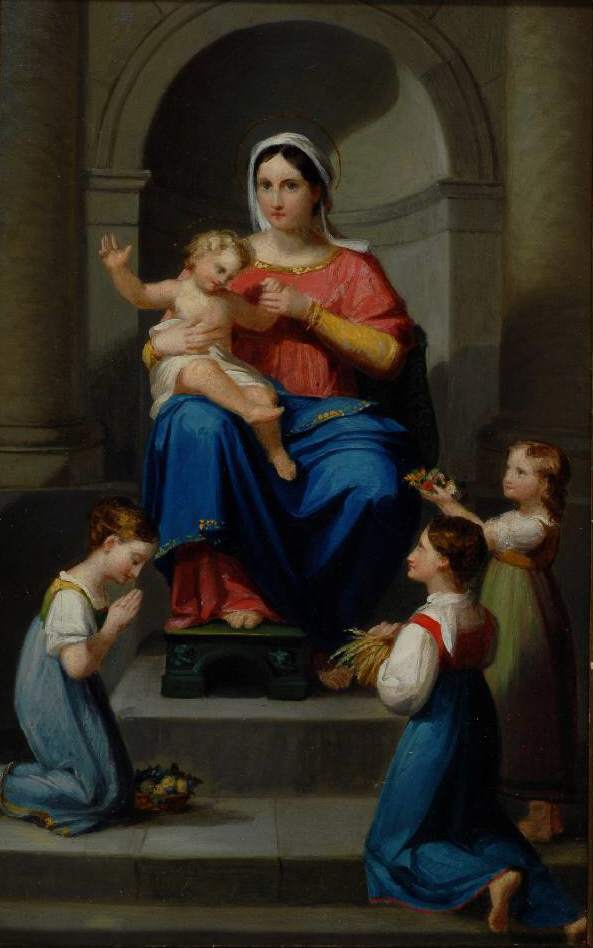
Mary with baby Jesus

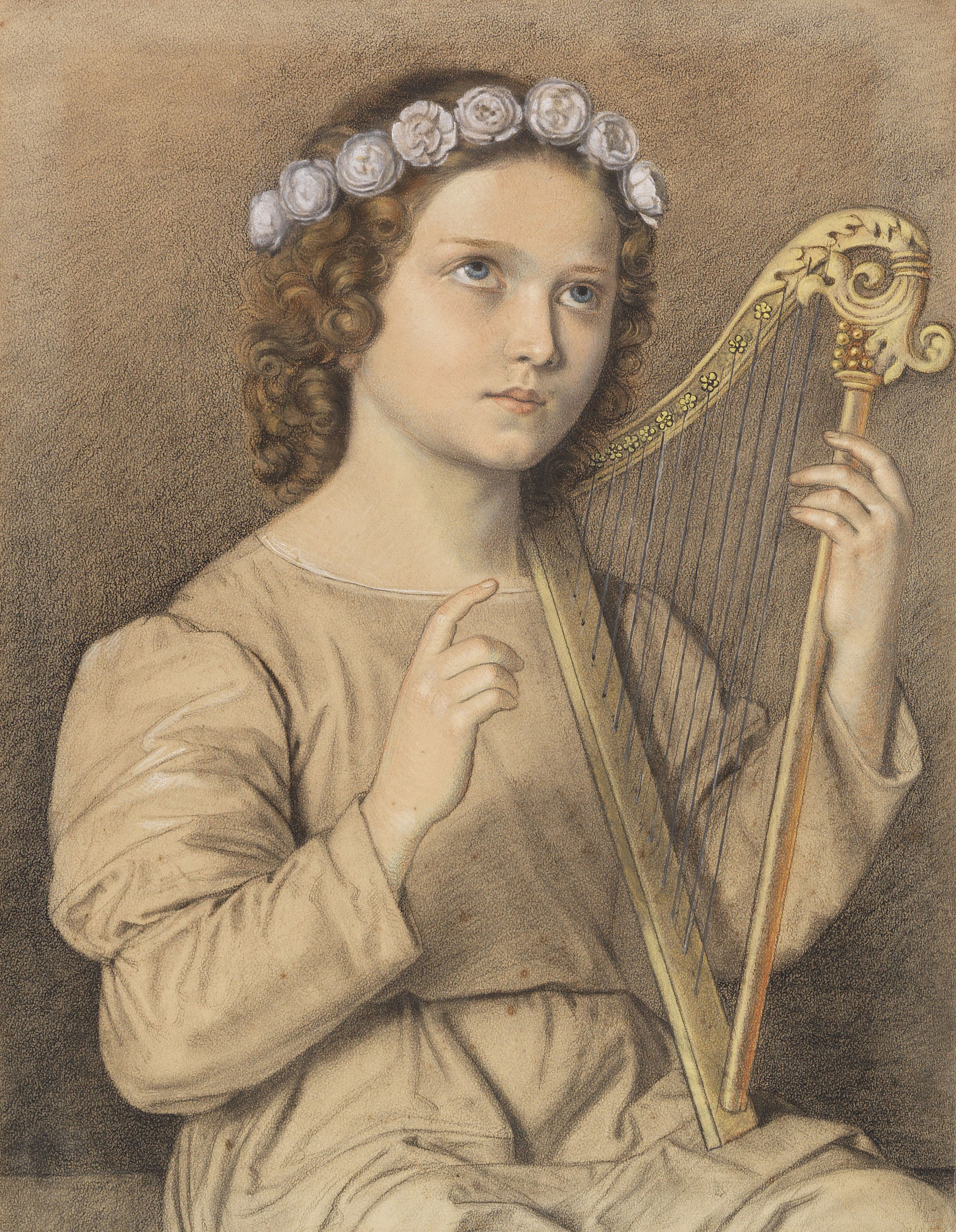
Flower-wreathed girl with harp, 1850

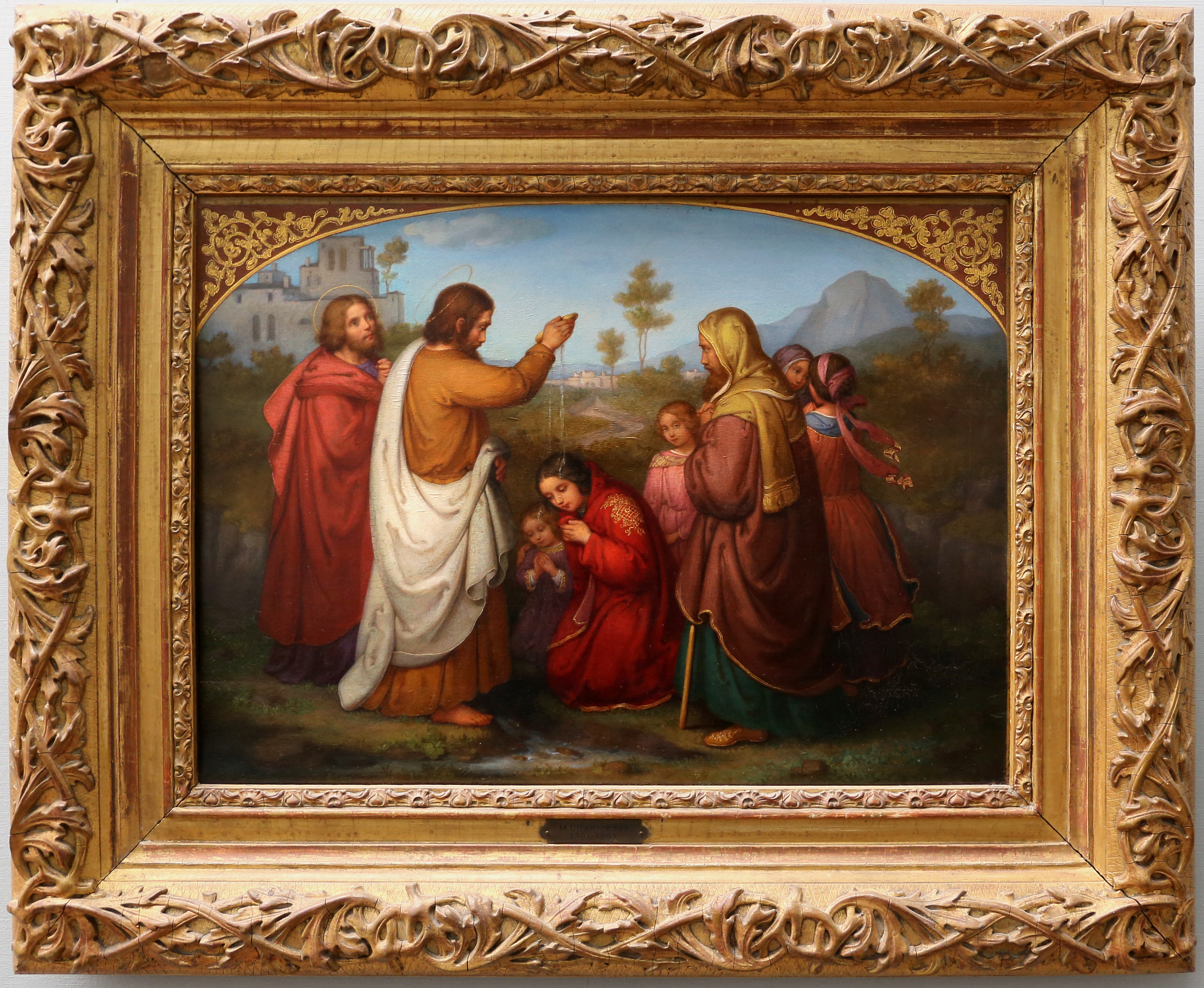
The baptism of Lydia of Thyatira, 1861

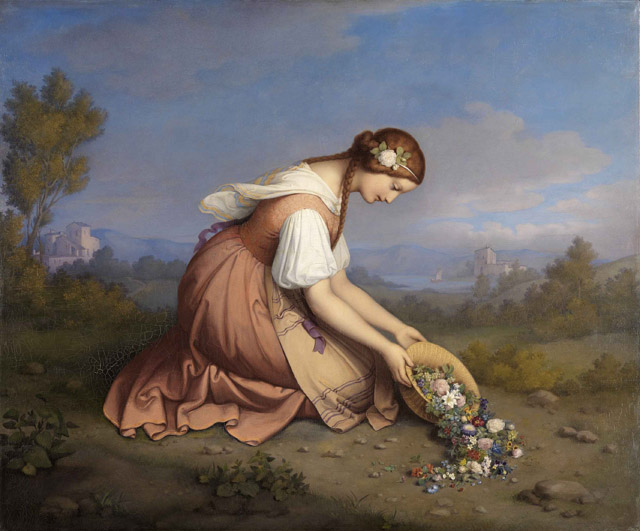
Kneeling girl, pouring out a basket of flowers, 1841

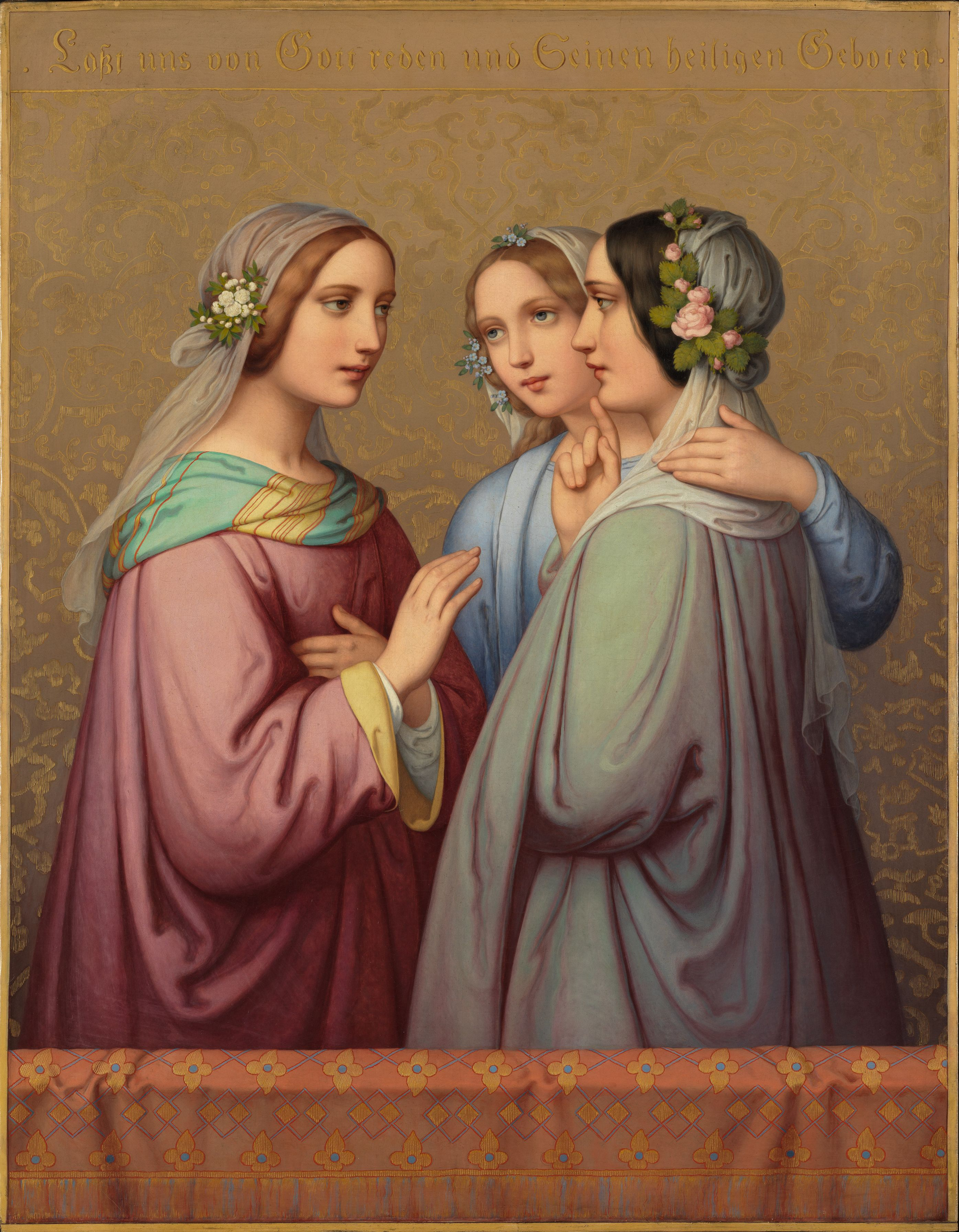
Three virgins, 1849

Saint Stephen
Among the Angels, 1857, oil on mill-board, The Jack Daulton Collection, Los Altos Hills, California

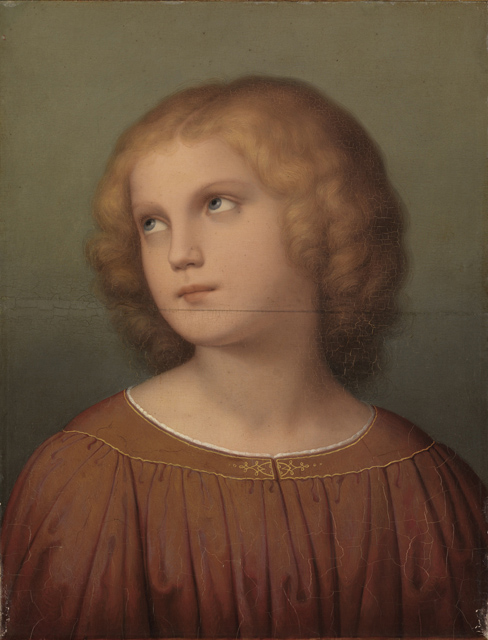
Head of a child, 1833

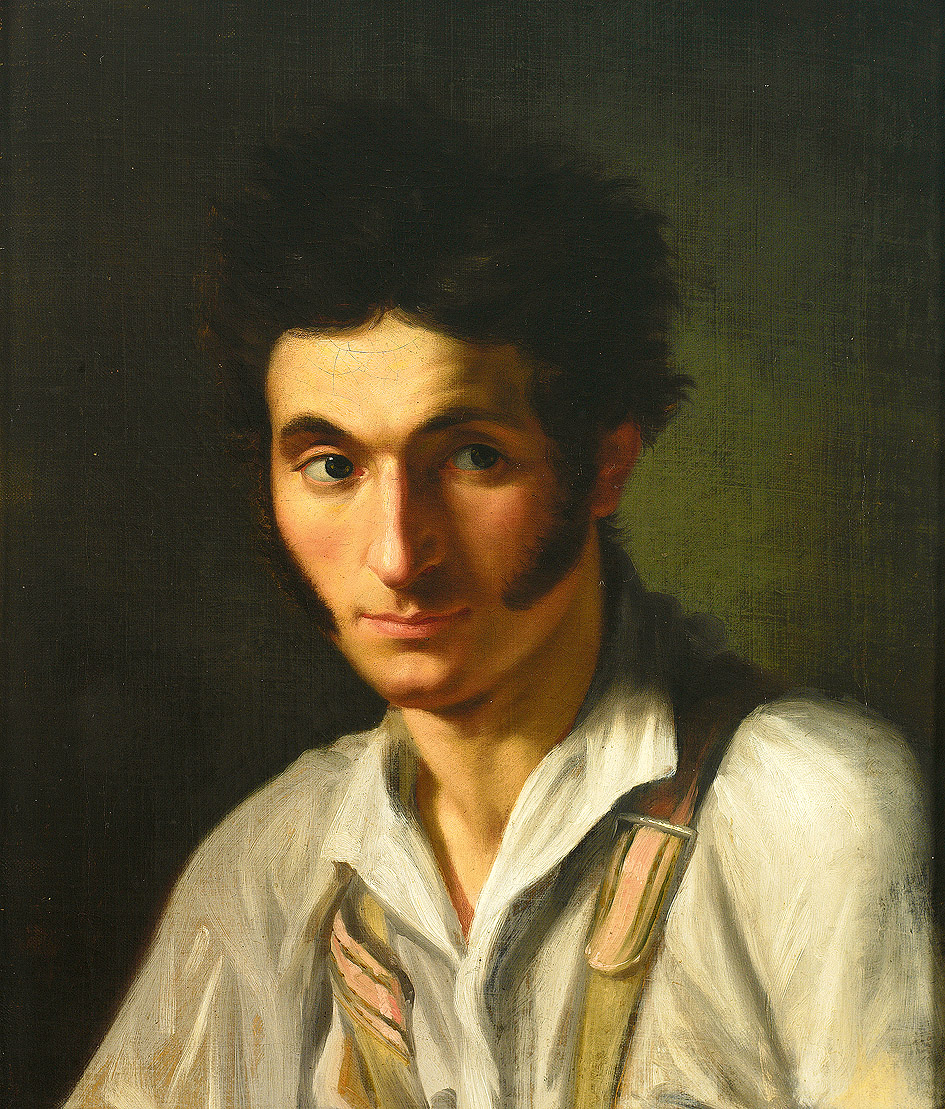
Portrait of a bearded young man, circa 1817, oil on canvas, The Jack Daulton Collection

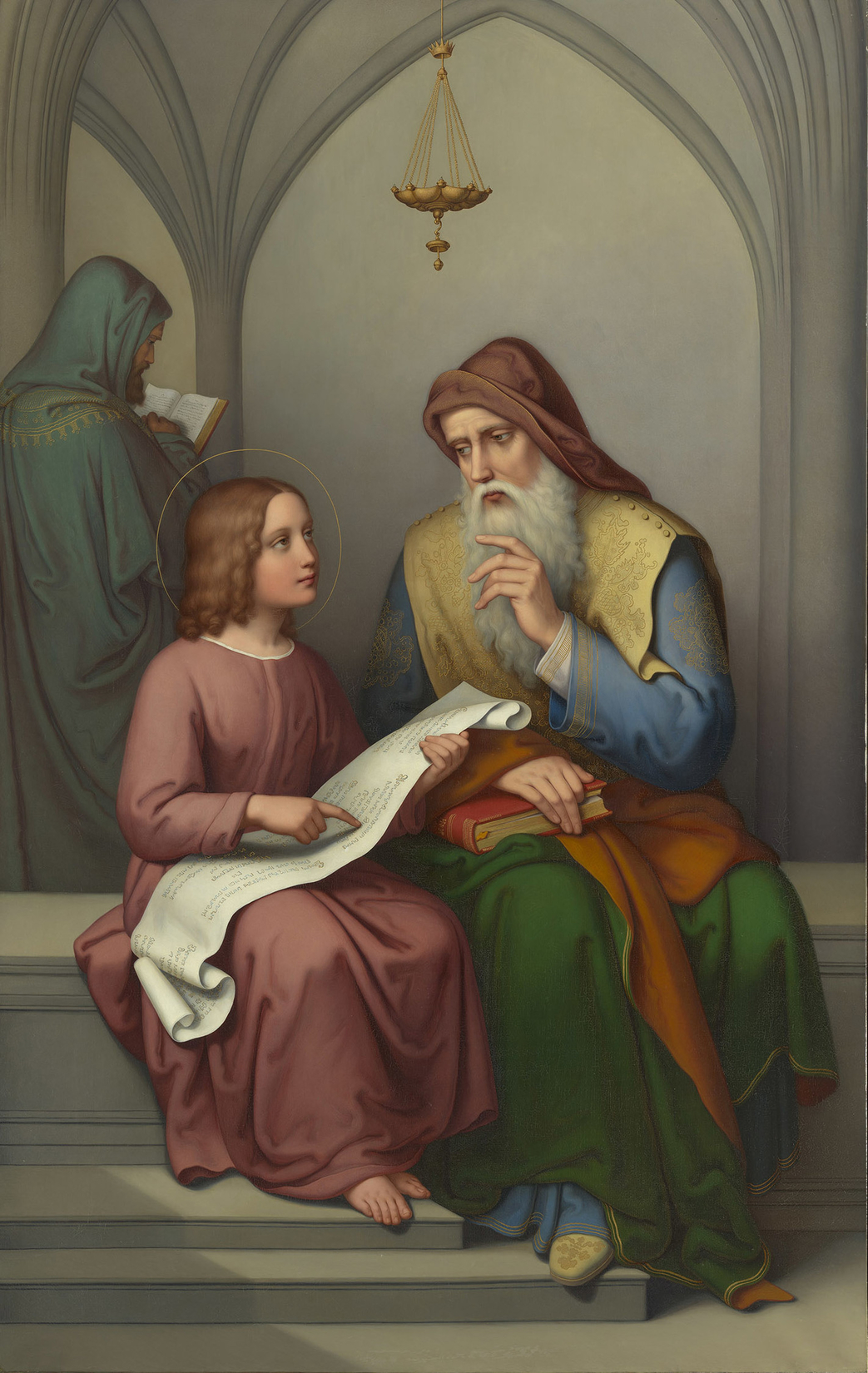
Christ in the Temple

== See also ==
- List of German painters
