= Caroline Bucknall-Estcourt =

English Artist (1809–1886)

Caroline Bucknall-Estcourt, aka Caroline Pole-Carew (1809–1886) was a British artist who was known for her Victorian album and works of Canadian views.

== Personal life ==
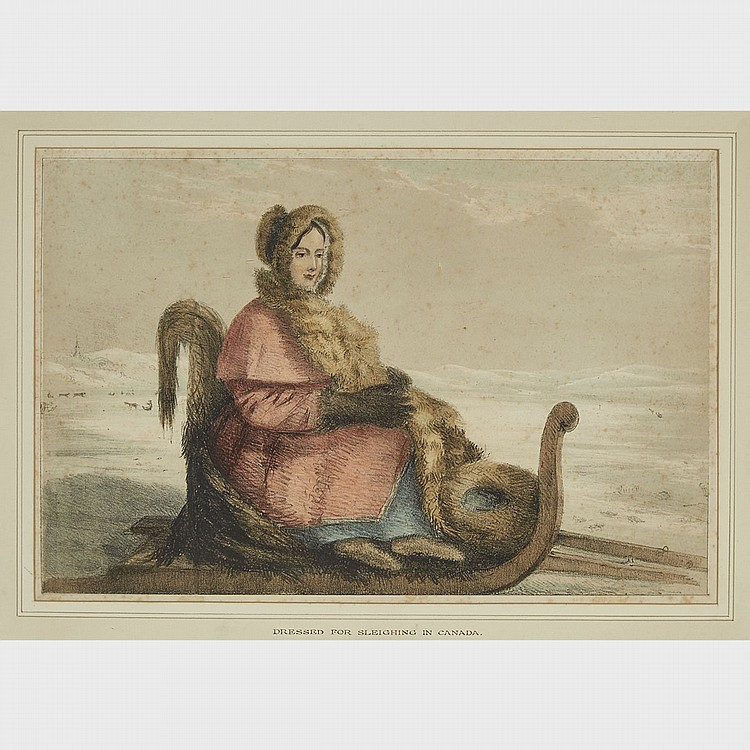
Self-Portrait Lithograph of Caroline dressed for sleighing in Canada.

Caroline Bucknall-Estcourt, born Caroline Pole Carew, was born on May 19, 1809 in Middlesex, England. Her family consisted of her sister, Marianne, and parents Lyttleton and Reginald Pole Carew who were upper echelons of British society. Caroline's mother's ancestry traced back to King Edward III of England. She met her husband, James Bucknall-Estcourt through a family connection in 1828. Her father, Reginald Pole Carew, did not view James as a suitable husband for his daughter, therefore Caroline did not marry James until her fathers death in 1837. Caroline Pole Carew became Caroline Bucknall-Estcourt at the age of twenty eight. As a British military wife she traveled the British Empire and spent four years in Canada. Caroline and her husband never had children. In 1856 James Bucknall-Estcourt died and Caroline became a widow.

== Education ==
Caroline Bucknall-Estcourt's Victorian identity allowed her the privilege to be within the small percentile of women who had access to education. The watercolour painting, Views of Drawing Room at Antony House, Cornwall, portray an image of Caroline and her sisters being taught in the sitting room at Antony House. They are working in desks surrounded by historical paintings, instruments, and learning materials. These images indicate a strong education and training in the arts, religion, and politics. Established through social connections, Estcourt's primary introduction to the fine arts was through guidance of prominent artists.

== Work ==
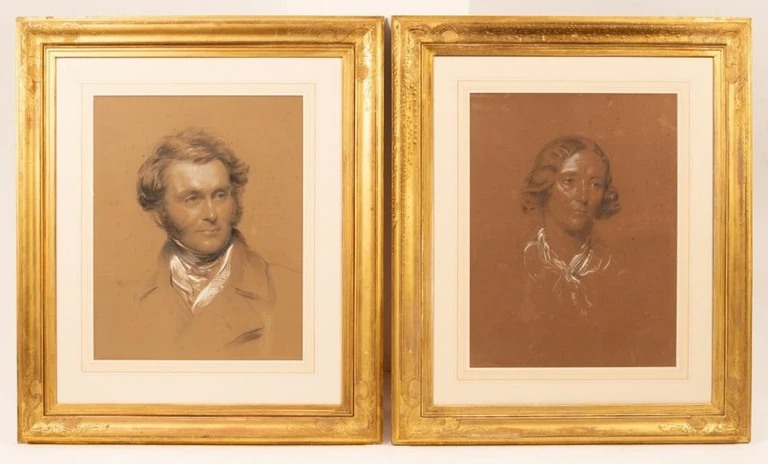
Portraits of Major General James Bucknall Estcourt M.P Caroline Bucknall Estcourt (nee Pole-Carew).

Caroline Bucknall-Escourt was a talented British amateur artist who worked on a Victorian album of loose-leaf artworks throughout her time accompanying her husband on military postings With mediums such as watercolour, paint, pencil, ink, engravings, and etchings, her artwork depicted Canadian and non-Canadian subjects of landscapes, people she met, her home, and both military and Indigenous subjects. Examples of her works include:

The Unidentified woman, is an artwork made with watercolour and pencil, and is a well known piece of Bucknall-Escourt's. It depicts an African-Canadian woman, who she refers to as a "great friend", and is presumed to have been created near Niagara Falls in 1838-1839.

Our cottage near the Falls of Niagara: Lived there from August 20, 1838 – August 30, 1839, watercolor over pencil on paper, 1838. This work depicts the house that Caroline and James Bucknall Estcourt lived in near Niagara Falls.

== Death and legacy ==
Caroline died November 17, 1886 in Forthampton Court, Forthampton, Gloucestershire aged of 77. She was buried in the Holy Trinity Churchyard in Long Newnton, Cotswold District, Gloucestershire, England. She outlived her husband Major-General James Bucknall-Estcourt by 31 years. She was declared a Knight Commander of the Order of the Bath widow in 1856. Caroline is best known for her works of Canadian views. Most importantly her Quebec winter scenes, as many of her sketches are lithographed and are a part of the Archives of Canada
