= Caroline Chariot-Dayez =

Belgian painter (born 1958)

Caroline Chariot-Dayez (born Brussels, 11 September 1958) is a Belgian hyperrealistic painter.

Although interested in painting from a very early age, she studied philosophy in order to understand what painting is. She was deeply influenced by the French phenomenologist Maurice Merleau-Ponty, who wrote extensively on perception, vision, embodiment, and painting.

Her life has been an ongoing interaction between philosophy, which she teaches, and painting. Until the age of forty, she was reluctant to show her paintings in public (with the exception of an appearance on the Belgian Broadcasting Corporation programme "The Arts at Large" in 1995).

She lives and works in Brussels.

== Exhibitions ==
- March 1999 – Galerie Elian Lisart – Brussels
- November 2000 – Galerie Tempera – Brussels (Place Royale-Koningsplein)
- December 2000 – Linéart – Ghent
- February 2001 – Galerie Brûlée – Strasbourg
- March–August 2001 – Galerie Tempera – Brussels (Place Royale-Koningsplein)
- 2002 – Galerie Brulée, Strasbourg
- 2002 – Galerie Arcadia, Lille, 2002
- 2003 – Collins and Hastie Gallery, London
- 2005 – Galerie Visconti, Paris
- April 2006 – Lars Bolander, New York City "The Fold"
- 2007 – Tessenderloo Group, Brussels
- March–April 2009 – Cathedral of Brussels, Brussels

== Bibliography ==
- "Caroline Chariot-Dayez", Editions Art in Belgium, Lasne, 2005.
