= Caroline Goldsmith =

American Arts promoter (1925–2004)

Caroline Lerner Goldsmith
- Born: Caroline Steinholz; November 12, 1925; Manhattan, New York City, U.S.
- Died: October 2, 2004 (aged 78); Manhattan, New York City
- Education: Cornell University
- Occupation: Arts promoter

Caroline Lerner Goldsmith (born Caroline Steinholz; November 12, 1925 – October 2, 2004) was a promoter of the arts who founded influential New York arts organizations.

== Early life ==
Goldsmith was born on November 12, 1925, in Manhattan, New York City. She graduated from Cornell University in 1946.

== Career ==
In 1960, Goldsmith and Helene F. Kaplan created Gallery Passport. It was one of the earliest companies to provide guided tours of museums and galleries.

From 1966 until her death, Goldsmith was an executive with Ruder Finn Arts and Communications Counsellors, and worked to promote business support for the arts. She worked on several projects, including a show of work by African American artists that toured nationally, and a 1985 film about the 25 Henry Moore statues present in New York City parks.

In 1980, Goldsmith was a founding member of ArtTable Inc., which aimed to help women in the arts meet and network. She served as executive director for its first 15 years and remained on the board until her death.

== Personal life ==
Goldsmith was married to Mortimer Lerner, and had a son named David; they had another son who predeceased her. She later married John Frank Goldsmith, who had three children previously.

Goldsmith died from a metastatic melanoma on October 2, 2004.
