= Caroline Ludlow =

British judge (1947–2014)

Her Honour Caroline Ludlow

Circuit judge for England and Wales
- In office 1997–2013

Personal details
- Born: 25 September 1947
- Died: 10 December 2014 (aged 67)
- Education: Inner Temple
- Alma mater: Queen Mary University of London

Caroline Mary Ludlow (25 September 1947 – 10 December 2014) was a British judge. She was first female judge to be appointed in East Anglia.

== Biography ==
Ludlow served as a circuit judge at courts in Suffolk and Essex. In 1970 she was called to the Bar by the Inner Temple after graduating from Queen Mary's College, University of London. In the region of East Anglia, she became the first female assistant recorder in 1992 and the first female circuit judge in 1997. While sitting at Ipswich Crown Court she dealt with cases including family law. In 2005, legal history was made when she gave the first sentence in an English court via a mobile phone. After retiring in 2013, she died the following year after being diagnosed with leukaemia.
