= Caroline Mezger =

Swiss painter, printmaker (1787–1843)

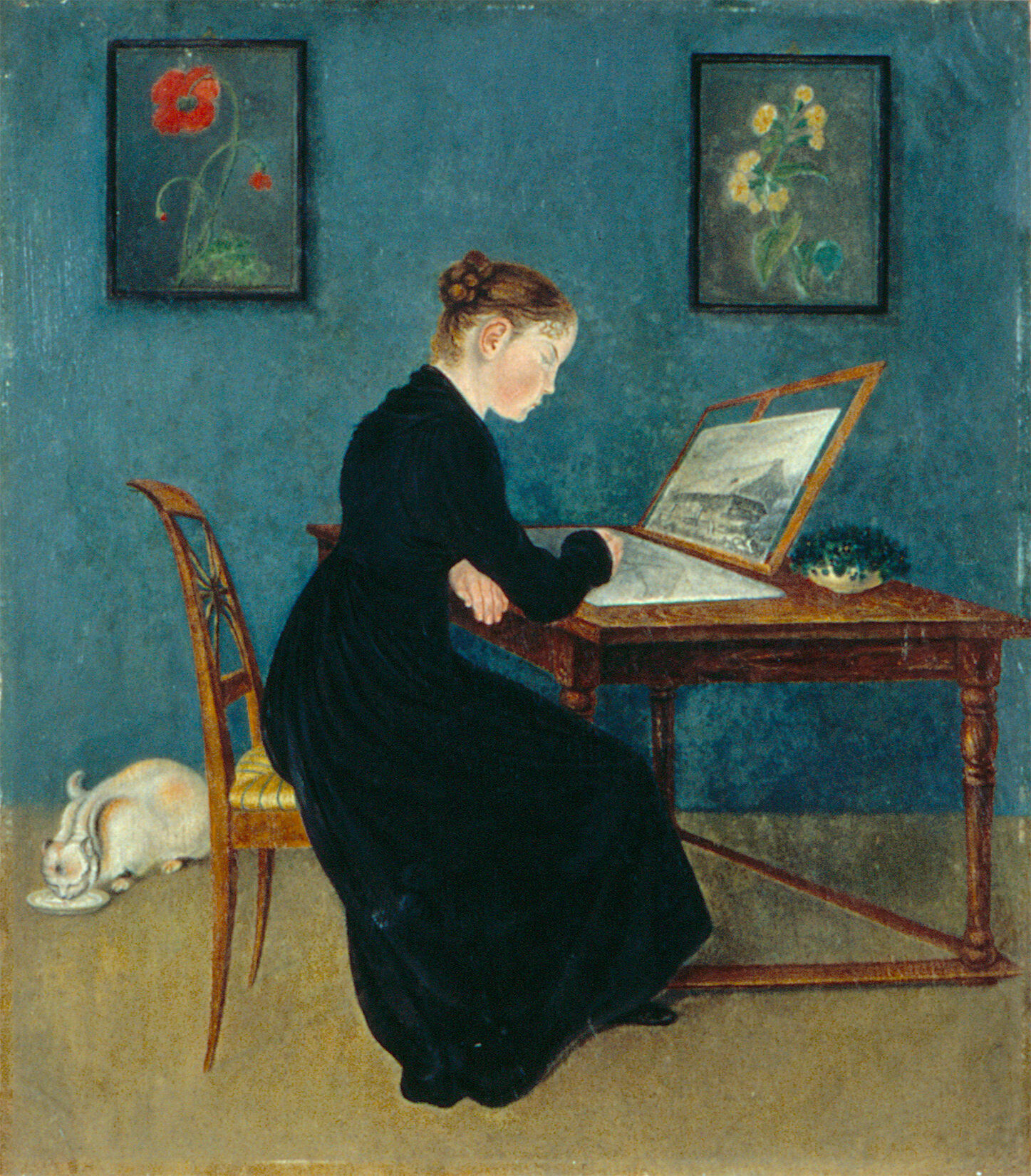
- Self portrait by Mezger (date unknown)
- Born: 8 June 1787; Schaffhausen, Switzerland
- Died: September 25, 1843 (aged 56); Feuerthalen, Switzerland
- Other names: Caroline Metzger
- Occupation(s): Painter, printmaker, teacher
- Known for: Watercolor painting, lithography

Caroline Mezger (8 June 1787 – 25 September 1843) was a Swiss painter, printmaker, and teacher. She was known for watercolor painting and lithography, and she made artwork focused on the genre art–style, family portraits, self-portraits, and caricatures. Mezger is also known as Caroline Metzger.

== Life and career ==
Caroline Mezger was born on 8 June 1787, in Schaffhausen, Switzerland. She was the daughter of Anna Margaretha Ziegler, and Johann Jakob Mezger, a history professor and pastor at the Steigkirche.

Mezger studied painting under Marie Ellenrieder in her early life; and Johann Jakob Lips (1791–1833) in her later life.

It is unclear whether her works were purchased during her lifetime. She earned her living, at least in part, as an art teacher. Mezger never had exhibitions of her artwork during her lifetime, but she did had art exhibitions in 1926 and 2000 in the Museum zu Allerheiligen, Schaffhausen.

She moved to Feuerthalen, Switzerland in her forties and spent the last years of her life there. She never married. Mezger died on 25 September 1843, in either Feuerthalen, or Schaffhausen, Switzerland.
