= Caroline Butler =

English social media personality (born 1976)

- Born: 1976 (age 49–50); Norfolk, England
- Known for: Social media personality

Caroline Butler (born 1976) is an English social media personality from south Norfolk.

She began her TikTok career in 2020 as a result of the lockdowns resulting from the covid-19 pandemic. She has always been a "savvy shopper" from a young age buying bargains since childhood and that "[she] was brought up in a 'thrifty' household. She worked as a social media manager and copyrighter between 2005 and 2025.

As of May 2025, Butler had 209k followers on TikTok.
