= Caroline Marbouty =

French writer (1803-1890

- Born: Caroline Pétiniaud; 19 July 1803; Paris, France
- Died: 16 February 1890 (aged 86); Paris, France
- Burial place: Père-Lachaise Cemetery
- Other name: Claire Brunne
- Occupation: Writer

Caroline Marbouty (born 19 July 1803, in Paris, and there died 16 February 1890) was a French writer who published her work under the pseudonym Claire Brunne or Claire Brune.

== Biography ==
=== Family and marriage ===
Caroline Pétiniaud was the daughter of Sophie Olive Joséphine de Lacoste from a wealthy family from La Rochelle, and of François Pétiniaud, merchant and advisor to the Royal Court of Limoges in 1811.

In 1822, she married Marbouty, chief clerk at the Limoges court but she became disappointed by this marriage which she considered mediocre. Officially, she kept his last name but launched into literature under the pseudonym Claire Brunne.

=== Liaison with Balzac ===
In 1833, she sought to meet the writer Honoré de Balzac, initially without success. In 1836, Balzac invited her to accompany him to Italy. To avoid gossip that would trigger the jealousy of his future wife, Ewelina Hańska, he asked Caroline to disguise herself as a young man and pretend to be his page named Marcel. The deception didn't fool the monks of the Grande Chartreuse, however, who refused him entry to the monastery. On their arrival in July, in Turin, Italy, Balzac stayed at the city's most exclusive hotel, where he booked her a room adjacent to his own and asked her to accompany him to the salons to which he was invited. There, she was mistakenly taken for the writer George Sand and invited to discuss Sand's works. Faced with the risk of scandal, the couple soon set off again, this time for Geneva, Switzerland.

=== Literary career ===
In 1842, Marbouty published Ange de Spola, a collection of three short stories (Ange de Spola, Cora, Une coquette) preceded by a resolutely feminist preface.

In 1844, she published Une fausse position (A False Position), which is seen as a novel in which she portrays Balzac rather negatively, as Ulric, a novel that is believed to be a response to Balzac's La Muse du Département. Marbouty's novel, which Michelet describes as "very strong and on the spot", portrays several personalities of the period and bears witness to the severe difficulties encountered by women authors at that time. In 1992, researcher Annette Smith wrote of the book, "Une fausse position remains not only an interesting document but courageous and dynamic fiction and deserves to be exhumed from oblivion."

=== Old age and death ===
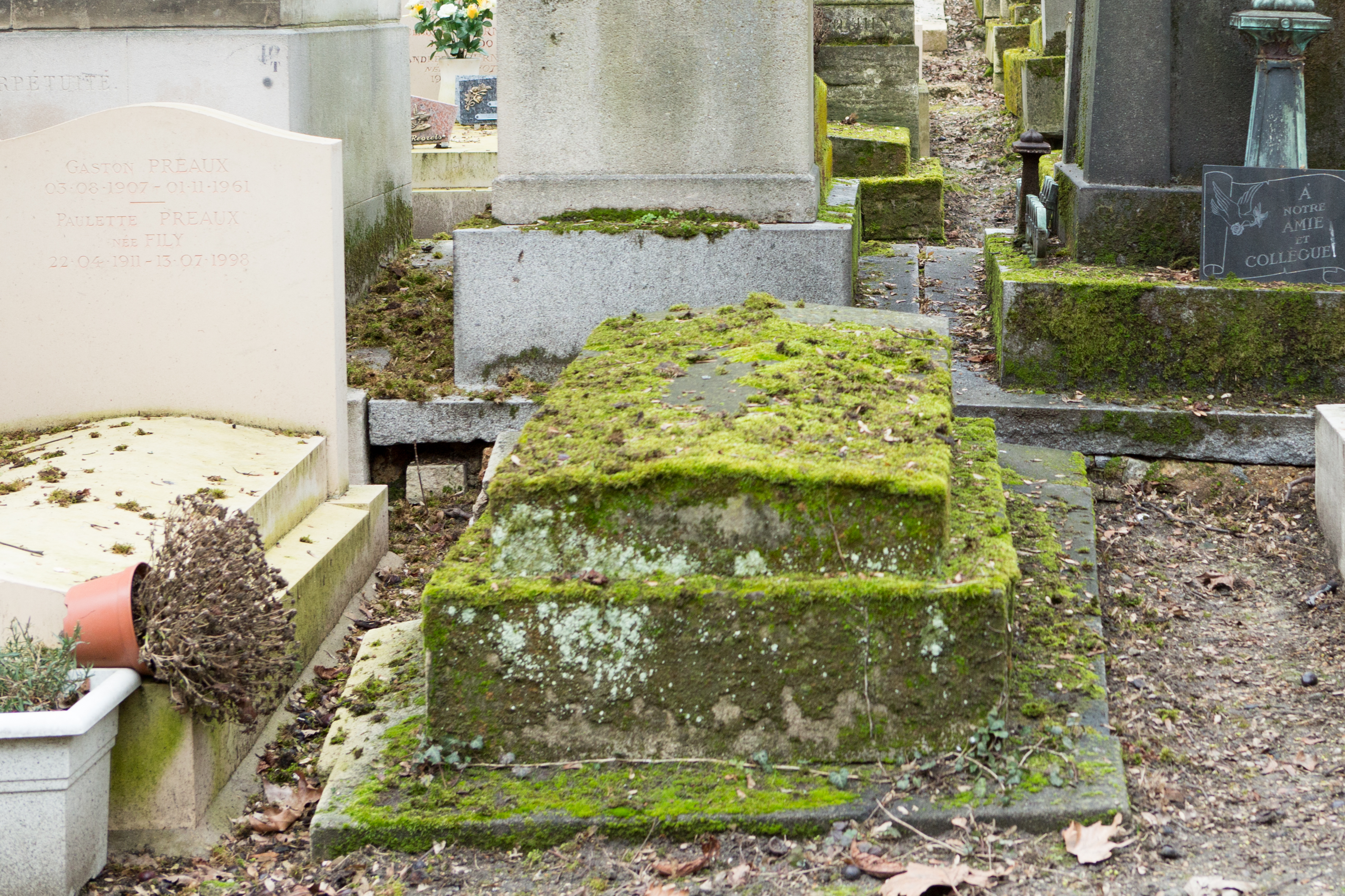
Grave of Caroline in Père-Lachaise Cemetery, Paris.

In the summer of 1858, she met the painter Eugène Delacroix at the spa town of Plombières-les-Bains, France, who kept notes in his diary about the encounter.

She lived with difficulty in old age. She had to beg for subsidies and her life ended dramatically when she was run over by a bus in Paris on 16 February 1890. She is buried in the Père-Lachaise Cemetery (16th division).

== Selected works ==
Using the synonym of Claire Brunne:

- Ange de Spola. 1: Women's studies, 1842
- Ange de Spola. 2: Women's studies, 1842
- Dupuytren et Palissy, ou les Jolis contes vrais, 1842
- Une fausse position (A False Position), 1844
- Le Marquis de Précieux, ou les Trois époques, 1812-1820-1850, 1850
- L'Unité du pouvoir, concordat politique, brochure servant de préface à la pièce “le Mariage”, destinée au Théâtre-français..., 1859
- L'Organisation des intelligences, 1866
- Un artiste au XIX^{e} siècle, L’Artiste, 1845, p. 165-169
- avec Émile Souvestre : La Protectrice, p. 1-16
