= Elizabeth Donald (painter) =

British / New Zealand painter (1858–1940)

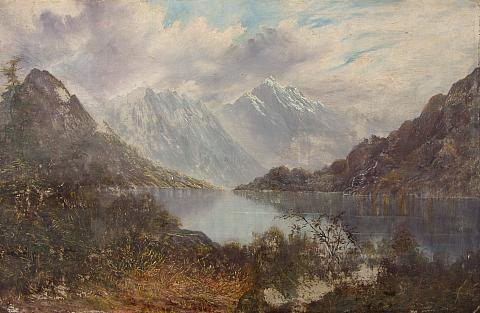
Elizabeth Donald

Elizabeth Donald (1858–1940) was a British/New Zealand painter.
