= Caroline Barratt-Pugh =

Australian researcher

Caroline Hilary Barratt-Pugh (born November 1954) is an Australian scholar known for her contributions to early childhood education. She has been a professor and director of Early Childhood Research at Edith Cowan University (ECU), Perth, Western Australia, since 1992.

== Early life and education ==
Barratt-Pugh was born to Jean Proud (née Hannon) and Clifford Proud in November 1954.

She left Grange Girls' Grammar School at 16 to become a teaching assistant, eventually pursuing teacher training at Margaret Macmillan Training College. She later converted her qualification into a degree at the University of Leeds, where her passion for early literacy began under the mentorship of Joan Tough.

== Career ==
Barratt-Pugh began her teaching career in Keighley and contributed to professional development programs for teachers in Bradford. Her doctoral research at Leeds University focused on bilingual learners’ language development, laying the foundation for her career in applied linguistics.

She joined Manchester Metropolitan University, where she collaborated with notable educators, including Leslie Abbott, Andy Pickard and Nigel Hall, to advance teacher training pedagogy. In 1992, she moved to ECU, where she expanded her work in early literacy.

Barratt-Pugh’s interest in early literacy learning has included several longitudinal collaborative research projects. The evaluation over two decades of the Better Beginnings book gifting program, led to the recent development of Kindytext, which provided parents with weekly text messages supporting children’s literacy. She also contributed to an ARC Centre of Excellence dedicated to creating positive digital childhoods for all Australian children.

== Awards ==
- 2021 Australian Award for Outstanding Engagement for Research Impact
- Finalist for the 2021 World Literacy Academic Award

== Selected publications ==
- Literacy Learning in the Early Years (2020)
- Literacy learning in Australia: Practical ideas for early childhood educators (2006)
