= Caroline Langat Thoruwa =

Kenyan chemist

- Education: Kenyatta University
- Known for: Research in natural products chemistry; leadership in STEM and research innovation
- Scientific career
- Fields: Chemistry, Natural products chemistry, Pharmaceuticals
- Workplaces: Kenyatta University

Caroline Langat Thoruwa is a Kenyan chemist. She is a professor of chemistry at Kenyatta University and the director of its Nairobi City satellite campus.

Langat Thoruwa is also the chairperson of African Women in Science and Engineering, a member of the board of the International Network Women Engineers & Scientists, and a member of the technical committee of ACTIL Knowledge Hub.

== Leadership and outreach ==
Thoruwa currently serves as the Acting Deputy Vice‑Chancellor for Research, Innovation and Outreach at Kenyatta University. In March 2025, she opened and led a managerial staff workshop on mainstreaming science, technology, and innovation (STI) into the university's academic and operational framework, emphasising research funding, collaborative partnerships, and the integration of STI into teaching and learning aligned with national development goals.

She has also supported university research showcases such as the My Smart Farm exhibition at the Nairobi International Trade Fair.

Thoruwa has represented Kenyatta University in collaborative events with organisations like AMPATH, fostering insights into research capacity and community impact.

She has also engaged with external groups to promote leadership development initiatives among students and staff, including discussions with Life Ministry Kenya on mentorship and values‑based leadership programmes.
