= Robert Henderson Donald =

Confederate soldier and Texas politician

Member of the Texas House of Representatives from the 21st district
- In office January 13, 1874 – April 18, 1876

Personal details
- Born: August 7, 1821 Rhea County, Tennessee, US
- Died: 1890 (aged 68–69) Lewisville, Texas, US
- Party: Democratic

Military service
- Allegiance: Confederate States
- Branch: Confederate States Army
- Rank: Sergeant
- Wars: American Civil War

Robert Henderson Donald (1821–1890) was a Confederate soldier, serving in Colonel James G. Bourland's "Border Regiment" during the American Civil War. After the war he became a Texas state representative.

== Life ==
Robert Henderson Donald was born in Rhea County, Tennessee on August 7, 1821. He relocated to Alabama in 1836, where on December 22, 1842 he married Sarah F. Rowe, and by her had four sons and six daughters. In 1852 he moved his family to Texas, living initially in Smith County, before settling in Denton County, where Donald ran a homestead which grew to 1,200 acres (486 ha) of land. At the outbreak of the Civil War in 1861, Donald enlisted in the Confederate cause, joining Colonel James G. Bourland's "Border Regiment" of cavalry as sergeant. After the war, he became a Texas state representative. He died at Lewisville, Texas in 1890.

== See also ==
- Fourteenth Texas Legislature

== Sources ==
- Miller, Aragorn Storm (November 19, 2014). "Donald, Robert H. (1821–1890)". Handbook of Texas Online. Texas State Historical Association.
- "Robert Henderson Donald". Legislative Reference Library of Texas.

Attribution:

- "Hon. Robert H. Donald". Biographical Souvenir of the State of Texas: Containing Biographical Sketches of the Representative Public, and Many Early Settled Families. Chicago, IL: F. A. Battey & Company. 1889. p. 254.
