= Caroline Rannersberger =

Australian visual artist

Caroline Rannersberger (born 1961 in Adelaide) is an Australian visual artist based in Tasmania. Her work spans several mediums, including painting, installation art, printmaking, and curating.

Rannersberger is best known for landscape paintings that examine "the dualities of the natural landscape". Much of her work is influenced by the rhizomatic model of Deleuzian philosophy (Gilles Deleuze), in which the existence of multiple viewpoints, rather than one fixed perspective, enables a landscape to contain multiple (and even shifting) points of connection across time and space.

Rannersberger has collaborated with other artists in multi-form installations, including New York-based Australian musician Sam Nester.

Her work is held by the National Gallery of Australia and the Museum and Art Gallery of the Northern Territory.

Rannersberger has been a finalist in major Australian art prizes, including the Glover Prize.

Rannersberger is a director of the Bruny Island Foundation for the Arts.
