= Caroline Wong =

American computer scientist (born 1983)

Wong, Caroline
- Born: 1983 (age 42–43); San Francisco
- Education: BS in Electrical Engineering and Computer Science
- Awards: 2010 Women of Influence Award in the One to Watch category from the Executive Women's Forum
- Scientific career
- Institutions: Cobalt

Caroline Wong is an American chief cybersecurity executive who has worked to advance software security programs and promote the mission, vision, and values diversity and inclusion in cybersecurity. Throughout her career, Wong has been working to "boost the number of women in the field" and advocate for workplace equality. She regularly speaks at industry events and in publications such as The Washington Post and CBS News, and publishes editorial articles on topics such as DevSecOps alignment, infosec best practices, diversity in cybersecurity, and women in tech.

== Biography ==
Caroline Wong was born in San Francisco in 1983. Her mother studied microbiology in school and her uncles run their own engineering firms. She later received a bachelor's degree in electrical engineering and computer science from UC Berkeley and holds a certificate in finance and accounting from Stanford University Graduate School of Business. Early in her career, Wong worked as a Cigital consultant, a Symantec product manager, and held cybersecurity leadership roles at eBay and Zynga. Wong now works as the Chief Strategy Officer at Cobalt. Cobalt is a cybersecurity startup which connects highly skilled hackers with organizations who need their software tested for security vulnerabilities.

== Selected works ==
In 2012, Wong's textbook, Security Metrics: A Beginner's Guide has been inducted into the Cybersecurity Canon Hall of Fame in 2022. She also has contributed to several books, including Epic Failures in DevSecOps Vol. 1; CISO COMPASS: Navigating Cybersecurity Leadership Challenges with Insights from Pioneers; Cybersecurity Career Guide: Who Works in Cybersecurity, How We Got Started, Why We Need You; IT Security Metrics: A Practical Framework for Measuring Security & Protecting Data; and Back to Basics: Focusing on the fundamentals to boost cybersecurity and resilience. Currently, Wong teaches cybersecurity courses on LinkedIn Learning, which ranked one of the top courses of 2022, and is a member of the Forbes Technology Council. She wrote a book on Pentesting as a Service (PtaaS) with The PtaaS Book. She also hosts a podcast called the Humans of InfoSec. Her most recent book is The AI Cybersecurity Handbook.

== Awards and achievements ==
In 2010, Wong received a Women of Influence Award in the One to Watch category from the Executive Women's Forum. She has been featured as an Influencer in the 2017 Women in IT Security issue of SC Magazine and has been named one of the Top Women in Cloud by CloudNOW. She was named 2019 Cyber Educator of the Year by the Women's Society of Cyberjutsu. In 2020, Wong was recognized as a Power Player for Women in IT Security by SC Magazine. In 2021, Wong won a Gold award for Cybersecurity Strategist of the Year in the Cybersecurity Excellence Awards and was recognized as Security Expert of the Year in the Cyber Defense Global InfoSec Awards.

Wong is regularly featured as a speaker at industry conferences and virtual events including Interzone, DevOps Unbound, RSA, OWASP, and BSides. She has also been feature in Protocol and Forbes being recently hailed as one of the 15 most influential women in tech alongside Meg Whitman and Sheryl Sandberg.
