= Hector Girvan =

Scottish footballer (1899–1969)

Personal information
- Full name: Hector MacDonald Girvan
- Date of birth: 10 December 1899
- Place of birth: Shettleston, Scotland
- Date of death: 1969 (aged 69–70)
- Position: Full-back

Senior career*
Years	Team	Apps	(Gls)
1922–1923	Townhead Benburb		
1923–1924	Parkhead Juniors		
1924–1926	Bo'ness		
1926–1929	Reading	33	(0)
1929–1933	Swindon Town	149	(0)
1933–1935	Margate		
1935	Ramsgate		
1935	Canterbury Waverley		
Total		182	(0)
- * Club domestic league appearances and goals

Hector MacDonald Girvan (10 December 1899 – 1969) was a Scottish footballer who played in the Football League for Reading and Swindon Town.
