= Bobby Donald =

Australian rules footballer

Personal information
- Full name: Robert William Donald
- Born: 10 March 1894; Richmond, Victoria
- Died: 16 May 1962 (aged 68); Cheltenham, Victoria
- Original team: Golden Point
- Position: Wing

Playing career^{1}
Years	Club	Games (Goals)
1914–15	St Kilda	7 (2)
1915, 1918–20	Essendon	22 (3)
Total		29 (5)
- ^{1} Playing statistics correct to the end of 1920.

Robert William Donald (10 March 1894 – 16 May 1962) was an Australian rules footballer who played with St Kilda and Essendon in the Victorian Football League (VFL).
