= Caroline Bassett =

British media theorist and academic

Caroline Bassett is a British media theorist, cultural critic, and feminist scholar. She is Professor of Digital Humanities at the University of Cambridge, where she directs research on digital culture, critical theory, and the politics of technology.

== Career ==
Bassett's work explores the cultural, political, and aesthetic dimensions of digital technology, with a particular focus on feminism, media history, and critical theory. Before joining Cambridge, she taught at the University of Sussex, where she was Professor of Media and Communications. She has published on artificial intelligence, digital humanities, and the history of computing.

== Selected works ==
- The Arc and the Machine: Narrative and New Media (Manchester University Press, 2007)
- Feminism, Digital Culture and the Politics of Transmission: Theory, Practice, Transformation (Rowman & Littlefield International, 2018)
- Anti-Computing: Dissent and the Machine (Manchester University Press, 2022)
