= Caroline Dayer =

Swiss feminist educator

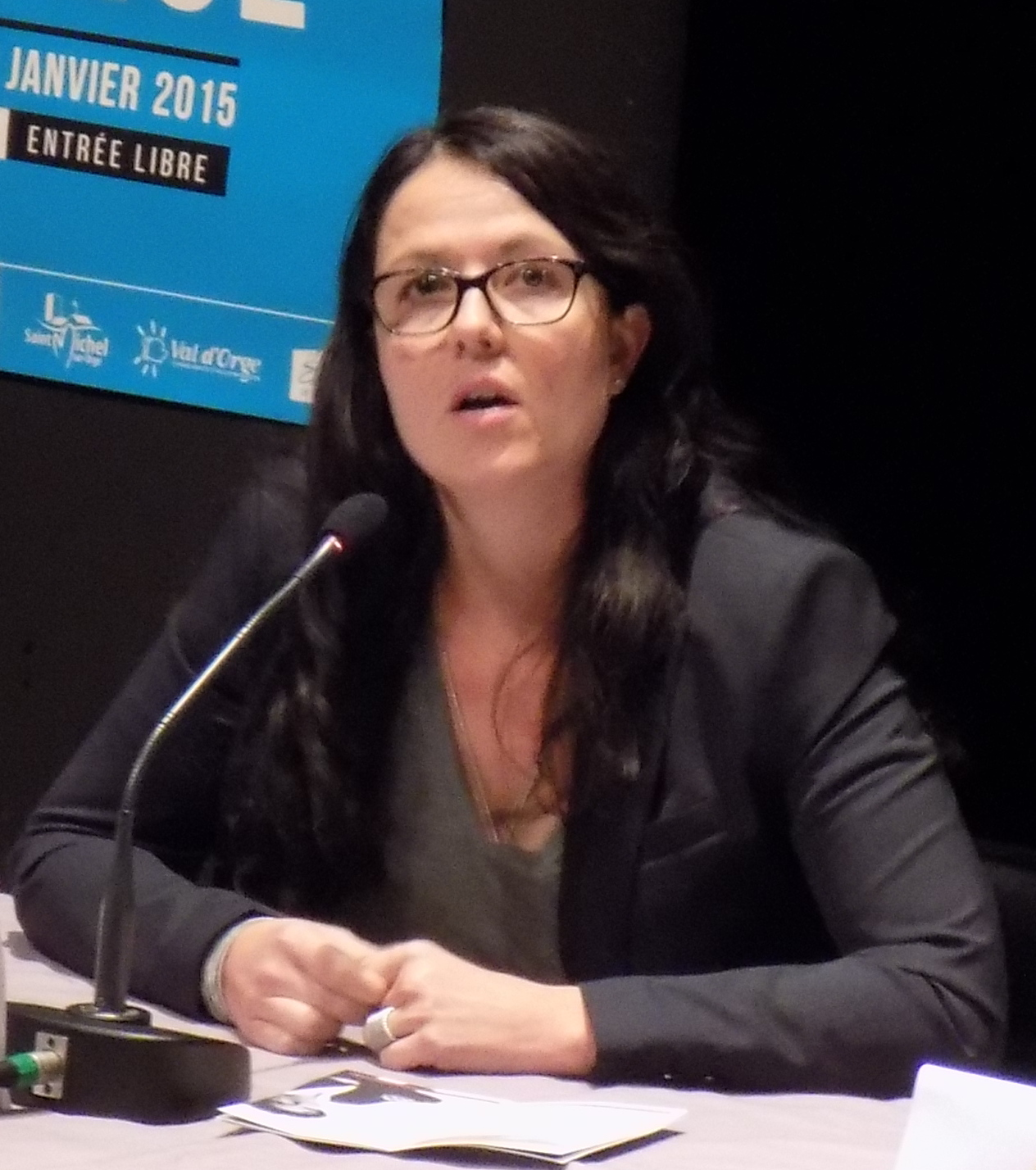
- Born: December 30, 1978 (age 47)
- Occupation: Gender studies

Academic work
- Discipline: Sociology
- Sub-discipline: Gender and science; Women's studies
- Institutions: Paris 8 University Vincennes-Saint-Denis
- Notable works: Le pouvoir de l'injure

Caroline Dayer (born December 30, 1978) is a Swiss feminist researcher, educator and writer specializing in gender studies. She is known for her engagement in LGBT rights and makes regular interventions as an expert in the media in Switzerland on issues like homophobia, sexism and street harassment.

== Education ==
Caroline Dayer was born on December 30, 1978, in Sion. Her father was a civil engineering contractor and her mother secretary. Dayer was brought up in Hérémence with her older brother. She received an egalitarian education with her brother and played soccer in league B, with FC Vétroz. She had her first romantic encounter with a woman at the age of 17, but did not confide in her mother on the subject until five years later. She wrote a dissertation, De l'injure à la gay pride, quelle formation et construction de sens? which enabled her to obtain a degree in educational sciences. She also holds a diploma in general studies in humanities and social sciences, which she obtained from the University of Paris VIII in 2004, and a certificate from the École doctorale lémanique in gender studies in 2008. In 2009, after the sudden death of her father at the beginning of the year, she submitted a study for her PhD on the issues of discrimination and equality.

Dayer continued her training by completing a scientific residency at the École normale supérieure (ENS) and the École des hautes études en sciences sociales (EHESS) in Paris in 2012, on the design of training and public policies. In 2016, she undertook a training in management.

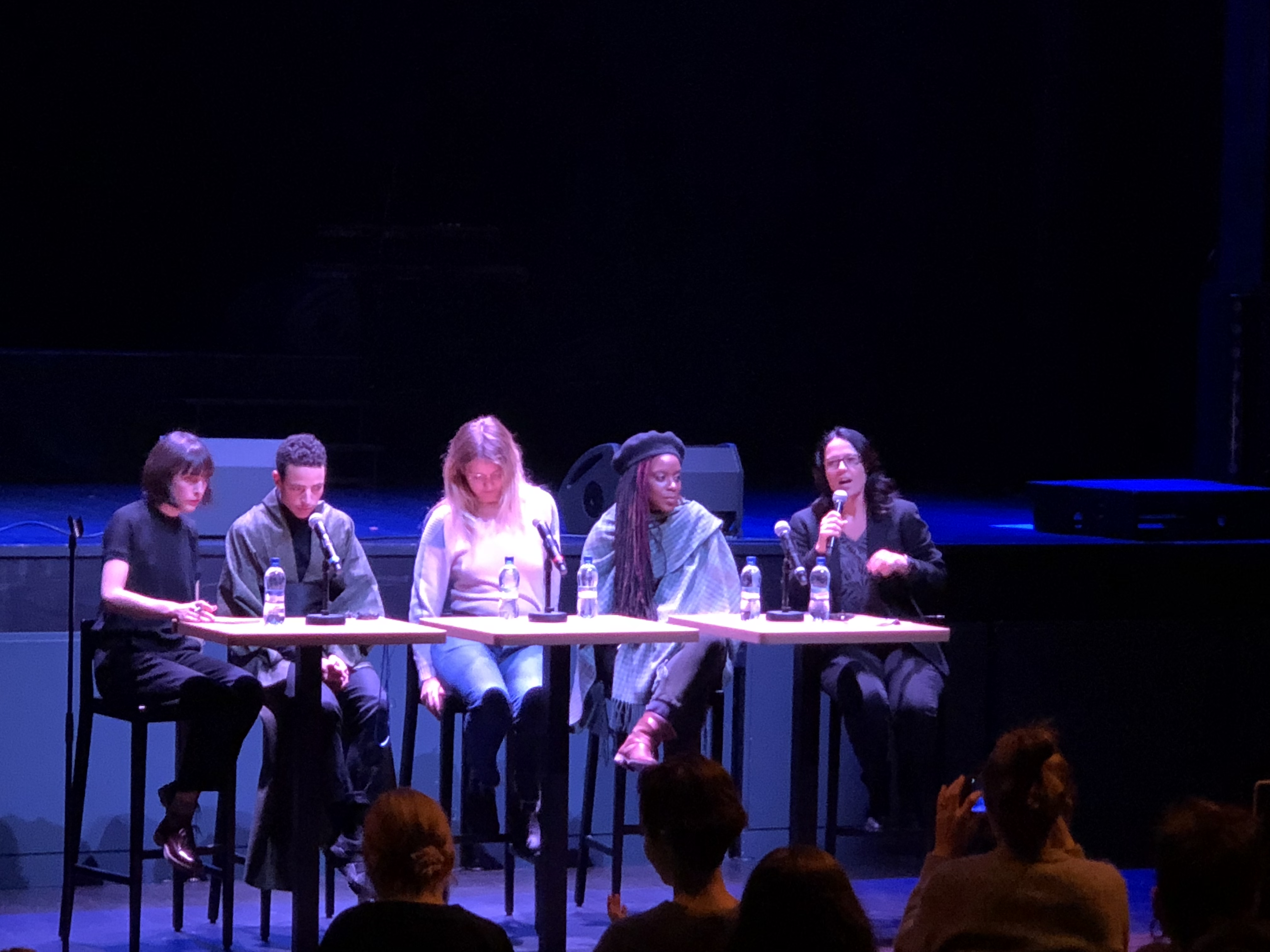
Caroline Dayer at the Festival Les Créatives in Geneva, 2018.

== Career ==
Dayer taught for 13 years at the University of Geneva, before becoming an expert in the prevention of violence and discrimination for the canton of Geneva. In 2020, she was appointed expert on homophobia and transphobia in educational institutions at the General Secretariat of the Department of Education, Youth and Culture of the Canton of Vaud.

In 2017 Dayer published the book Le pouvoir de l'injure, analyzing various factors behind the emergence of insults, particularly homophobic ones : gender transgression, the absence of adherence and conformity to majority norms and relational and group dynamics that lead to increased discrimination.

In 2020, Dayer was appointed expert on homophobia and transphobia in educational institutions at the General Secretariat of the Department of Education, Youth and Culture of the Canton of Vaud.

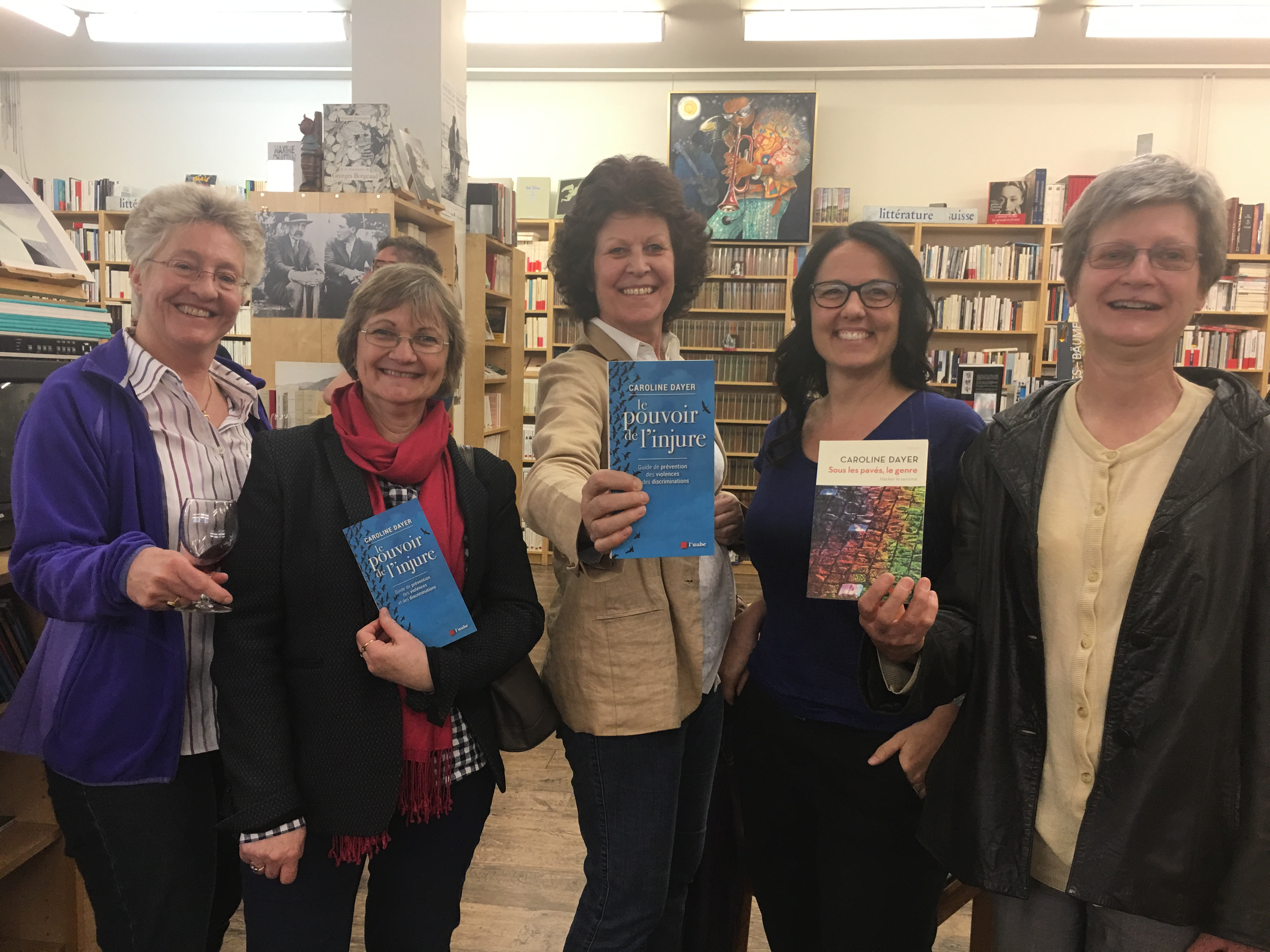
Présentation of Caroline Dayer's book Le pouvoir de l'injure in Sion, 2017.

== Selected works ==
- Construction et transformation d'une posture de recherche: examen critique de la pensée classificatoire, Saarbrücken, 2010.
- Sous les pavés, le genre : hacker le sexisme, La Tour d'Aigue, 2014.
- with Maryvonne Charmillot et Marie-Noëlle Schürmans, La restitution des savoirs: un impensé des sciences sociales ? Paris, 2014.
- avec Maryvonne Charmillot et Marie-Noëlle Schürmans, Connaissance et émancipation : dualisme, tensions, politique, Paris, 2014.
- Le pouvoir de l'injure: guide de prévention des violences et des discriminations, La Tour d'Aigues, 2017.
