= Caroline Corinth =

Danish model (born 1994)

- Born: July 20, 1994 (age 31); Copenhagen, Hovedstaden, Denmark
- Occupation: Model
- Modeling information
- Height: 1.77 m (5 ft 9 1/2 in)
- Hair color: Light brown
- Eye color: Blue
- Agency: Marilyn Agency (New York, Paris); Models 1 (London); Sight Management Studio (Barcelona); IMM Bruxelles (Brussels); UNIQUE DENMARK (Copenhagen); Modellink (Gothenburg); Mega Model Agency (Hamburg)

Caroline Corinth (born 20 July 1994) is a Danish model.

== Career ==
Corinth posed on adverts for Victoria's Secret, Pilgrim, Munthe plus Simonsen and Pieces. She also walked runways for Matthew Williamson, Malene Birger, J.Crew, Ohne Titel and Charlotte Ronson.

She has been featured on the cover of Qvest, Eurowoman, Elle, DV Mode, Marie Claire and Cover, as well as editorials, for S Moda for El País, Teen Vogue and Grazia.
