= Caroline Chomienne =

French film director (1957–2020)

- Born: 5 November 1957; Casablanca
- Died: 10 September 2020 (aged 62); Marseille
- Occupation: Film director

Caroline Chomienne (5 November 1957 – 10 September 2020) was a French film director and producer.

== Biography ==
Chomienne's first feature film which she directed was Les Surprises de l'amour, released in 1988. She was a member of the Collectif 50/50 association, which aims to promote equality between men and women in the film industry.

== Filmography ==
=== Short films ===
- Un tournage de Raul Ruiz (1983)
- Lettre à Ahmat (2001)
- Cours plus vite que la vie (2016)

=== Feature films ===
- Les Surprises de l'amour (1988)
- Des lendemains qui chantent (1996)
- Freestyle (2002)
- Antigone sans terre (2005)
- Véra (2016)
- La Leçon de danse (2018)
- Cuba no, Cuba si (2018)
