= Caroline O'Fallon =

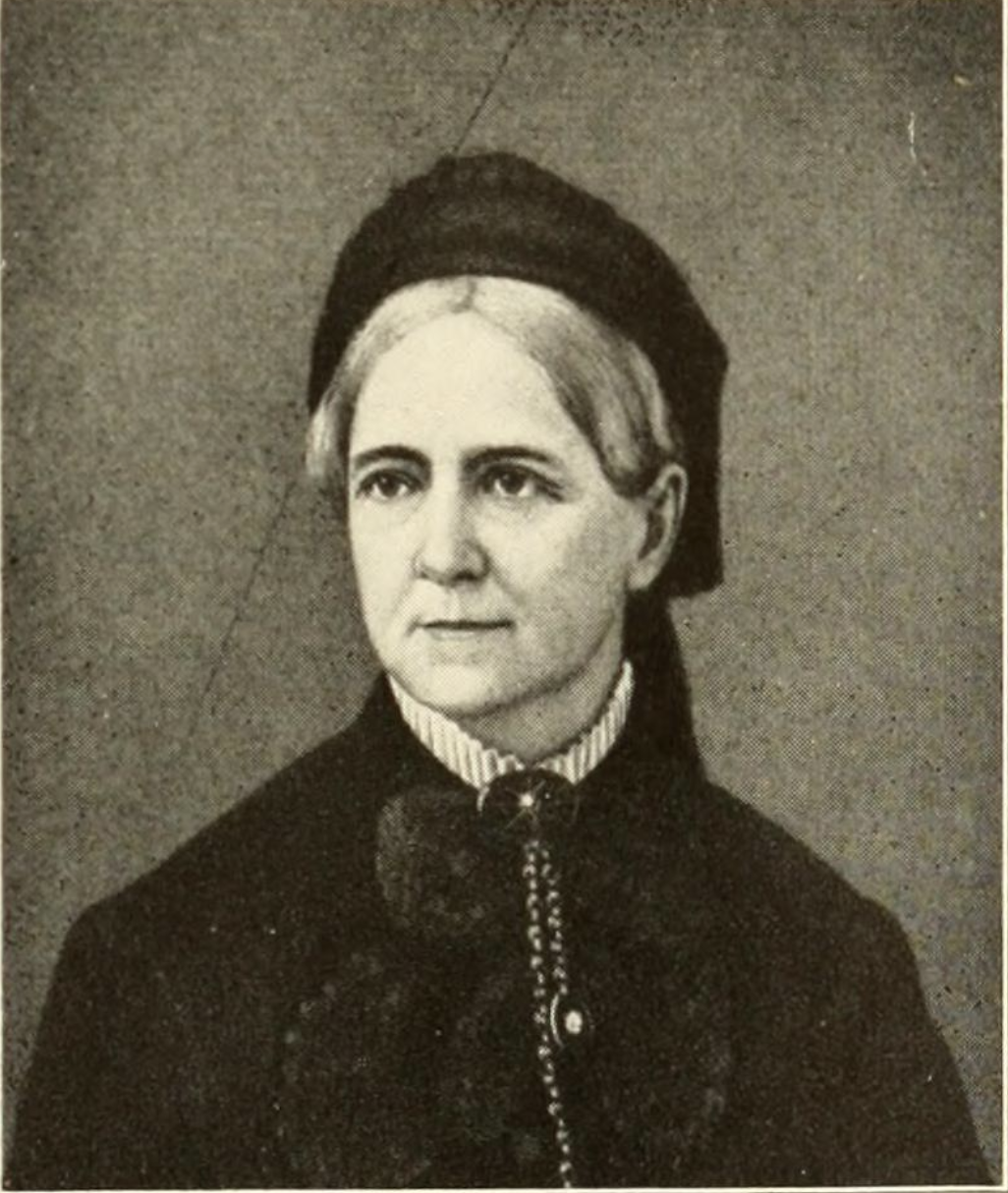
- Born: Ruth Caroline Schutz; 1804; Baltimore, Maryland, U.S.
- Died: September 24, 1898 (aged 93–94); St. Louis, Missouri, U.S.
- Occupations: Benefactor, philanthropist
- Spouse: John O'Fallon (m. 1827–1865)
- Children: 5

Caroline Schutz O'Fallon (1804–1898) was an American benefactor and philanthropist.

== Early life and education ==
Ruth Caroline Schutz was born in 1804, in Baltimore, Maryland. Her family members were wealthy merchants of that city.

She came of an old Maryland family, and some of her ancestors were closely related to English families of noble lineage. Her great-grandmother, Susanah Howard, was first cousin to the Cecilia Shirley, Lady De La Warr, Countess Delaware, wife of Thomas West, 3rd Baron De La Warr, first Colonial Governor and Captain-General of Virginia, in whose honor the State of Delaware was afterward named. She was reared in Maryland, carefully educated, and in her young womanhood was noted for both her beauty and her accomplishments.

In 1824, she accompanied her parents and a party of enterprising and adventurous people, who had determined to seek homes in the West, to St. Louis, Missouri. From Wheeling, Virginia, they drifted down the Ohio River to Louisville, Kentucky, in a boat of their own making. At Louisville, they abandoned this primitive craft and took passage on a boat called the Calhoun for St. Louis. Among those who came aboard this boat at Louisville were General William Clark and his family, with whom Miss Schutz and her parents became well acquainted on the voyage to St. Louis. When they landed at the St. Louis wharf, General Clark was greeted by a man of military bearing, whom he introduced to Miss Schutz as his nephew, Captain John O'Fallon. Captain -or, as he became known later, Colonel- O'Fallon was the first person she met in St. Louis.

== Career ==
On March 15, 1827, she married the widowed John O'Fallon. Her husband soon became a man of large wealth, and a public benefactor.

After his death, she made many benefactions from her own ample fortune. No one knew how great were her charitable donations. In the winter mornings, she would read the newspapers, then, calling h er coachman, she would give him US$10, US$15, or US$25, and pointing out the cases of destitution in the papers, would tell him to go to each place and find out what was needed and supply the wants, leaving no name.

Throughout her life, she was a benefactress of the Methodist Church, to which she belonged. She was a believer in education and helped many men through college. The Methodist ministers whom her money had educated reached into the scores.

Her nature was poetic, and her sentiments often found expression in verse, printed from time to time.

== Death ==
Caroline Schutz O'Fallon died in St. Louis, September 24, 1898. The couple had four sons, James, Benjamin, Henry, and John, and one daughter, Caroline.

Upon her death, Mrs. Ulysses S. Grant (nee Julia Dent, whose father was of Maryland birth), in a letter to Mrs. O'Fallon's family, stated that she owed to Mrs. O'Fallon the dress she wore upon her marriage to the President.
