= Murder of Caroline Crouch =

Woman murdered in Glyka Nera

Caroline Crouch
- Καρολάιν Κράουτς
- Caroline Crouch at age 19
- Born: Caroline Louise Crouch; 12 July 2001; Athens, Greece
- Died: 11 May 2021 (aged 19); Glyka Nera, Greece
- Cause of death: Strangulation
- Resting place: Alonnisos Cemetery; Alonnisos, Greece; 39.15151°N 23.84256°E (approximate)

Caroline Crouch (Greek: Καρολάιν Κράουτς; 12 July 2001 – 11 May 2021) was a Greek student of British and Filipino descent who was murdered on the morning of 11 May 2021, in her home on Glyka Nera, a suburb of Athens, Greece. 37 days later, her husband, Babis Anagnostopoulos, confessed to the police under interrogation that he was the one who murdered her. On 22 June, he was imprisoned on charges of murder and animal murder. The case was extensively covered by Greek and international media due to developments during its investigation.

== Caroline Crouch ==
Caroline Louise Crouch was born on 12 July 2001. She was the daughter of retired engineer David Crouch and his wife, Susan Dela Cuesta. Through her father, she held British citizenship. According to her father, Crouch was born in Athens, though her birthplace has also been reported as Liverpool.

At the age of 8 years old she moved with her family to the island of Alonnisos, where she grew up. When she was 15 years old, she met her future husband, Charalambos "Babis" Anagnostopoulos. They married on 15 July 2019, in Portugal.

== Murder ==
On May 11, 2021, Caroline was found dead on her bed by police officers who arrived at her house responding to a phone call made by her husband, who was found tied and gagged beside the bed. In the same room, the couple's daughter, Lydia, was found.

According to the initial statement given to the prosecuting authorities by her husband, a few hours after midnight (04:30), three hooded armed robbers entered the couple's residence through the basement window and killed the family dog by hanging it by its leash from the stair rail. They then went up to the loft where the couple's bedroom was located and demanded their money at gunpoint. The husband told the robbers that he had 10,000 euros and indicated to them the place where they would find the money. Caroline, who knew martial arts, fought back when the robbers pointed a gun at her baby. The leader of the robbers managed to immobilize her and then kill her by suffocating her. The robbers, before leaving the residence, tied and gagged the young woman's 33-year-old husband, who soon fainted. Police officers, during the first investigation they made inside the residence, found that the intruders had removed the memory card from the surveillance camera located on the ground floor of the residence.

== Investigation ==
The case was taken over by the Crimes Against Life Department of the Hellenic Police. A reward of 300,000 euros was offered for information leading to the capture of the robbers; the police condemned the brutality of the crime. During the first days of the investigations, a 43-year-old man, a citizen of Georgia, was arrested as he tried to cross the border into Bulgaria with a fake passport; however, no evidence connecting him with the case was found. During the investigation carried out at Crouch's residence, no traces of a breach of the window through which the robbers allegedly entered, nor any fingerprints or DNA traces from the perpetrators were found. The investigations of the prosecuting authorities continued with the search for the escape vehicle of the perpetrators, analyzing data from the security cameras that were present in nearby houses and shops in the area of Glyka Nera, without finding anything related to the case.

=== Findings ===
From the analysis of the digital evidence of both the victim and her husband (mobile phones, biometric watch, camera) it was found that there was a significant discrepancy in the times reported by Anagnostopoulos during his statement to the prosecuting authorities. In particular, the camera's memory card had been removed at 01:20 instead of 04:30, which according to Anagnostopoulos was the time the robbers entered the house. Crouch's biometric watch also showed her heart had stopped beating at 04:11. Finally, the analysis of the husband's mobile phone applications showed that some applications were running during the time he allegedly was bound and gagged.

== Arrest and trial ==
On 17 June, a police helicopter was sent to Alonissos where the victim's memorial service was being held. The police officers who went there informed the victim's husband that new important information had emerged in the case and urged him to follow them immediately to Athens. From Alonissos he was transferred to Skiathos, from where he left for Athens on a plane. After a long testimony to the General Police Directorate of Attica, and with the announcement of the findings, the husband confessed that he murdered Crouch, claiming that the cause of his act was the frequent frictions that existed between them. As for his attempt to divert the investigations by claiming the crime was a robbery, he attributed it to not wanting their 11-month-old child to grow up without either of her parents. On 18 June, the confessed perpetrator was charged with two felonies and two misdemeanors, namely, murder committed in a calm state of mind, animal abuse, false reporting, and false testimony, due to the statements he gave to the Prosecuting Authorities. On 16 May 2022, approximately one month after the start of the trial, the Joint Jury unanimously found Babis Anagnostopoulos guilty of murder committed in a calm state of mind, killing a companion animal, as well as the misdemeanors of false report and false testimony. He was sentenced to life imprisonment and an additional sentence of 10 years in prison for the execution of the family dog as well as a fine of 20 thousand euros. He was also sentenced to a total of 11 years and six months in prison, due to an additional sentence imposed on him for misleading the authorities. After an appeal by Anagnostopoulos, on September 29, 2023, the Mixed Court of Appeal in Athens unanimously affirmed the initial trial's verdict, which resulted in Babis Anagnostopoulos being re-sentenced to life imprisonment, an additional term of 11 years and 6 months, and a total fine of 21,000 euros. The Crouch family won custody of the couple's daughter, Lydia. She later moved to Manila, Philippines in order to be raised with her cousins.

== British impact ==
Because of Crouch's British background, the case of her murder attracted the attention of major British newspapers such as The Guardian as well as the Sky News and BBC News networks. The news networks Fr24 News (France) and Fox News (US) and the New York Post also reported on the case. On February 19, 2022, the British television channel Channel 5 aired the police procedural documentary Caroline: The Murder That Fooled the World, which focused on the solving of the case.
