= Caroline Bedell Thomas =

American cardiologist (1904–1997)

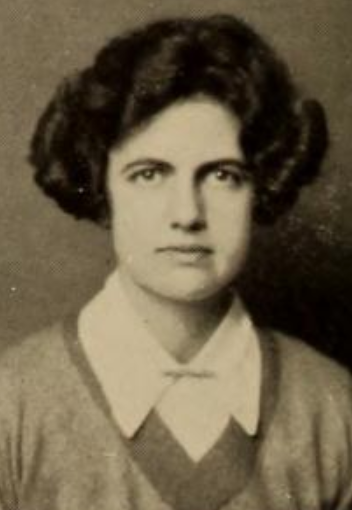
- Bedell in the 1925 Smith College yearbook
- Born: November 29, 1904
- Died: December 14, 1997 (aged 93)
- Occupation: Cardiologist

Caroline Cunningham Bedell Thomas (November 29, 1904– December 14, 1997) was an American cardiologist. She is considered a pioneer in the study of hypertension and preventive medicine. In 1970, Thomas became the Johns Hopkins School of Medicine third female full professor.

== Early life and education ==
Bedell was born on November 29, 1904, in Ithaca, New York to parents Mary Louise Crehore and Frederick Bedell. She graduated from Smith College in 1925 summa cum laude with a Bachelor of Arts degree before conducting her graduate work at Johns Hopkins University under the guidance of Herbert Spencer Jennings.

== Career ==
Bedell joined the faculty at Johns Hopkins University in 1930 as a house officer in their department of medicine. The following year, she was promoted to assistant professor of medicine at Johns Hopkins School of Medicine where she led studies in electrocardiography. As a result of her research, she was elected a Fellow of medicine with the National Research Council and a fellow in neuropathology at Harvard Medical School.

Bedell returned to Johns Hopkins School of Medicine as a faculty member following her Harvard fellowship in 1935. She also became a married woman to Dr. Henry M. Thomas, Jr, taking his last name. By 1936, while working with mice, she discovered that sulfanilamide could interrupt and prevent rheumatic heart disease and other infections. While working under mentor and department chair Warfield Theobald Longcope, she studied neurogenic models of hypertension and the effects sympathectomy has on blood pressure. Thomas simultaneously served as a physician at the Bryn Mawr School, a civilian consultant to the Army Surgeon General, and operated a private practice.

Longcope eventually encouraged Thomas to start an adult cardiac, where she conducted a longitudinal study of predictors of heart disease, cancer, and suicide called "the Precursors Study." Between the years of 1948 and 1964, Thomas conducted studies on 1,337 Johns Hopkins students and graduates, mostly made up of young, white males, in order to limit confounding factors. The original aim of the study was to determine precursors of heart disease by subjecting each participant to a series of physical exams and an 11-page questionnaire about eating and lifestyle habits, family history, and psychosocial characteristics. The results of her research found that of the males studied, those who developed coronary artery disease also had high cholesterol but not vice versa. She also found that graduates who suffered anxiety or depression as students were more likely to be fatigued and achieve lower academic standings. Thomas believed that physical diseases had genetic, environmental, psychological, and physiological components to them. This became the first longitudinal study used to determine predictors of heart disease, cancer, and suicide in youth. Prior to her retirement, Thomas published over 130 Precursors Study manuscripts in peer-reviewed journals. Future predictor studies such as the Framingham Heart Study, the Harvard Physicians Health Study, and the national Nurses Study have used her Precursors model as a guide.

Although the study became influential, Thomas had a difficult time maintaining its funds. She would often take less salary money or end the cohort enrollment early. Due to lack of funds, 1964 was the last cohort Thomas studied. She became desperate enough for funds that she would offer family heirlooms to donors in exchange for donations, although no one ever accepted. Prior to ending the study, she received the 1957 James D. Bruce Memorial Award for her work in preventive medicine. In June 1970, Thomas was promoted to the rank of Full Professor, the third female to do so. She maintained this role until her retirement in 1986 at the age of 82.

Thomas died on December 14, 1997, due to illness at Roland Park Place in Baltimore.
