= Caroline Donald =

British journalist

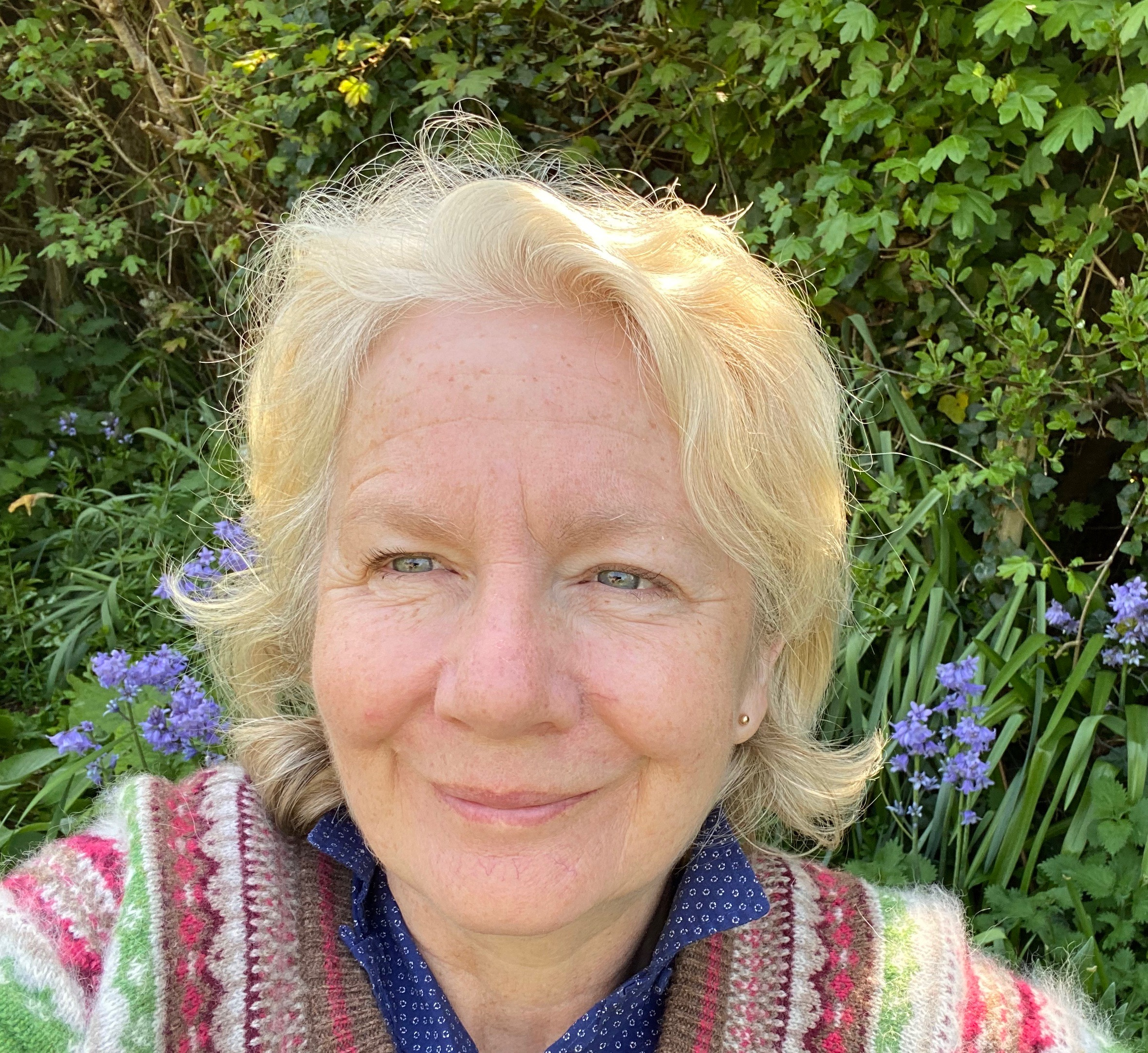
Caroline Donald, at home in Somerset

Caroline Donald is a British journalist and author, and was the gardening editor of The Sunday Times from 2000 to 2019.

Her book, The Generous Gardener: Private Paradises Shared, is a compilation of 43 articles or essays, primarily from The Sunday Times. Gardeners and their gardens covered include Jilly Cooper, Will Alsop, Henry Cecil, Corinne Bailey Rae, Jim Carter, Imelda Staunton, Christopher Gibbs, Natasha Spender, Penelope Hobhouse, Bob Flowerdew, Kelly Brook, and Roy Lancaster. It has been described as "a pick up and browse gem to lift the spirits and reinforce what we all know – that gardening is good for you!"

== Publications ==
- The Generous Gardener: Private Paradises Shared, Pimpernel Press, ISBN 978-1910258972
