= Caroline Brown Bourland =

American university teacher (1871–1956)

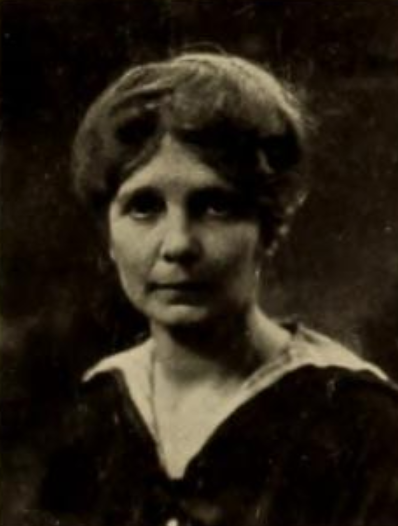
- Born: June 4, 1871; Peoria, Illinois
- Died: February 28, 1956 (aged 84); Oconomowoc, Wisconsin
- Education: Smith College (BA)
- Occupations: College professor, scholar of Spanish

Caroline Brown Bourland (June 4, 1871 – February 28, 1956) was an American college professor. She taught for over twenty years at Smith College, where she was instrumental in the progression of the Spanish department into its own department. Bourland was a respected Spanish scholar.

== Early life and education ==
She was born in Peoria, Illinois on June 4, 1871, to Benjamin P. and Clara (Parsons) Bourland. She was educated in France and Germany and attended high school in Peoria. In 1893, she graduated from Smith College, with a B.A. After graduation, she taught in several secondary schools until 1897. Bourland studied abroad at the Sorbonne and Collège de France, Paris, from 1897 to 1898. A fellow in Romance Languages from Bryn Mawr College, she graduated in 1899; and was a graduate scholar and fellow by courtesy in Romance Languages, from 1900. In 1901, Bourland was the holder of the Mary E. Garrett European fellowship and a student in Romance Languages, at Madrid, Spain. In 1905, she received her Ph.D. from Bryn Mawr. Her dissertation focused on Boccacio and his work The Decameron.

== Career ==
A teacher in Pueblo, Colorado, from 1893 to 1894. She was later a teacher of French and German in Mrs. Starrett's School, Oak Park, Illinois, 1895–96 and at a high school in Peoria, Illinois, from 1896 to 1897. Bourland was an instructor, from 1902 to 1906, and later an associate professor of Spanish and French from 1906 at Smith College, where she would serve until her retirement in 1939.

Bourland was instrumental in the progression of the Spanish department at Smith into its own department. At Smith College, she focused on short stories in Spain. Bourland orchestrated an exchange program between a school in Madrid and Smith, in the hopes that her American students would learn to love Spain as she did.

== Death and legacy ==
Bourland died on February 28, 1956, in Oconomowoc, Wisconsin. In reporting her death, the Hispanic Review described Bourland as "one of the most favorably known women in American Hispanism, a keen and articulate personality, a devoted educator and a distinguished scholar."

== Bibliography ==
Most widely held works by Caroline Brown Bourland:

- The short story in Spain in the seventeenth century, with a bibliography of the novela from 1576 to 1700 , 1927
- The case of Sancho de Almazán and Juan de la Cámara versus the Crown of Castile and the Town Council of Arenas (1514) , 1947
- The Guild of St. Ambrose, or Schoolmasters' Guild of Antwerp, 1529-1579, 1951
