= Caroline Girvan =

Personal trainer and fitness YouTuber in Northern Ireland

- Born: 22 June 1984 (age 41)
- Occupations: YouTuber; certified personal trainer; accountant

YouTube information
- Channel: Caroline Girvan
- Years active: 2020–present
- Genre: Fitness
- Subscribers: 4 million
- Views: 639 million
- Last updated: 26 March 2025
- Website: carolinegirvan.com

Caroline Girvan (born 22 June 1984) is a personal trainer and fitness YouTuber based in County Antrim, Northern Ireland. Girvan's videos are geared to building muscular strength and endurance.

Girvan started posting workouts on YouTube in April 2020, during the Coronavirus pandemic lockdown, in response to a request from one of her personal training clients. Girvan began a business as a personal trainer around 2014, seeing clients in her home gym. She had previously worked in accounting.

Girvan has said that she keeps the bulk of her material free, and that her biggest following "seems to be in the USA, the UK, Germany, India and Canada." In April 2023, Girvan launched her home workout app, CGX, which provides workout programs, science-backed health information, curated and nutrition resources.

Girvan has two children.
