= William Cocke Young =

American jurist and Army colonel (1812–1862)

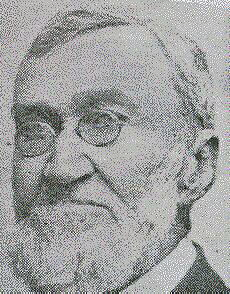
- Born: May 7, 1812; Davidson County, Tennessee, US
- Died: October 16, 1862 (aged 50) Cooke County, Texas, US
- Allegiance: Republic of Texas (1837–1846); United States (1846–1861); Confederate States of America (1861–1862)
- Branch: Army
- Rank: Colonel
- Wars/battles: American Indian Wars; Battle of Village Creek; American Civil War; Battle of Chustenahlah

Colonel William Cocke Young (May 7, 1812 – October 16, 1862) was an American jurist and Confederate States Army colonel.

== Biography ==
Young was born on May 7, 1812, in Davidson County, Tennessee, to Daniel Young and Peggy Branch. In 1837, he moved near Pecan Point, Texas. He served as the first sheriff of the county in 1837. On February 5, 1844, Sam Houston appointed him district attorney of the Republic of Texas' Seventh Judicial District.

Young served under Edward H. Tarrant in the Battle of Village Creek, and helped bury John B. Denton afterwards. He served as a representative from Red River County during the Convention of 1845, which resolved the Texas Revolution.

During the Mexican–American War, Young and James G. Bourland organized the 3rd Texas Cavalry Regiment, which Young served as colonel under. They and their army were sent into battle in August 1846.

In 1851, Young moved to Shawneetown, Illinois, where he practiced law for six years. In 1854, he and Charles Stanfield Taylor were appointed Land Commissioners to inspect land titles in West Texas counties, but Young declined the position. In 1856, the Texas Legislature named Young County, Texas in his honor.

On February 21, 1857, Congress divided the district for the Federal Court of Texas into an Eastern District of Texas and Western District of Texas. President Franklin Pierce appointed Young to the office of United States Marshal for the Western District of Texas on March 3, 1857. He served in this position until its expiration after four years.

During the American Civil War, after consulting with Jefferson Davis in Montgomery, Alabama, Young organized the 11th Texas Cavalry Regiment. In May 1861, he and his army crossed the Red River, stopping possible invasions from the north. He fell ill in 1862 and returned to his home in Cooke County, Texas, where he selected the jury to the trials of the Great Hanging at Gainesville.

During a hunting trip on October 16, 1862, Young was murdered. Following his death, nineteen more Unionists were hanged.
