= Beaulieu (surname) =

Beaulieu is a French surname. Notable people with the surname include:

== Art ==
- Antoine de Beaulieu (died 1663), French ballet dancer and noble
- Bradley Beaulieu, American author
- Christine Beaulieu, Canadian actress and playwright
- Claire Beaulieu (born 1955), Canadian artist
- Corey Beaulieu (born 1983), American musician
- Danielle Beaulieu, writer
- Derek Beaulieu (born 1973), Canadian poet, writer and publisher
- Désiré Beaulieu (1791–1863), French composer
- Eustorg de Beaulieu (c. 1495–1552), French poet, composer and pastor
- Geneviève Brossard de Beaulieu (fl. c. 1770–1815), French painter
- Geoffrey of Beaulieu (fl. 13th century), French monk and biographer
- Germaine Beaulieu (born 1949), Canadian poet and novelist
- Girard de Beaulieu (died after 1587), French singer, musician and composer
- Henri Beaulieu (1873–1953), French actor, theatre director and author
- Joseph Beaulieu (1895–1965), Canadian composer, folklorist and educator
- Marie-Hélène Beaulieu (born 1979), Canadian artist
- Michel Beaulieu (1941–1985), Canadian writer and poet
- Philippe Leroy-Beaulieu (1930–2024), French actor
- Philippine Leroy-Beaulieu (born 1963), French actress
- Priscilla Beaulieu Presley (born 1945), American actress, businesswoman and ex-wife of Elvis Presley
- Renée Beaulieu, Canadian director and screenwriter
- Trace Beaulieu (born 1958), American comedian, puppeteer, writer and actor
- Victor-Lévy Beaulieu (1945–2025), Canadian writer, playwright and editor

== Politics ==
- Antoine Treuille de Beaulieu (1809–1885), French general
- Augustin de Beaulieu (1589–1637), French general
- Bernard Thomas Tréhouart de Beaulieu (1754–1804), French businessman, naval officer and politician
- Catherine Beaulieu Bouvier Lamoureux (c. 1820–1918), Métis leader
- Edward Douglas-Scott-Montagu, 3rd Baron Montagu of Beaulieu (1926–2015), British politician and peer
- Emile Beaulieu (1931–2016), American politician
- François Beaulieu II (1771–1872), Métis guide, interpreter and chief of the Yellowknives
- Hubert Le Loup de Beaulieu (died 1799), French naval officer
- Jane Beaulieu, American politician
- Jean-Claude Beaulieu (born 1944), French politician
- Jean-Paul Beaulieu (1902–1976), Canadian politician and accountant
- Johann Peter de Beaulieu (1725–1819), Austrian general
- Mario Beaulieu (born 1959), Canadian politician and former party leader of the Bloc Quebecois
- Mario Beaulieu (senator) (1930–1998), Canadian politician and notary
- Martin Ruzé de Beaulieu (c. 1526–1613), French politician and noble
- Paul André Beaulieu, Canadian diplomat
- Roland Beaulieu (born 1944), Canadian politician
- Tom Beaulieu (born 1958), Canadian politician

== Sports ==
- Alex Beaulieu-Marchand (born 1994), Canadian freestyle skier
- André Beaulieu (born 1940), Canadian ice hockey player and coach
- Anne-Julie Beaulieu (born 1994), Canadian badminton player
- Antoine Gélinas-Beaulieu (born 1992), Canadian speed skater
- Jacques Beaulieu (ice hockey) (born 1968), Canadian ice hockey player
- Jason Beaulieu (born 1994), Canadian soccer player
- Jean-Christophe Beaulieu (born 1990), Canadian football player
- Jonathan Beaulieu (born 1993), French footballer
- Jonathan Beaulieu-Bourgault (born 1988), Canadian soccer player
- Jonathan Beaulieu-Richard (born 1988), Canadian football player
- Mélissa Citrini-Beaulieu (born 1995), Canadian diver
- Nathan Beaulieu (born 1992), Canadian ice hockey player

== Other ==
- Henri Leroy-Beaulieu (1842–1912), French publicist and historian
- Hugh of Beaulieu (died 1223), English bishop
- Frère Jacques Beaulieu (1651–1720), Dominican friar and travelling lithotomist
- Jacques Beaulieu (1932–2014), Canadian physicist
- Louis Beaulieu (1840–1866), French missionary and Roman Catholic martyr
- Luke de Beaulieu (died 1723), Anglo–French Huguenot exile and cleric
- Norman C. Beaulieu (born 1958), Canadian engineer and academic
- Olivier Freiherr von Beaulieu-Marconnay (1898–1918), German World War One flying ace
- Paul-Alain Beaulieu, Canadian historian and academic
- Pierre Paul Leroy-Beaulieu (1843–1916), French economist
- Sébastien Pontault de Beaulieu (1612–1674), French engineer and topographer

== See also ==
- Beaulieu (disambiguation)
- Étienne-Émile Baulieu (1926–2025), French biochemist and endocrinologist
- Bewley (disambiguation)
