= Beaulieu =

Beaulieu (English pronunciation: /ˈbjuːli/ BEW-lee; French pronunciation: [boljø]), from the French for "beautiful place", may refer to:

== Places ==
=== England ===
- Beaulieu, Hampshire, a village in the New Forest
- Beaulieu Abbey, located in Beaulieu, Hampshire
- Beaulieu Liberty, an obsolete district in Hampshire; see Liberty (division) § List of liberties
- Beaulieu Park railway station, Essex, opened in 2025.
- Beaulieu River, running through Beaulieu, Hampshire
- Beaulieu Road railway station, nearest station to Beaulieu, Hampshire
- Palace of Beaulieu, Essex, a former palace built by Henry VIII
- RAF Beaulieu, former RAF airfield located on Beaulieu Heath

=== France ===
- Beaulieu, Ardèche, in the Ardèche département
- Beaulieu, Calvados, in the Calvados département
- Beaulieu, Cantal, in the Cantal département
- Beaulieu, Côte-d'Or, in the Côte-d'Or département
- Beaulieu, Hérault, in the Hérault département
- Beaulieu, Indre, in the Indre département
- Beaulieu, Isère, in the Isère département
- Beaulieu, Haute-Loire, in the Haute-Loire département
- Beaulieu, Nièvre, in the Nièvre département
- Beaulieu, Orne, in the Orne département
- Beaulieu, Puy-de-Dôme, in the Puy-de-Dôme département
- Beaulieu-en-Argonne in the Meuse département
- Beaulieu-les-Fontaines in the Oise département
- Beaulieu-lès-Loches in the Indre-et-Loire département
- Beaulieu-sous-la-Roche, in the Vendée département
- Beaulieu-sous-Parthenay, in the Deux-Sèvres département
- Beaulieu-sur-Dordogne, in the Corrèze département
- Beaulieu-sur-Layon, in the Maine-et-Loire département
- Beaulieu-sur-Loire, in the Loiret département
- Beaulieu-sur-Mer, in the Alpes-Maritimes département
- Beaulieu-sur-Oudon, in the Mayenne département
- Beaulieu-sur-Sonnette, in the Charente département
- Château de Beaulieu, Saumur, in the Maine-et-Loire département

=== Switzerland ===
- Palais de Beaulieu, a convention centre in Lausanne
- Beaulieu Castle, in Lausanne

=== United States ===
- Beaulieu, Georgia
- Beaulieu, Minnesota
- Beaulieu House, Newport, an Astor (later Vanderbilt) home in Newport, Rhode Island
- Beaulieu Lake, a lake in Minnesota
- Beaulieu Township, Mahnomen County, Minnesota

=== Elsewhere ===
- Beaulieu metro station, Brussels, Belgium
- Beaulieu, or Lougheed House, a mansion in Calgary, Alberta, Canada
- Beaulieu House and Gardens, Drogheda, County Louth, Ireland
- The Beaulieu House, Sembawang Park, Singapore

== Companies ==
- Beaulieu (company), a French motion picture camera manufacturer
- Beaulieu International Group, a Belgian textile manufacturing group
- Beaulieu Vineyard, a winery in Rutherford, California

== Other uses ==
- Beaulieu (surname)
- Simca Beaulieu, a French car

== See also ==
- Beauly, a town in Inverness-shire, Scotland
