= Bewley =

Bewley may refer to:

== People ==
Bewley is a surname of English origin which may derive from the French name Beaulieu. Notable people with the surname include:

- Anthony Bewley (1804–1860), American abolitionist pastor lynched for his views
- Beulah Bewley (1929–2018), British physician
- Brett Bewley (born 1995), Australian footballer
- Carole A. Bewley, American scientist
- Charles Bewley (1888–1969), Irish diplomat
- Charlie Bewley (born 1981), British actor
- Edmund Thomas Bewley (1837–1908), Irish judge
- Janet Bewley (Wisconsin politician) (born 1951), American politician
- Lois Bewley (1934–2012), American dancer and choreographer
- Lydia Rose Bewley (born 1985), British actress
- Randall Bewley (1955–2009), American guitarist
- Sam Bewley (born 1987), New Zealand cyclist
- Susan Bewley, British obstetrician, daughter of Beulah
- Truman Bewley (born 1941), American economist
- William Bewley (physician) (1726–1783), British physician
- William Bewley (New York politician) (1878–1953), American politician
- William Fleming Bewley (1891–1976), English mycologist, phytopathologist, and horticulturalist

== Places ==
- Bewley Common, a hamlet in Wiltshire, England
- Cowpen Bewley, a village in Durham, England
- Newton Bewley, a village in Durham, England

== Other uses ==
- Bewley's, an Irish beverage company

== See also ==
- Beaulieu (disambiguation)
- Beauly
