= Buley =

Buley is a surname. Notable people with the surname include:

- E. C. Buley (1869–1933), Australian journalist and author
- Nidhi Buley (born 1986), Indian cricketer
- R. Carlyle Buley (1893–1968), American historian and educator

== See also ==
- Bewley (disambiguation)
- Ritchko-Buley
