= Richard Ellis (Texas politician) =

American judge (1781–1846)

Member of the Texas Senate from the 1st district
- In office October 3, 1836 – February 5, 1840
- Preceded by: Position Established
- Succeeded by: James G. Bourland

President of the Texas Constitutional Convention
- In office March 1, 1836 – March 17, 1836
- Preceded by: Position Established
- Succeeded by: Position Dissolved

Personal details
- Born: February 14, 1781 Lunenburg County, Virginia, US
- Died: December 20, 1846 (aged 65) Bowie County, Texas, US
- Resting place: Texas State Cemetery
- Spouse: Mary West Dandridge (m. 1806)
- Children: 4

Richard Ellis (February 14, 1781 – December 20, 1846) was an American plantation owner, politician, and judge on the Fifth Circuit Court of Alabama. He was president of the Convention of 1836 that declared Texas' independence from Mexico and he signed the Texas Declaration of Independence. Later, Ellis served in the Republic of Texas legislature.

== Early life and education ==
Ellis was born on February 14, 1781, likely in Lunenburg County, Virginia. After receiving a common-school education, he possibly attended college (although no record has survived). He studied law under the Richmond legal firm Wirt and Wickham and was admitted to the Virginia bar in 1806.

== Legal and political career ==
In 1817, Ellis moved to Alabama, settling first in Huntsville and then in Tuscumbia, where he practiced law and established a plantation. He was elected a delegate to Alabama's Constitutional Convention in 1818, which created the framework for the state’s admission to the Union. In 1819, he was elected judge of the Fifth Circuit Court, a position that also made him an associate justice of the Supreme Court of Alabama.

Ellis was known for his strict courtroom demeanor, earning a reputation for firm administration but also alienating some members of the bar with his rough manner. In 1829, he co-founded La Grange College in Franklin County, Alabama, and served on its first board of trustees.

=== Initial move to Texas ===
Ellis first visited Texas in 1826, attempting to collect a debt from a local colonel. That same year, he participated in an unsuccessful diplomatic mission alongside James Kerr and James Cummins to persuade Haden Edwards to abandon his rebellion against the Mexican government.

On February 22, 1834, Ellis moved to the disputed Red River region—claimed at various times by Mexico, Arkansas, and later the Republic of Texas—settling at Pecan Point in what is now Bowie County, Texas. In defiance of the Mexican immigration ban, he established a substantial cotton plantation and gained a reputation for his hospitality and refined estate.

Although he was selected as a delegate to the Arkansas Constitutional Convention of 1836, he declined due to ill health. Shortly thereafter, he was elected as one of six delegates from the Pecan Point area to the Texas Constitutional Convention.

=== President of the Texas Constitutional Convention ===
At the convention that opened on March 1, 1836, at Washington-on-the-Brazos, Ellis was unanimously elected president. The following day, he signed the Texas Declaration of Independence as presiding officer. While some contemporaries questioned his effectiveness as a moderator, he was widely recognized for his knowledge of parliamentary procedure and his calm, dignified leadership.

Most notably, Ellis presided over the convention for the seventeen days required to draft a constitution for the Republic of Texas.

== Later life ==
Following the convention, Ellis served as a senator in the Republic of Texas Congress, representing his district in the First through Fourth Congresses between October 1836 and February 1840. He retired from public life in 1840.

He married Mary West Dandridge on January 9, 1806. She was a cousin of both Martha Custis Washington and Dolley Madison. The couple had four children, including Nathaniel Dandridge Ellis, who also settled in Red River County and received a land grant as head of household.

== Death ==
Ellis died on December 20, 1846, at his residence in Bowie County, Texas. Although he had been in a "feeble situation" for several years, his death was sudden and unexpected. On the day of his death, his son, Nathaniel, who had been away from home for a number of weeks, had spent the entire day with him.

In the evening, while his son was out, Ellis arose from his bed, where he was thought to be asleep. Servants observed him walk into the passage and return to the room toward the fire. His clothes, which were made of "combustible materials", caught fire. Despite the immediate alarm and assistance rendered by his son and servants, his death was described as almost instantaneous.

He was originally buried on his plantation near New Boston, but in 1929, he and his wife's remains were reinterred in the Texas State Cemetery in Austin.

== Legacy ==
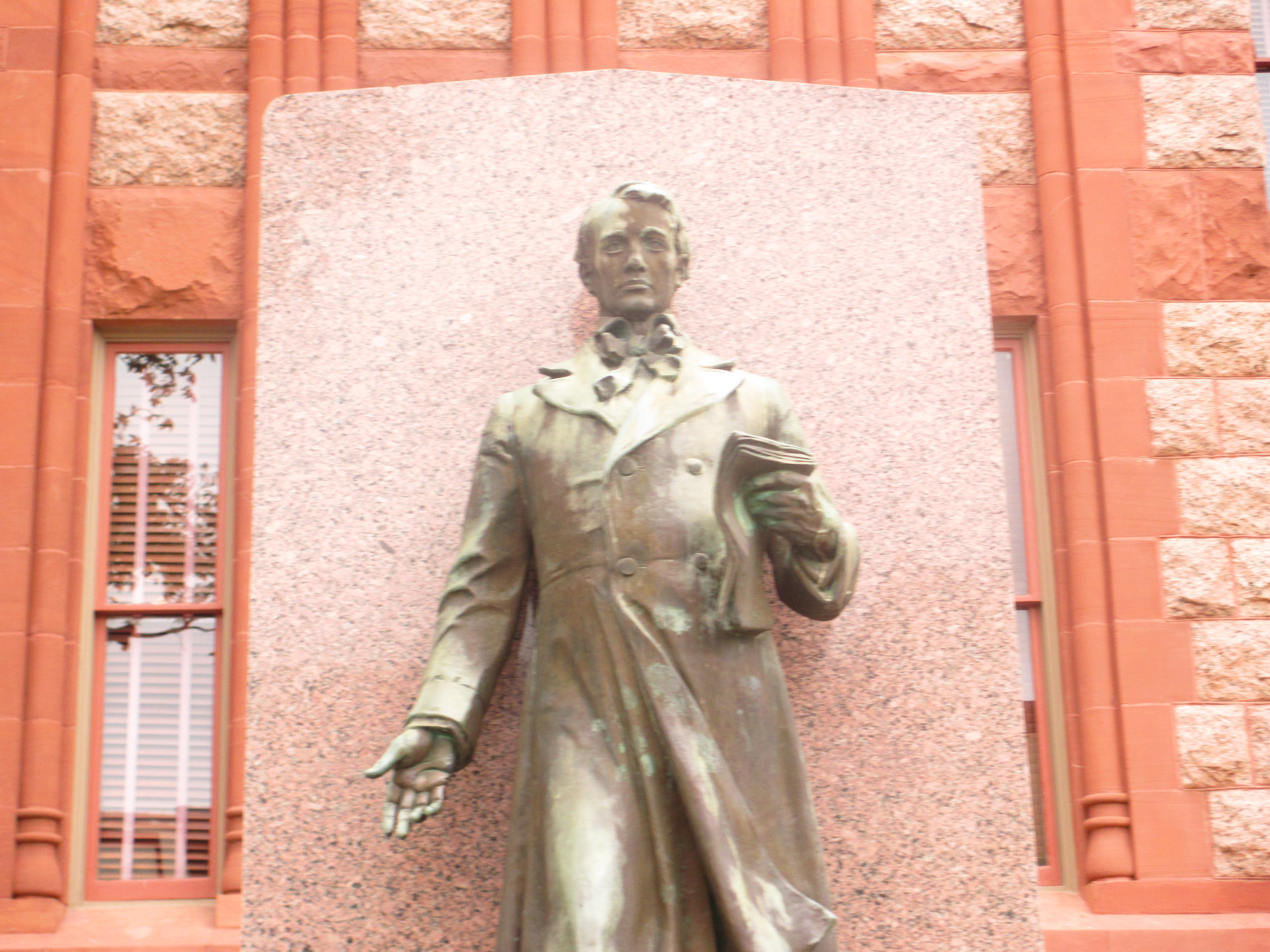
Richard Ellis statue at Ellis County Courthouse in Waxahachie, Texas

Ellis County, Texas, is likely named in his honor.
