= Great Hanging at Gainesville =

American Confederate war crime

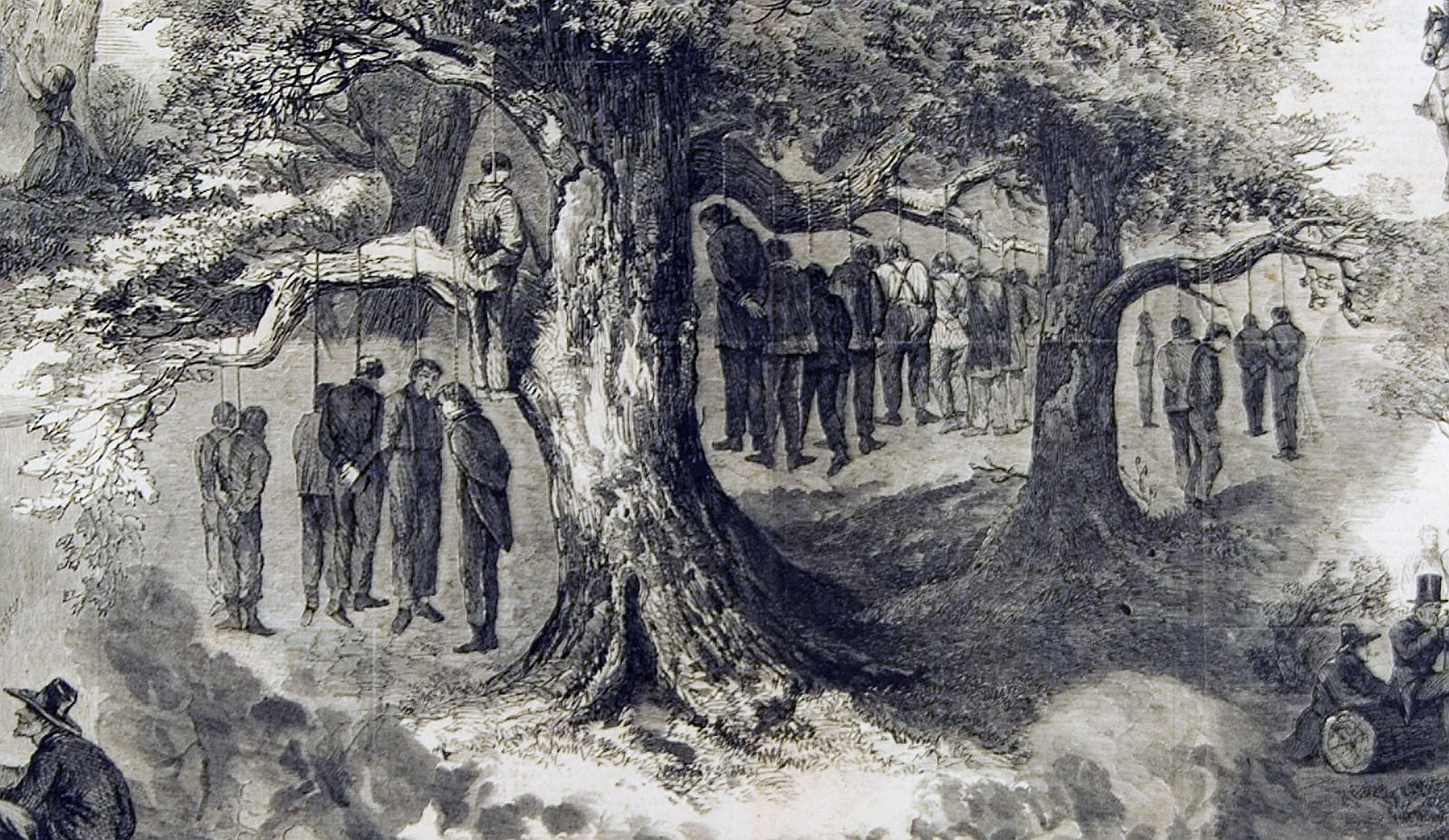
- Illustration from Frank Leslie's Illustrated Newspaper, 20 February 1864.
- Location: 33°37′49″N 97°8′25″W; Gainesville, Texas, US
- Date: October 1862
- Attack type: Mass execution Lynching
- Victims: 41 suspected Unionists

The Great Hanging at Gainesville was the execution by hanging of 41 suspected Unionists (men loyal to the United States) in Gainesville, Texas, in October 1862 during the American Civil War. Confederate troops shot two additional suspects trying to escape. Confederate troops captured and arrested some 150–200 men in and near Cooke County at a time when numerous North Texas citizens opposed the new law on conscription. Many suspects were tried by a "Citizens' Court" organized by a Confederate military officer. It made up its own rules for conviction and had no status under state law. Although only 11% of county households enslaved people, seven of the 12 men on the jury were slaveholders.

The suspects were executed one or two at a time. After several men had been convicted and executed, mob pressure built against the remaining suspects. The jury gave the mob 14 names, and these men were lynched without trial. After being acquitted, another 19 men were returned to court and convicted with no new evidence; they were hanged, all largely because of mob pressure. Most of the victims were Cooke County residents. This is claimed to have been the largest mass hanging in United States history. The Confederate and state courts ended the Citizens Court activities; President Davis dismissed General Paul Octave Hébert as military commander of the state, but Confederate military abuses continued in North Texas.

A privately organized, annual memorialization of the hangings has been held since 2007. The Cooke County Heritage Society planned a formal commemoration in 2012 to mark the 150th anniversary of the Great Hanging. They canceled it when the mayor objected, but a private event brought together descendants of several victims at a family reunion organized with speakers to discuss the event. In 2014, a memorial was erected near the execution site to commemorate the event and its victims.

== Background ==
Location of Gainesville in Cooke County, Texas

Cooke County, located in the region of North Texas and along the border with the U.S. State of Oklahoma, was organized in 1848. Its seat, Gainesville, was founded in 1850 and became the county seat on 26 January 1854. Colonization of North Texas began in 1841, when William S. Peters and a group of Anglo-American investors opened an empresario contract with the Republic of Texas. Settlement was slow and, like in most of the Antebellum South, marked by violent vigilantism. In what became known as the Hedgcoxe War, colonists dissatisfied with Peters expelled his agent, Henry O. Hedgcoxe, in July 1852. The arrival in Gainesville of the Butterfield Overland mail route, following a trail surveyed by U.S. Army Captain Randolph B. Marcy in 1849, in 1858, brought a rapid rise in Cooke County's population from 220 people in 1850 to 3,760 in 1860.

Nearly two-thirds of the 421,294 free citizens of Texas, as counted in the 1860 Census, were born outside of Texas. The majority of Texans came from the Upper South, but slaveholding Lower Southerners were pre-eminent and disproportionately represented in Texas's government. The production of cotton, which had exploded over seven-fold in Texas over the 1850s, made enslavers rich and connected the state's leaders to the future Confederacy. Cooke County had a similar transition of power, while its population remained overwhelmingly non-enslaving. By 1860, only 10.9% of Cooke County households enslaved people. (Note: Enslavers living in Cooke County did not grow cotton, as the constant clogging of the Red River by debris and lack of railways prevented its reaching any market. Enslavers instead dominated the production of goods sold locally. The 74 enslaving families in Cooke County collectively held 369 enslaved people by 1860.) Among them were the county's chief justice, sheriff, and three of the four county commissioners. Other important enslavers were Daniel Montague and James G. Bourland, a former Texas state senator, and James W. Throckmorton, a member of the Texas Legislature who was central to the settlement with Peters in 1853. Enslavers also controlled the volunteer state militias and often led them on expeditions against nearby Native Americans raiding Cooke and other North Texas counties. Extralegal violence against Natives, suspected white collaborators, and abolitionists was commonplace and cyclical.

New arrivals from the Butterfield Overland route were abolitionists or suspected of abolitionism. Among the former were Methodist preachers who vigilantes violently repressed. When a series of fires caused significant damage to North Texas, (Note: Phosphorus matches, which had made their first appearance in Dallas that summer, were put forward as a cause of the fire. Summary testing of this hypothesis found it wanting.) tensions flared and then exploded into violence that resulted in three slaves hanged in Dallas, a Methodist minister by the name of Anthony Bewley lynched, a hundred others whipped, and many free Northern Texans who had not already murdered or chased out of Texas by vigilantes. Despite growing secessionism in Texas, Cooke County increasingly cast its lot against the incumbent Southern Democrats. Nearby U.S. Army forts, which did business with North Texan enslavers, protected against Native American raids. Cooke County residents, furthermore, did not have an economic dependence on slavery and were unwilling to sacrifice their security to defend it. In the 1859 gubernatorial elections, 73% of Cooke County residents voted for Unionist Sam Houston, who downplayed the fires and posed himself as a moderate against Democrat Hardin Runnels, whose border security policies Houston decried as a failure. As in the rest of the antebellum South, however, John Brown's raid on Harpers Ferry and the election of Abraham Lincoln as President of the United States eliminated backlash against secession in Texas. In North Texas, enslavers began holding secessionist rallies in late 1860, though the sentiment was not unanimous in Cooke County nor the governments of Texas and the United States. The January 1861 session of the Texas Legislature overwhelmingly voted in favor of secession, to which Throckmorton was a leading opponent. A referendum, marred with secessionist violence and intimidation, was held in February; 61% of Cooke County votes were for staying in the United States, making it one of 18 of 122 Texas counties to vote against secession.

Texas seceded from the United States on 4 March 1861. When Governor Sam Houston refused to pledge allegiance to the Confederate States of America, he was deposed and replaced by the Lieutenant Governor Edward Clark. With secession, North Texans left the state by the hundreds for free soil. This exodus gave Confederate officials and supporters the false belief that opposition to secession in North Texas had "vanished", as was reported in The Times-Picayune, in New Orleans. Discontent with the Confederacy had grown in the region with the arrival of refugees from other areas of the Confederacy. Many of these were men fleeing conscription and thereby contributing to a feeling of cynicism and suspicion settling over North Texas. Many more were enslaved people, whose enslavers only made up a third of the free refugees. (Note: In 1860, 340 enslaved people were on the books for Cooke County. In 1862, around 500 were listed, and this remained the case until the end of the Civil War.) Confederate policies exacerbated that discontent. The Sequestration Act of 1861 called for the seizure and sale of the property of "alien enemies" and those who aided them. This was to fund the Richmond government, but the lion's share of procured funds in North Texas were absorbed by the local authorities. War taxes — in effect a year before they were law in the Confederacy — and impressment of local firearms and men were hated, but the most offensive was conscription, passed on 16 April 1862.

In April, 30 men of Cooke County formed a Union League and signed a petition to Richmond objecting to the government's policy of exempting large enslavers from the draft. A "Peace Party" was still active, although the state had joined the Confederacy. Its members pledged to resist Confederate conscription. Area enslavers claimed to fear that the group was colluding with pro-U.S. forces from out of state and notified local authorities about the incidents.

== Trials, executions, and lynchings ==
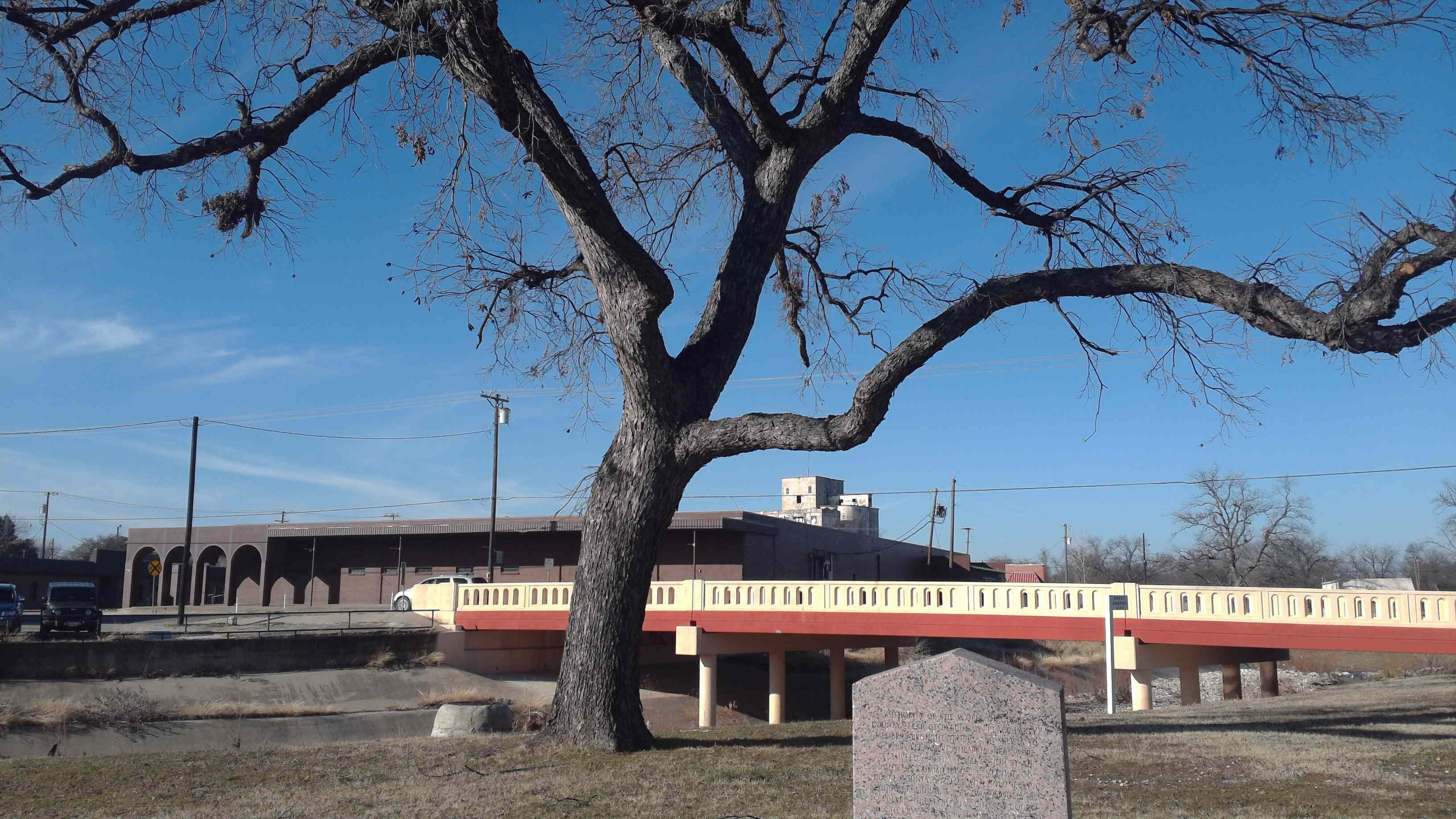
Site of the Great Hanging, 2016

On the morning of 1 October 1862, state troops led by the local provost, Colonel James G. Bourland, began arresting suspected Unionists in the area. Some 150 men were arrested in 13 days. Nearly 200 were ultimately arrested.

Bourland appointed Col. William Cocke Young, a major slaveholder, to appoint a jury. He formed a "Citizens Court" of 12 jurors (seven were slaveholders) in Gainesville, the county seat. This "court" had no legal status in Texas law. Bourland and Young together had reason to want to suppress dissent, as they owned about one-quarter of all enslaved people in the county.

The jury began trying the suspects for insurrection and treason, with conviction by a simple majority vote. After eight convictions, the jury decided to require a two-thirds majority vote for conviction. This resulted in the reversal of the last conviction. Those convicted were sentenced to be hanged within two days. Some were executed within hours.

After the jury acquitted several men, a mob threatened to lynch all of the remaining prisoners. The head of the jury gave them 14 names. These men were taken from jail and, without the benefit of any trial, were lynched on October 12 and 13. The court adjourned.

On 16 October, Colonel William Cocke Young, who some say had attempted to moderate the proceedings, was killed while pursuing a group who had killed another man along a creek. Young's death resulted in public outrage, as some feared abolitionists had killed him. Two jurors who had left were replaced on the jury by hard-line Confederates. The jury reversed the acquittals of 19 prisoners although hearing no new evidence. They convicted the men and sentenced them to death. These 19 were hanged, with their executions supervised by Capt. Jim Young, the colonel's son. The court released 50 to 60 men before Confederate and state courts finally halted its activities. A total of 41 men had been hanged in Gainesville in October 1862, and at least three others were shot to death. They left "42 widows and about 300 children."

== Reaction ==
Texas newspapers and Governor Francis Richard Lubbock praised the hangings. Pressure increased on dissenters in the state, and the military was responsible for more deaths. Northern newspapers treated the events at Gainesville as an outrage when they learned of them later.

President Jefferson Davis remained silent, having already dismissed General Paul Octave Hébert on 10 October as military commander of Texas for his imposition of martial law and harsh measures in enforcing conscription. Confederate law did not punish men who failed to report for the draft. Davis felt Hébert did not sufficiently control local commanders and provosts and had allowed military atrocities to take place. He appointed General John Bankhead Magruder to try to bring the state under control.

Troubles continued in North Texas, though, with hundreds of families fleeing the state to escape the violence and chaos. "Military commanders alternately helped lynch mobs or tried to quell them." In Decatur, Capt. John Hill supervised the hanging of five men. A group of men was arrested in Sherman, Texas, but Brig. Gen. James W. Throckmorton intervened and saved all but five who had already been lynched. In Sherman, E. Junius Foster, the editor of the Sherman Patriot, was murdered by Capt. Jim Young, the son of the late Col. Young, for publicly "applauding the death of his father." In Denton, another partisan shot a prisoner dead.

== Legacy ==
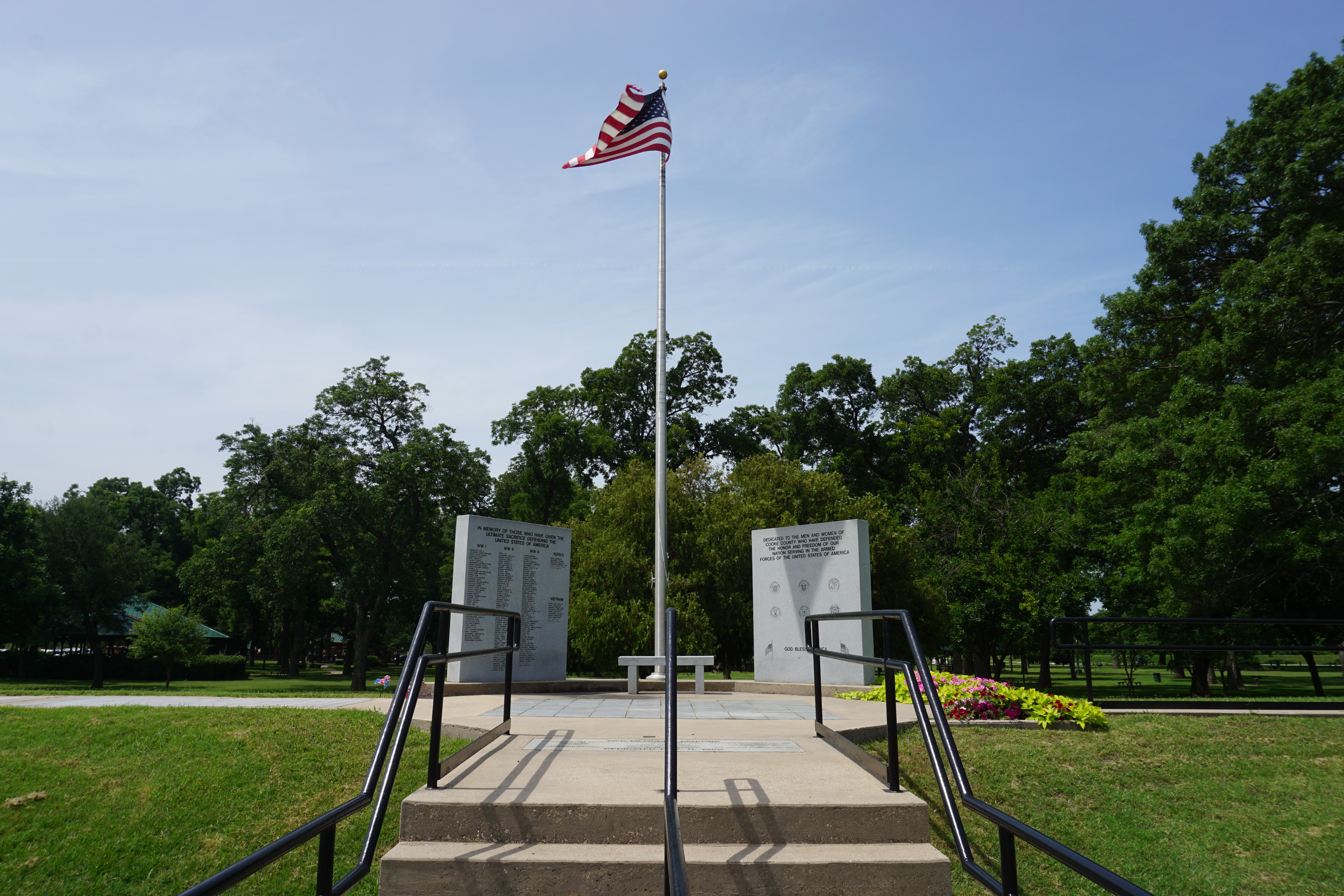
Gainesville War Memorial, Leonard Park

A state historical marker erected by the Texas Historical Commission in 1964, during the Civil War centennial commemorations, defends the arrest and execution of these 42 men. It claims the "Peace Party" had "sworn to destroy their government, kill their leaders, and bring in federal troops." The speediness of the trial is defended as necessary due to "fears of rescue." This narrative is known to have been based on incomplete material, as records had been lost or misplaced.

Controversy about the event has continued in the 21st century. Gainesville, a city of 16,000, was named in 2012 by Rand McNally as "the most patriotic small town in America". That year, the Cooke County Heritage Society planned an October event in Gainesville to mark the 150th anniversary of the Great Hanging as part of Civil War history. It was canceled after the mayor objected to marketing it. The city provides funding to the society's museum, and directors feared losing support. Instead, the mayor wanted to emphasize the city's new "patriotic" status and the annual Depot Days. Descendants of the victims were angry that the event would not be acknowledged. A member of the Cooke County Heritage Society said, "Gainesville has been hiding from the Great Hanging since it happened."

Colleen Carri, a heritage society board member, combined the commemoration with the annual Clark family reunion planned for 13 October. She expected 220 attendees, including descendants of six other hanging victims. They called the event "Remembering Our Past, Embracing Our Future." Richard B. McCaslin, a history professor at the University of North Texas, was scheduled as a speaker at the event. He wrote Tainted Breeze: The Great Hanging at Gainesville, Texas 1862 (1994), considered the "first comprehensive study" of this event.

At the same time, members of the local chapter of Sons of Confederate Veterans, who include some descendants of hanged men, had created a video, Black October 1862. They said some victims were not innocent but "traitors" for passing information to the enemy. McCaslin says no evidence was found of such activities. The SCV planned to screen their film on 13 October 2012 at the Masonic Lodge in Gainesville.

Some people in the city have led annual commemorations since 2007. A memorial for the victims of the Great Hangings was privately constructed in 2014. Consisting of two 5- x 6-ft granite slabs, it was installed at a small park, which had been donated to the city near the site of the hangings. One slab is inscribed with the names of the 42 victims; the other gives a full account of events, based on documented history.

== Literary portrayal ==
The great hanging features in a semi-biographical 2019 novel by Russ Brown titled Miss Chisum, which documents cattle baron John Simpson Chisum's life. The chapter is used to test Chisum's humanitarian faith, which was instilled in him as a member of the Odd Fellows. Chisum's ranch house was just 17 miles from the hanging.

== See also ==
- Marais des Cygnes massacre on 19 May 1858, near Trading Post, Kansas
- Nueces massacre on 10 August 1862, in Kinney County, Texas
- Shelton Laurel massacre on 18 January 1863, in Madison County, North Carolina
