= Chief Township, Mahnomen County, Minnesota =

Chief Township, Minnesota
- Township
- Location of Chief Township, within Mahnomen County, Minnesota

- Location within the state of Minnesota Chief Township, Minnesota (the United States)
- Coordinates: 47°20′47″N 95°50′41″W
- Country: United States
- State: Minnesota
- County: Mahnomen

Area
  - Total: 36.1 sq mi (93.6 km^{2})
  - Land: 34.6 sq mi (89.7 km^{2})
  - Water: 1.5 sq mi (3.9 km^{2})
- Elevation: 1,250 ft (381 m)

Population (2020)
  - Total: 176
  - Density: 5.08/sq mi (1.96/km^{2})
- Time zone: UTC-6 (Central (CST))
  - Summer (DST): UTC-5 (CDT)
- FIPS code: 27-11314
- GNIS feature ID: 0663795

Chief Township is a township in Mahnomen County, Minnesota, United States. The population was 176 at the 2020 census. It contains part of the census-designated place of Beaulieu.

Chief Township was named for an Ojibwe chieftain.

== Geography ==
According to the United States Census Bureau, the township has a total area of 36.2 square miles (94 km^{2}), of which 34.6 square miles (90 km^{2}) of it is land and 1.5 square miles (3.9 km^{2}) of it (4.18%) is water.

== Demographics ==
As of the census of 2000, there were 132 people, 48 households, and 37 families residing in the township. The population density was 3.8 inhabitants per square mile (1.5/km^{2}). There were 55 housing units at an average density of 1.6 per square mile (0.62/km^{2}). The racial makeup of the township was 85.61% White, 8.33% Native American, and 6.06% from two or more races.

There were 48 households, out of which 31.3% had children under the age of 18 living with them, 64.6% were married couples living together, 6.3% had a female householder with no husband present, and 22.9% were non-families. 20.8% of all households were made up of individuals, and 8.3% had someone living alone who was 65 years of age or older. The average household size was 2.75 and the average family size was 3.16.

In the township the population was spread out, with 29.5% under the age of 18, 6.8% from 18 to 24, 25.0% from 25 to 44, 19.7% from 45 to 64, and 18.9% who were 65 years of age or older. The median age was 40 years. For every 100 females, there were 123.7 males. For every 100 females age 18 and over, there were 126.8 males.

The median income for a household in the township was $29,792, and the median income for a family was $31,250. Males had a median income of $27,250 versus $26,250 for females. The per capita income for the township was $11,825. There were 11.1% of families and 15.2% of the population living below the poverty line, including 14.3% of under eighteens and 10.5% of those over 64.
