= Bird's Fort, Texas =

- Fort – Garrison
- Location within Texas
- Coordinates: 32°47′56″N 97°5′0″W
- Country: United States
- State: Texas
- County: Tarrant
- Built: 1841
- Founder: Major Jonathan Bird, Fourth Brigade of Texas Militia
- Elevation: 485 ft (148 m)
- Time zone: UTC-6 (CST)

Bird's Fort was a community north of present-day Arlington, Texas, United States. In 1841, when John Neely Bryan established Dallas, he invited the settlers at Bird's Fort to come live in his proposed city.

== History ==
The site was named for Major Jonathan Bird, who established a fort there in September 1841 along the Trinity River, for protection of the settlements along the Texas frontier. The garrison was constructed after the battle of Village Creek which occurred on May 24, 1841. Bird's Fort was occupied until March 1842, when the garrison was abandoned due to the threat of a Comanche attack.

The military installation was the site of the 1843 treaty negotiations between tribal Indians and Anglo settlements in the Red River counties.

On August 6, 1843, the ill-fated Snively Expedition was disbanded at Bird's Fort.

Bird's Fort was recognized as a Texas historic site in 1936.

== County development ==
Birdville, Texas, (in present-day Haltom City) was the first settlement in Tarrant County and was named after Bird's Fort.

== See also ==
- Treaty of Bird's Fort
