= Thomas Bewley =

British and Irish psychiatrist (1926–2022)

Thomas Henry Bewley CBE (8 July 1926 – 26 June 2022) was a British and Irish psychiatrist who specialised in the treatment of addiction disorders. He was president of the Royal College of Psychiatrists from 1984 to 1987.

== Early life and career ==
Bewley was born in Dublin, Ireland on 8 July 1926, into a Quaker family with a strong medical tradition. The Bewley family were well established in Dublin and among many other things established the well-known Bewley's cafes. He attended the School of Medicine (Trinity College Dublin), 1944–1950. After graduation he was appointed a Senior House Officer at St Patrick's Hospital, a major psychiatric hospital in Dublin. He then moved to London and spent short periods at various hospitals before taking up a post at the Maudsley Hospital. He then spent a year in Cincinnati and when he returned in 1960 took up a post at Tooting Bec Hospital and gained the position of consultant the following year.

Bewley was actively involved in the Royal College of Psychiatrists and was elected its Dean and then President in 1987. He wrote a history of the Royal College of Psychiatrists entitled Madness to Mental Illness.

Bewley's portrait hangs in the Royal College of Psychiatrists, Prescot Street, London. It was painted by Prof. David Tindle RA in 1988.

== Personal life and death ==
While at St. Patrick's Hospital in Dublin, he met a young medical student called Beulah Knox. They married in 1955 and had five children. Their daughter Susan is Professor of Obstetrics & Women's Health at King's College London. Beulah died in 2018.

Bewley died in Wimbledon, London on 26 June 2022, aged 95.
