= Battle of Village Creek =

1841 battle of the American Indian Wars

- Part of the Indian Wars
Date	May 24, 1841
Location	Arlington, Texas 32°43′19″N 97°11′6″W
Result	Texan victory

Belligerents
Republic of Texas Militia	Caddo; Cherokee; Tonkawa

Commanders and leaders
Edward H. Tarrant; John B. Denton †; Henry B. Stout; James G. Bourland	

Strength
~70	1,000 warriors

Casualties and losses
1 killed; 2 wounded	12 killed; significant number of Village Creek inhabitants wounded
- Location within Texas

The Battle of Village Creek, also known as the Village Creek Massacre, occurred on May 24, 1841, on the embankments of Village Creek in what was then the Republic of Texas. The site of the massacre is now located in Tarrant County, Texas, named for Edward H. Tarrant, who commanded the Texan forces in the massacre. Tarrant rallied a volunteer militia of 69 men, including Captain John B. Denton, who would be the Texans’ only fatality and who would also go on to have a North Texas county bear his name. The Texans used information from a Native American man they had captured to locate the villages, after which they launched a surprise attack which evolved into a running gunfight between the Republic of Texas militia and the Cherokee, Muscogee/Creek, Seminole, Waco, Caddo, Kickapoo, Tonkawa, Wichita, Shawnee, and Anadarko villagers who inhabited Village Creek. Texans used the occurrence of increased Native American raids on Anglo settlements in the Red River counties as justification for the massacre, which was a part of the larger pattern in the Republic of Texas, under the leadership of President Mirabeau B. Lamar, to wage an “exterminating war” on Native peoples, calling for “their total extinction or total expulsion.”

== Village Creek ==
The Village Creek area is a stem of the West Fork Trinity River. The stream originates near Cross Timber, Texas, then flows northeast through Arlington, Texas, (including through Lake Arlington, constructed in 1956, beneath which much of the original site of the massacre now lies) before joining the West Fork Trinity River.

A tributary of the Trinity River, Village Creek extends 23 miles to the south of the West Fork Trinity River, in Texas’s blackland prairie and cross timbers ecosystems, where dense stands of timber surrounded the waterway at the time of the massacre. Members of several tribes, including Muscogees/Creeks, Seminoles, Wacos, Kickapoos, Wichitas, Shawnees, Nadacos/Anadarkoes, Caddos, Cherokees, and Tonkawas, many of whom had fled or been forcibly displaced from their native homelands by prior waves of white settlement (see Indian Removal), inhabited a series of villages along the banks of Village Creek, which provided them with a dense, forested shelter between white-dominated lands in the eastern part of Texas and Comanchería in the west.

== Village Creek conflict ==
On May 14, 1841, General Edward H. Tarrant organized a company of about 70 volunteers from the Red River counties at Fort Johnston. The Republic of Texas militia had scouting detachments which were commanded by Captains John B. Denton, Henry B. Stout, and James G. Bourland.

During the morning hours of May 24, 1841, the militia force encroached the Village Creek area from the south in the vicinity of Cross Timber, Texas. After capturing a native inhabitant who provided locations of the area villages, Captains Denton, Stout, and Bourland led scouting units north toward the West Fork Trinity River. The militia volunteers carried out the command of burning huts along the creek banks.

As the scouting detachments progressed north, the command encountered larger villages and an increasingly stronger tribal force. Captains Denton and Stout were wounded near thickets bordering the Trinity River. Captain Denton was the only fatality, while Captain Stout and Captain Griffith were wounded.

The Village Creek tribes had twelve fatalities, while many of the inhabitants were wounded during the conflict.

Upon learning from prisoners that the valley contained over 1,000 warriors, General Tarrant recognized his militia was heavily outnumbered [1]. Following the death of Captain Denton and the wounding of others, Tarrant ordered an immediate retreat as the Texan force was routed by the fierce counter-attack [1]. For more information, visit the Texas State Historical Association (TSHA) Handbook.

== Bird's Fort treaty ==
On September 29, 1843, the Treaty of Bird's Fort was agreed upon at Fort Bird between the Village Creek tribes and the Republic of Texas, which opened the Red River counties for settlement by frontier pioneers.

== Archeological research ==
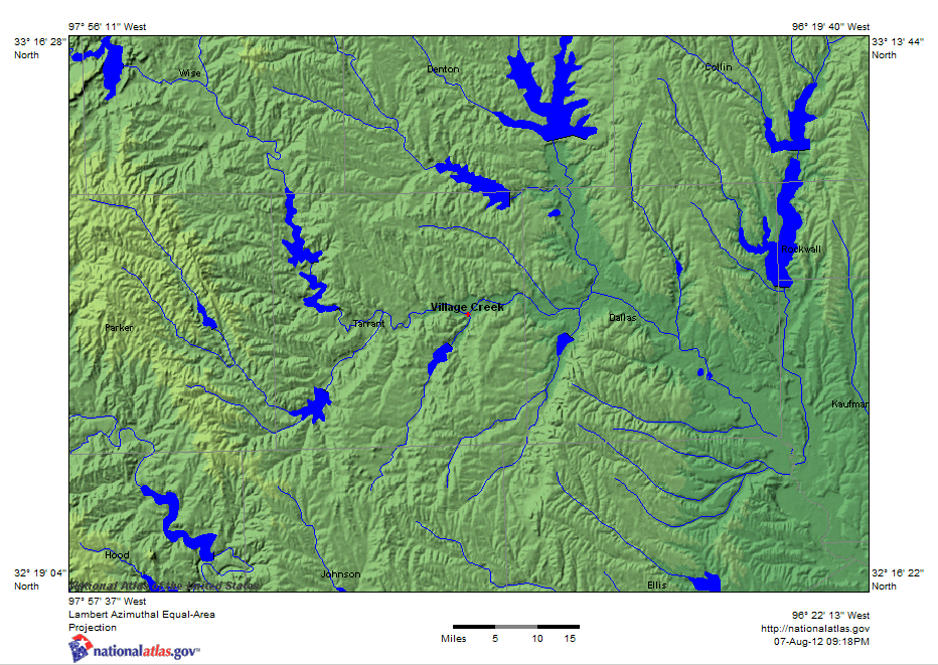
Village Creek in east Tarrant county

Archeological excavations have been conducted within the Village Creek area. Prehistoric artifacts have been discovered which date back around 9000 years, indicating a culture of food-gatherers, hunters, and village inhabitants.

Today, much of the Village Creek conflict site is beneath Lake Arlington, which has a surface area of 1,939 acres and was impounded in 1957.

== Historical record ==
The Village Creek battlefield received a historic marker in 1936.

The Village Creek area was recognized as an archeological site and received a historic marker in 1980.
