= Littleton Fowler (minister) =

American Methodist minister

- Born: 12 September 1803; Smith County, Tennessee, U.S.
- Died: 29 January 1846 (aged 42)
- Resting place: McMahan's Chapel, Texas
- Occupation: Methodist minister
- Spouse: Missouri M. Lockwood Porter
- Children: 2

Littleton Fowler (12 September 1803 – 29 January 1847) was an American Methodist Episcopal clergyman and circuit rider active mainly in Texas, where he built churches and organized congregations. He arranged for McMahan's Chapel to be built, which is sometimes cited as the first Protestant church in Texas. He served as Grand Chaplain of the Grand Lodge of Texas and was elected the first Chaplain of the Texas Senate during its independence. He is sometimes remembered by his nickname, the Saint of the Saddlebags.

== Early life ==
Fowler was born on 12 September 1803, son of Godfrey and Clara Wright Fowler in Smith County, Tennessee. In 1806 they moved to Caldwell County, Kentucky. He had at least four brothers, three of whom would arrive in Texas before him, and one who would follow him into Texas. Littleton had little formal education and was mostly self-taught. Later, he would be regarded as very well-read. He converted to Methodism at 16 and was licensed to preach in 1823.

== Career ==
McMahan's Chapel in 1929

He was admitted to the Kentucky Conference in 1826, before joining the Tennessee Conference in 1832, where he served as an agent of LaGrange College in Alabama. Shortly thereafter the Alabama Conference was formed and Fowler remained in that conference. In 1837, a call reached Alabama for Methodists to go out to Texas, which had just concluded its revolution. Fowler volunteered, and after a sickness, he left with Robert Alexander and Martin Ruter. Having also recruited John B. Denton, the party arrived from Louisiana. Fowler preached for four nights in San Augustine and raised money and resources necessary for a church in the area. Ruter gave him the responsibility of East Texas and Houston. As one of the first ministers in the state, he was made the first Chaplain of the Senate after his arrival in Houston that November. Fowler was shocked by the conduct of the Texan leaders, one incident he recorded in a journal including his associates stripping to their underwear, drinking, and using profanity while on a steamboat.

He laid the cornerstone of the church in San Augustine, McMahan's Chapel, in January 1838 with Representative Thomas J. Rusk. That April, Fowler was made Grand Chaplain of the Grand Lodge of Texas. He succeeded Ruter as superintendent of the Methodist mission in Texas, before becoming Elder of the district of San Augustine in the Texas Conference. Later serving in 1844 as a delegate to the General Conference of the church, he voted in favor of the Plan of Separation that separated the church into North and South, which he personally hated.

Fowler helped found the Wesleyan College of San Augustine and Rutersville College, working briefly as an agent of the latter. He worked with and helped form churches in Marshall, Nacogdoches, Washington-on-the-Brazos, Houston, and other places.

== Personal life ==
In June 1838 he married Missouri M. Lockwood Porter. Their children were Littleton Morris and Mary. Fowler appointed one John Woolam as protector during his absences in exchange for room and education. After Littleton's death in January 1846, Woolam married his widow and became father to Littleton's children as well as a preacher in his own right.

Fowler was a member of a San Augustine Masonic Lodge and was buried under the pulpit of the original McMahan's Chapel.

== Legacy ==
A school, the Fowler Institute of Henderson, Texas was established in his honor in 1847. His Masonic lambskin apron was kept in Longview after his death. In the century after his death, McMahan's Chapel was visited by many for its historical significance. For years preceding the 100 year anniversary of Fowler's death, thousands gathered there annually.
