= Cheryl Avioli =

American politician

Cheryl Avioli (formerly Cheryl Ritchko-Buley) was a Commissioner of the New York State Public Service Commission, which regulates utilities and telecommunications for the State of New York. She is also a former Chairwoman of the New York State Racing and Wagering Board. She was appointed to be a PSC Commissioner for a six-year term in 2006 by Governor George Pataki. Pataki previously named her to be a Commissioner of the Racing and Wagering Board in 2000, for a six-year term.

While on the PSC, Avioli presided over New York's Energy Efficiency Portfolio standard. She also served on the Department of Energy's National Action Plan for Energy Efficiency.

Avioli resigned from the Public Service Commission in September 2008 to "get married and move to Kentucky". She lived in Nicholasville, Kentucky, and occasionally contributed op-eds to local newspapers.
