= Beaulieu Township, Mahnomen County, Minnesota =

Beaulieu Township, Minnesota
- Township
- Location of Beaulieu Township, within Mahnomen County, Minnesota

- Location within the state of Minnesota Beaulieu Township, Minnesota (the United States)
- Coordinates: 47°23′28″N 95°44′31″W
- Country: United States
- State: Minnesota
- County: Mahnomen

Area
  - Total: 35.6 sq mi (92.3 km^{2})
  - Land: 33.5 sq mi (86.7 km^{2})
  - Water: 2.1 sq mi (5.5 km^{2})
- Elevation: 1,339 ft (408 m)

Population (2020)
  - Total: 124
  - Density: 3.70/sq mi (1.43/km^{2})
- Time zone: UTC-6 (Central (CST))
  - Summer (DST): UTC-5 (CDT)
- ZIP code: 56557
- Area code: 218
- FIPS code: 27-04366
- GNIS feature ID: 0663535

Beaulieu Township (/ˈbjuːli/) is a township in Mahnomen County, Minnesota, United States. The population was 124 at the 2020 census. It contains part of the census-designated place of Beaulieu.

Beaulieu Township was named for Henry and John Beaulieu, pioneers who settled there.

== Geography ==
According to the United States Census Bureau, the township has a total area of 35.6 square miles (92 km^{2}), of which 33.5 square miles (87 km^{2}) of it is land and 2.1 square miles (5.4 km^{2}) of it (5.98%) is water.

== Demographics ==
As of the census of 2000, there were 108 people, 40 households, and 30 families residing in the township. The population density was 3.2 inhabitants per square mile (1.2/km^{2}). There were 47 housing units at an average density of 1.4 per square mile (0.54/km^{2}). The racial makeup of the township was 65.74% White, 30.56% Native American, and 3.70% from two or more races. Hispanic or Latino of any race were 0.93% of the population.

There were 40 households, out of which 17.5% had children under the age of 18 living with them, 55.0% were married couples living together, 12.5% had a female householder with no husband present, and 25.0% were non-families. 20.0% of all households were made up of individuals, and 10.0% had someone living alone who was 65 years of age or older. The average household size was 2.53 and the average family size was 2.90.

In the township the population was spread out, with 22.2% under the age of 18, 10.2% from 18 to 24, 19.4% from 25 to 44, 30.6% from 45 to 64, and 17.6% who were 65 years of age or older. The median age was 44 years. For every 100 females, there were 116.0 males. For every 100 females age 18 and over, there were 115.4 males.

The median income for a household in the township was $37,500, and the median income for a family was $40,357. Males had a median income of $20,179 versus $20,625 for females. The per capita income for the township was $19,659. There were 15.8% of families and 14.5% of the population living below the poverty line, including 16.7% of under eighteens and none of those over 64.
