= Beaulieu, Côte-d'Or =

Beaulieu
- Commune
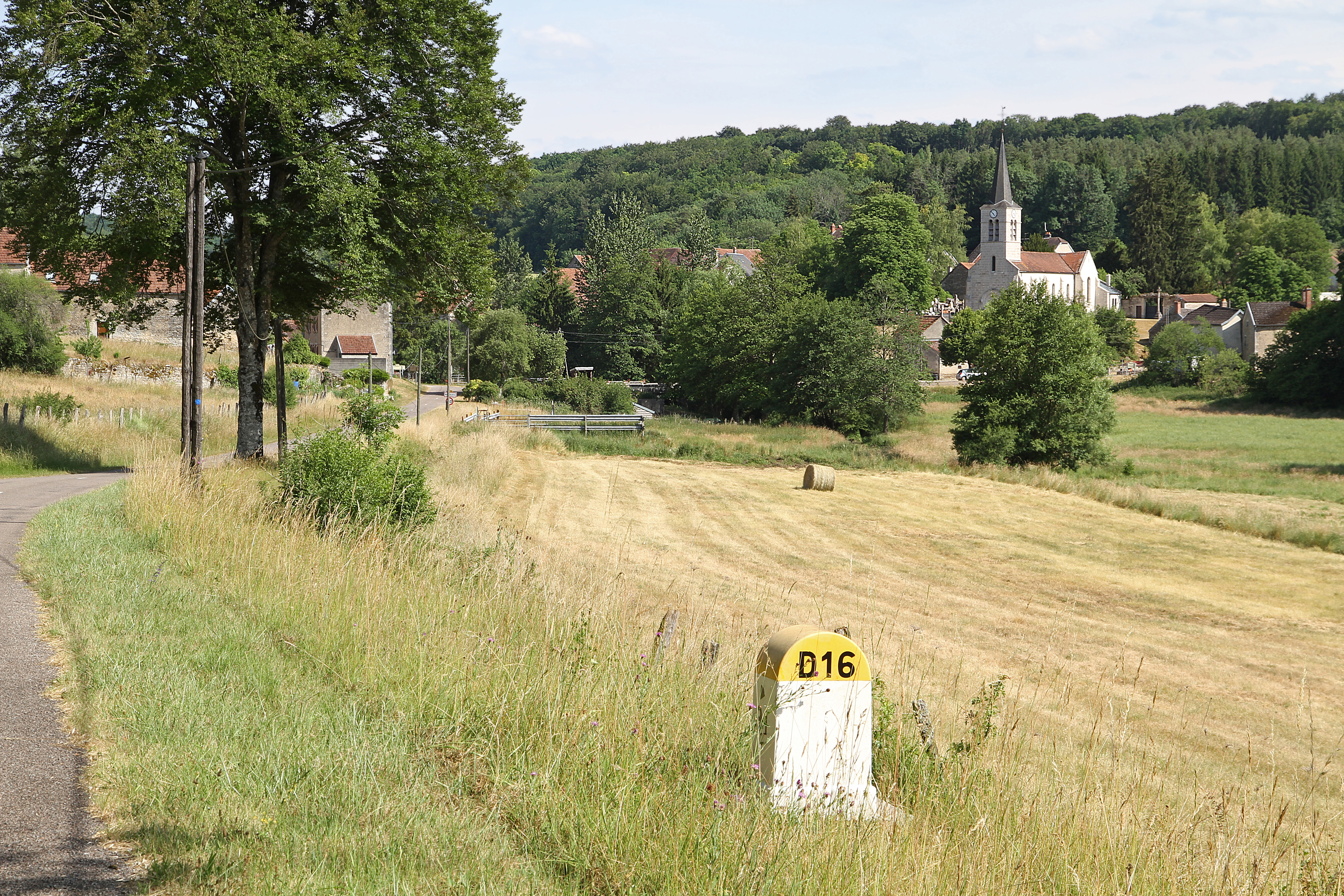
- The road into Beaulieu

- Coat of arms
- Location of Beaulieu
- Location within France Location within Bourgogne-Franche-Comté
- Coordinates: 47°43′41″N 4°43′43″E
- Country: France
- Region: Bourgogne-Franche-Comté
- Department: Côte-d'Or
- Arrondissement: Montbard
- Canton: Châtillon-sur-Seine
- Intercommunality: Pays Châtillonnais

Government
  - Mayor (2023–2026): Laurence Toulouse
- Area^{1}: 6.6 km^{2} (2.5 sq mi)
- Elevation: 300 m (980 ft)
- Highest elevation: 425 m (1,394 ft)
- Lowest elevation: 310 m (1,020 ft)
- Population (2023): 28
  - Density: 4.2/km^{2} (11/sq mi)
- Time zone: UTC+01:00 (CET)
  - Summer (DST): UTC+02:00 (CEST)
- INSEE/Postal code: 21052 /21510
- ^{1} French Land Register data, which excludes lakes, ponds, glaciers > 1 km^{2} (0.386 sq mi or 247 acres) and river estuaries.

Beaulieu (French pronunciation: [boljø]) is a commune in the Côte-d'Or department in eastern France.

== Geography ==
Beaulieu is a small community (less than seven square kilometers) positioned on the plateau of Chatillonais off of the western area of the Langres plateau. The area consists of three kilometers of sloping hills with two rivers that are mostly forested with the southern area part of the great forest of Chatillon.

== Population ==
Historical population
Year	Pop.	±% p.a.
1968	52	—
1975	39	−4.03%
1982	38	−0.37%
1990	37	−0.33%
1999	33	−1.26%
2007	29	−1.60%
2012	34	+3.23%
2017	27	−4.51%
2023	28	+0.61%
Source: INSEE

== See also ==
- Communes of the Côte-d'Or department
