= Beaulieu, Puy-de-Dôme =

Beaulieu
- Commune
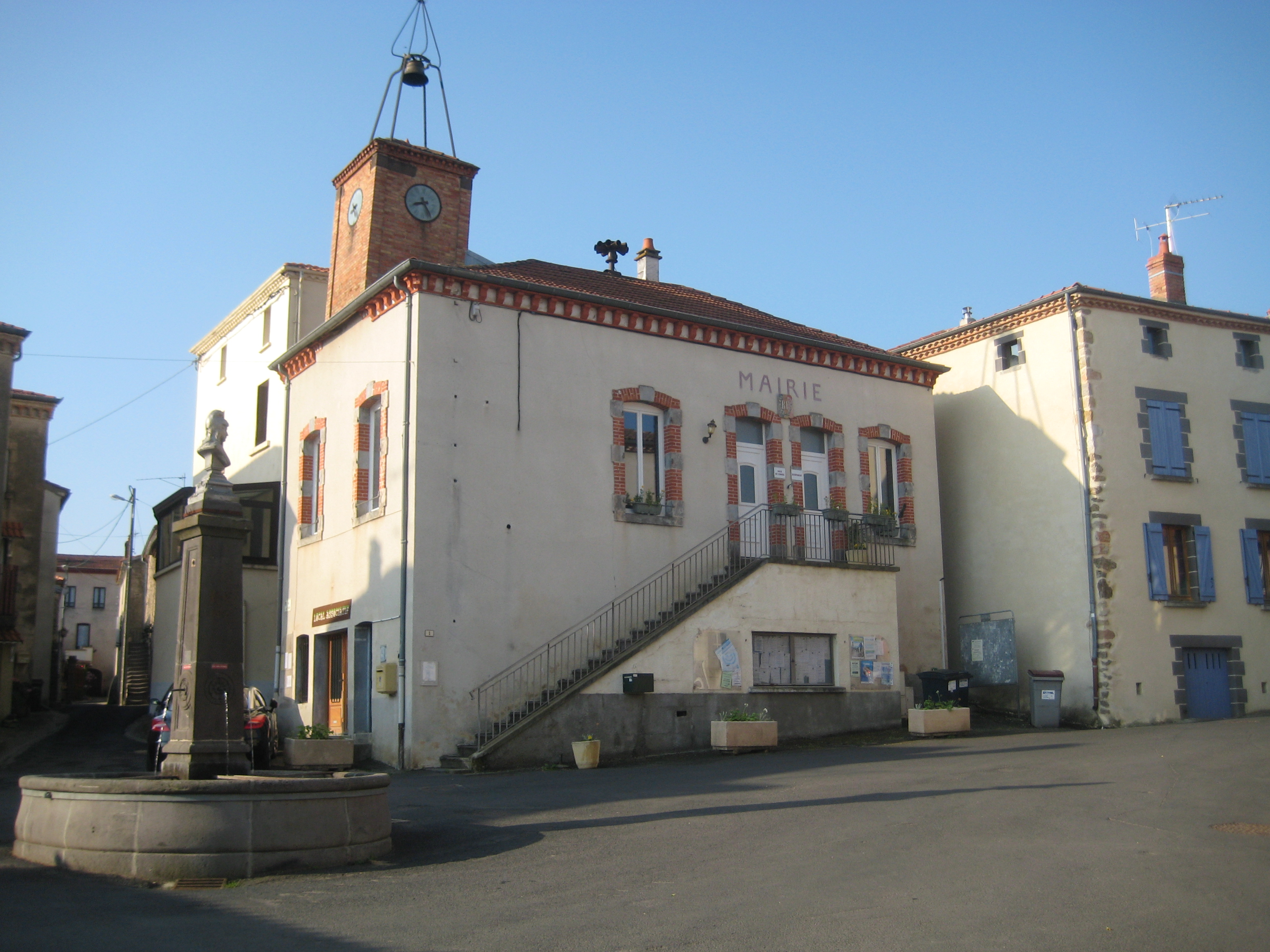
- The town hall in Beaulieu

- Coat of arms
- Location of Beaulieu
- Location within France Location within Auvergne-Rhône-Alpes
- Coordinates: 45°26′40″N 3°17′07″E
- Country: France
- Region: Auvergne-Rhône-Alpes
- Department: Puy-de-Dôme
- Arrondissement: Issoire
- Canton: Brassac-les-Mines
- Intercommunality: Agglo Pays d'Issoire

Government
  - Mayor (2020–2026): Jean-Paul Bernard
- Area^{1}: 8.65 km^{2} (3.34 sq mi)
- Elevation: 398 m (1,306 ft)
- Highest elevation: 495 m (1,624 ft)
- Lowest elevation: 382 m (1,253 ft)
- Population (2023): 473
  - Density: 54.7/km^{2} (142/sq mi)
- Time zone: UTC+01:00 (CET)
  - Summer (DST): UTC+02:00 (CEST)
- INSEE/Postal code: 63031 /63570
- ^{1} French Land Register data, which excludes lakes, ponds, glaciers > 1 km^{2} (0.386 sq mi or 247 acres) and river estuaries.

Beaulieu (French pronunciation: [boljø]; Occitan: Bel Luòc) is a commune in the Puy-de-Dôme department in Auvergne-Rhône-Alpes in central France. It is in the canton of Brassac-les-Mines.

== Population ==
Historical population
Year	Pop.	±% p.a.
1968	400	—
1975	406	+0.21%
1982	403	−0.11%
1990	399	−0.12%
1999	402	+0.08%
2007	411	+0.28%
2012	410	−0.05%
2017	461	+2.37%
2023	473	+0.43%
Source: INSEE

== See also ==
- Communes of the Puy-de-Dôme department
