= Carole A. Bewley =

American scientist

Carole Bewley
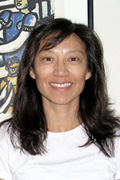
- Bewley in 2013
- Born: Carole Ann Bewley
- Education: University of California, San Diego (PhD)
- Scientific career
- Fields: Chemical Biology, Molecular Pharmacology, Structural Biology, Microbiology and Infectious Diseases
- Workplaces: National Institute of Diabetes and Digestive and Kidney Diseases
- Thesis: New antifungal and cytotoxic cyclic peptides and studies of the bacterial symbionts of lithistid sponges (1995)
- Doctoral advisor: D. John Faulkner

Carole Ann Bewley is an American chemist. She is a senior investigator and Chief of the Laboratory of Bioorganic Chemistry at the United States National Institute of Diabetes and Digestive and Kidney Diseases. Bewley researches secondary metabolites and basic principles involved in protein-carbohydrate interactions and how these can be exploited to engineer therapeutics.

== Education ==
Bewley completed a Ph.D. from University of California, San Diego in 1995. Her dissertation was titled New antifungal and cytotoxic cyclic peptides and studies of the bacterial symbionts of lithistid sponges. Bewley's doctoral advisor was D. John Faulkner.

== Career and research ==
Bewley is a senior investigator and Chief of the Laboratory of Bioorganic Chemistry at the National Institute of Diabetes and Digestive and Kidney Diseases. Her scientific focus includes chemical biology, molecular pharmacology, structural biology, microbiology, and infectious diseases. Bewley researches secondary metabolites and basic principles involved in protein-carbohydrate interactions and how these can be exploited to engineer therapeutics. She also designs and synthesizes small molecules and peptides that block, or can be used to probe the events that lead to viral entry. Her scientific focus includes chemical biology, molecular pharmacology, structural biology, microbiology, and infectious diseases.
