= Marie-Hélène Beaulieu =

Canadian artist

Marie-Hélène Beaulieu (French pronunciation: [maʁi elɛn boljø]; born 1979) is a Canadian glass artist. She was born in Rouyn-Noranda, Quebec. She studied at the Centre des métiers du verre du Québec. In 2006 she co-founded the Atelier Sébomari with fellow glass artist Sébastien Duchang. In 2015 she received the Prix Jean-Marie Gauvreau.

Her work is included in the collections of the Musée national des beaux-arts du Québec and the Montreal Museum of Fine Arts
