= Treaty of Bird's Fort =

1843 treaty between Texas and Native Americans

The Treaty of Bird's Fort, or Bird's Fort Treaty was a peace treaty between the Republic of Texas and some of the Indian tribes of Texas and Oklahoma, signed on September 29, 1843. The treaty was intended to end years of hostilities and warfare between the Native Americans and the white settlers in Texas. The full title of the treaty was "Republic of Texas Treaty with the Indigenous Nations of the Delaware, Chickasaw, Waco, Tawakani, Keechi, Caddo, Anadahkah, Ionie, Biloxi, and Cherokee." The principal negotiators for the Republic of Texas were Edward H. Tarrant and George W. Terrell.

== Background ==
President of Texas Sam Houston had made it one of his top priorities to end hostilities with the Indians. On July 1, 1842, Houston appointed a commission to "treat with any and all Indians on the Frontiers of Texas." The Indians were also amenable to a treaty, having lost many of their young men in wars with the whites. In August 1842, the Indians agreed to a peace council to be held at Waco on October 26. The chiefs did not appear for that council, but on March 31, 1843, the chiefs of the nine tribes agreed to a council of peace. The council and the commissioners met six months later and concluded a peace treaty on September 29, 1843. The meeting was held and treaty was signed at Bird's Fort on the Trinity River at present-day Arlington, Texas. The GPS coordinates for the original site of Bird's Fort are approximately 32°47′57″N 97°04′59″W (converted from UTM).

The Senate of Texas ratified the treaty on January 31, 1844. President Houston signed the treaty on February 3, 1844 in Washington, Texas.

== Terms of the treaty ==
The treaty comprised 24 articles. A summary of the articles follows.

1. Article I. The parties will "always live in peace" and "meet as friends and brothers. The existing state of war shall cease and never be renewed."
2. Article II. The parties agree that it is the "duty of warriors to protect women and children" and that they will never make war on them; only on warriors.
3. Article III. The Indians will never "unite with the enemies of Texas" nor make any treaty with them which would require the Indians to take part against Texas.
4. Article IV. If Texas is at war with anyone, an Indian chief will counsel with the President of Texas.
5. Article V. Texas will appoint agents to hear the complaints of the Indians, to ensure justice between the Indians and the whites, and to communicate the orders and wishes of the President to the Indians.
6. Article VI. No one may "go among the Indians to trade" except by the authority of the government of Texas.
7. Article VII. No white man may sell or provide "ardent spirits or intoxicating liquors" to the Indians.
8. Article VIII. No one except a licensed trader may "purchase any property of an Indian" without the authority of the government of Texas.
9. Article IX. If any property of the Indians is found among the whites, or any property of the whites is found among the Indians, it shall be returned to its rightful owner.
10. Article X. No trader may furnish any "warlike stores" to the Indians without the permission of the President of Texas.
11. Article XI. No one may "pass the line of trading houses" (at the border of the Indians' territory) without permission of the President, and may not reside or remain in the Indians' territory. These "trading houses" were later established at the junction of the Clear Fork and West Fort of the Trinity River in present-day Fort Worth. At this river junction, the U.S. War Department established Fort Worth in 1849 as the northernmost of a system of forts for protecting the American Frontier following the end of the Mexican–American War. The City of Fort Worth continues to be known as "where the West begins."
12. Article XII. Any person who "molest[s] or attempt[s] to molest" the persons or property of the Indians while they remain peaceable, shall be punished for a felony.
13. Article XIII. Any white man who kills an Indian or commits an outrage against an Indian, shall be punished for a felony.
14. Article XIV. If an Indian kills a white person, he will be punished by death. If an Indian steals the property of a white man, he shall be punished by the tribe.
15. Article XV. No Indian may "cross the line" without authority and passport. No Indian may sell any property to a white man without authority.
16. Article XVI. If anyone "come[s] among the Indians without authority," the Indians will seize him and deliver him to the Indian agent.
17. Article XVII. The parties will mutually exchange prisoners, and "not be friendly" with any people or nation who will take prisoners from Texas.
18. Article XVIII. The President of Texas may "send among the Indians" blacksmiths and other mechanics, and schoolmasters for the purpose of instructing the Indians in English and Christianity.
19. Article XIX. When the President sends people among the Indians as described in Article XVIII, the Indians will "extend to them kind treatment and protect them from harm."
20. Article XX. The chiefs and headmen of the Indians will cause their "young men and warriors to behave themselves" in accordance with the treaty, and will punish them so as to keep the peace between "the white men and red brothers."
21. Article XXI. Should any difficulty or cause for war arise between Texas and the Indians, the Indians will send their complaints to the President and hear his answer before commencing hostilities; and the government of Texas will do likewise.
22. Article XXII. After the Indians have shown that they will keep the treaty and not make war upon the whites, the President will authorize the traders to sell arms to the Indians, and to provide gifts to the Indians.
23. Article XXIII. The government of Texas will have the right of working all mines that have been discovered or will be discovered on the territory of the Indians.
24. Article XXIV. The President will make all arrangements and regulations with the Indians as he sees fit "for their peace and happiness."

== See also ==
- Yowani Choctaws
- Treaty of Tehuacana Creek, signed the following year
