= Edward H. Tarrant =

American politician (1796–1858)

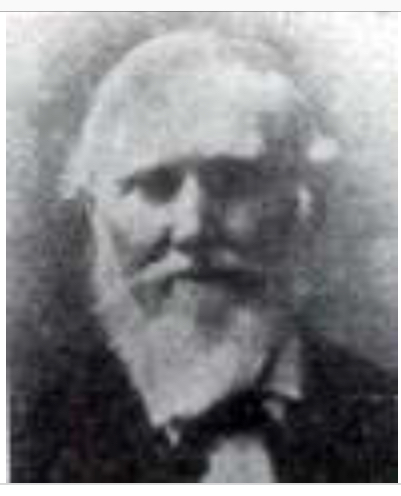

Member of the Third Texas Legislature from the district
- In office November 5, 1849 – November 3, 1851

Member of the Fourth Texas Legislature from the district
- In office November 3, 1851 – November 7, 1853

Personal details
- Born: 1796 Bamberg County, South Carolina, US
- Died: August 2, 1858 (aged 61–62) Parker County, Texas, US
- Resting place: Pioneers Rest Cemetery; 32.76487°N 97.329434°W
- Occupation: Military officer, farmer, politician
- Profession: Brigadier-general

Military service
- Allegiance: United States; Texas
- Branch/service: Kentucky militia; Tennessee militia; 4th Brigade of N.E. Texas (militia)
- Battles/wars: Battle of New Orleans (War of 1812); Texas-Indian wars; Battle of Village Creek

Edward H. Tarrant (1796 – August 2, 1858) was an American politician and general. He served in the Texas House of Representatives during both periods. Tarrant County, whose county seat is Fort Worth, was named after him.

== Early life and education ==
Tarrant was a veteran of the War of 1812, taking part in the Battle of New Orleans (1814–15) at age 19, probably as a private in the Kentucky state militia. Having moved to Tennessee, he was elected a colonel of the Tennessee state militia, in the frontier environment. By 1827, Tarrant had become a sheriff of Henry County, Tennessee, but he moved to Texas by the early 1830s and established a ranch in Red River County. He became one of the most prosperous landowners, and he owned slaves.

== Career ==
In September 1837, Tarrant was elected to represent Red River County in the House of Representatives of the Second Texan Congress; but after a few months, he resigned to serve the republic by directing ranger activities against the Indians in 1838. In 1838–39, he served as chief justice in Red River County and was elected Brigadier-general of a northeast Texas militia unit called the Fourth Brigade. Tarrant's Indian-fighting career culminated in the Battle of Village Creek, east of present-day Fort Worth, in May 1841. In the battle, fellow county namesake John B. Denton was killed, and now Denton and Denton County in Texas are named in memorial to him.

In 1843, Tarrant, along with George W. Terrell, negotiated the Treaty of Bird's Fort with nine tribes of Native Americans.

Tarrant served two terms in the state House of Representatives, between 1849 and 1853. In April 1851, he married Mary Danforth, a 19 year old at the time. The couple resided on Chambers Creek near Italy, Ellis County, Texas.

As fighting Indians had become his specialty, in 1857, Tarrant moved part of his household to Fort Belknap in present-day Young County. He led a "go-to" fighting force to protect settlers in that locale from frequent Indian uprisings.

== Later life and death ==
In 1857, Tarrant began moving part of his household to Fort Belknap. On one of his journeys, General Tarrant fell ill and died on August 2, 1858, at the home of William Fondren, which is 10 miles from Weatherford, Texas, in Parker County. He was initially interred in the William Fondren family cemetery. On January 28, 1859, Tarrant's remains were moved to a grave on his Chambers Creek family farm in Ellis County, Texas. Tarrant's final resting place, effective March 3, 1928, is Pioneers Rest Cemetery in Fort Worth, Texas, the seat of his namesake county.

Tarrant's widow later married James Emerson Hawkins, a settler of Midlothian, Texas.
