= Luke de Beaulieu =

Huguenot exile and cleric

- Died: 1723

Luke de Beaulieu (died 1723) was a Huguenot exile and cleric in England.

== Life ==
De Beaulieu was educated at the University of Saumur. Obliged to quit his country on account of his religion, he sought refuge in England about 1667, settled there, and rapidly became known as an acute and learned ecclesiastic. In November 1670 he received the vicarage of Upton-cum-Chalvey, Buckinghamshire, having a short time before been elected divinity reader in St George's Chapel, Windsor Castle. Beaulieu obtained an act of naturalisation in June 1682. A year later we find him acting as chaplain to the infamous Judge Jeffreys, an office which he continued to hold till the revolution brought his patron's career to a close. Meanwhile, he had become a student at Oxford in 1680, "for the sake of the public library", says Wood, but be does not seem to have permanently lived there. As a member of Christ Church he look the degree of B.D. 7 July 1685, and in October the same year was presented by Jeffreys to the rectory of Whitchurch, near Reading. He had resigned his living of Upton in 1681.

He was installed prebendary of St. Paul's 17 January 1686–7, and on the following 21 May, Prebendary of Gloucester, promotions which he again owed to the lord chancellor.

Beaulieu is chiefly known as the author of a remarkably eloquent and original manual of devotion, entitled "Claustrum Animæ, the Reformed Monastery, or the Love of Jesus", two parts, duodecimo, London, 1677–76, which reached a fourth edition in 1699. This little work is dedicated, under the initials of L. B., to Dr. John Fell, bishop of Oxford, who was also dean of Christ Church, and to whom the author expresses himself under obligations. Beaulieu was afterwards chosen one of the bishop's chaplains.

== Death and family ==
He died 26 May 1723, aged 78, and was buried on the 30th at Whitchurch. His wife Priscilla was laid in the same grave 6 December 1728. Their son, George de Beaulieu, matriculated at his father's college, Christ Church, Oxford, took his B. A. degree in 1708, and entered into orders. He was buried with his parents 17 May 1738.

== Correspondence ==
The late Dr. George Oliver, of Exeter, possessed some curious correspondence of Luke de Beaulieu with a certain Franciscan friar, in reference to devotional manuals and books of meditation, which is said to indicate "the yet abiding influence of the Laudian revival up to that period".

== Works ==
Besides the above-mentioned work and several sermons Beaulieu was the acknowledged author of:

1. Take heed of both Extreams, or plain and useful Cautions against Popery and Presbytery, in two parts, octavo, London, 1675.
2. The Holy Inquisition, wherein is represented what is the religion of the church of Rome, and how they are dealt with that dissent from it, octavo, London, 1681.
3. A Discourse showing that Protestants are on the safer side, notwithstanding the uncharitable judgment of their adversaries, and that their religion is the surest way to heaven, quarto, London, 1687, which has been twice reprinted.
4. The Infernal Observator, or the Quickning Dead, octavo, London, 1684, which, according to Wood, was originally written in French.

Beaulieu also translated from the Latin Bishop Cosin's History of Popish Transubstantiation, octavo, London, 1676. (Note: Information from the Rector of Whitchurch) (Note: Wood's Athen. Oxon. ed. Bliss, iv. 668) (Note: Lipscomb's Hist. Buckinghamshire, iv. 573) (Note: Le Neve'a Fasti Ecel. Angl. ed. Hardy, i. 460, ii. 443) (Note: Agnew's Protestant Exiles, 2nd ed. i. 30. 42, iii. 19) (Note: Hist. Reg. 1722, Chronicles Diary, page 29) (Note: Notes and Queries, 2nd ser. x. 307, 3rd. ser. vii. 37-8) (Note: Introduction by F. G. L. to new edit. of the Reformed Monastery. duodecimo, London (1865)) (Note: Jones's Catalogue of Tracts for and against Popery (Chetham Soc.), part i. 237. ii. 382. 523.)
