= Beaulieu, Minnesota =

Census-designated place in Minnesota, US

Beaulieu, Minnesota Ziibiing (Ojibwe)
- Census-designated place
- Location within Minnesota Location within the United States
- Coordinates: 47°20′20″N 95°48′20″W
- Country: United States
- State: Minnesota
- County: Mahnomen
- Townships: Beaulieu, Chief

Area
  - Total: 3.90 sq mi (10.09 km^{2})
  - Land: 3.86 sq mi (10.01 km^{2})
  - Water: 0.027 sq mi (0.07 km^{2})
- Elevation: 1,270 ft (390 m)

Population (2020)
  - Total: 103
  - Density: 26.7/sq mi (10.29/km^{2})
- Time zone: UTC-6 (Central (CST))
  - Summer (DST): UTC-5 (CDT)
- ZIP Code: 56557 (Mahnomen)
- Area code: 218
- GNIS feature ID: 2583773
- FIPS code: 27-04348

Beaulieu (/ˈbjuːlɪ/, Ojibwe: Ziibiing) is a census-designated place and unincorporated community in Beaulieu and Chief townships, Mahnomen County, Minnesota, United States. Its population was 103 as of the 2020 census.

== History ==
A post office called Beaulieu was established in 1891, and remained in operation until 1960. John Beaulieu, the postmaster, gave the community its name.

The Wild Rice River Boarding and Day School, an American Indian residential school, operated in Beaulieu from 1884 to 1915.

== Geography ==
Beaulieu is in central Mahnomen County, on the north side of Minnesota State Highway 200. It is bordered to the south, across MN 200, by Midway. The east half of the CDP is in Beaulieu Township, while the west half is in Chief Township. The center of Beaulieu is about 0.8 miles (1.3 km) north of MN 200 along County Road 3 (220th Avenue), which follows the border between the two townships. MN 200 leads west 8 miles (13 km) to Mahnomen, the county seat, and east 12 miles (19 km) to Roy Lake.

According to the U.S. Census Bureau, the Beaulieu CDP has an area of 3.9 square miles (10 km^{2}), of which 0.3 square miles (0.8 km^{2}), or 0.72%, are water. The Wild Rice River passes through the community, flowing west to Mahnomen and eventually to the Red River at the North Dakota state line.

== Demographics ==
Historical population
Census	Pop.	Note	%±
2010	48		—
2020	103		114.6%
U.S. Decennial Census
