= Susan Bewley =

British consultant obstetrician

- Born: July 1958 (age 68); Dublin, Ireland
- Education: University of Oxford
- Occupation: Obstetrician
- Title: Professor of Obstetrics & Women's Health, King's College London
- Children: 1
- Parent(s): Thomas Bewley; Beulah Knox

Susan Jane Bewley (born July 1958) is a British obstetrician, and emeritus Professor of Obstetric and Women's Health at King's College London.

Born in Ireland and qualified from London, she specialised in complicated births and severe maternal morbidity. Her main research areas have been on severe maternal diseases and violence in pregnancy, with other work in fertility and intrapartum guidance with the National Institute for Clinical Excellence (NICE). In addition, she has been involved with several charities.

== Early life and education ==
Bewley was born in 1958 in Dublin, Ireland. Her father Thomas Bewley, was a psychiatrist. Her mother, Beulah Bewley, daughter of banker John Knox and the affluent heiress Ina Charles, became a dame for her work on women in medicine. Bewley is the eldest and only doctor of five siblings, having three sisters and one brother. Bewley shocked her mother when she came out to her and moved in with her girlfriend.

As a child, Bewley regularly visited her relatives in then troubled Northern Ireland. Her recollections include a story about how her cousins taught her to sound less English whilst in Ireland.

Bewley earned a bachelor's degree from the University of Oxford in 1979, and qualified as doctor at Middlesex Hospital in 1982. She self financed a master's degree in medical law and ethics, where she also became interested in domestic violence.

== Medical career ==
Inspired by her parents and the late obstetrician and gynaecologist Professor Geoffrey Chamberlain, Bewley specialised in complicated births and severe maternal morbidity.

Her principal research centres on severe maternal diseases and violence in pregnancy. She was the first woman accomplished in Maternal-Fetal Medicine in the UK and has edited numerous books. She has played a key role in the National Institute for Clinical Excellence Fertility Guideline Development Group and the Intrapartum Guideline Development Group. She has criticized homeopathy and highlighted distortions in previous breast cancer screening leaflets. By sending an open letter to the BMJ, Bewley caused a national review into breast cancer screening. This is because in her letter she argued that the NHS leaflets that women received were not transparent about the risks associated with breast cancer screening.

In addition, Bewley works and volunteers for various charities including HealthWatch (for treatments that work), Sophia Forum (the UK branch of the Global Coalition on Women and AIDS), and Maternity Action (which works to end inequality and promote the health and wellbeing of pregnant women).

In 2005, Bewley and fertility expert Melanie Davies published "Which Career First? The most secure age for childbearing remains 20-35" in the British Medical Journal. Debating the reasons for having children at an older age, in what way this worsens outcomes and how assisted conception has contributed, it triggered a discussion on childbearing in older women.

== Other activities ==
It was at the request of her ill mother, Dame Beulah Bewley, that Bewley helped her complete and edit My Life As A Woman and Doctor, memoirs of Beulah Bewley.

== Selected works ==
- Bewley, Susan, and Jan Welch. ABC of Domestic and Sexual Violence. Wiley; 2014. ISBN 9781118482179.
- Subotsky, F., Bewley, S., & Crowe, M. (Eds.). (2010). Abuse of the Doctor-Patient Relationship. Cambridge: Royal College of Psychiatrists. ISBN 9781108677288 (ebook).
