= John B. Denton =

American minister (1806–1841)

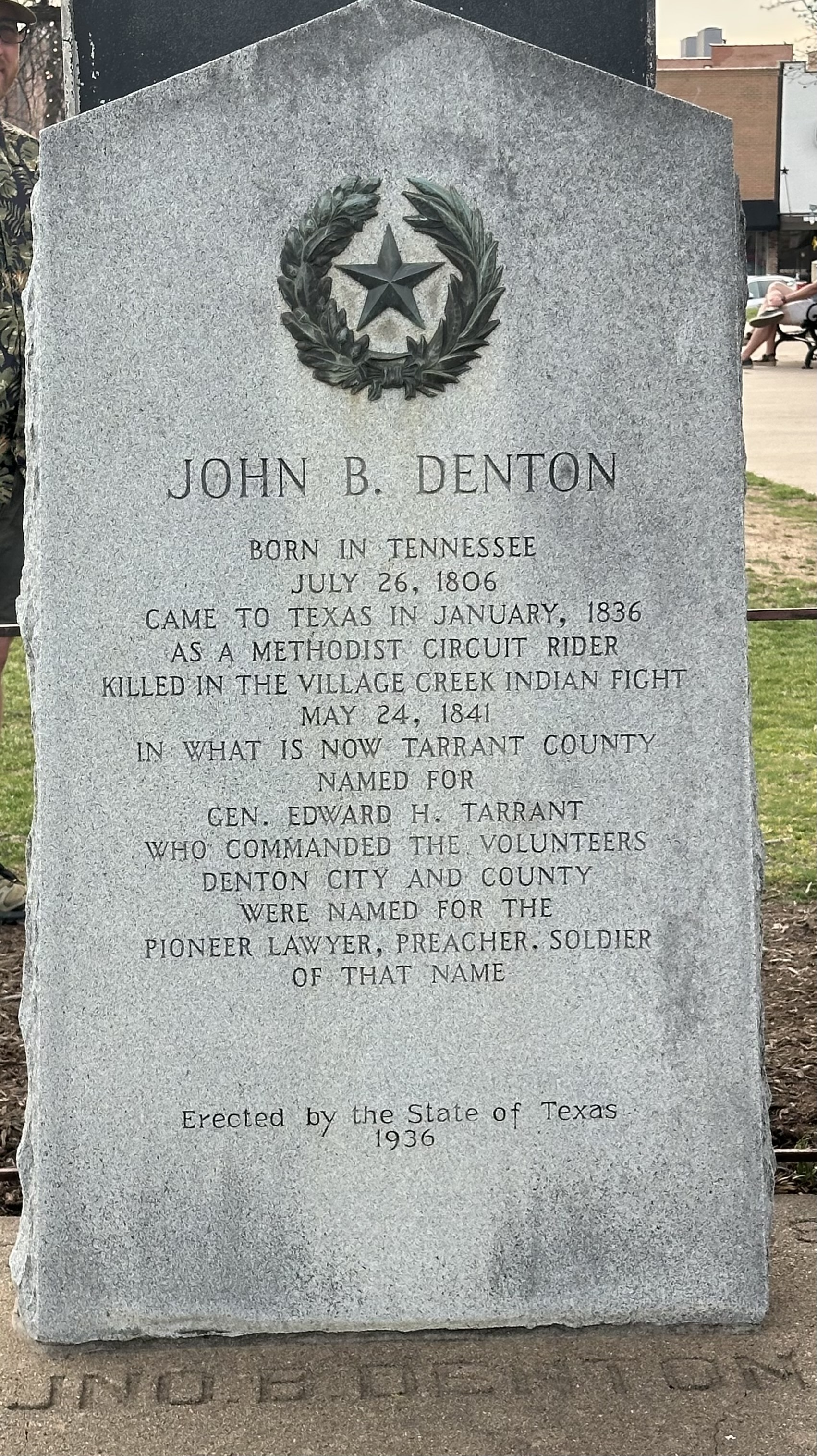
Headstone at the Old Denton County Courthouse, resting place of John B. Denton.

John B. Denton (July 28, 1806 – May 24, 1841) also shown in secondary references as John Bunard Denton and John Bunyan Denton, was a Methodist minister, lawyer, soldier, and political candidate for whom both Denton County, Texas and the city of Denton, Texas, were named. He converted to Methodism soon after meeting his future wife, Mary Greenlee Stewart, who also taught him how to read and write. He later became a captain and was known for his battles against Native Americans. He died in 1841 after the Battle of Village Creek, an attack on a Keechi village in adjacent Tarrant County.

== Early life ==
John Denton was born in Tennessee, in 1806. When he was 8, he and his brother were apprenticed to a blacksmith and Methodist Minister, Jacob Wells, and they moved to Clark County, Arkansas. By age 12, he worked as a deckhand on a river flatboat. In 1824, he returned to Clark County and married Mary Greenlee Stewart, who was 16 at the time. Stewart is credited for teaching John how to read and write. In 1826, Denton worked as a local preacher in Clark County, and in 1833, joined the Missouri Conference of the Methodist Church, and became a circuit preacher in Arkansas and Southern Missouri for a year, before returning to Clark County as a local preacher once more. In the fall of 1837, he crossed the Red River into Texas along with fellow minister Littleton Fowler and became a circuit preacher in the Sulphur Fork Circuit, which included Red River and Lamar Counties. His family remained in Hempstead County, Arkansas, but in 1838 came to Clarksville in Red River County. Denton gained a reputation for being a skillful orator, although the job was hard as it paid very little for long hours.

== Law career ==
In 1838, Denton started to study law. He formed a partnership with John B. Craig, a part-time Methodist preacher, who stayed behind while Denton travelled to attend court cases. Denton and Craig "speculated in thousands of acres of land in the newly opened northeast territory." His skills as a preacher helped him to present many cases. His traveling also permitted him to preach, and he gave one of the first sermons ever in Fannin and Grayson Counties, in Old Warren on the county line. He was an active member of the Masonic Lodge at De Kalb and helped establish Constatine Lodge 13 at Fort Warren.

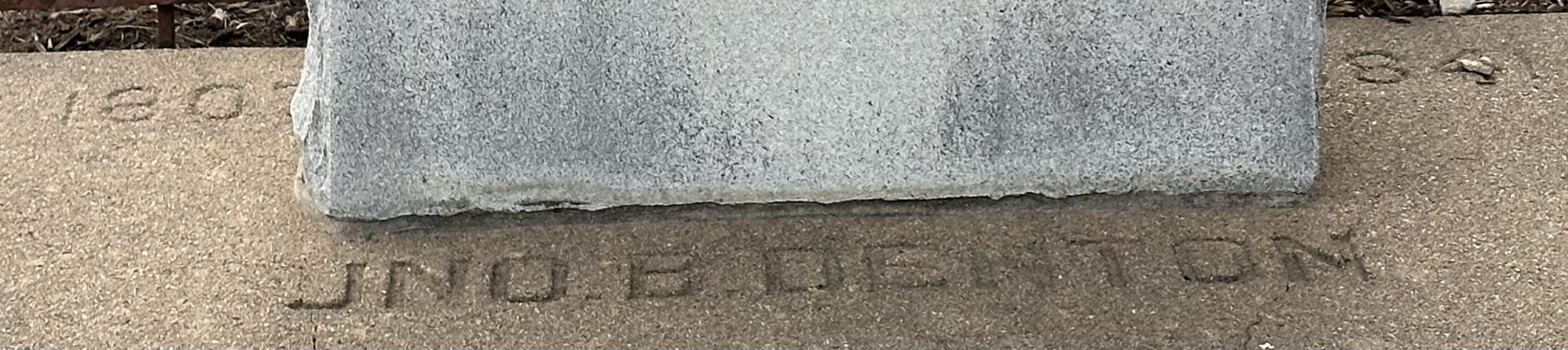
Engraving on the cement directly in front of his headstone.

== Military career and death ==
In 1839, Denton was called to be in a volunteer militia and promptly replied to join. In 1841, the Fourth Brigade of the Texas Militia, led by Brigadier-General Edward H. Tarrant, was called upon to find an attack party of Native Americans that had previously killed the Ripley family that lived south of Clarksville. The group located and took the first two villages they found, which belonged to the Keechi Indians, but they found a third one and when they tried to take it, they were met with gunfire. Denton and Henry Stout, an aide of Tarrant, were going on two separate paths, each with a group of scouts when the paths converged. Stout stayed back, but Denton went forward. Both were shot. Stout survived but not Denton. The brigade retreated and buried Denton in what would later become Denton County.

Denton is now buried in his namesake county and city, on the southeast corner of the lawn of the Denton County Courthouse-on-the-Square. The headstone of the grave reads as follows:

        JOHN B. DENTON
       BORN IN TENNESSEE
         JULY 26, 1806
   CAME TO TEXAS IN JANUARY, 1836
   AS A METHODIST CIRCUIT RIDER
KILLED IN THE VILLAGE CREEK INDIAN FIGHT
           MAY 24, 1841
   IN WHAT IS NOW TARRANT COUNTY
          NAMED FOR
    GEN. EDWARD H. TARRANT
  WHO COMMANDED THE VOLUNTEERS
DENTON CITY AND COUNTY WERE NAMED FOR THE 
PIONEER LAWYER, PREACHER. SOLDIER OF THAT NAME
  Erected by the State of Texas 1936

Directly in front of the headstone, it reads ‘JNO. B. DENTON’. This is most likely an abbreviation as used in the 18th and 19th centuries. On opposing sides of the headstone, it has the years ‘1807’ and ‘1841’. The first year is a mistake, Denton having been born a year earlier. These engravings predate 1936.
