= Beaulieu Lake =

Lake in the state of Minnesota, United States

- Location within Minnesota
- Location: Mahnomen County, Minnesota
- Coordinates: 47°29′N 95°51.5′W
- Type: lake

Beaulieu Lake is a lake in Mahnomen County, in the U.S. state of Minnesota.

Beaulieu Lake was named for Alexander H. Beaulieu, a pioneer who settled there.

== See also ==
- List of lakes in Minnesota
