= Geneviève Brossard de Beaulieu =

French artist (1755–1832)

- Born: 1755; La Rochelle, France
- Died: c. 1835; Paris, France
- Known for: Painting

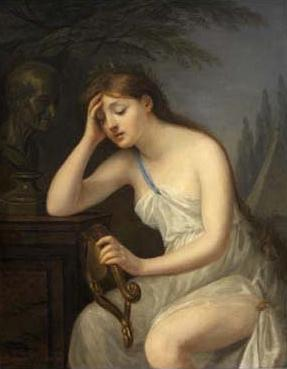
Geneviève Brossard de Beaulieu, La muse de la Poésie livrée aux regrets que lui laisse la mort de Voltaire, 93 x 73 cm. Louvre, Paris

Geneviève Brossard de Beaulieu (fl. c. 1770 - 1815) was a French painter. She was born at La Rochelle and studied painting under Jean-Baptiste Greuze. She established herself as a successful artist, specializing in historical and mythological genres and portraiture. She ran a school at Lille, Belgium, in Flanders, until the outbreak of the French Revolution. With the restoration of the Bourbons (1814–1815) she was granted a state pension. Several of her works survive, including a portrait of Princess Elisabeth Lubomirksa which remains in the National Museum of Warsaw in Poland.
