= Beulah Bewley =

British public health physician (1929–2018)

Dame Beulah Bewley DBE
- Born: Beulah Rosemary Knox; 2 September 1929; County Londonderry, Northern Ireland, UK
- Died: 20 January 2018 (aged 88); London, England, UK
- Education: Alexandra College; Trinity College Dublin
- Occupation: public health physician
- Known for: President of the Medical Women's Federation on the General Medical Council
- Spouse: Thomas Bewley (m. 1955)
- Children: 5, including Susan

Dame Beulah Rosemary Bewley DBE (née Knox; 2 September 1929 – 20 January 2018) was a British public health physician and past president of the Medical Women's Federation on the General Medical Council.

== Early life and education ==
Bewley was born Beulah Rosemary Knox on 2 September 1929 in a Protestant family in County Londonderry, Northern Ireland, the second of three daughters of Ina Eagleson Knox (née Charles), who came from a wealthy family, and John Benjamin Knox, who worked for the Ulster Bank. Aged 14 she became a boarder at Dublin's Alexandra College.

Aged five, Bewley decided that she wanted to become a doctor, and went on to qualify as a doctor at Trinity College Dublin in 1953. In 1955, she married Thomas Bewley and moved to England where she worked in paediatrics for fifteen years, before undertaking a MSc degree in social medicine at the London School of Hygiene & Tropical Medicine, where she was the only woman in the class.

== Career ==
After training in public health, she worked at several institutions in London including the Academic Department of Community Medicine at King's College Hospital Medical School and the Department of Community Medicine, St Thomas’s Hospital Medical School, London. It was in the latter that she began an extensive programme of research into cigarette smoking among children and adolescents. In 1978, she moved to the London School of Hygiene and Tropical Medicine.

In 1982, she served on the Faculty of Public Health Medicine of the Royal College of Physicians of the United Kingdom. She served on the Royal Society of Medicine's section on Epidemiology and Public Health.

Her medical school, Trinity College, celebrated its tercentenary in 2011, and Bewley served on the tercentenary board from 2007 to 2012.

== Awards and honours ==
=== General ===
- 2000: Dame Commander of the Order of the British Empire in 2000 New Year Honours for services to public health, and in recognition of her leading role in promoting equal opportunities for women.
- 2002: Honorary LLD by Trinity College Dublin.

=== Medical ===
- Fellow of the Royal College of Paediatrics and Child Health
- Fellow of the Royal College of Physicians
- Fellow of the Faculty of Public Health Medicine

== Selected works ==
=== Autobiography ===
- Bewley, Beulah (2016). Bewley, Susan (ed.). Beulah Bewley – My Life as a Woman and Doctor. SilverWood Books. ISBN 978-1781324196. (autobiography)

=== Publications on smoking ===
- Bewley BR, Bland JM, Harris R. (1974) Factors associated with the starting of cigarette smoking by primary school children. British Journal of Preventive and Social Medicine 28, 37–44.
- Bland JM, Bewley BR, Day I. (1975) Primary schoolboys: image of self and smoker. British Journal of Preventive and Social Medicine 29, 262–266.
- Bland JM, Bewley BR, Banks MH, Pollard VM. (1975) Schoolchildren's beliefs about smoking and disease. Health Education Journal 34, 71–78.
- Bewley BR, Bland JM. (1976) Smoking and respiratory symptoms in two groups of schoolchildren. Preventive Medicine 5, 63–69.
- Bewley BR, Bland JM. (1976) Academic performance and social factors related to cigarette smoking by schoolchildren. British Journal of Preventive and Social Medicine 31, 18–24.
- Bewley BR, Bland JM. (1978) The child's image of a young smoker. Health Education Journal 37, 236–241.
- Banks MH, Bewley BR, Bland JM, Dean JR, Pollard VM. (1978) A long-term study of smoking by secondary schoolchildren. Archives of Disease in Childhood 53, 12–19.
- Bland JM, Bewley BR, Pollard V, Banks MH. (1978) Effect of children's and parents' smoking on respiratory symptoms. Archives of Disease in Childhood 53, 100–105.
- Bewley, B.R., Murray, M., & Johnson, M.R.D. (1978). Smoking by Derbyshire schoolchildren. Finnish Journal of Social Medicine, 15: 197–203.
- Bland JM, Bewley BR, Banks MH. (1979) Cigarette smoking and children's respiratory symptoms: validity of questionnaire method. Revue d'Epidemiologie et Sante Publique 27, 69–76.
- Bewley BR, Johnson MRD, Bland JM, Murray M. (1980) Trends in children's smoking. Community Medicine 2, 186–189.
- Johnson, M.R.D., Murray, M., Bewley, B.R., & Clyde, D.C. (1981). Social class, parents, children and smoking. Bulletin of International Union against Tuberculosis [International Journal of Tuberculosis and Lung Disease], 57: 258 262.
- Banks MH, Bewley BR, Bland JM. (1981) Adolescent attitudes to smoking: their influence on behaviour. International Journal of Health Education 24, 39–44.
- Murray, M., Swan, A.V., Johnson, M.R.D., & Bewley, B.R. (1983). Some factors associated with increased risk of smoking by children. Journal of Child Psychology and Psychiatry, 24: 223 232.
- Murray, M. Swan, A.V., Bewley, B.R., & Johnson, M.R.D. (1983). The development of smoking during adolescence. International Journal of Epidemiology 12: 185 192.
- Johnson MRD, Bewley BR, Banks MH, Bland JM, Clyde DV. (1985) Schools and Smoking: school features and variations in cigarette smoking by children and teachers. British Journal of Educational Psychology 55, 34–44.

=== Other publications ===
- Bewley, Beulah R.; Walsworth-Bell, Jo (May 1982). "For discussion: The inadequacy of adolescent health statistics". Journal of Public Health. doi:10.1093/oxfordjournals.pubmed.a043544.

== Quotes ==
- "As early as 1902 Ballantyne had found an increase in the abortion rate in French and Austrian women working in tobacco factories."
- "There certainly was discrimination. They used to look at you and say she is married, or she has got children and if you were not married, they were expecting you to get married."
- "Promotion by tobacco companies may then be seen for what it is—the ‘pushing' of a dangerous drug."

== Personal life ==
In Bewley's fourth year at Trinity College Dublin, she met a young psychiatrist, Thomas Bewley, from a Quaker family that owned Bewley's coffee shops. They married in 1955, and had five children. Their second daughter, born with Down syndrome, defied early expectations regarding her health, and lived until the age of 44.

She was greatly upset when her daughter Susan came out as a lesbian, but the rift was healed. Susan went on to become a medical professor, and to write her mother's memoirs.

== Death ==
Dame Beulah Bewley died from cardiovascular disease and dementia on 20 January 2018 at the age of 88 in London. She was survived by four children and her husband.
