= Désiré Beaulieu =

French composer and concert organizer

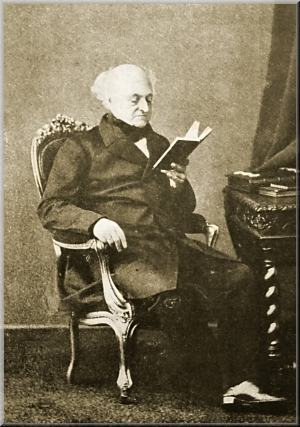
Désiré Beaulieu

Marie-Désiré Martin-Beaulieu (11 April 1791 – 21 December 1863) was a French composer and concert organizer.

== Life ==
Born in Paris, Beaulieu was the son of an artillery officer and descendant of a rich cloth merchant family based in Niort. He adopted the name Beaulieu after the Beaulieu estate bought by his grandfather in 1761.

Beaulieu had violin lessons with a musician named Alliaume, a student of Isidore Bertheaume (about 1751–1802) and from 1803 with Rodolphe Kreutzer. Since 1805 he had composition lessons with Angelo Maria Benincori (1779–1821), later with Abbé Nicolas Roze. From 1809 he attended the class of Étienne-Nicolas Méhul at the Conservatoire de Paris. In 1811, he won the Premier Grand Prix de Rome with the cantata Héro et Léandre after a libretto by Jacques Bins de Saint-Victor.

However, he renounced his stay in Rome and settled with his wife Francoise Caroline Rouget de Gourcez in Niort, where her father had been mayor until the French Revolution. Nevertheless, he fulfilled his obligations as a winner of the Prix de Rome and sent several church music pieces to the Académie des Beaux-Arts. After the death of his teacher Méhul, he composed a Requiem in 1819, which was also performed in 1851 in memory of Kreutzer and in 1863 for his own funeral.

In 1827, he founded a "Société Philharmonique" in Niort, from which the "Association musicale de l'Ouest" was born in collaboration with the violinist and conductor Jules Norès. This was the first symphonic association in the region to organise concerts in Niort, La Rochelle, Angoulème, Rochefort, Poitiers and Limoges and to organise an annual musical congress. The society was active until 1879 and led among other things Mendelssohns' oratorios Paulus and Elias, Händels Alexander's Feast, Ludwig Wilhelm Maurers Symphonie concertante and Antonin Reicha's wind quintets.

In 1863 Beaulieu founded the Fondation Beaulieu in Paris, which he endowed by will with a capital of 100,000 francs. The foundation had a great influence on musical life in Paris until the First World War. Its chairmen were Ambroise Thomas (bis 1895), Henri Colmet-Daage (1896), Théodore Dubois (1897–1910) and Camille Saint-Saëns, the musical directors were Adolphe Deloffre (1864–73), Guillot de Sainbris (1874–87), Jules Danbé (1888–1905), Georges Marty (1905–08) and Gabriel Pierné.

Vocal music was at the centre of Beaulieu's compositional work. In addition to operas, cantatas and lyrical scenes, he composed secular and religious choral works as well as songs and romances with different accompaniments and two string quartets.

Interested in public life in his city, Beaulieu was a member of the city council of Niort from 1840 until his death in 1863.

== Works ==
- Alcyone, Scène dramatique (text by Antoine-Vincent Arnault), 1808
- Céphale, Kantate (text by Jean-Baptiste Rousseau), 1808
- Circé, Kantate, (text by J. B. Rousseau), 1809
- Cupidon pleurant Psyché, Scène dramatique (Text von Arnault) (1809)
- Marie-Stuart, Monologue lyrique für Stimme und Orchester (text by Victor-Joseph Étienne de Jouy), 1810
- Héro et Léandre, Kantate (text by Jacques Bins de Saint-Victor), 1810
- Que le Seigneur est bon for female choir and orchestra, 1810
- Présent de Dieux, 1810
- Miserere, 1812
- Sapho à Leucade, Lyrical scene (text by J. A. Vinaty), 1813
- Laudate Dominum in sanctis ejus for two choirs and two orchestras, 1813
- Domine salvum fac regem, 1814
- Jeanne d'Arc, Kantate, (text by J. A. Vinaty), 1817
- Messe de Requiem, 1819
- Anacréon, Oper, (text by Gentil Bernard), 1828
- Sixième ode sacrée (text by J. B. Rousseau), 1828
- Anacréon, Oper (text by Gentil Bernard), 1828
- Scène lyrique adressée à Mme la duchesse d'Angoulême à son passage à Niort, 1831
- La Prière des matelots, hymne à la Vierge, 1831
- Encore un hymne for five-part choir, 1833
- Fête bacchique, scene from a cantata by J. B. Rousseau, 1835
- Solo de cor avec accompagnement de piano, 1837
- Hymne pour la première communion for ensemble, soloists and female choir (text by Émile Deschamps), 1840
- Sombre Océan, for ensemble, choir and soloists, 1841
- Hymne du matin, oratorio for soloists, choir and large orchestra (text by Alphonse de Lamartine), 1843
- Cantique pour la fête de Sainte Anne, 1845
- Messe solennelle Oratorio for soloists, choir and orchestra, 1845
- Messe à trois voix for three sopranos and organ, 1845
- Ode à la charité, Mélodie religieuse for voice and piano, 1845
- Dithyrambe sur l'Immortalité de l'âme par Delille, oratorio, 1850
- L'Hymne à la nuit, oratorio (text by Lamertine), 1851
- L'Immortalité de l'Ame, oratorio, 1851
- La Charité, Hymne für Chor a cappella (text by J. A. Vinaty), 1852
- Jeanne d'Arc, Grande scène lyrique, 1853
- Philadelphie, Opera, 1855
- Marche pour l'Association normande composée à la demande de M. de Caumont, 1855
- Salve Regina for solo voice and organ, 1859
- O rives du Jourdain for four-part choir and orchestra (text by Jean Racine), 1860
- Messe à quatre voix et orchestre, 1862
