= Germaine Beaulieu =

Canadian writer

Germaine Beaulieu (born 1949 in Laval, Quebec) is a Canadian poet and novelist, who has lived in Montreal since 1966.

== Biography ==
Germaine Beaulieu has lived in Montreal since 1966. By attending a poetry reading by Greek poets in 1969 at Concordia University, where they read texts about the dictatorship of the colonels in Greece, she grasped the power and strength of words. Nicole Brossard then encouraged her to write.

She is the co-founder, alongside Hélène Lépine, of the Women’s Committee of the Quebec P.E.N. Center.

She was also a private practice psychologist for several years in Outremont (now retired).

== Writing and photography ==
She published her first poetry book in 1977 and has since authored around twenty publications. She wrote the novel Sortie d’elle(s) mutante as well as eighteen poetry collections, including Repères du silence (2013), Miroir du levant (2011), and Derrière la nuit (2021), all of which address themes of mourning and the apprehension of death. She also published a series of postcards illustrating poems from her collection De l’Absence à volonté (1996).

Germaine Beaulieu is also a photographer. Twelve of her photographs accompany her poetry book Aires sans distance (1988). An exhibition of photos/poems titled "Voix d'écho," consisting of thirty-seven photos, each linked to a poem from her book Trois voix l'écho (2000), was held in various cities in Quebec during the Trois-Rivières International Poetry Festival (2000). Several of her texts have been published in various literary magazines, including Exit, Arcade, Estuaire, and La Nouvelle Barre du jour. Some poems translated into English were also published in the magazine Dandelion.

According to the Literary Info Center of Quebec writers, "Through Germaine Beaulieu’s work, we observe a constant concern with themes of existence, reality, love, sensuality, absence, and the absolute, as well as a continuous desire for exploration."

== Bibliography ==
- Envoie ta foudre jusqu'à la mort, Abracadabra, poetry, Montreal, Québec, Canada, Pleine Lune editions, 1977, 96 pages
- Sortie d'elle (s) mutante, roman, Montreal, Quinze editions. 1980. "Réelles" collection.
- Archives distraites, poetry. Trois-Rivières, Quebec, Canada, Les Ecrits des Forges editions, 1984, 64 pages.
- Textures en textes, poetry, Montréal, Noroît editions, Montreal, Québec, Canada, 1986, 80 pages.
- Aires sans distance, Montréal, Noroît editions, Montreal, Québec Canada, 1988, 80 pages.
- Réelle distante, poetry, Trois-Rivières, Quebec, Canada, Les Ecrits des Forges editions. 1991, 88 pages.
- Voie lactée, poetry, Trois-Rivières, Québec, Canada, Les Ecrits des Forges editions. 1991, 64 pages.
- De L'Absence à volonté, poetry, Trois-Rivières, Québec, Canada Coédition : Les Écrits des Forges/proverbe editions(Paris). 1996, 140 pages.
- Série de douze cartes postales/ poèmes, Trois-Rivières, Québec, Canada, Éditions Les Écrits des Forges, 1996,
- Entre deux gorgées de mer, Trois-Rivières, Québec, Canada, Les Ecrits des Forges editions, 1998, 105 pages.
- Trois voix l'écho, Trois-Rivières, Québec, Canada, Les Ecrits des Forges editions, 2000, 96 pages.
- Ailleurs au même instant, Trois-Rivières, Québec, Canada, Les Ecrits des Forges editions, 2002, 108 pages.
- D'acier de parfum de chair, Trois-Rivières, Québec, Canada, Les Ecrits des Forges editions, 2005, 93 pages.
- Avant la fin le temps, Trois-Rivières, Québec, Canada, Les Ecrits des Forges editions, 2008, 92 pages.
- Miroir du levant, Trois-Rivières, Québec, Canada, Les Ecrits des Forges editions, 2011, 108 pages.
- Repères du silence, Montréal, L'Hexagone editions, 2013, 120 pages
- Matière crue, Trois-Rivieres, Quebec, Canada, Les Ecrits des Forges editions, 2016.
