= Anthony Bewley =

Anthony Bewley (May 22, 1804 – September 13, 1860) was an abolitionist pastor who was lynched in Fort Worth, Texas for his anti-slavery views.

Bewley was born in Tennessee and became a minister for the Methodist Episcopal Church as a young man. After serving in Virginia and marrying his wife Jane Winton, the Bewleys moved to Missouri. In 1844, the church split over the issue of slavery, with Bewley rejecting the move of the Missouri church to join the pro-slavery Methodist Episcopal Church, South.

In 1858, the Bewleys and their children moved to Johnson City, Texas, west of Austin. Later the next year, the Bewleys fled when pro-slavery activists disrupted a church conference. The Bewleys returned, however, in spring 1860.

That year, as pro-slavery Texans sought out those who might harbor abolitionist sympathies, newspapers published an alleged letter to Bewley where another minister encouraged him to promote abolitionism. Bewley denied that the letter was authentic, but, fearing for his life, he fled for Kansas. Bewley departed under cover of darkness the same day that a mob lynched Unionist William Crawford. A posse chased him, and brought him back to Fort Worth on September 13. 1860. That same evening, a mob descended on the jail, seized him, and hanged him from a nearby tree.

Bewley was hanged from a pecan tree near the intersection of White Settlement road and Jacksboro road and left for over a day. Following his lynching, Bewley was placed in a shallow grave where his bones were still visible. As his bones became more exposed, unknown individuals displayed the bones on the roof of a local merchant's warehouse where children would play with them and rearrange the skeleton.
