= James G. Bourland =

American politician (1801–1879)

James G. Bourland (August 11, 1801 – August 20, 1879) was an American businessman and politician. Born in South Carolina, he lived in the Upper South until settling in Lamar County, Texas, in 1837. He raised troops for the Mexican–American War, and served in the Confederate army. He was involved in the Great Hanging at Gainesville.

== Early life ==
Bourland was born in Pendleton, South Carolina and lived in Kentucky and Tennessee. He moved to what is now Lamar County, Texas in 1837, where he was a trader in horses and slaves. Bourland also owned a plantation in Cooke County, Texas and was in the mercantile business.

During the Mexican–American War of 1846, he organized the Third Regiment, Texas Mounted Rifles. This meant that he paid to outfit them and likely also to provide them with horses. Bourland was elected and served a two-year term in the Texas Senate during this period: elected in 1846, he served into early 1849.

During the American Civil War, Bourland served as provost marshal and served in the Confederate Army in his area. On the morning of October 1, 1862, Colonel Bourland marshalled state troops to begin arresting suspected Unionists in the Cooke County area, an action that culminated in the Great Hanging at Gainesville.
