= Pecan Point, Texas =

Trading post and ghost town in Texas, US

Pecan Point
- Trading Post and ghost town
- Location within Texas Location within the United States
- Coordinates: 33°44′20″N 94°47′20″W
- Country: United States
- States: Texas and Oklahoma
- Counties: Red River and McCurtain

Pecan Point is a trading post and ghost town along the Red River of the South, in McCurtain County, Oklahoma, and Red River County, Texas, United States.

== History ==
Previously inhabited by the Natchitoches people, the first settlers were fugitives who arrived in summer 1811. The fugitives abandoned the site by War of 1812 veterans Alex and George Wetmore established the trading post. Another post was later established by William Mabbitt. Settlers Charles Burkham, Claiborne Wright and Walter Pool, and five Indian traders and twelve families settled between 1816 and 1818.

In 1825, Pecan Point's land was bought by Jacob Black, who sold it to Robert Hamilton in January 1835. He used the land to establish Pecan Point Plantation, which was destroyed by the changing river course.
