= Bolon B. Turner =

American judge (1897–1987)

Bolon Bailey Turner (March 13, 1897 – November 22, 1987) was a judge of the United States Tax Court from 1934 to 1968.

== Early life, education, and career ==
Born in Little Rock, Arkansas, Turner served in the United States Army during World War I, entering as a private and achieving the rank of second lieutenant. He received an A.B. and an LL.B. from the University of Arkansas in 1922, and was employed in the income tax unit of the Bureau of Internal Revenue from 1920 to 1923, where he assisted in drafting of the Revenue Act of 1924, and in the preparation of regulations under that act. He received an LL.M. from the George Washington University Law School in 1924.

He was an attorney for the United States Board of Tax Appeals from 1924 to 1927. He entered the private practice of law in Little Rock in 1927, and in 1929 organized the income tax division of the Department of Revenues for the State of Arkansas, and supervised drafting of regulations under Arkansas Income Tax Act. He remained in private practice until 1933, when he was appointed as an attorney in the Office of the Secretary of the Treasury, where he was employed chiefly on matters pertaining to revenue legislation, assisting in the drafting of the Revenue Act of 1934.

== Tax Court service and later life ==
On June 11, 1934, President Franklin D. Roosevelt appointed Turner to a seat on the United States Board of Tax Appeals (later the Tax Court). This was one of several appointments which went against a previously observed Senate Resolution prohibiting the appointment to that body of persons recently employed by the Treasury Department. In a noted 1935 case, Turner ruled that former United States Secretary of the Treasury Andrew Mellon was permitted to take tax deductions for the donation of paintings to museums. Turner was reappointed for two succeeding terms, on June 2, 1946, and June 2, 1958, serving as chief judge from 1945 to 1949.

In 1950, Turner married Essie Lee Pearson Tusler of Gaithersburg, Maryland. Although his last term was set to expire on June 1, 1970, Turner took senior status in 1962, and thereafter served as national president of Sigma Chi fraternity from 1963 to 1967.

Turner developed Alzheimer's disease and died in an Annandale, Virginia, nursing home, at the age of 90.
