= Herbert Chabot =

American judge (1931–2022)

Herbert L. Chabot

Senior Judge of the United States Tax Court
- In office April 2, 1993 – October 20, 1993
- In office June 30, 2001 – January 1, 2016

Judge of the United States Tax Court
- In office April 3, 1978 – April 2, 1993
- Appointed by: Jimmy Carter
- Preceded by: Bruce Forrester
- In office October 20, 1993 – June 30, 2001
- Appointed by: Bill Clinton
- Succeeded by: Joseph Robert Goeke

Personal details
- Born: July 17, 1931 Bronx, New York, U.S.
- Died: October 11, 2022 (aged 91) Aspen Hill, Maryland, U.S.
- Education: City College of New York (B.A. 1952); Columbia Law School (LL.B. 1957); Georgetown University Law Center (LL.M. 1964)

Herbert Leonard Chabot (July 17, 1931 – October 11, 2022) was an American judge of the United States Tax Court.

== Biography ==
Chabot was born in The Bronx and graduated from Stuyvesant High School in 1948. He received a B.A., cum laude, from the City College of New York in 1952, an LL.B. from Columbia University in 1957; and an LL.M. in Taxation from Georgetown University, 1964. He served in the United States Army for 2 years, and in the Army Reserves (civil affairs units) for 8 years. He served on Legal Staff, American Jewish Congress, from 1957 to 1961; was attorney-adviser to Judge Russell E. Train, from 1961 to 1965; and on the Congressional Joint Committee on Taxation, 1965–78. He was an elected Delegate to the Maryland Constitutional Convention, from 1967 to 1968; adjunct professor, National Law Center, George Washington University, from 1974 to 1983; Member of American Bar Association, Tax Section, and Federal Bar Association.

Chabot was appointed by President Jimmy Carter as Judge, United States Tax Court, on April 3, 1978, for a term ending April 2, 1993. He served as Senior Judge on recall performing judicial duties until his reappointment by Bill Clinton was confirmed on October 20, 1993, for a term ending October 19, 2008. He retired on June 30, 2001, but was recalled on July 1, 2001, to again serve as Senior Judge. He fully retired from the court on January 1, 2016.

Chabot died from complications of COVID-19 on October 11, 2022, at the age of 91.
