= Ronald L. Buch =

American tax court judge

Ronald Buch
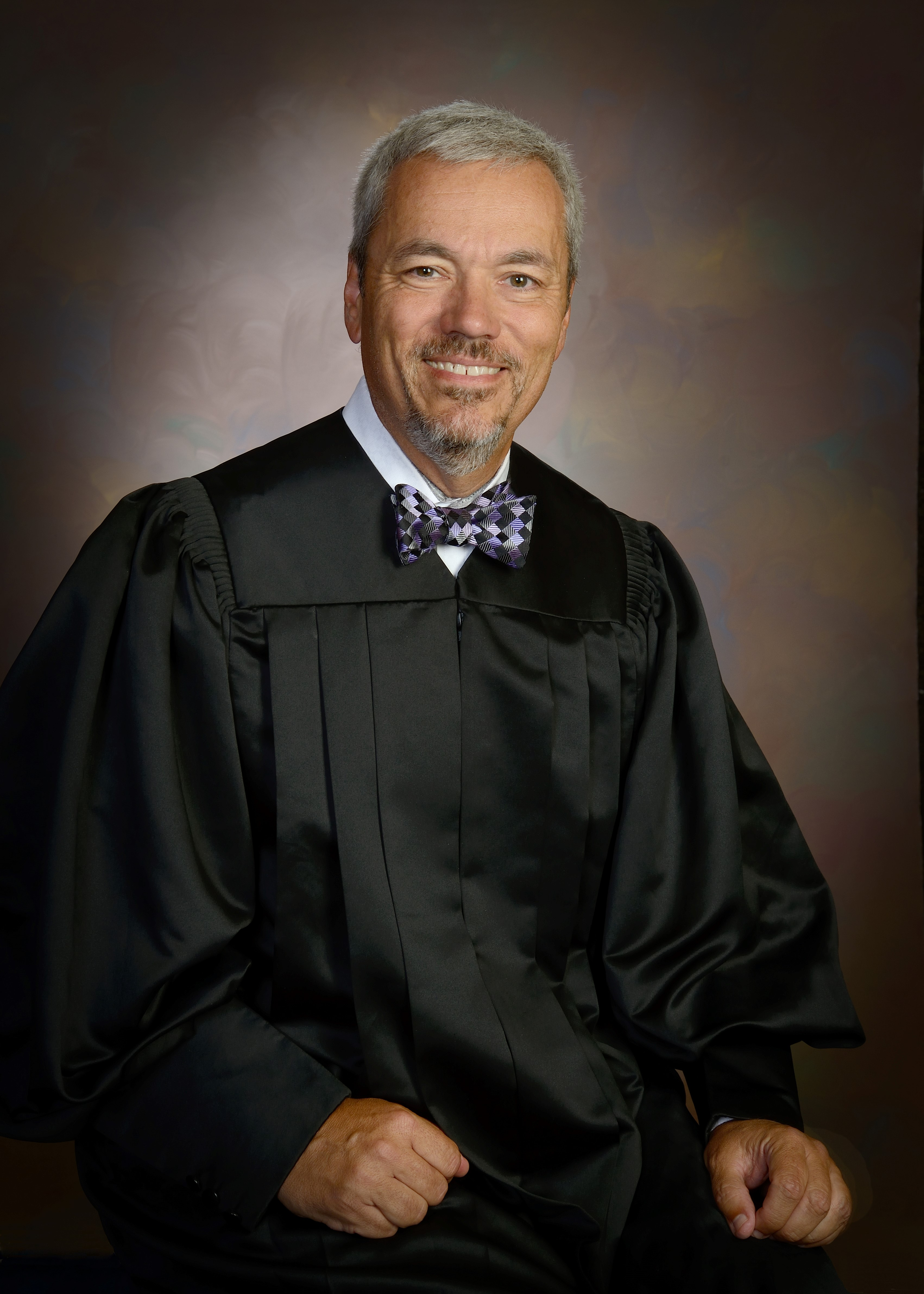

Judge of the United States Tax Court
- Incumbent
- Assumed office January 14, 2013
- Appointed by: Barack Obama
- Preceded by: David Laro

Personal details
- Born: Ronald Lee Buch Flint, Michigan, U.S.
- Education: Northwood University, Michigan (BBA); Michigan State University (JD); Capital University (LLM)

Ronald Lee Buch is a judge of the United States Tax Court.

== Biography ==
=== Early life and education ===
Buch was born on September 20, 1965, in Flint, Michigan. He received his Juris Doctor in 1993, from the Detroit College of Law. He received a Master of Laws degree in 1994, from the Capital University Law School. Both of his law degrees were earned with a concentration in taxation. He served as research editor of the Detroit College of Law Review from 1992 to 1993. He was an Ohio Tax Review Fellow from 1993 to 1994.

=== Professional career ===
Buch served as a consultant at KPMG LLP's Washington National Tax office from 1995 to 1997. He served at the Internal Revenue Service as an attorney advisor from 1997 to 2000 and as senior legal counsel from 2000 to 2001. During his service with the IRS, he represented the IRS in cases before the United States Tax Court. He served at McKee Nelson LLP as an associate from 2001 to 2005 and as a partner from 2005 to 2009. He served as a partner at Bingham McCutchen LLP from its acquisition of his former firm in 2009 until 2013. His focus in private practice was tax controversy matters. During his time in private practice, he also served as an adjunct law professor at Georgetown University Law Center, teaching classes related to tax law.

== Tax Court service ==
On September 15, 2011, President Barack Obama nominated Buch to serve as a judge of the United States Tax Court, to the seat vacated by Judge David Laro, whose term had expired. His nomination received a hearing before the United States Senate Committee on Finance on December 11, 2012, and was reported favorably on December 21, 2012. His nomination was confirmed by the United States Senate on January 1, 2013. He received his commission on January 14, 2013. His commission will expire on January 13, 2028, at which time his fifteen-year term will end.

Legal offices
Preceded by David Laro	Judge of the United States Tax Court; 2013–present	Incumbent
