= Judge Tyson =

Judge Tyson may refer to:

- John A. Tyson (1873–1971), judge of the United States Tax Court
- Ralph E. Tyson (1948–2011), judge of the United States District Court for the Middle District of Louisiana
