= C. P. Smith =

C. P. Smith may refer to:

- Charles P. Smith (1878–1948), American judge
- Cotesworth P. Smith (1807–1862), American judge
- Curtis P. Smith (1863–1919), American municipal mayor
