= Van Fossen =

Van Fossen or Van Fossan is a surname. Notable people with the surname include:

- Jamie Van Fossen (born 1960), American politician
- Jim Van Fossen, American politician, father of Jamie
- Theodore Van Fossen, architect of Rush Creek Village, Ohio
- Ernest H. Van Fossan (1888–1970), judge of the United States Tax Court
- Nadine van Fossan (1928–1990), convicted of the murder of Sylvia Likens
- Judy Van Fossan, flower shop owner noted for receiving a large volume of misdialed calls
- David B. Fossan, 1984 inductee to the List of fellows of the American Physical Society (1972–1997)
