= Judge Hoyt =

Judge Hoyt may refer to:

- Austin Hoyt (1915–1976), judge of the United States Tax Court
- Kenneth M. Hoyt (born 1948), judge of the United States District Court for the Southern District of Texas

== See also ==
- Justice Hoyt (disambiguation)
