= Percy W. Phillips =

American judge (1892–1969)

Percy Wilson Phillips (June 2, 1892 – May 15, 1969) was a judge of the United States Board of Tax Appeals (later the United States Tax Court) from 1924 to 1931.

== Early life, education, and military service ==
Born in Southampton, New York, Phillips attended Southampton High School and received his law degree from Cornell Law School in 1915. He served in the United States Army during World War I, achieving the rank of first lieutenant of field artillery, and after the war receiving a promotion to captain of field artillery. He then joined the law firm of Sackett, Chapman, Brown and Cross, in Manhattan, specializing in income tax and inheritance tax matters.

== Board of Tax Appeals and later life ==
In March 1925, Phillips was appointed to the Board by President Calvin Coolidge. A 1925 report of his early activities with the board read as follows:

Percy Phillips of Southhampton, who was appointed last March by President Coolidge as one of the 15 members of the United States Board of Tax Appeals upon recommendation of Congressman Bacon and Senator Wadsworth has returned to Washington after absence of three months in the Northwest and on the Pacific Coast. Shortly after taking office Mr. Phillips was designated as one of the three members to constitute the first division of the Tax Board to hold hearings outside of Washington, the other two members being A. E. Graupner of San Francisco and C. M. Trammell of Florida. The division left Washington on May 2 and held hearings at Milwaukee, St. Paul, Seattle, Portland, San Francisco and Los Angeles. At each of these cities the members were called upon to speak before organizations of business men, luncheon clubs, chambers of commerce, legal associations and societies of public accountants upon the function and work of the tax board. Mr. Phillips reports a strenuous but nevertheless interesting trip.

Phillips was reappointed for a 10-year term in June 1926, but resigned in 1931 to form a new law firm with fellow board member James S.Y. Ivins and tax lawyer Richard Barker, called Ivins Phillips Barker. He remained in practice for decades thereafter, and in 1956 successfully represented the H. J. Heinz Co. in a suit to recover tax overpayments from the mid 1940s.

== Personal life and death ==
On August 15, 1920, Phillips married Margaret Richards Terrell, a nurse, of Riverhead, New York, with whom he had three daughters and a son. He died in Washington, D.C., at the age of 76, and was buried in Arlington National Cemetery.
