= Judge Forrester =

Judge Forrester may refer to:

- Bruce Forrester (1908–1995), judge of the United States Tax Court
- J. Owen Forrester (1939–2014), judge of the United States District Court for the Northern District of Georgia
