= Lapsley W. Hamblen Jr. =

American judge (1926–2012)

Lapsley Walker Hamblen Jr.
- Born: December 25, 1926; Chattanooga, Tennessee, U.S.
- Died: September 10, 2012 (aged 85); Falls Church, Virginia, U.S.
- Education: University of Virginia
- Occupation: Judge
- Title: Judge of the United States Tax Court
- Term: 1982–1996
- Predecessor: Judge Sheldon V. Ekman

Lapsley Walker Hamblen Jr. (December 25, 1926 – September 10, 2012) was a judge of the United States Tax Court from 1982 to 1996.

Born in Chattanooga, Tennessee, Hamblen graduated from The McCallie School in Chattanooga in 1943 and served in the U.S. Navy towards the end of World War II, from 1945 to 1946. He received a B.A. from the University of Virginia in 1949, and an LL.B. from the same institution in 1953, where he was president of his senior law class. He was a member of the Order of the Coif, Raven Society, Omicron Delta Kappa, Phi Alpha Delta, and Phi Delta Theta. He gained admission to the bar in West Virginia in 1954.

He was a trial attorney in the Atlanta, Georgia Office of Chief Counsel, Internal Revenue Service from 1955 to 1956, and an attorney-advisor to Tax Court Judge Craig S. Atkins from 1956 to 1957. He then entered the private practice of law in Lynchburg, Virginia, as a member of the firm of Caskie, Frost, Hobbs and Hamblen and predecessors, where he remained until 1982. He served as Deputy Assistant Attorney General in the Tax Division of the United States Department of Justice in 1982, until he was appointed by President Ronald Reagan to serve as a judge of the U.S. Tax Court. Hamblen took the oath of office on September 14, 1982, for a 15-year term to succeed Judge Sheldon V. Ekman, who had died. Hamblen was elected chief judge for a 2-year term beginning June 1, 1992. Hamblen attained Senior Status in 1996, and retired from the court entirely on June 30, 2000.

Hamblen had three sons by his first wife. After their marriage ended, he married Claudia Royster Terrell of Lynchburg, Virginia, in 1971, who survived him. Hamblen died from cardiac disease at his home in Falls Church, Virginia, at the age of 85.
