= Lewis Carluzzo =

American judge (born 1949)

Lewis R. Carluzzo (born 1949 in New Jersey), is a special trial judge of the United States Tax Court.

Carluzzo received undergraduate and law degrees from Villanova University, in 1971 and 1974, and was admitted to the New Jersey state bar in 1974. He served as a law clerk to a New Jersey Superior Court judge. He was associated with a law firm in Bridgeton, New Jersey starting in 1975, also serving as a city prosecutor. From 1977 until appointment as Special Trial Judge, he was employed by the Office of Chief Counsel, Internal Revenue Service, as an attorney in the Washington, DC, District Counsel's Office. In 1983, he was appointed Special Trial Attorney on staff of the Associate Chief Counsel, Litigation.

From 1992 to 1994, he was assigned to the Office of Special Counsel, Large Case. He was appointed Special Trial Judge, United States Tax Court, on August 7, 1994, and Chief Special Trial Judge from 2007.

In 2020, Carluzzo received the J. Edgar Murdock Award for distinguished service to the Tax Court.
