= Graydon G. Withey =

American judge (1910–1994)

Graydon Gilluly Withey (June 16, 1910 – August 8, 1994) was a judge of the United States Tax Court from 1952 to 1974.

Born in Reed City, Michigan, Withey attended public schools in Reed City and Flint, Michigan, and attended the General Motors Institute in Flint, Michigan, before reading law under his father, Charles A. Withey, a circuit judge in the State of Michigan.

After gaining admission to the bar in Michigan in 1933, Withey practiced law in Flint from 1933 to 1937, and again from 1939 to 1949. He was the chief assistant prosecuting attorney for Genesee County, Michigan, from 1937 to 1938. In 1944 he was nominated for prosecuting attorney, and in 1949 was appointed Deputy Attorney General of Michigan. On April 16, 1952, President Harry S. Truman nominated Withey to a seat on the United States Tax Court vacated by the retirement of Judge Richard L. Disney. Withey was confirmed by the Senate on May 30, 1952, and took the oath of office on June 16, 1952, for a term of eight years. He was reappointed on June 2, 1960, for a term expiring June 1, 1972.

He was recalled to service on June 2, 1972, with the termination of this recall coming on March 31, 1974.

Withey married Edna B. Leonard, with whom he had three daughters and two sons.
