= Courtney Jones =

Courtney Jones may refer to:

- Courtney Jones (figure skater) (born 1933), British ice dancer
- Courtney Jones (Australian footballer) (born 2000), Australian rules footballer
- Courtney Jones (soccer) (born 1990), American soccer player
- Courtney Jones (soccer, born 1998), American soccer player for Lexington SC (women)
- Courtney Dunbar Jones, American judge on the U.S. Tax Court
