= John A. Tyson =

American judge (1873–1971)

John Ambrose Tyson (December 12, 1873 – November 14, 1971) was a judge of the United States Tax Court from 1935 to 1950.

Born in Denmark, Tennessee, Tyson attended the local schools and received a B.S. around 1894 from Jackson Male Academy (later renamed Union University), in Jackson, Tennessee, and an LL.B. from Cumberland University in Lebanon, Tennessee in 1898. He entered into the practice of law in Jackson, Tennessee and served in the Tennessee General Assembly from 1903 to 1905, where he was Chairman of the Ways and Means Committee. He moved to Greenwood, Mississippi in 1905, and served in the Mississippi Legislature from 1908 to 1910. He was commissioned as a Major in the Judge Advocate General's Department during World War I, in July 1918, serving in Washington, D.C. for the duration. He was promoted to be a Lieutenant Colonel in June 1919, receiving an honorable discharge later in 1919. He also served as Chief Counsel to the Board of Contract Adjustment for the War Department from the spring of 1919 until early 1921.

Tyson then returned to private practice in Mississippi until 1935. From around 1923 to 1935, he was counsel to the Yazoo-Mississippi Delta Levee Board. On December 16, 1935, President Franklin D. Roosevelt appointed Tyson to a seat on the Tax Court vacated by the sudden death of John J. Marquette, where Tyson remained until his retirement on June 2, 1950.

Tyson was married to Annabel Broadley, who predeceased him. He died at his home in Washington, D.C., and was buried at Arlington National Cemetery. was succeeded on the court by Norman O. Tietjens.
