= Maurice B. Foley =

American judge (born 1960)

Maurice Foley
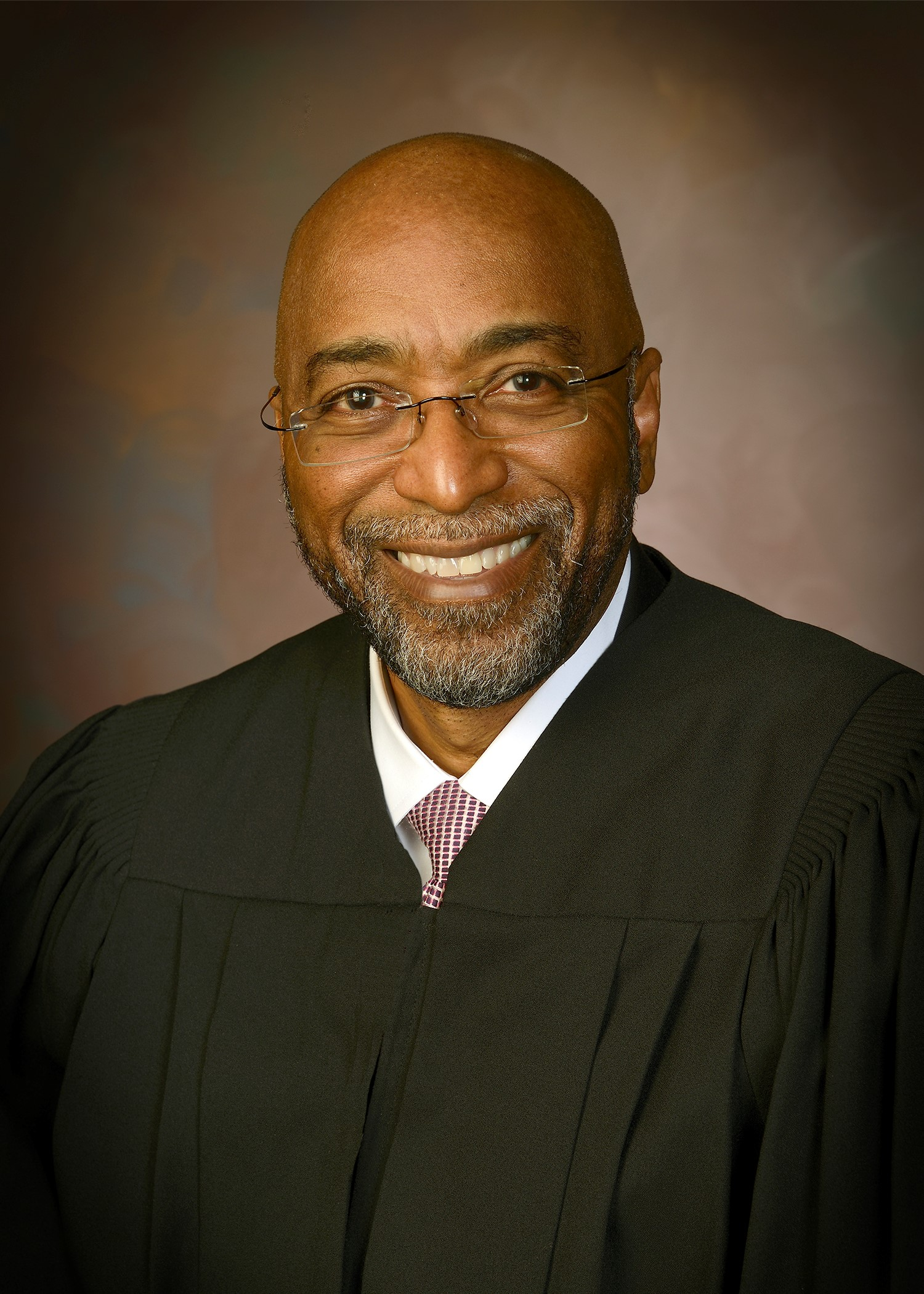
- Foley in 2022

Senior Judge of the United States Tax Court
- Incumbent
- Assumed office March 29, 2025

Chief Judge of the United States Tax Court
- In office June 1, 2018 – May 31, 2022
- Preceded by: L. Paige Marvel
- Succeeded by: Kathleen Kerrigan

Judge of the United States Tax Court
- In office November 25, 2011 – March 29, 2025
- Appointed by: Barack Obama
- Preceded by: Himself
- Succeeded by: Vacant
- In office April 9, 1995 – April 8, 2010
- Appointed by: Bill Clinton
- Preceded by: Charles Clapp
- Succeeded by: Himself

Personal details
- Born: Maurice Brian Foley; March 28, 1960 (age 66) Belleville, Illinois, U.S.
- Education: Swarthmore College (BA); University of California, Berkeley (JD); Georgetown University (LLM)

Maurice Brian Foley (born March 28, 1960) is a senior judge of the United States Tax Court.

Foley received a Bachelor of Arts degree from Swarthmore College, a Juris Doctor from UC Berkeley School of Law and a Master of Laws in taxation from Georgetown University Law Center. Prior to the appointment to the court, he was an attorney for the Legislation and Regulations Division of the Internal Revenue Service, Tax Counsel for the United States Senate Committee on Finance, and Deputy Tax Legislative Counsel in the U.S. Treasury's Office of Tax Policy. He was appointed by President Bill Clinton as Judge, United States Tax Court, on April 9, 1995, for a term ending April 8, 2010. Foley was the first African-American appointed to the United States Tax Court. He was reappointed on November 25, 2011, for a term ending November 24, 2026. Foley is also an adjunct professor at the University of Colorado School of Law. Foley is currently an adjunct professor at the University of Baltimore. On February 26, 2018, it was announced he would become the next Chief Judge of the Tax Court, effective June 1, 2018. On February 21, 2020, he was re-elected to a second two-year term effective June 1, 2020, his term as chief ended on May 31, 2022.

== See also ==
- List of African American jurists
- List of African American federal judges

== Attribution ==
Material on this page was copied from the website of the United States Tax Court, which is published by a United States government agency, and is therefore in the public domain.

Legal offices
Preceded by Charles Clapp	Judge of the United States Tax Court; 1995–2010	Succeeded by Himself
Preceded by Himself	Judge of the United States Tax Court; 2011–2025	Vacant
Preceded by L. Paige Marvel	Chief Judge of the United States Tax Court; 2018–2022	Succeeded by Kathleen Kerrigan
