= Arnold R. Baar =

American judge (1891–1954)

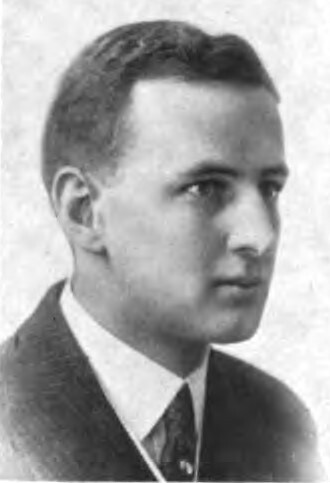

Judge of the United States Tax Court
- In office April 1, 1954 – October 14, 1954
- Appointed by: Dwight D. Eisenhower
- Preceded by: Samuel B. Hill
- Succeeded by: Allin H. Pierce

Personal details
- Born: Arnold Rudolph Baar; June 12, 1891 Jersey City, New Jersey, U.S.
- Died: October 14, 1954 (aged 63) Evanston, Illinois, U.S.
- Education: University of Chicago

Arnold Rudolph Baar (June 12, 1891 – October 14, 1954) was a judge of the United States Tax Court in 1954.

Born in Jersey City, New Jersey, Baar received his J.D. from the University of Chicago Law School in 1914, and commenced the practice of law that same year.

He joined the Chicago firm of Kixmiller, Baar and Morris in 1917, and eventually became a partner, serving in that role for many years. He and firm partner George Maurice Morris co-authored a book, Hidden Taxes in Corporate Reorganization. In 1954, President Dwight D. Eisenhower appointed Baar to a seat on the United States Tax Court, with Baar taking office in April of that year. Baar's appointment was for a term ending in 1960, but Baar died from a heart ailment after serving for only six months, at Evanston Hospital in Evanston, Illinois.
