= Judge Shields =

Judge Shields may refer to:

- Perry Shields (1925–2002), judge of the United States Tax Court
- William Bayard Shields (1780–1823), judge of the United States District Court for the District of Mississippi
