= Theodore Tannenwald Jr. =

American judge (1916–1999)

Theodore Tannenwald Jr. (July 28, 1916 – January 17, 1999) was a judge of the United States Tax Court from 1965 to 1983.

Born in Valatie, New York, Tannenwald received an A.B., summa cum laude in political science and mathematics, from Brown University 1936, A.B., and an LL.B., magna cum laude, from Harvard Law School in 1939, where he was awarded a Fay Diploma for having the highest 3-year average in his class, and was a note editor on the Harvard Law Review. He gained admission to the bar in New York the same year, and worked for the law firm of Weil, Gotshal & Manges in New York from 1939 to 1942, when he took leave from the firm to hold a series of government positions. He was Principal Assistant, Lend-Lease Administration, and Acting Assistant Chief, Foreign Funds Control Division, Department of State, 1942 to 1943, and Special Consultant to the Secretary of War, 1943 to 1945.

He formally returned to the law firm in 1947, but also served as a consultant to Secretary of Defense James Forrestal from 1946 to 1949, and Counsel to the Special Assistant to President Truman, W. Averell Harriman from 1950 to 1951. He again took leave from the firm to serve as assistant director for Mutual Security from 1951 to 1953. He then returned to Weil, Gotshal & Manges until 1965. He was also a member of President Kennedy's Task Force on Foreign Assistance and Special Assistant to the Secretary of State in 1961.

In 1965, President Lyndon B. Johnson appointed Tannenwald to a seat on the United States Tax Court for term expiring June 1, 1974, to succeed Judge Clarence V. Opper, deceased. Tannenwald was then reappointed by President Richard Nixon for a 15-year term expiring June 1, 1989, but retired June 30, 1983. He was also a professional lecturer at the George Washington University Law School from 1968 to 1976, and at the University of Miami School of Law in 1976.

He married Selma Peterfreund, with whom he had two sons, Peter and Robert.
