= Arnold Raum =

American judge

- Born: October 27, 1908; Lynn, Massachusetts
- Died: February 13, 1999; Miami, Florida

Abraham Arnold Raum (October 27, 1908, in Lynn, Massachusetts – February 13, 1999, in Miami, Florida) served as a judge on the United States Tax Court from 1950 to 1998. He began working for the United States government in 1932, as an attorney for the Reconstruction Finance Corporation. From 1934 to 1950, he worked in the United States Department of Justice, as a special assistant in the Tax Division (1934–1939), as special assistant to the U.S. District Attorney for Louisiana (1939), and as Deputy Solicitor General (1939–1950).

Raum was born to Isaac and Ida Raum on October 27, 1908, in Lynn, Massachusetts. He graduated from Harvard University in 1929, and from Harvard University Law School in 1932. Shortly after completing law school, he began working for the Reconstruction Finance Corporation. As special assistant to the U.S. District Attorney for Louisiana, he headed investigations into fraud and tax evasion by Louisiana officials.

As Deputy Solicitor General, Raum argued numerous cases before the Supreme Court. They included United States v. State of California (1947), which established that the federal government rather than the California state government owned land under the ocean off the state's coast. Raum also played a major role in preparing the government's case in Hirabayashi v. United States and argued cases before the Supreme Court establishing the constitutionality of Social Security. Raum argued more tax cases before the Supreme Court than any person before him.

In 1950, Raum was appointed to the United States Tax Court by President Harry Truman. As Tax Court judge, Raum presided over the 1957 trial of former New York City mayor William O'Dwyer. Raum took senior judge status in 1978 and continued to serve on the court until 1998.
