= Charles P. Smith (judge) =

American judge (born c. 1879)

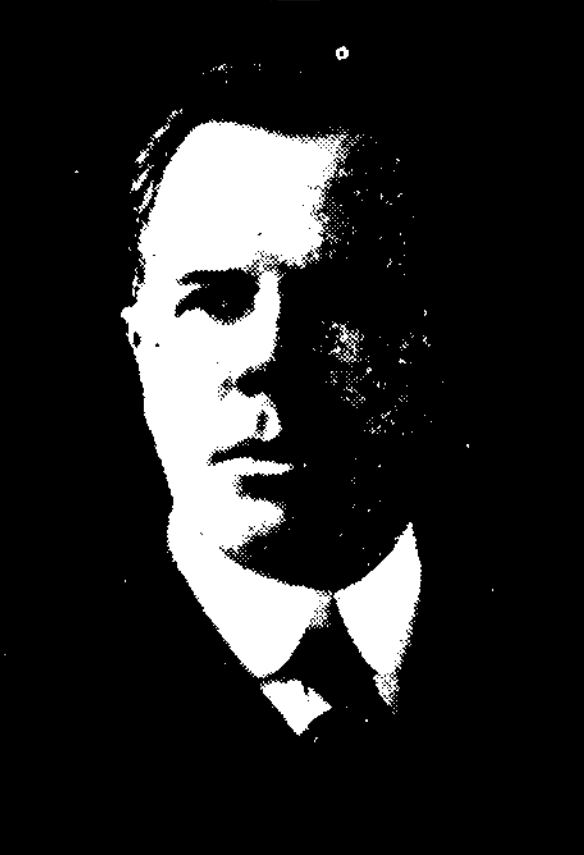
- Charles P. Smith in 1926

Judge of the United States Board of Tax Appeals
- In office July 1924 – 1946
- Nominated by: Calvin Coolidge
- Preceded by: Board established (Original member)
- Succeeded by: Clarence P. LeMire

Personal details
- Born: December 12, 1878 Windham, New Hampshire, U.S.
- Died: July 6, 1948 (aged 69)
- Education: Brown University (A.B.); George Washington University

Charles Perley Smith (December 12, 1878 – July 6, 1948) was a judge of the United States Board of Tax Appeals, and later the United States Tax Court from 1924 to 1946.

Smith received an A.B. from Brown University, and studied law at Brown and George Washington University.

Born in Windham, New Hampshire, Smith later resided in Boston. From 1905 until his appointment to the Bureau of Internal Revenue in 1914, Smith was employed in the Census Bureau. Following his transfer to the solicitor's office he served for a time as head of one of the interpretative divisions. He was appointed assistant to the commissioner June 14, 1921, in which capacity he served until his appointment to the Committee on Appeals and Reviews on November 2, 1922. On December 1, 1921, Mr. Smith was also named as a member of the tax simplification board.

He was one of the original twelve members appointed to the Board by President Calvin Coolidge, and one of a group of five appointed "from the Bureau of Internal Revenue". In 1942, the Board was converted to an Article I federal court, and Smith was one of only two of the original Board members to continue on to the Tax Court. Smith remained on the Tax Court until 1946, when he left to serve as a member of the Bureau's council to administer claims for relief from the excess profit tax.
