= Courtney Dunbar Jones =

American judge (born 1978)

Courtney Jones
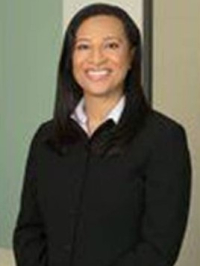
- Jones in 2018

Judge of the United States Tax Court
- Incumbent
- Assumed office August 9, 2019
- Appointed by: Donald Trump
- Preceded by: John O. Colvin

Personal details
- Born: Courtney Adele Dunbar; 1978 (age 47–48) Harrisburg, Pennsylvania, U.S.
- Education: Hampton University (BS); Harvard University (JD)

Courtney Adele Dunbar Jones (born 1978) is an American lawyer who serves as a judge of the United States Tax Court.

== Biography ==
Jones earned her Bachelor of Science, magna cum laude, from Hampton University and was the recipient of the President's Award for Exceptional Achievement. She earned her Juris Doctor from Harvard Law School, where she served for two years as the editor in chief of the Harvard BlackLetter Law Journal, (which has since been renamed the Harvard Journal on Racial & Ethnic Justice). She practiced for four years at Bird, Loechl, Brittain & McCants, a boutique law firm in Atlanta. Prior to joining the IRS she practiced for three years in the exempt organizations and intellectual property practice groups of the Washington, D.C.–based firm Caplin & Drysdale.

From 2011 to 2019, she was a senior attorney in the Tax-Exempt and Government Entities division in the Office of Chief Counsel of the Internal Revenue Service.

== United States Tax Court service ==
On January 23, 2018, President Donald Trump announced his intent to nominate Jones to an undetermined seat on the United States Tax Court. On January 24, 2018, her nomination was sent to the United States Senate. She was nominated to the seat vacated by Judge John O. Colvin, who assumed senior status in 2016. She was reported out of committee on December 13, 2018. On January 3, 2019, her nomination was returned to the President under Rule XXXI, Paragraph 6 of the United States Senate.

On February 6, 2019, her re-nomination was sent to the Senate. On March 26, 2019, her nomination was reported out of committee by a 28–0 vote. On August 1, 2019, her nomination was confirmed in the Senate by voice vote. She assumed office on August 9, 2019, for a term ending in 2034.

== Achievements ==
During law school, Jones was recognized for a variety of achievements; she was named a scholar in the Earl Warren Legal Training Program sponsored by the NAACP Legal Defense and Education Fund, and received the National Bar Institute African American Law Student Fellowship.

Legal offices
Preceded by John O. Colvin	Judge of the United States Tax Court; 2019–present	Incumbent
