= Charles D. Hamel =

American judge (1881–1970)

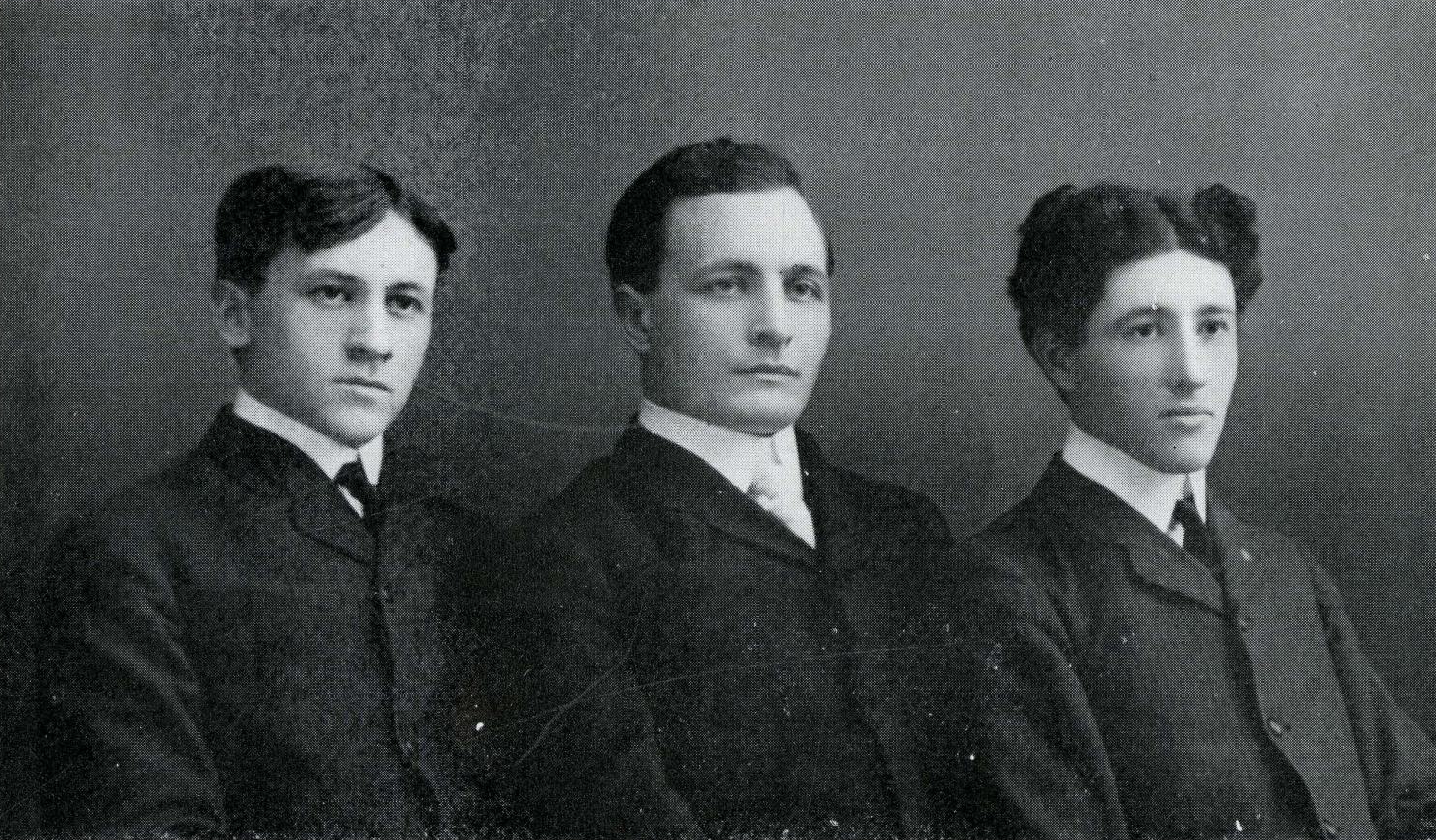
Left to right: E. Claude Carney, Ragnvald Nestos and Charles D. Hamel, members of the University of North Dakota debate team, 1904

Charles Dennis Hamel (November 25, 1881 – June 5, 1970) was a judge of the United States Board of Tax Appeals (later the United States Tax Court) from 1924 to 1925.

Born in Minneapolis, Minnesota, Hamel moved with his parents to Grafton, North Dakota. He graduated from the University of North Dakota, then traveled in 1906 to Washington, D.C., as the private secretary to Senator Henry C. Hansbrough. He enrolled at the National University Law School, graduating in 1907. After Hansbrough's term expired in 1909, Hamel worked for the United States Department of the Interior from April 1909 to October 1915. In October 1915, he was transferred to the United States Department of Justice. In October 1917, he was appointed special assistant to the Attorney-General, serving in that capacity until December 31, 1921. In February 1922, he entered the office of the Solicitor, United States Bureau of Internal Revenue. For several months beginning in November 1923, he was chairman of the special committee on appeals and review, and thereafter became the first chairman of the Board of Tax Appeals upon its organization. He was one of the original twelve members appointed to the Board, and one of a group of five appointed "from the Bureau of Internal Revenue". In March 1927, Hamel was hired to head the simplification division of the Joint Committee on Internal Revenue Taxation, which he left in 1929 to establish a law firm that would eventually become part of Foley & Lardner.

Hamel died in McLean, Virginia, at the age of 88.
