= John B. Milliken =

American judge (1893–1981)

John Barnes Milliken (December 10, 1893 – May 2, 1981) was a judge of the United States Board of Tax Appeals (later the United States Tax Court) from 1926 to 1929.

Born in Lewisville, Texas, Milliken attended Southwestern University, and then studied law at the University of Texas. He attempted to enlist in the U.S. armed forces during World War I, but was rated 4-F by the draft board due to flat feet, and instead moved to Washington, D.C. to work for the government in a legal capacity. He also engaged in post-graduate study at Columbia University between 1918 and 1922. He served for a time as Legal Advisor and Assistant Director of the U.S. Veterans Bureau, and as Assistant Counsel of the U.S. Shipping Board. In 1924, while employed as an attorney by the Internal Revenue Service, Milliken happened to take a phone call from President Calvin Coolidge, at a time when all of Milliken's supervisors were out of the office. Coolidge was sufficiently impressed with Milliken's tax policy advice that he appointed Milliken, then an Assistant Solicitor of Internal Revenue, to the Board of Tax Appeals in 1926.

Harold Dubroff and Brant J. Hellwig note that this nomination "provoked the fury of the Senators who had originally led the effort to prohibit appointment of former employees of the Bureau", further noting that:

These Senators, led by Carter Glass of Virginia and George W. Norris of Nebraska, believed that the Milliken nomination was inconsistent with the expressed "judgment of the Senate", and a resolution was proposed to express “the sense of the Senate” that future appointments to the Board should only be made in accordance with the provisions of the Senate amendment that had been eliminated by the conference from the 1926 Act.

Nevertheless, Milliken's nomination passed the Senate, and he served on the Board from 1926 until his resignation in 1931. After Milliken left government service, he moved to Los Angeles, California, where he entered into private practice, eventually representing celebrities including Tom Mix, Clark Gable, and Jack Benny. Millikin also lectured at USC Law School in the 1930s and 1940s, helping to establish a tax institute there in 1948. In 1979, he oversaw the purchase of the Belridge Oil Company and production rights on the South Belridge Oil Field by Royal Dutch Shell for $3.65 billion, which was the largest-ever fiscal transaction in the United States to that date.

Milliken died in his home in Los Angeles.
