= Joseph Robert Goeke =

American judge (born 1950)

Joe Goeke

Senior Judge of the United States Tax Court
- Incumbent
- Assumed office April 21, 2018

Judge of the United States Tax Court
- In office April 22, 2003 – April 21, 2018
- Appointed by: George W. Bush
- Preceded by: Herbert Chabot
- Succeeded by: Emin Toro

Personal details
- Born: Joseph Robert Goeke; June 22, 1950 (age 75) Covington, Kentucky, U.S.
- Spouse: Linda Powers
- Education: Xavier University (BS); University of Kentucky (JD)

Joseph Robert Goeke (born June 22, 1950) is an American lawyer who serves as a senior judge of the United States Tax Court.

Goeke received his Bachelor of Science, cum laude, from Xavier University in 1972, and his Juris Doctor from the University of Kentucky College of Law in 1975, where he was inducted into the Order of the Coif.

He worked as a trial attorney for the Internal Revenue Service from 1975-1988, for five years in New Orleans and then in Cincinnati, earning two promotions. He then left public service to become a partner, in the law firm of Mayer, Brown, Rowe & Maw, in Chicago.

On April 22, 2003, Goeke was appointed by President George W. Bush as Judge of the United States Tax Court for a term ending April 21, 2018. He assumed senior status on April 21, 2018, but continues to perform judicial duties as senior judge on recall.

In 2009, Goeke ruled that individuals may not deduct expenses on prostitutes and pornography under U.S. tax code.

== Bar memberships ==
- Admitted to the Illinois Bar and the Kentucky Bar.
- U.S. District Court for the Northern District of Illinois (Trial Bar).
- U.S. Court of Federal Claims.

Legal offices
| Preceded by Herbert Chabot | Judge of the United States Tax Court; 2003–2018 | Succeeded by Emin Toro |
