= United States Tax Court =

United States federal tribunal dealing with tax matters

- (T.C.)
- Location: United States Tax Court Building (Washington, D.C.)
- Appeals to: United States courts of appeals (Geographic circuits)
- Established: 1924
- Authority: Article I tribunal
- Created by: Revenue Act of 1924; 26 U.S.C. §§ 7441–7479
- Composition method: Presidential nomination with Senate advice and consent
- Judges: 19
- Judge term length: 15 years
- Chief Judge: Patrick Urda
- ustaxcourt.gov

The United States Tax Court (in case citations, T.C.) is a federal trial court of record established by Congress under Article I of the U.S. Constitution, section 8 of which provides (in part) that the Congress has the power to "constitute Tribunals inferior to the supreme Court". The Tax Court specializes in adjudicating disputes over federal income tax, generally prior to the time at which formal tax assessments are made by the Internal Revenue Service.

Though taxpayers may choose to litigate tax matters in a variety of legal settings, outside of bankruptcy, the Tax Court is the only forum in which taxpayers may do so without having first paid the disputed tax in full. Parties who contest the imposition of a tax may also bring an action in any United States District Court, or in the United States Court of Federal Claims; however, these venues require that the tax first be paid and that the party then file suit to recover the contested amount paid (the "full payment rule" of Flora v. United States).

== History ==
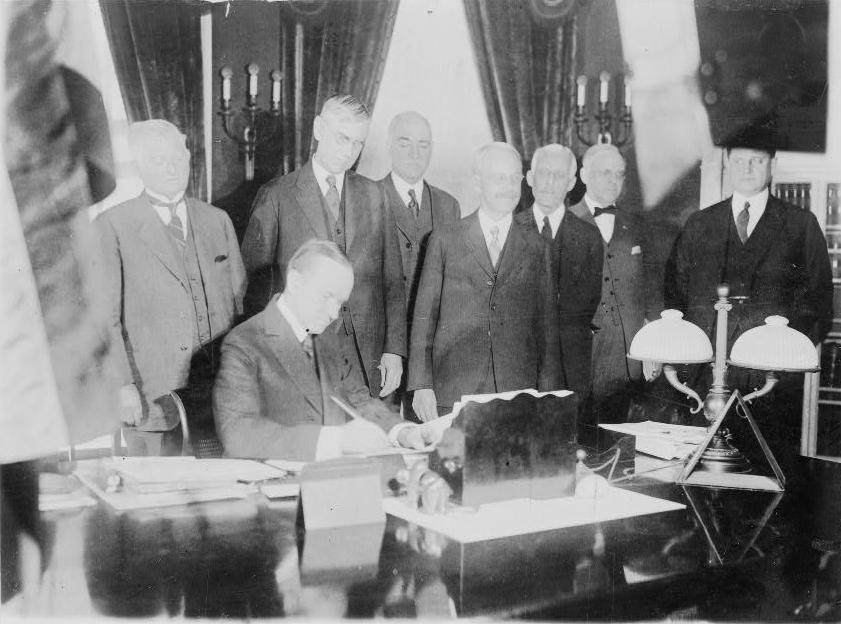
President Calvin Coolidge signing the income tax bill which established the U.S. Board of Tax Appeals; Andrew Mellon is the third figure from the right.

The first incarnation of the Tax Court was the "U.S. Board of Tax Appeals", established by Congress in the Revenue Act of 1924 (also known as the Mellon tax bill) in order to address the increasing complexity of tax-related litigation. Those serving on the Board were simply designated as "members". The members of the Board were empowered to select, on a biennial basis, one of their members as "chairman". In July 1924, President Calvin Coolidge announced the appointment of the first twelve appointees, of which seven were appointed from private life and five from the Bureau of Internal Revenue. Additional members were appointed in the fall, and the Board when fully constituted originally had 16 members, with Charles D. Hamel serving as the first Chairman. The Board was initially established as an "independent agency in the executive branch of the government". It was housed in the Internal Revenue Service Building in the Federal Triangle. The first session of the Board of Tax Appeals spanned July 16, 1924 to May 31, 1925.

In 1929, the United States Supreme Court ruled that the Board of Tax Appeals was not a "court," but was instead "an executive or administrative board, upon the decision of which the parties are given an opportunity to base a petition for review to the courts after the administrative inquiry of the Board has been had and decided".

In 1942, Congress passed the Revenue Act of 1942, renaming the Board as the "Tax Court of the United States". With this change, the Members became Judges and the Chairman became the Presiding Judge. By 1956, overcrowding and the desire to separate judicial and executive powers led to initial attempts to relocate the court. In 1962, Secretary of the Treasury Douglas Dillon appealed to the General Services Administration (GSA) to incorporate funds for the design of a new building in its upcoming budget. The GSA allocated $450,000, and commissioned renowned architect Victor A. Lundy, who produced a design that was approved in 1966. However, funding constraints brought on by the Vietnam War delayed the start of construction until 1972.

The Tax Court was again renamed to its current formal designation in the Tax Reform Act of 1969, changing it from an historically administrative court to a full judicial court. The completed United States Tax Court Building was dedicated on November 22, 1974, the fiftieth anniversary of the Revenue Act that created the court.

In 1991, the U.S. Supreme Court in Freytag v. Commissioner stated that the current United States Tax Court is an "Article I legislative court" that "exercises a portion of the judicial power of the United States". The Court explained the Tax Court "exercises judicial power to the exclusion of any other function" and that it "exercises its judicial power in much the same way as the federal district courts exercise theirs", This "exclusively judicial role distinguishes it from other non-Article III tribunals that perform multiple functions" Thus, Freytag concluded that the Tax Court exercises "judicial, rather than executive, legislative, or administrative, power". The Tax Court "remains independent of the Executive and Legislative Branches" in the sense that its decisions are not subject to appellate review by Congress, the President, or for that matter, Article III district courts. The President, however, may remove Tax Court judges, after notice and opportunity for public hearing, for "inefficiency," "neglect of duty," or "malfeasance in office".

Justice Scalia penned a separate concurrence for four justices in Freytag. These justices dissented as to the Court majority's rationale; they would have characterized the Tax Court's power as "executive" rather than "judicial". Scalia said that to him "it seem[ed]... entirely obvious that the Tax Court, like the Internal Revenue Service, the FCC, and the NLRB, exercises executive power". Notwithstanding Scalia's sharp dissents in landmark separation-of-powers cases such as Mistretta v. United States and Morrison v. Olson, Scalia apparently "describe[d] Freytag as the single worst opinion of his incumbency" on the U.S. Supreme Court.

Although the 2008 U.S. government directory of executive and legislative appointed officers ("the Plum Book") categorized the Tax Court as part of the legislative branch, the 2012 revised version removed the Tax Court and listed it under neither the legislative nor the executive branches.

In 1995, Maurice B. Foley became the first African American to serve as a judge on the court; and in 2014, Tamara W. Ashford became the first African-American woman to serve as a judge on the court.

Under an amendment to the Internal Revenue Code of 1986 enacted in late 2015, the U.S. Tax Court "is not an agency of, and shall be independent of, the executive branch of the Government". However, section 7443(f) of the Code still provides that a Tax Court judge may be removed by the President "for inefficiency, neglect of duty, or malfeasance in office".

== Jurisdiction of the Tax Court ==
The Tax Court provides a judicial forum in which affected persons can dispute tax deficiencies determined by the Commissioner of Internal Revenue prior to payment of the disputed amounts. The jurisdiction of the Tax Court includes, but is not limited to the authority to hear:

1. tax disputes concerning notices of deficiency
2. notices of transferee liability
3. certain types of declaratory judgment
4. readjustment and adjustment of partnership items
5. review of the failure to abate interest
6. administrative costs
7. worker classification
8. relief from joint and several liability on a joint return
9. review of certain collection actions

Congress amended the Internal Revenue Code, now codified in Internal Revenue Code section 7482, providing that decisions of the Tax Court may be reviewed by the applicable geographical United States Court of Appeals other than the Court of Appeals for the Federal Circuit. (See Article I and Article III tribunals).

"Small Tax Cases" are conducted under Internal Revenue Code section 7463, and generally involve amounts in controversy of $50,000 or less for any one tax year. The "Small Tax Case" procedure is available "at the option of the taxpayer". These cases are neither appealable nor precedential.

At times there have been efforts in Congress and the Tax Bar to create a single national Court of Appeals for tax cases (or make Tax Court decisions appealable to a single existing Court of Appeals), to maintain uniformity in the application of the nation's tax laws (the very reason underlying the creation of the Tax Court and the grant of national jurisdiction to the Tax Court), but efforts to avoid "hometown results" or inconsistent results due to a lack of expertise have failed.

An important reason for the movements to create a single national Court of Appeals for tax cases is that the United States Tax Court does not have exclusive jurisdiction over tax cases. In addition to the Tax Court, federal tax matters can be heard and decided in three other courts: U.S. District Courts, the Court of Federal Claims, and the Bankruptcy Court. In the first two instances, the taxpayer bringing the claim generally must have first paid the deficiency determined by the IRS. For the Bankruptcy Court, the tax matter must arise as an issue in a bankruptcy proceeding. Bankruptcy Court appeals are initially to the U.S. District Court. Appeals beyond the U.S. District Courts and the Court of Federal Claims follow the same path as those from the U.S. Tax Court as described above.

With this number of courts involved in making legal determinations on federal tax matters, some observers express concern that the tax laws can be interpreted differently for like cases.

== Representation of parties ==
The Chief Counsel of the Internal Revenue Service or his delegate represents the executive branch in the Tax Court. The Tax Court permits persons who are not attorneys to be admitted to practice (to represent taxpayers) by applying for admission and passing an examination administered by the Court. Attorneys who provide evidence of membership and good standing in a state bar or the D.C. bar can be admitted to the bar of the Court without sitting for the Tax Court examination. Tax Court practice is highly specialized and most practitioners are licensed attorneys who specialize in tax controversies.

== Genesis of a Tax Court dispute ==
Many Tax Court cases involve disputes over federal income tax and penalties, often after an examination by the Internal Revenue Service of a taxpayer's return. After issuance of a series of preliminary written notices and a lack of agreement between the taxpayer and the IRS, the IRS formally "determines" the amount of the "deficiency" and issues a formal notice called a "statutory notice of deficiency," or "ninety day letter". In this context, the term "deficiency" is a legal term of art, and is not necessarily equal to the amount of unpaid tax (although it usually is). The deficiency is generally the excess of the amount the IRS contends is the correct tax over the amount the taxpayer showed on the return—in both cases, without regard to how much has actually been paid.

Upon issuance of the statutory notice of deficiency (after IRS determination of the tax amount, but before the formal IRS assessment of the tax), the taxpayer generally has 90 days to file a Tax Court petition for "redetermination of the deficiency". If no petition is timely filed, the IRS may then statutorily "assess" the tax. To "assess" the tax in this sense means to administratively and formally record the tax on the books of the United States Department of the Treasury. This formal statutory assessment is a critical act, as the statutory tax lien that later arises is effective retroactively to the date of the assessment, and encumbers all property and rights to property of the taxpayer.

== Life cycle of a Tax Court case ==
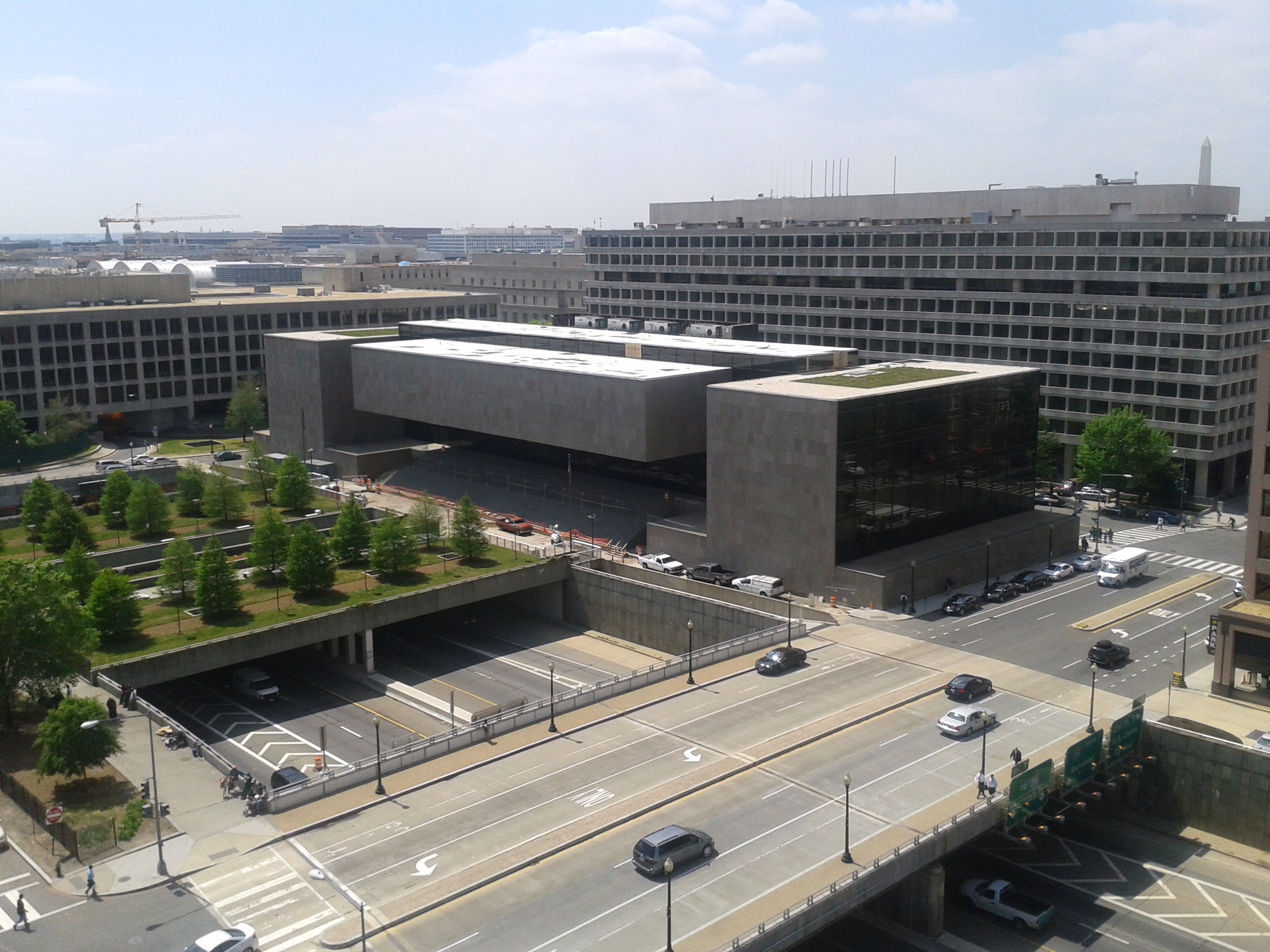
The United States Tax Court Building in Washington, D.C.

Because of the negative legal consequences ensuing with respect to a statutory assessment (especially the tax lien and the Flora requirement that the taxpayer otherwise pay the full disputed amount and sue for refund), a taxpayer is often well advised to file a Tax Court petition in a timely manner. The rule in the Tax Court is that the taxpayer sues the "Commissioner of Internal Revenue," with the taxpayer as "petitioner" and the Commissioner as "respondent". This rule is an example of an exception to the general rule that the proper party defendant in a tax case filed by a taxpayer against the federal government is "United States of America". In the Tax Court, the Commissioner is not named personally. The "Secretary of the Treasury", the "Department of the Treasury" and the "Internal Revenue Service" are not proper parties.

The petition must be timely filed within the allowable time. The Court cannot extend the time for filing, which is set by statute. A $60 filing fee must be paid when the petition is filed. Once the petition is filed, payment of the underlying tax ordinarily is postponed until the case has been decided. In certain tax disputes involving $50,000 or less, taxpayers may elect to have the case conducted under the Court's simplified small tax case procedure. Trials in small tax cases generally are less formal and result in a speedier disposition. However, decisions entered pursuant to small tax case procedures are not appealable and are not precedential.

Cases are calendared for trial as soon as practicable (on a first in/first out basis) after the case becomes at issue. When a case is calendared, the parties are notified by the Court of the date, time, and place of trial. Trials are conducted before one judge, without a jury, and taxpayers are permitted to represent themselves if they desire. However, the vast majority of cases are settled by mutual agreement without the necessity of a trial. However, if a trial is conducted, in due course a report is ordinarily issued by the presiding judge setting forth findings of fact and an opinion. The case is then closed in accordance with the judge's opinion by entry of a decision.

== Appellate review ==
Either the petitioner (the taxpayer) or the respondent (the Commissioner of Internal Revenue) may take an appeal from an adverse decision of the Tax Court to the appropriate United States Court of Appeals. In the case of an appeal by the taxpayer, a bond is normally required in order to avoid enforcement action during the pendency of the appeal. Instead of taking an appeal, the Internal Revenue Service may issue an "Action on Decision" indicating the Commissioner's "non-acquiescence" in the decision, meaning that the Commissioner will not follow the decision in subsequent cases. In such cases, the Commissioner hopes for the opportunity to litigate the matter in another circuit where he will have a better chance of obtaining reversal on appeal.

== Judges ==
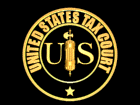
Seal of the United States Tax Court

The Tax Court is composed of 19 judges appointed by the President and confirmed by the Senate. Former judges whose terms have ended may become "senior judges", able to return and assist the court by hearing cases while serving on recall. In addition, the court is assisted by a number of "special trial judges", who are employees of the court, appointed by the chief judge of the Tax Court, rather than by the President. Special trial judges serve a function similar to that served by United States magistrate judges of the district courts, and may hear cases regarding alleged deficiencies or overpayments of up to $50,000. Reappointment, when requested by a Tax Court judge (I.R.C. 7447(b)(3)) is generally pro forma regardless of the political party of the appointing President and the political party of the re-appointing (sitting) President. Each active judge appointed by the President has two law clerks (attorney-advisers) and each senior judge and special trial judge has one law clerk.

President George W. Bush was heavily criticized by the U.S. Congress, the Tax Bar, and others when he indicated that he likely would not, or might not, re-appoint Tax Court judges whose terms were expiring (even though the first judge whose re-appointment President Bush called into question, Judge John O. Colvin, was appointed by President Ronald Reagan). President Bill Clinton also was criticized for not acting timely to re-appoint Tax Court judges, having allowed one sitting Chief Judge's term to expire, thus requiring the Tax Court to elect a new Chief Judge. Additionally, several Tax Court judges had to wait more than a year (sometimes more than two years) to be reappointed during the Clinton presidency.

Trial sessions are conducted and other work of the Court is performed by its judges, by senior judges serving on recall, and by special trial judges. All of the judges have expertise in the tax laws, and are tasked to "apply that expertise in a manner to ensure that taxpayers are assessed only what they owe, and no more". Although the "principal office" of the Court is located in the District of Columbia, Tax Court judges may sit "at any place within the United States". The judges travel nationwide to conduct trials in various designated cities. The work of the Tax Court has occasionally been interrupted by events: In 2001, a trial session in New York City was canceled due to the September 11 terrorist attacks. In 2005, stops in Miami and New Orleans were canceled due to the effects of hurricanes which had struck shortly before their scheduled visit to each city.

The Tax Court's judges serve 15-year terms, subject to presidential removal during the term for "[I]nefficiency, neglect of duty, or malfeasance in office". The mandatory retirement age for judges is 70. The judges' salaries are set at the same rate as "[J]udges of the district courts of the United States", currently $243,300 annually.

== Current composition of the court ==
As of March 29, 2025:

#	Title	Judge	Duty station	Born	Term of service			Appointed by
#	Title	Judge	Duty station	Born	Active	Chief	Senior	Appointed by
112	Chief Judge	Patrick J. Urda	Washington, D.C.	1976	2018–present	2025–present	—	Trump
106	Judge	Kathleen Kerrigan	Washington, D.C.	1964	2012–present	2022–2025	—	Obama
107	Judge	Ronald L. Buch	Washington, D.C.	1965	2013–present	—	—	Obama
109	Judge	Joseph W. Nega	Washington, D.C.	1960	2013–present	—	—	Obama
110	Judge	Cary Douglas Pugh	Washington, D.C.	1966	2014–present	—	—	Obama
111	Judge	Tamara W. Ashford	Washington, D.C.	1968	2014–present	—	—	Obama
113	Judge	Elizabeth A. Copeland	Washington, D.C.	1964	2018–present	—	—	Trump
114	Judge	Courtney D. Jones	Washington, D.C.	1978	2019–present	—	—	Trump
115	Judge	Emin Toro	Washington, D.C.	1974	2019–present	—	—	Trump
116	Judge	Travis A. Greaves	Washington, D.C.	1983	2020–present	—	—	Trump
117	Judge	Alina I. Marshall	Washington, D.C.	1977	2020–present	—	—	Trump
118	Judge	Christian N. Weiler	Washington, D.C.	1979	2020–present	—	—	Trump
119	Judge	Kashi Way	Washington, D.C.	—	2024–present	—	—	Biden
120	Judge	Adam B. Landy	Washington, D.C.	1982	2024–present	—	—	Biden
121	Judge	Jeffrey Arbeit	Washington, D.C.	—	2024–present	—	—	Biden
122	Judge	Benjamin A. Guider III	Washington, D.C.	—	2024–present	—	—	Biden
123	Judge	Rose E. Jenkins	Washington, D.C.	—	2024–present	—	—	Biden
124	Judge	Cathy Fung	Washington, D.C.	—	2024–present	—	—	Biden
125	Judge	vacant	Washington, D.C.	—	—	—	—	—
77	Senior Judge	Mary Ann Cohen	Washington, D.C.	1943	1982–1997; 1997–2012	1996–1997; 1997–2000	2012–present	Reagan; Clinton (reappointment)
89	Senior Judge	James Halpern	Washington, D.C.	1945	1990–2005; 2005–2015	—	2015–present	G.H.W. Bush; G.W. Bush (reappointment)
93	Senior Judge	Maurice B. Foley	Washington, D.C.	1960	1995–2010; 2011–2025	2018–2022	2025–present	Clinton; Obama (reappointment)
94	Senior Judge	Juan F. Vasquez	Washington, D.C.	1948	1995–2010; 2011–2018	—	2018–present	Clinton; Obama (reappointment)
96	Senior Judge	Michael B. Thornton	Washington, D.C.	1954	1998–2013; 2013–2021	2012–2013; 2013–2016	2021–present	Clinton; Obama (reappointment)
97	Senior Judge	L. Paige Marvel	Washington, D.C.	1949	1998–2013; 2014–2019	2016–2018	2019–present	Clinton; Obama (reappointment)
98	Senior Judge	Joseph Robert Goeke	Washington, D.C.	1950	2003–2018	—	2018–present	G.W. Bush
102	Senior Judge	Mark V. Holmes	Washington, D.C.	1960	2003–2018	—	2018–present	G.W. Bush
103	Senior Judge	David Gustafson	Washington, D.C.	1956	2008–2022	—	2022–present	G.W. Bush
104	Senior Judge	Elizabeth Crewson Paris	Washington, D.C.	1958	2008–2023	—	2023–present	G.W. Bush
105	Senior Judge	Richard T. Morrison	Washington, D.C.	1967	2008–2023	—	2023–present	G.W. Bush
108	Senior Judge	Albert G. Lauber	Washington, D.C.	1950	2013–2020	—	2020–present	Obama

=== Current special trial judges ===
As of January 1, 2026, the special trial judges on the court are as follows:

#	Title	Judge	Duty station	Born	Term of service			Appointed by
#	Title	Judge	Duty station	Born	Active	Chief	Senior	Appointed by
—	Chief Judge	Zachary S. Fried	Washington, D.C.	1981	2023–present	2025–present	—	—
—	Judge	Peter Panuthos	Washington, D.C.	1943	1983–present	1992–2017	—	—
—	Judge	Diana L. Leyden	Washington, D.C.	1956	2016–present	—	—	—
—	Judge	Jennifer E. Siegel	Washington, D.C.	1974	2023–present	—	—	—
—	Senior Judge	Lewis Carluzzo	Washington, D.C.	1949	1994–2026	2017–2025	2026–present	—

== Vacancies and pending nominations ==
Seat	Prior judge's duty station	Seat last held by	Vacancy reason	Date of vacancy	Nominee	Date of nomination
12	Washington, D.C.	Maurice B. Foley	Senior status	March 29, 2025	Andrew A. De Mello	July 13, 2026

== Former members of the Board of Tax Appeals and Tax Court ==
Former members were part of the Board of Tax Appeals until 1942, and part of the Tax Court since 1942.

#	Judge	State	Born–died	Active service	Chief Judge	Senior status	Appointed by	Reason for termination
1	Jules Gilmer Korner Jr.	NC	1888–1967	1924–1927	1925–1927	—	Coolidge; Coolidge (1926 reappointment)	resignation
2	W. C. Lansdon	KS	1863–1940	1924–1934	—	—	Coolidge; Coolidge (1926 reappointment)	expiration of term
3	Benjamin Horsley Littleton	TN	1889–1966	1924–1929	1927–1929	—	Coolidge; Coolidge (1926 reappointment)	elevation to the Court of Claims
4	John J. Marquette	MT	1879–1935	1924–1935	—	—	Coolidge; Coolidge (1926 reappointment)	death
5	Charles P. Smith	MA	1878–1948	1924–1946	—	—	Coolidge; Coolidge (1926 reappointment); F. Roosevelt (1934 reappointment)	expiration of term
6	John M. Sternhagen	IL	1888–1954	1924–1946	—	—	Coolidge; Coolidge (1926 reappointment); F. Roosevelt (1934 reappointment)	expiration of term
7	Charles M. Trammell	FL	1886–1967	1924–1936	—	—	Coolidge; Coolidge (1926 reappointment)	resignation
8	Sumner L. Trussell	MN	1860–1931	1924–1931	—	—	Coolidge; Coolidge (1926 reappointment)	death
9	Adolphus E. Graupner	CA	1875–1947	1924–1926	—	—	Coolidge	expiration of term
10	Charles D. Hamel	DC	1881–1970	1924–1925	1924–1925	—	Coolidge	resignation
11	James S.Y. Ivins	NY	1885–1960	1924–1925	—	—	Coolidge	resignation
12	Albert E. James	WI	1892–1952	1924–1926	—	—	Coolidge	expiration of term
13	Logan Morris	UT	1889–1977	1925–1937	1929–1933	—	Coolidge; Coolidge (1926 reappointment)	resignation
14	Percy W. Phillips	NY	1892–1969	1925–1931	—	—	Coolidge; Coolidge (1926 reappointment)	resignation
15	William R. Green Jr.	IA	1888–1966	1925–1929	—	—	Coolidge; Coolidge (1926 reappointment)	resignation
16	William D. Love	TX	1859–1933	1925–1933	—	—	Coolidge; Coolidge (1926 reappointment); Hoover (1932 reappointment)	death
17	C. Rogers Arundell	OR	1885–1968	1925–1955	1937–1941	1955–1968	Coolidge; Coolidge (1926 reappointment); F. Roosevelt (1938 reappointment); Truman (1950 reappointment)	death
18	John B. Milliken	AZ	1893–1981	1926–1929	—	—	Coolidge	resignation
19	J. Edgar Murdock	PA	1894–1977	1926–1961	1941–1945; 1955–1961	1962–1969	Coolidge; Hoover (1932 reappointment); F. Roosevelt (1944 reappointment); Eisenhower (1956 reappointment)	retirement
20	Ernest H. Van Fossan	OH	1888–1970	1926–1955	—	1955–1961	Coolidge; Hoover (1932 reappointment); F. Roosevelt (1944 reappointment)	retirement
21	Forest D. Siefkin	IL	1891–1964	1927–1929	—	—	Coolidge	resignation
22	Stephen J. McMahon	WI	1881–1960	1929–1936	—	—	Hoover	resignation
23	Eugene Black	TX	1879–1975	1929–1953	1933–1937	1953–1966	Hoover; Hoover (1932 reappointment); F. Roosevelt (1944 reappointment)	retirement
24	Herbert F. Seawell	NC	1869–1949	1929–1936	—	—	Hoover	expiration of term
25	Annabel Matthews	GA	1883–1960	1930–1936	—	—	Hoover	expiration of term
26	Edgar J. Goodrich	WV	1896–1969	1931–1935	—	—	Hoover	expiration of term
27	J. Russell Leech	PA	1888–1952	1932–1952	—	—	Hoover; F. Roosevelt (1934 reappointment); Truman (1946 reappointment)	death
28	Jed C. Adams	TX	1876–1935	1933–1935	—	—	F. Roosevelt	death
29	Bolon B. Turner	AR	1897–1987	1934–1962	1945–1949	1962–1971	F. Roosevelt; Truman (1946 reappointment); Eisenhower (1958 reappointment)	retirement
30	Arthur Johnson Mellott	KS	1888–1957	1935–1945	—	—	F. Roosevelt; F. Roosevelt (1936 reappointment)	elevation to D. Kan.
31	William W. Arnold	IL	1877–1957	1935–1950	—	—	F. Roosevelt; F. Roosevelt (1944 reappointment)	resignation
32	John A. Tyson	MS	1873–1971	1935–1950	—	—	F. Roosevelt; F. Roosevelt (1938 reappointment)	expiration of term
33	Richard L. Disney	OK	1887–1976	1936–1951	—	—	F. Roosevelt; Truman (1948 reappointment)	resignation
34	Samuel B. Hill	WA	1875–1958	1936–1953	—	—	F. Roosevelt; Truman (1948 reappointment)	resignation
35	Marion Janet Harron	CA	1903–1972	1936–1960	—	1960–1961; 1962–1970	F. Roosevelt; Truman (1948 reappointment)	retirement
36	Justin Miller	NC	1888–1973	1936–1937	—	—	F. Roosevelt	elevation to D.C. Cir.
37	John W. Kern Jr.	IN	1900–1971	1937–1961	1949–1955	1961–1971	F. Roosevelt; F. Roosevelt (1938 reappointment); Truman (1950 reappointment)	death
38	Clarence V. Opper	NY	1897–1964	1938–1964	—	—	F. Roosevelt; F. Roosevelt (1938 reappointment); Truman (1950 reappointment); Kennedy (1962 reappointment)	death
39	Byron B. Harlan	OH	1886–1949	1946–1949	—	—	Truman; Truman (1948 reappointment)	death
40	Clarence P. LeMire	MO	1886–1961	1946–1956	—	1956–1959	Truman	retirement
41	Luther Alexander Johnson	TX	1875–1965	1946–1956	—	—	Truman	resignation
42	Norman O. Tietjens	OH	1903–1983	1950–1971	1961–1967	1971–1983	Truman; Kennedy (1962 reappointment)	death
43	Arnold Raum	MA	1908–1999	1950–1978	—	1978–1998	Truman; Eisenhower (1960 reappointment); Nixon (1972 reappointment)	retirement
44	Stephen E. Rice	FL	1905–1958	1950–1958	—	—	Truman; Eisenhower (1956 reappointment)	death
45	J. Gregory Bruce	KY	1897–1985	1952–1967	—	1967–1981	Truman; Eisenhower (1958 reappointment)	retirement
46	Graydon G. Withey	MI	1910–1994	1952–1972	—	1972–1974	Truman; Eisenhower (1960 reappointment)	retirement
47	Morton P. Fisher	MD	1897–1965	1954–1965	—	—	Eisenhower; Eisenhower (1956 reappointment)	death
48	Arnold R. Baar	IL	1891–1954	1954–1954	—	—	Eisenhower	death
49	Allin H. Pierce	IL	1897–1980	1955–1967	—	1967–1968	Eisenhower; Eisenhower (1960 reappointment)	retirement
50	Craig S. Atkins	MD	1903–1990	1955–1972	—	1972–1972	Eisenhower; Kennedy (1962 reappointment)	retirement
51	John E. Mulroney	IA	1896–1979	1955–1966	—	1966–1970	Eisenhower; Eisenhower (1956 reappointment)	retirement
52	Bruce Forrester	MO	1908–1995	1957–1976	—	1976–1984	Eisenhower; Eisenhower (1958 reappointment); Nixon (1970 reappointment)	retirement
53	Russell E. Train	DC	1920–2012	1957–1965	—	—	Eisenhower; Eisenhower (1958 reappointment)	resignation
54	William Miller Drennen	WV	1914–2000	1958–1980	1967–1973	1980–1993	Eisenhower; L. Johnson (1968 reappointment)	retirement
55	Irene F. Scott	AL	1912–1997	1960–1982	—	1982–1997	Eisenhower; Nixon (1972 reappointment)	death
56	William M. Fay	PA	1915–2000	1961–1985	—	1985–2000	Kennedy; L. Johnson (1968 reappointment); Carter (1980 reappointment)	death
57	Howard Dawson	MD	1922–2016	1962–1985	1973–1977; 1983–1985	1985–1986; 1990–2016	Kennedy; Nixon (1970 reappointment)	death
58	Austin Hoyt	CO	1915–1976	1962–1973	—	1973–1976	Kennedy	death
59	Theodore Tannenwald Jr.	NY	1916–1999	1965–1983	1981–1983	1983–1999	L. Johnson; Nixon (1974 reappointment)	death
60	Charles R. Simpson	IL	1921–2015	1965–1987	—	1987–1988	L. Johnson; L. Johnson (1968 reappointment); Carter (1980 reappointment)	retirement
61	C. Moxley Featherston	VA	1914–1998	1967–1983	1977–1981	1983–1991	L. Johnson; L. Johnson (1968 reappointment); Carter (1980 reappointment)	retirement
62	Leo H. Irwin	NC	1917–1995	1968–1983	—	1983–1984	L. Johnson; Nixon (1970 reappointment)	retirement
63	Samuel B. Sterrett	MD	1922–2013	1968–1988	1985–1988	—	L. Johnson; Reagan (1985 reappointment)	resignation
64	William H. Quealy	VA	1913–1993	1969–1980	—	—	Nixon; Nixon (1972 reappointment)	resignation
65	William A. Goff	OK	1929–2019	1971–1986	—	1986–1992	Nixon	retirement
66	Cynthia Holcomb Hall	CA	1929–2011	1972–1981	—	—	Nixon	elevation to 9th Cir.
67	Darrell D. Wiles	MO	1914–2001	1972–1984	—	1984–1987	Nixon	retirement
68	Richard C. Wilbur	MD	1936–2020	1974–1986	—	1986–1987	Nixon	retirement
69	Herbert Chabot	MD	1931–2022	1978–2001	—	2001–2015	Carter; Clinton (1993 reappointment)	retirement
70	Arthur Nims	NJ	1923–2019	1979–1992	1988–1992	1992–2011	Carter	retirement
71	Edna G. Parker	VA	1930–1996	1980–1995	—	1995–1996	Carter	death
72	Sheldon V. Ekman	CT	1920–1982	1980–1982	—	—	Carter	death
73	Meade Whitaker	MI	1919–2005	1982–1989	—	1989–1995	Reagan	retirement
74	Jules G. Körner III	MD	1922–2000	1982–1992	—	1992–1997	Reagan	retirement
75	Perry Shields	TN	1925–2002	1982–1994	—	1994–1994	Reagan	retirement
76	Lapsley W. Hamblen Jr.	VA	1926–2012	1982–1996	1992–1996	1996–2000	Reagan	retirement
78	Charles Clapp	RI	1923–2004	1983–1993	—	1993–1998	Reagan	retirement
79	Stephen Swift	CA/VA	1943–present	1983–2008	—	2008–2009	Reagan; Clinton (2000 reappointment)	retirement
80	Julian Jacobs	MD	1937–2025	1984–1999	—	1999–2019	Reagan	retirement
81	Joel Gerber	VA	1940–2022	1984–2006	2004–2006	2006–2020	Reagan; Clinton (2000 reappointment)	retirement
82	Lawrence A. Wright	VT	1927–2000	1984–1996	—	1996–2000	Reagan	death
83	Carolyn Miller Parr	MD	1937–present	1985–2001	—	2001–2002	Reagan	retirement
84	B. John Williams	VA	1949–present	1985–1990	—	—	Reagan	resignation
85	Thomas B. Wells	GA/MD	1945–present	1986–2011	1997; 2000–2004	2011–2022	Reagan; G.W. Bush (2001 reappointment)	retirement
86	Robert Ruwe	VA	1941–2022	1987–2002	—	2002–2020	Reagan	retirement
87	Laurence Whalen	OK	1944–present	1987–2002	—	2002–2018	Reagan	retirement
88	John O. Colvin	OH	1946–2024	1988–2003; 2004–2016	2006–2012; 2013	2016–2024	Reagan; G.W. Bush (2004 reappointment)	death
90	Renato Beghe	NY	1933–2012	1991–2003	—	2003–2012	G.H.W. Bush	death
91	Carolyn Chiechi	MD	1943–present	1992–2007	—	2007–2018	G.H.W. Bush	retirement
92	David Laro	MI	1942–2018	1992–2007	—	2007–2018	G.H.W. Bush	death
95	Joseph H. Gale	VA	1953–present	1996–2011; 2011–2023	—	2023–2024	Clinton; Obama (2011 reappointment)	retirement
99	Harry Haines	MT	1939–present	2003–2009	—	2009–2016	G.W. Bush	retirement
100	Robert Wherry	CO	1944–present	2003–2014	—	2014–2018	G.W. Bush	retirement
101	Diane Kroupa	MN	1955–present	2003–2014	—	—	G.W. Bush	resignation

== Succession of seats ==
The court has 19 seats for active judges, numbered in the order in which they were initially filled. Judges who assume senior status enter a kind of retirement in which they remain on the bench but vacate their seats, thus allowing the U.S. President to appoint new judges to fill their seats.

Seat 1
Established on June 2, 1924 by the Revenue Act of 1924 as a member of the Board of Tax Appeals
Korner Jr.	NC	1924–1927
Siefkin	IL	1927–1929
McMahon	WI	1929–1936
Miller	NC	1936–1937
Kern	IN	1937–1961
Hoyt	CO	1962–1973
Wilbur	MD	1974–1986
Wells	GA/MD	1986–2011
Nega	IL	2013–present

Seat 2
Established on June 2, 1924 by the Revenue Act of 1924 as a member of the Board of Tax Appeals
Lansdon	KS	1924–1934
Turner	AR	1934–1962
Dawson	MD	1962–1985
Williams	VA	1985–1990
Beghe	NY	1991–2003
Haines	MT	2003–2009
Kerrigan	MA	2012–present

Seat 3
Established on June 2, 1924 by the Revenue Act of 1924 as a member of the Board of Tax Appeals
Littleton	TN	1924–1929
Seawell	NC	1929–1936
Disney	OK	1936–1951
Withey	MI	1952–1972
Wiles	MO	1972–1984
Wright	VT	1984–1996
Marvel	MD	1998–2019
Marshall	VA	2020–present

Seat 4
Established on June 2, 1924 by the Revenue Act of 1924 as a member of the Board of Tax Appeals
Marquette	MT	1924–1935
Tyson	MS	1935–1950
Tietjens	OH	1950–1971
Goff	OK	1971–1986
Whalen	OK	1987–2002
Wherry	CO	2003–2014
Pugh	VA	2014–present

Seat 5
Established on June 2, 1924 by the Revenue Act of 1924 as a member of the Board of Tax Appeals
Smith	MA	1924–1946
LeMire	MO	1946–1956
Train	DC	1957–1965
Irwin	NC	1968–1983
Swift	CA/VA	1983–2008
Lauber	DC	2013–2020
Weiler	LA	2020–present

Seat 6
Established on June 2, 1924 by the Revenue Act of 1924 as a member of the Board of Tax Appeals
Sternhagen	IL	1924–1946
Johnson	TX	1946–1956
Forrester	MO	1957–1976
Chabot	MD	1978–2001
Goeke	IL	2003–2018
Toro	VA	2019–present

Seat 7
Established on June 2, 1924 by the Revenue Act of 1924 as a member of the Board of Tax Appeals
Trammell	FL	1924–1936
Hill	WA	1936–1953
Baar	IL	1954
Pierce	IL	1955–1967
Quealy	VA	1969–1980
Parker	VA	1980–1995
Gale	VA	1996–2023
Fung	CA	2024–present

Seat 8
Established on June 2, 1924 by the Revenue Act of 1924 as a member of the Board of Tax Appeals
Trussell	MN	1924–1931
Leech	PA	1932–1952
Bruce	KY	1952–1967
Sterrett	MD	1968–1988
Colvin	VA	1988–2016
Jones	LA	2019–present

Seat 9
Established on June 2, 1924 by the Revenue Act of 1924 as a member of the Board of Tax Appeals
Hamel	DC	1924–1925
Arundell	OR	1925–1955
Atkins	MD	1955–1972
Hall	CA	1972–1981
Cohen	CA	1982–2012
Ashford	VA	2014–present

Seat 10
Established on June 2, 1924 by the Revenue Act of 1924 as a member of the Board of Tax Appeals
Morris	UT	1925–1937
Opper	NY	1938–1964
Tannenwald	NY	1965–1983
Jacobs	MD	1984–1999
Holmes	NY	2003–2018
Way	MD	2024–present

Seat 11
Established on June 2, 1924 by the Revenue Act of 1924 as a member of the Board of Tax Appeals
Phillips	NY	1925–1931
Goodrich	DC	1931–1935
Mellott	KS	1935–1945
Harlan	OH	1946–1949
Raum	MA	1950–1978
Nims	NJ	1979–1992
Chiechi	MD	1992–2007
Gustafson	VA	2008–2022
Landy	SC	2024–present

Seat 12
Established on June 2, 1924 by the Revenue Act of 1924 as a member of the Board of Tax Appeals
Green	IA	1925–1929
Matthews	GA	1930–1936
Harron	CA	1936–1960
Scott	AL	1960–1982
Clapp	RI	1983–1993
Foley	CA/MD	1995–2025
vacant	–	2025–present

Seat 13
Established on June 2, 1924 by the Revenue Act of 1924 as a member of the Board of Tax Appeals
Love	TX	1925–1933
Adams	TX	1933–1935
Arnold	IL	1935–1950
Rice	FL	1950–1958
Drennen	WV	1958–1980
Ekman	CT	1980–1982
Hamblen	VA	1982–1996
Thornton	VA	1998–2021
Arbeit	DC	2024–present

Seat 14
Established on June 2, 1924 by the Revenue Act of 1924 as a member of the Board of Tax Appeals
Milliken (Note: Milliken, Murdock and Van Fossan succeeded original board members Graupner, Ivins and James, but as they were appointed as a group, it is unclear who succeeded whom.)	AZ	1926–1929
Black	TX	1929–1953
Fisher	MD	1954–1965
Simpson	IL	1965–1987
Ruwe	VA	1987–2002
Kroupa	MN	2003–2014
Urda	IN	2018–present

Seat 15
Established on June 2, 1924 by the Revenue Act of 1924 as a member of the Board of Tax Appeals
Murdock	PA	1926–1961
Fay	PA	1961–1985
Parr	MD	1985–2001
Morrison	VA	2008–2023
Guider III	LA	2024–present

Seat 16
Established on June 2, 1924 by the Revenue Act of 1924 as a member of the Board of Tax Appeals
Van Fossan	OH	1926–1955
Mulroney	IA	1955–1966
Featherston	VA	1967–1983
Gerber	VA	1984–2006
Paris	DC	2008–2023
Jenkins	DC	2024–present

Seat 17
Established on October 13, 1980 by 96 Stat. 439
Whitaker	MI	1982–1989
Halpern	DC	1990–2015
Copeland	TX	2018–present

Seat 18
Established on October 13, 1980 by 96 Stat. 439
Körner III	MD	1982–1992
Laro	MI	1992–2007
Buch	VA	2013–present

Seat 19
Established on October 13, 1980 by 96 Stat. 439
Shields	TN	1982–1994
Vasquez	TX	1995–2018
Greaves	DC	2020–present

== Past special trial judges ==
- James M. Gussis (1970–1994)
- Joseph N. Ingolia (1970–1977)
- Charles R. Johnston (1970–1980)
- John H. Sacks (1970–1977)
- Randolph F. Caldwell Jr. (1971–1985)
- Lehman C. Aarons (1975–1986)
- Murray H. Falk (1975–1981)
- Francis J. Cantrel (1977–1994)
- Fred S. Gilbert Jr. (1977–1984)
- Edna G. Parker (1977–1980; elevated to a regular seat on the Tax Court)
- John Pajak (1979–2005)
- Marvin F. Peterson (1979–1994; Chief Special Trial Judge, 1987–1994)
- Darrell D. Hallett (1980–1983)
- Fred R. Tansill (1980–1986)
- Lee M. Galloway (1981–1993)
- Helen A. Buckley (1983–1994)
- Joan Seitz Pate (1983–1994)
- Hu S. Vandervort (1984–1989)
- D. Irvin Couvillion (1985–2008)
- Stanley Goldberg (1985–2010)
- Carleton Powell (1985–2007)
- Norman H. Wolfe (1985–2005)
- Larry L. Nameroff (1986–2000)
- Daniel J. Dinan (1991–2003)
- Robert Armen (1993–2019)
- John F. Dean (1994–2014)
- Daniel A. Guy Jr. (2012–2022)
- Eunkyong Choi (2021–2023)
