= C. Rogers Arundell =

American judge (1885–1968)

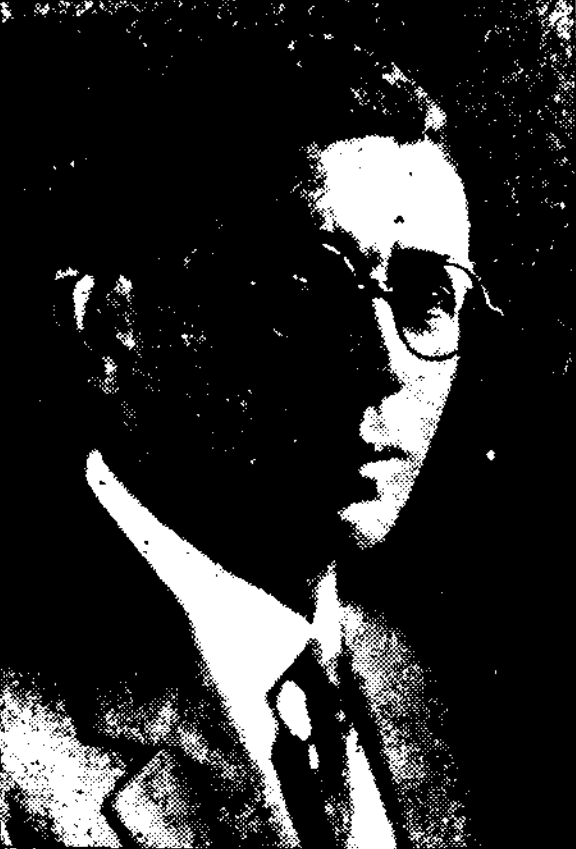
- Arundell in 1926

Judge of the United States Tax Court
- In office September 1, 1925 – May 28, 1968

Personal details
- Born: Charles Rogers Arundell; June 7, 1885 Washington, D.C., U.S.
- Died: May 28, 1968 (aged 82)
- Spouse: Alice W. Wright (m. 1926)
- Children: 1
- Education: George Washington University (LLB)
- Profession: Judge

Charles Rogers Arundell (June 7, 1885 – May 28, 1968) was a judge of the United States Tax Court from 1925 to 1968.

Born in Washington, D.C., Arundell attended public school in the District and received an LL.B. from George Washington University in 1908.

He practiced law in Portland, Oregon, from 1910 to 1915, and served as chief of the Alaskan Field Division in the United States General Land Office, in charge of public lands of Alaska, from 1916 to 1919. He was a special attorney and assistant solicitor in the Bureau of Internal Revenue of the Treasury Department from 1921 to 1925. He was appointed to the U.S. Board of Tax Appeals (now the Tax Court) on September 1, 1925, and reappointed for three succeeding terms on June 2, 1926, June 2, 1938, and June 2, 1950, respectively. He served as chairman of the U.S. Board of Tax Appeals from 1937 to 1941, and retired August 31, 1955, though he was immediately thereafter recalled to perform further judicial duties.

Arundell married Alice W. Robinson, née Wright, September 21, 1926, with whom he had one daughter, Elizabeth.
