= William H. Quealy =

American judge (1913–1993)

Justice of the United States Tax Court
- In office October 1, 1969 – 1980

Personal details
- Born: William Harrison Quealy; March 11, 1913 New Orleans, Louisiana, U.S.
- Died: September 29, 1993 (aged 80) Amelia Island, Florida, U.S.
- Cause of death: Cardiac arrest
- Spouse: Betty Alice Shallberg (m. 1940)
- Children: 4
- Parent(s): William I. Quealy; Elizabeth H. Quealy
- Education: Georgetown Preparatory School; Colegio De La Salle; Georgetown University College of Arts & Sciences (AB); Georgetown University Law Center (LLB)
- Profession: Lawyer, judge

Military service
- Allegiance: United States
- Branch/service: United States Army
- Years of service: 1942–1945
- Rank: Captain
- Unit: 57th Infantry Regiment
- Battles/wars: World War II

William Harrison Quealy (March 11, 1913 – September 29, 1993) was a judge of the United States Tax Court from 1969 to 1980.

== Early life and education ==
Born in New Orleans, Louisiana to William I. and Elizabeth H. Quealy of that city, Quealy's father was a banker whose business brought the family to Havana, Cuba, where Quealy attended the Colegio De La Salle.

Quealy also attended Springhill High School in Mobile, Alabama, and Georgetown Preparatory School in Garrett Park, Maryland.

He received an A.B. from the Georgetown University College of Arts & Sciences, cum laude, in 1933 and an LL.B. from the Georgetown University Law Center in 1937.

== Legal career and military service ==
Quealy gained admission to the bar in 1936. From 1942 to 1945, he served in the United States military, first as company officer with the United States Army 57th Infantry Regiment in the Asiatic-Pacific theater of World War II, Towards the end of the war, he served as a negotiator on the Detroit Renegotiation Board for United States Air Force Material Command. He left the service with the rank of captain.

Outside of this service, he was a practicing tax attorney in Washington, D.C., and Chicago, Illinois, from 1936 to 1962. He then served as minority counsel for the United States House Committee on Ways and Means from 1962 to 1969.

Quealy was appointed to the United States Tax Court by President Richard Nixon in 1969, taking his oath of office as judge on that court on October 1, 1969, for a term expiring June 1, 1987. He served until 1980, when he retired, thereafter moving to Florida.

== Personal life and death ==
In 1940, Quealy married Betty Alice Shallberg of Moline, Illinois, with whom he had three daughters and one son.

Quealy died of cardiac arrest at his home in Amelia Island, Florida, at the age of 80.
