= Emin Toro =

American judge (born 1974)

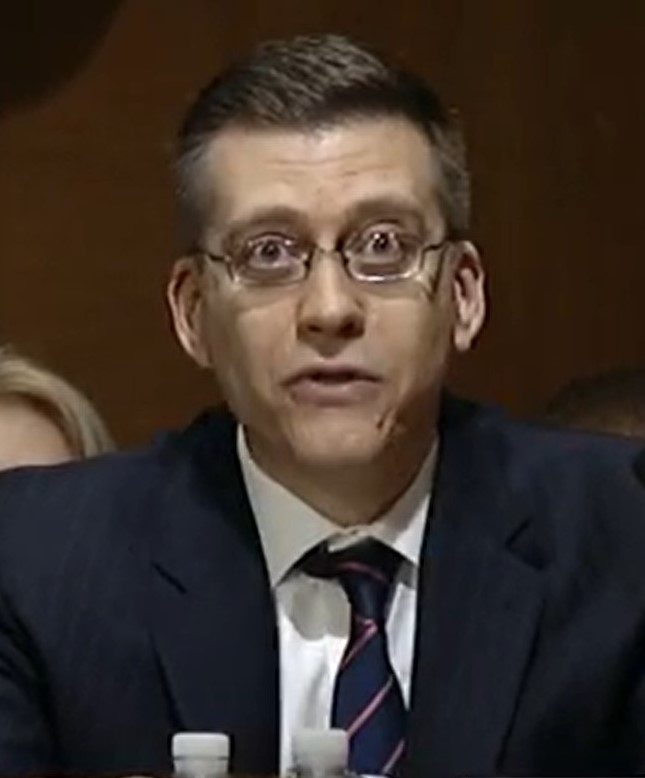
- Toro in 2019

Judge of the United States Tax Court
- Incumbent
- Assumed office October 18, 2019
- Appointed by: Donald Trump
- Preceded by: Joe Goeke

Personal details
- Born: 1974 (age 51–52) Tirana, Albania
- Education: Palm Beach Atlantic University (BA); University of North Carolina, Chapel Hill (JD)

Emin Toro (born 1974) is an American lawyer who serves as a judge of the United States Tax Court.

== Early life and education ==
Toro was born in Tirana, Albania, in 1974, the son of Lavdie and Sali Toro. His father was a director for a furniture manufacturing company and his mother was the artistic director for a puppet theater. While in his teens, he met Dan Burrell, a Royal Palm Beach minister who went to Albania for Christian mission work in an orphanage. Toro was chosen to be the interpreter. After the mission was over, Burrell invited Toro to accompany him to the United States and attend college there.

Toro received a Bachelor of Arts from Palm Beach Atlantic University and a Juris Doctor from the University of North Carolina School of Law, where he was inducted into Order of the Coif and was articles editor for the North Carolina Law Review.

== Career ==
After law school, Toro clerked for Judge Karen L. Henderson of the United States Court of Appeals for the District of Columbia Circuit and Associate Justice Clarence Thomas of the Supreme Court of the United States. Toro is a Fellow of the American College of Tax Counsel. He has been a partner at Covington & Burling from 2008 to 2019.

On April 10, 2018, President Donald Trump nominated Toro to serve as a Judge of the United States Tax Court. He was nominated to the seat vacated by Judge Joseph Robert Goeke, whose term expired on April 21, 2018. On January 3, 2019, his nomination was returned to the President under Rule XXXI, Paragraph 6 of the United States Senate.

On February 6, 2019, his re-nomination was sent to the Senate. On May 23, 2019, the Senate Finance Committee reported his nomination out of committee by a 28–0 vote. On August 1, 2019, his nomination was confirmed by the Senate by voice vote. He was sworn in on October 18, 2019, for a term ending October 17, 2034.

== See also ==
- List of law clerks for the tenth seat of the Supreme Court of the United States

Legal offices
Preceded by Joseph Robert Goeke	Judge of the United States Tax Court; 2019–present	Incumbent
