= C. Moxley Featherston =

American judge (1914–1998)

Couch Moxley Featherston (June 6, 1914 – April 10, 1998) was a judge of the United States Tax Court from 1967 to 1983.

== Early life, education, and career ==
Born in Jayton, Texas, Featherston attended the public schools in Petersburg, Texas, receiving a B.A. from Hardin–Simmons University in 1935 (magna cum laude), followed by a J.D. from the George Washington University Law School in 1939, where he was a member of the law review. Featherson gained admission to the bar in the District of Columbia Bar in 1939 and in Texas the following year. After briefly practicing law in Hereford, Texas in 1940, Featherston was an attorney in the United States Department of Agriculture from 1940 to 1942, and with the War Relocation Authority during World War II, from 1942 to 1945. He worked in the United States Department of Justice, Tax Division from 1945 to 1949, and was assistant general counsel for the Office of the Coordinator of Inter-American Affairs from 1949 to 1951, returning to the DOJ from 1951 to 1967.

== Judicial service ==
In 1967, President Lyndon B. Johnson appointed Featherston as judge of the United States Tax Court. He took his oath of office on July 24, 1967, for a term expiring on June 1, 1980. He was reappointed by President Jimmy Carter on June 1, 1980, to a term expiring on June 1, 1995, but retired on December 24, 1983. Featherston "authored almost 1,000 opinions during his tenure". Among them was a 1983 case outlining the steps that the owner of a home computer would need to take to claim the device as a business expense.

== Personal life and death ==
Featherston married Rose Darlington Ross in 1938, with whom he had two sons and a daughter.

He moved to El Paso in 1989, and died there nine years later, at the age of 83.
