= Darrell D. Wiles =

American judge (1914–)

Darrell D. Wiles (1914 – January 3, 2001) was a judge of the United States Tax Court from 1972 to 1984.

== Early life and education ==
Born in Fraser, Iowa, Wiles attended public schools in Fort Dodge, Iowa, graduating in 1933, and thereafter receiving a B.A. from the State University of Iowa in 1938 and J.D. from the same institution in 1940.

== Career ==
In 1940, Wiles was admitted to the Iowa bar and later to the Missouri bar in 1948. From 1944 to 1948, he worked as a tax attorney with the Office of the Chief Counsel for the Internal Revenue Service in Washington, D.C. In 1948, Wiles joined the St. Louis law firm of Lewis, Rice, Tucker, Allen, and Chubb, becoming a partner in 1953. He later co-founded the law firm Wiles and Giljum in 1969.

During his career, Wiles worked in several legal organizations, including the American Judicature Society and the American Bar Association's Section of Taxation, where he held the positions of secretary from 1960 to 1962 and council member from 1967 to 1970. He also held leadership roles in the Missouri Bar Association and the Bar Association of Metropolitan St. Louis.

In 1972, Wiles was appointed to the U.S. Tax Court, succeeding the retiring Judge Graydon G. Withey. His term was set to expire in 1987. Wiles contributed to the field of tax law through his participation in various legal committees and conferences, including serving as chair of multiple taxation committees and the Mid-American Tax Conference in 1967.

== Personal life ==
Wiles married Helen Frick, with whom he had two daughters.
