= Edgar J. Goodrich =

American judge (1896–1969)

Edgar Jennings Goodrich (November 15, 1896 – April 10, 1969) was a judge of the United States Board of Tax Appeals (later the United States Tax Court) from March 24, 1931 to February 15, 1935.

== Early life, military service, and education ==
Born in Anoka, Minnesota, Goodrich joined the 3rd Minnesota Infantry Regiment and served on the Mexican border in 1916. He was assigned to the 1st Officers Training Camp at Fort Snelling in Minnesota in 1917, and then deployed to Europe during World War I.

In the war, he served with the 34th Infantry Division, and the 59th Air Defense Artillery Regiment, and as an observer with the 1st Reconnaissance Squadron. Following the war, he served as an observer with the British Army of the Rhine in their occupation of Germany, Achieving the rank of command First Lieutenant. He attended the course for American soldiers at Nancy-Université in France in 1919.

Returning to the United States, he received an LL.B. from the University of Iowa College of Law.

== Career ==
Goodrich was an assistant county attorney for Anoka County, Minnesota from 1922 to 1923, and then moved to Charleston, West Virginia, where he established a law practice with a specialty in taxation. On March 19, 1931, Goodrich was appointed to the Board of Tax Appeals by President Herbert Hoover, having been endorsed for the appointment by West Virginia's senators, Guy D. Goff and Henry D. Hatfield. Goodrich announced his resignation from the court on February 1, 1935.

After leaving the court in 1935, he returned to private practice as a partner of the firm Guggenheimer, Untermyer and Goodrich, and "authored several articles on taxation and was lecturer of the Practicing Law Institute".

In 1951, the Section of Taxation of the American Bar Association formed a Committee on Retirement Benefits for Tax Court Judges which was chaired by Goodrich.

== Personal life and death ==
Goodrich died at the Washington Hospital Center in Washington, D.C., after a brief illness, at the age of 72.
