= Jules G. Körner III =

American judge (1922–2000)

Jules Gilmer Körner III (July 27, 1922 – February 20, 2000) was a judge of the United States Tax Court from 1981 to 1997.

== Early life, education, and military service ==
Born in Washington, D.C., Körner was the son of Jules Gilmer Korner Jr., who served on the United States Board of Tax Appeals. Körner graduated from St. Albans School in 1939 and received an A.B. from the University of Virginia (intermediate honors and Dean's List) in 1943, also studying at the University of Mexico in the summer of 1941. Körner was commissioned as an ensign in the U.S. Naval Reserve during World War II, in 1943. He served on active duty with U.S. Navy amphibious forces as commanding officer of an amphibious landing ship from 1943 to 1946, in various places, including Pacific theatre and Japan. Remaining in the Naval Reserve after the war, he received an LL.B. form the University of Virginia School of Law in 1947.

He was an attorney in the area of Federal Tax law in the Washington, DC, law firm of his father, Blair, Korner, Doyle & Worth (later Korner, Doyle, Worth & Crampton) 1947 to 1970. From 1955 to 1956, he was also the commanding officer of Naval Reserve Material Company W-2, under the Office of Naval Materiel. Körner resigned his naval commission in 1960, and served as the tax member of a private mission employed by the Government of Ecuador in 1961, assisting the internal revenue service of that country in overhauling its tax system. He was adjunct professor of law at the Georgetown University Law Center from 1963 to 1968.

He was a senior tax partner in the firm of Pope Ballard & Loos from 1970 to 1981. On November 16, 1981, Körner was nominated by President Ronald Reagan to a 15-year term in one of the three new seats on the U.S. Tax Court, and took oath of office on January 22, 1982. Körner served on the Tax court until he assumed senior status on July 28, 1992. He continued to serve as a senior judge until his retirement on October 3, 1997.

== Personal life and death ==
On September 19, 1943, Körner married Dora Jean McKee in Washington, D.C., with whom he had one son and one daughter.

Körner died in suburban Maryland, at the age of 77.
