= Charles Clapp (judge) =

American judge (1923–2004)

Charles E. Clapp, II (December 25, 1923 – June 16, 2004) was a judge of the United States Tax Court.

Born in Newton, Massachusetts, Clapp attended public schools in Dedham, Massachusetts, and Deerfield Academy, Deerfield, Massachusetts. He received a B.A. from Williams College in 1945, and an LL.B. from Harvard Law School in 1949. He was admitted to the Massachusetts Bar in 1949, the Rhode Island Bar in 1956, and the Florida Bar in 1982. Clapp served as an officer in the United States Navy in the Pacific Theater during World War II. He then practiced law in Boston with the firm of Richardson, Wolcott, Tyler, and Fassett until he was recalled to active service in the Navy in 1950, serving in the Korean War until 1952, and retiring with the rank of Lieutenant in 1953.

From 1952 to 1955 Clapp was an attorney-adviser to Tax Court Judge J. Edgar Murdock in Washington, D.C. In 1955, he joined the law firm of Edwards and Angell in Providence, Rhode Island, became a member of the firm in 1959, and later was Senior Tax Partner. President Ronald Reagan appointed Clapp to the Tax Court in 1983. Clapp formally retired on December 26, 1993, but continued to serve in senior status until March 31, 1998. He died peacefully at his home in Duxbury, Massachusetts, after a long illness.

Clapp was a member of the American, Rhode Island, and Florida Bar Associations, and of the executive committee of the Federal Tax Institute of New England. He was co-founder of the Federal Tax Forum of Rhode Island; and a member of the Advisory Committee, University of Rhode Island Institute on Federal Taxation. His civic activities included the United Way Board and campaign; past President of Narragansett Council, Boy Scouts of America; and past President of Barrington, Rhode Island, Town Council. He married Elinor Jones in 1951, with whom he had seven children.

== Sources ==
- Press Release on the death of Senior Judge Charles E. Clapp, II, United States Tax Court, June 23, 2004 (a document in the public domain).
