= Justice Hoyt =

Justice Hoyt may refer to:

- William Lloyd Hoyt (born 1930), chief justice of New Brunswick
- John Philo Hoyt (1841–1926), associate justice of the Washington Supreme Court

== See also ==
- Judge Hoyt (disambiguation)
