= William Miller Drennen =

American judge (1914–2000)

Chief Judge of the United States Tax Court
- In office 1967–1973

Judge of the United States Tax Court
- In office 1958–1993
- Appointed by: Dwight D. Eisenhower

Personal details
- Born: March 1, 1914 Jenkins, Kentucky, U.S.
- Died: December 22, 2000 (aged 86)
- Education: Ohio State, B.A. Ohio State, J.D.

William Miller Drennen (March 1, 1914 in Jenkins, Kentucky – December 22, 2000) was a Judge of the United States Tax Court who served from 1958 to 1992.

Drennen earned a bachelor's degree in 1936 and a Juris Doctor degree in 1938 from Ohio State University Moritz College of Law. During law school, he was employed in the office of the Ohio State Tax Commissioner. After graduation, he clerked for the Hon. George Warwick McClintic of the United States District Court for the Southern District of West Virginia, before joining the law firm of Brown, Jackson & Knight (now Jackson Kelly) in Charleston, West Virginia. From 1942 to 1945, he was a Naval air combat intelligence officer in the Pacific, becoming a lieutenant commander.

After the war, Drennen returned to Charleston, where he became a partner at Jackson & Kelly and served as a member of the city council, the board of trustees of Charleston Memorial Hospital, the board of directors of the Charleston Chamber of Commerce, the board of directors of the Buckskin Council of the Boy Scouts of America, the American Judicature Society, the American Bar Association section of taxation, and the Englewood Country Club. He was president of the West Virginia Tax Institute.

Drennen was appointed to the Tax Court by President Dwight D. Eisenhower, taking the oath of office on October 1, 1958. He was elected Chief Judge for three consecutive 2-year terms, serving from 1967 to 1972. During his tenure as Chief Judge, the Court became a legislative court under Article I of the United States Constitution, and the Court's jurisdiction was significantly expanded. As Chief Judge, he successfully pursued the construction of a new courthouse for the Tax Court. He assumed senior status on June 2, 1980, and retired on December 31, 1993.
