= Irene F. Scott =

American Tax Court judge (1912–1997)

Irene Feagin Scott (October 6, 1912 – April 10, 1997) was a judge of the United States Tax Court from 1960 to 1982.

== Early life, education, and career ==
Born in Union Springs, Alabama, to Arthur H. and Irene Peach Feagin, she attended public school in Union Springs, graduating from Union Springs High School in 1929. She received an A.B. from the University of Alabama in 1932, followed by an LL.B. from the same school in 1936. She was admitted to Alabama bar in 1936, and became an attorney in the Office of Chief Counsel, Internal Revenue Service in 1937. She also continued her studies, receiving an LL.M. from Catholic University of America in 1939.

== Legal and judicial career ==
Scott worked as an attorney in the Office of Chief Counsel until 1950, when she became Special Assistant to the Head of the Appeals Division. She also served as a member of the agency's Excess Profits Tax Council from 1950 to 1952. In 1959, she became Staff Assistant to the Chief Counsel. In May 1960, President Dwight D. Eisenhower appointed Scott to a seat on the United States Tax Court, for term expiring June 1, 1972. This was one of several appointments which went against a previously observed Senate Resolution prohibiting the appointment to that body of persons recently employed by the Treasury Department. She was reappointed by President Richard Nixon on June 1, 1972 for an additional 15-year term. She received an honorary LL.D. from the University of Alabama, 1978, and took senior status in 1982, continuing to serve in that capacity until her death.

== Personal life ==
Scott married Thomas J. Scott in 1939, with whom she had two children, Thomas J., Jr. and Irene. Scott's husband died in 1986. She lived for eleven years thereafter, and was buried in Arlington National Cemetery.
