= Peter Panuthos =

American judge (born 1943)

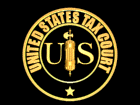
United States Tax Court logo.

Peter J. Panuthos (born 1943 in New York City) a special trial judge of the United States Tax Court.

== Education ==
Panuthos attended public schools in New York City and graduated from Erasmus Hall High School in 1961. He attended Bernard Baruch School of Business of CUNY, and received a B.S. from Bryant College in 1966. He attended law school at Suffolk University, where he received a J.D. in 1969. He also received an LL.M. in taxation from Boston University School of Law in 1972.

== Career ==
From 1970 to 1983, Panuthos was a trial attorney and assistant district counsel at the Boston Office of Chief Counsel of the Internal Revenue Service. He was appointed a Special Trial Judge of the United States Tax Court on June 12, 1983. He has also taught tax procedure and substantive tax courses as an adjunct professor at Bentley College, The Catholic University of America, Columbus School of Law, and the David A. Clarke School of Law, University of the District of Columbia. He has served as Chief Special Trial Judge from June 1, 1992.
