= Stephen E. Rice =

American judge (1905–1958)

Stephen Ewing Rice (July 23, 1905 – February 9, 1958) was a judge of the United States Tax Court from 1950 until his death in 1958.

Born in Apalachicola, Florida, Rice attended Marion Military Institute and graduated from the United States Naval Academy in 1926, followed by an LL.B. from the Columbia Law School.

Rice served in the office of legislative counsel to the United States Senate, and served as an officer in United States Navy during World War II, aboard the USS Lexington. After being wounded in 1944, he "returned to the States and retired as a captain", receiving the Purple Heart. On October 16, 1950, President Harry S. Truman appointed Rice to a seat on the Tax Court, vacated by the retirement of William W. Arnold. Rice was confirmed by the United States Senate on September 8, 1950. In 1956, Rice was reappointed by President Dwight D. Eisenhower and confirmed to a new twelve year term on the court.

Rice married Lida Johns, with whom he had two sons. He died at the naval medical center in Bethesda, Maryland, at the age of 52. He was interred at Arlington National Cemetery, with full military honors.
