= D. Irvin Couvillion =

American judge (born 1934)

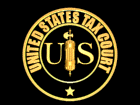

David Irvin Couvillion (1934 – October 17, 2015) was a special trial judge of the United States Tax Court. He was appointed to that position by the Chief Judge on July 1, 1985, and served until 2008.

Prior to his lengthy service on the Tax Court, Couvillion was engaged in tax litigation in Baton Rouge, Louisiana for a decade. Before entering private practice, he had been an Administrative Assistant to U.S. Representative Speedy O. Long, from Louisiana's Eighth District, from 1966 to 1973.

Couvillion earned a B.S. in accounting from Louisiana State University, 1956; a J.D. from Louisiana State University Law School, 1959; and an LL.M. in Taxation from Georgetown University Law Center, Washington, D.C., 1973.

== Note ==
Material on this page was copied from the website of the United States Tax Court, which is published by a United States government agency, and is therefore in the public domain.
