= James S.Y. Ivins =

American judge (1885–1960)

James Sterling Yard Ivins (December 23, 1885 – May 25, 1960) was a judge of the United States Board of Tax Appeals (later the United States Tax Court) from 1924 to 1925.

A New York city accountant and an authority in tax work, Ivins was the deputy attorney general of New York from 1915 to 1923, and served as director of the New York Income Tax Bureau.

He was one of the original twelve members appointed to the United States Board of Tax Appeals by President Calvin Coolidge, and one of a group of seven appointed "from the public". Ivins notified the court of his intent to resign in 1925, testifying before a Congressional committee that his resignation was prompted by the low salary given to board members.

Following his service on the board, Ivins and fellow member Percy W. Phillips joined with tax lawyer Richard Barker to form the law firm of Ivins Phillips Barker.

Ivins retired from legal practice in 1953, and moved to Marathon, Florida. He died in a hospital in Miami, Florida in 1960, at the age of 74. He graduated from Harvard College and Harvard Law School.
