= Edna G. Parker =

American judge (1930–1996)

- Born: October 30, 1930; Meadow, North Carolina, U.S.
- Died: November 12, 1996 (aged 66); Washington, D.C., U.S.
- Spouse: Jack Goldberg (divorced)
- Children: 1

Edna Gaynell Parker (October 30, 1930 – November 12, 1996) was a judge of the United States Tax Court from 1980 to 1995.

== Early life and education ==
Born in Meadow, Johnston County, North Carolina, Parker came to Washington, D.C. as a child, and graduated from Eastern High School.

After attending the New Jersey College for Women (later Douglass Residential College), she received a B.A. with honors from the University of Arizona in 1953. She then attended the University of Arizona College of Law before receiving an LL.B. from the George Washington University Law School in 1957, where she was on the law review, and inducted into the Order of the Coif. She then served as a law clerk to Judge J. Warren Madden and Chief Judge Marvin Jones of the United States Court of Claims from 1957 to 1959.

== Legal career ==
After serving as an attorney-adviser in the Office of General Counsel for the United States Department of the Navy from 1959 to 1960, Parker was a trial attorney in the Civil and Tax Divisions of the United States Department of Justice from 1960 to 1969. She became an Administrative Judge for the Contract Appeals Board in the United States Department of Transportation, serving in that capacity from 1969 to 1977. On September 1, 1977, Parker was appointed a special trial judge of the United States Tax Court, holding that office until President Jimmy Carter appointed her as a regular judge of the Tax Court in 1980. She took her oath of office on May 30, 1980, and served until her death from cancer, at Washington Hospital Center.

== Personal life ==
Parker married Jack Goldberg, whom she later divorced, thereafter resuming her maiden name. They had one son, Douglas Benjamin Parker, who legally changed his last name to that of his mother.
