= Sumner L. Trussell =

American judge (1860–1931)

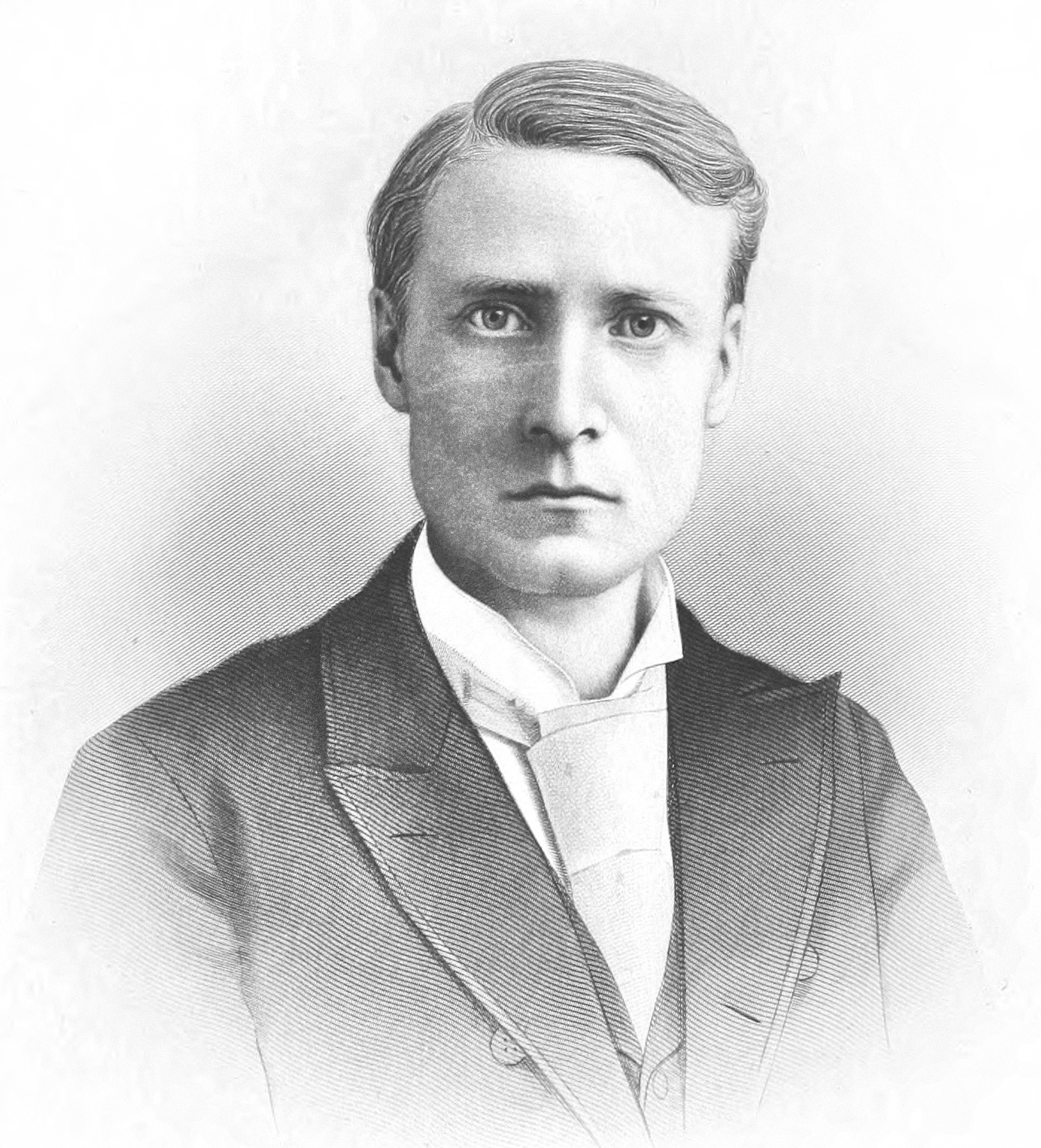
Trussell, c. 1895

Sumner Lincoln Trussell (October 29, 1860 – October 22, 1931) was a judge of the United States Board of Tax Appeals (later the United States Tax Court) from 1924 until his death in 1931.

Born in Champlin, Minnesota, Trussell received a B.A. from the University of Minnesota and a law degree from Columbia Law School, entering the practice of law in 1885. Trussell joined the Internal Revenue Department in 1889, returning to private practice in 1894, then to government in 1898, and back to private practice in 1916. While again working as a Minneapolis lawyer, he was appointed to the Board of Tax Appeals by President Calvin Coolidge, and was one of the original twelve members appointed to the Board, one of seven appointed "from the public".

Trussell died while on vacation in Sisseton, South Dakota, and was buried in Champlin, Minnesota.
