= Ernest H. Van Fossan =

American judge (1888–1970)

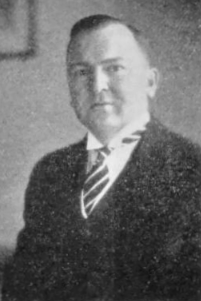

Judge of the United States Tax Court
- In office 1926–1961

Personal details
- Born: September 6, 1888 Lisbon, Ohio, U.S.
- Died: May 27, 1970 (aged 81) Lisbon, Ohio, U.S.
- Resting place: Arlington National Cemetery
- Spouse: Frances Hawthorne Brady (m. 1926; died 1958)
- Education: Oberlin College (AB); Columbia University (AM, LLB)
- Occupation: Lawyer, judge

Military service
- Allegiance: United States
- Rank: Captain
- Battles/wars: World War I

Ernest Harvey Van Fossan (September 6, 1888 – May 27, 1970) was a judge of the United States Tax Court from 1926 to 1961.

== Early life and education ==
Ernest H. Van Fossan was born in Lisbon, Ohio on September 6, 1888. He received an A.B. from Oberlin College in 1909, followed by an A.M. and an LL.B. from Columbia University in 1913.

== Career ==
Van Fossan was admitted to the Ohio bar in 1913 and practiced law in Lisbon until 1917. During World War I, he served in the military as a captain from May 1917 to January 1920. He was promoted to major in the Judge Advocate General's Reserve and performed duties in the Office of the Secretary of War and the Inspector General's Department. In 1919, he participated in an inspection and survey of the Panama Canal Zone Government and became a member of the War Department Claims Board and Chief Counsel and resident member of the War Credits Board.

After his military service, Van Fossan practiced law in Washington, D.C., from 1924 to 1926. He also worked as Assistant Counsel and Director of Claims at the U.S. Shipping Board between 1921 and 1924. On June 8, 1926, he was appointed to the U.S. Board of Tax Appeals, now known as the Tax Court. He was reappointed in 1932 and 1944, officially retiring in 1955. However, he was recalled to perform additional judicial duties the following day and continued to serve.

== Personal life and death ==
In 1926, he married Frances Hawthorne Brady, who died September 2, 1958.

Van Fossan died at his home in Lisbon, Ohio on May 28, 1970, and was buried at Arlington National Cemetery.
