= Craig S. Atkins =

American judge (1903–1990)

Craig Starbuck Atkins (August 17, 1903 – June 2, 1990) was a judge of the United States Tax Court from 1955 to 1972.

== Early life, education, and career ==
Born in Greensboro, North Carolina, Atkins attended the public schools in Baltimore, Maryland, and Baltimore Polytechnic Institute. He received an A.B. from the University of North Carolina in 1923, and an LL.B. from the George Washington University Law School in 1925. He gained admission to the District of Columbia bar in 1925.

Atkins was an attorney for the U.S. Board of Tax Appeals from 1927 to 1937, and then an attorney and assistant head in the interpretative division of the office of chief counsel, Internal Revenue Service, from 1937 to 1949. He was a tax advisor to the Economic Cooperation Administration mission to Greece from 1949 to 1951, thereafter returning to his position as assistant head of the interpretative division until 1954. From 1954 to 1955, he was a special assistant and assistant chief counsel.

== U.S. Tax Court service ==
In 1954, President Dwight D. Eisenhower appointed Atkins to a seat on the United States Tax Court. This was one of several appointments which went against a previously observed Senate Resolution prohibiting the appointment to that body of persons recently employed by the Treasury Department. Atkins took his oath of office as judge on September 1, 1955 for a term set to expire June 1, 1962. Following the expiration of this term, he was reappointed for another term by President John F. Kennedy, serving a total of 17 years on the court.

== Personal life and death ==
Atkins married Margaret Denty, with whom he had a son, Craig S. Jr., and a daughter Constance. Margaret died in 1967, and in 1969 Atkins remarried, becoming the stepfather to the two children of second wife, Lucille.

Atkins retired to Fort Myers, Florida, in 1986. He died at Coral Trace Manor in that city at the age of 83, after "suffering from Alzheimer's disease for some time".
