= Norman O. Tietjens =

American judge (1903–1983)

Norman Orwig Tietjens (July 3, 1903 – September 2, 1983) was a judge of the United States Tax Court from 1950 to 1971.

== Early life, education, and career ==
Born in Napoleon, Ohio, Tietjens attended public schools in Napoleon, and received a Ph.B. from Brown University in 1925 (magna cum laude), and was an instructor at Napoleon High School from 1925 to 1926. He received an M.A. from Brown University in 1927, and a J.D. from the University of Michigan Law School with distinction in 1930, and while there was an associate editor of the Michigan Law Review from 1929 to 1930, and a member of Phi Beta Kappa and the Order of the Coif.

After gaining admission to the bar in Ohio and the District of Columbia, he practiced law in Toledo, Ohio from 1930 to 1932 and in Napoleon from 1932 to 1933, when he moved to Washington, D.C., to serve as special counsel in the Federal Emergency Administration of Public Works. In 1937, he became counsel to the Federal Maritime Commission, and a year later, became an attorney in the Office of the General Counsel of the United States Department of the Treasury. From 1939 to 1950, Tietjens was an Assistant General Counsel of the Treasury Department.

== Judicial service ==
In 1950, Tietjens was appointed by President Harry S. Truman to be a Judge of the United States Tax Court". This was one of several appointments which went against a previously observed Senate Resolution prohibiting the appointment to that body of persons recently employed by the Treasury Department. Tietjens took the oath of office on August 30, 1950, and was reappointed for succeeding term by President John F. Kennedy on June 2, 1962. From July 1, 1961 to June 30, 1967, Tietjens was Chief Judge of the Tax Court, having been elected by his fellow Judges for three consecutive terms. Initial plans for a courthouse for the body began during his tenure as Chief Judge. He retired on June 1, 1971, but was recalled to perform further judicial duties on June 2, 1971.

== Personal life and death ==
In 1936, Tietjens married Lucretia Larkin, affectionately known as "Cre". They had two daughters, Corinne and Anne. Cre died sixteen months before Tietjens, who suffered from the loss and from failing health for the remainder of his life.

Tietjens died at the age of 80.
