= John J. Marquette =

American judge (1879–1935)

John Jerome Marquette (April 22, 1879 – October 26, 1935) was a judge of the United States Board of Tax Appeals (later the United States Tax Court) from 1924 to 1935.

Born in Utica, New York, Marquette received his law degree from the University of North Dakota, and entered the practice of law in Missoula, Montana. He served in the United States Army for two years during the Spanish–American War, in the Philippines, and again during World War I, in the United States Army Air Corps. After a fall at Bolling Field in 1919, he was hospitalized at Walter Reed Hospital for one year. He resigned as captain in December 1920, following his discharge from the hospital.

He remained in Washington to practice law there. In 1920, Marquette joined the office of the solicitor in the Internal Revenue Bureau, where he was a legal adviser until President Calvin Coolidge appointed him to the Board of Tax Appeals in 1924. He was one of the original twelve members appointed to the Board of Tax Appeals, and one of a group of seven appointed "from the public".

In 1935, Marquette travelled to California to hear a case regarding the estate of railroad builder Henry E. Huntington. On the train ride returning to Washington, D.C., Marquette contracted pneumonia, dying at Sibley Memorial Hospital at the age of 56.
