= Clarence V. Opper =

American judge (1897–1964)

Clarence Victor Opper

Judge of the United States Tax Court
- In office February 28, 1938 – June 19, 1964
- Appointed by: Franklin D. Roosevelt
- Preceded by: Logan Morris

Personal details
- Born: April 13, 1897 New York City, U.S.
- Died: June 19, 1964 (aged 67) George Washington University Hospital, Washington, D.C., U.S.
- Spouse: Lucy Berlin (m. 1931)
- Children: 1
- Education: Dartmouth College (A.B.); Columbia Law School (LL.B.)

Clarence Victor Opper (April 13, 1897 – June 19, 1964) was a judge of the United States Tax Court from 1938 to 1964.

== Early life, education, and military service ==
Born in New York City to Victor M. and Alice G. Opper, he enlisted in the U.S. Army, 301st Field Signal Battery during World War I, in May 1917. He served until February 1919, achieving the rank of second lieutenant, and during his service also received an A.B. from Dartmouth College in 1918. He received an LL.B. from Columbia University in 1921, and was an editor of the Columbia Law Review from 1920 to 1921.

== Legal career ==
Following his graduation, he was admitted to the New York State Bar. He entered the practice of law in New York City from 1921 to 1931, and was then counsel to the City Housing Corporation until 1933. He was than appointed assistant general counsel of the Farm Credit Administration until 1934, when he became assistant general counsel to the United States Department of the Treasury, supervising legal work concerned with fiscal, monetary banking, and foreign exchange questions. He conducted the Treasury Department's participation in gold and monetary litigation, specifically the Gold Clause Cases decided by the Supreme Court of the United States. In the period before World War II, he helped craft the legal justification for the Roosevelt Administration's refusal to export helium to Nazi Germany.

== Judicial service ==
On February 28, 1938, President Franklin D. Roosevelt appointed Opper to fill a seat on the United States Board of Tax Appeals (now the United States Tax Court) vacated by the resignation of Logan Morris. This was one of several appointments which went against a previously observed Senate Resolution prohibiting the appointment to that body of persons recently employed by the Treasury Department. Opper was reappointed for a full term on June 2, 1938, and was reappointed by President Harry S. Truman on June 2, 1950, and by President John F. Kennedy on June 2, 1962.

== Personal life ==
He married Lucy Berlin in 1931, with whom he had a daughter, Susanna. Two years into his last term on the Tax Court, Opper died at the George Washington University Hospital, at the age of 67.
