= Revenue Act of 1924 =

American federal tax legislation

- Other short titles: Mellon tax bill
- Long title: An Act To reduce and equalize taxation, to provide revenue, and for other purposes
- Enacted by: the 68th United States Congress
- Effective: June 2, 1924

Citations
- Public law: Pub. L. 68–176
- Statutes at Large: 43 Stat. 253

Codification
- Acts repealed: Revenue Act of 1921
- Titles amended: 26

Legislative history
- Introduced in the House as H.R. 6715 by William R. Green; Committee consideration by House Ways and Means; Passed the House on; Passed the Senate on; Signed into law by President Calvin Coolidge on June 2, 1924

Major amendments
- Revenue Act of 1926

The United States Revenue Act of 1924 (43 Stat. 253) (June 2, 1924), also known as the Mellon tax bill (after U.S. Secretary of the Treasury Andrew Mellon) cut federal tax rates for 1924 income. The bottom rate, on income under $4,000, fell from 1.5% to 1.125%.

The Act also:

- Established the U.S. Board of Tax Appeals, which was later renamed the United States Tax Court in 1942.
- Gave the chair of the House Ways and Means Committee the power to obtain the records for any taxpayer, in response to the Teapot Dome scandal.
- Declared that there were no longer any "Indians, not taxed" to be not counted for purposes of United States congressional apportionment. A parallel act, the Indian Citizenship Act of 1924 (43 Stat. 25, Ch. 233 (1924)), granted all non-citizen resident Indians citizenship.

President Calvin Coolidge signed the bill into law.

From 2019 to 2022, the law was the subject of a court battle that resulted in the Ways and Means Committee obtaining the tax returns of Donald Trump.

== Tax levels ==
Both a normal tax and a surtax were levied against the net income of individuals, as shown in the following table:

Revenue Act of 1924 Normal Tax and Surtax on Individuals
Net Income (dollars)	Normal Rate (percent)	Surtax Rate (percent)	Combined Rate (percent)
0	2	0	2
4,000	4	0	4
8,000	6	0	6
10,000	6	1	7
14,000	6	2	8
16,000	6	3	9
18,000	6	4	10
20,000	6	5	11
22,000	6	6	12
24,000	6	7	13
26,000	6	8	14
28,000	6	9	15
30,000	6	10	16
34,000	6	11	17
36,000	6	12	18
38,000	6	13	19
42,000	6	14	20
44,000	6	15	21
46,000	6	16	22
48,000	6	17	23
50,000	6	18	24
52,000	6	19	25
56,000	6	20	26
58,000	6	21	27
62,000	6	22	28
64,000	6	23	29
66,000	6	24	30
68,000	6	25	31
70,000	6	26	32
74,000	6	27	33
76,000	6	28	34
80,000	6	29	35
82,000	6	30	36
84,000	6	31	37
88,000	6	32	38
90,000	6	33	39
92,000	6	34	40
94,000	6	35	41
96,000	6	36	42
100,000	6	37	43
200,000	6	38	44
300,000	6	39	45
500,000	6	40	46

- Exemption of $1,000 for single filers and $2,500 for married couples and heads of family. A $400 exemption for each dependent under 18.

== See also ==
- Revenue Act of 1926
