= Clarence P. LeMire =

American judge, legislator, college football coach (1886–1961)

Biographical details
- Born: April 3, 1886; Martinsville, Missouri, U.S.
- Died: October 4, 1961 (aged 75); Bethany, Missouri, U.S.

Playing career
- 1910–1912: Missouri
- Position: Halfback

Coaching career (HC unless noted)
- 1913–1916: Westminster (MO)

Head coaching record
- Overall: 9–13–3

Clarence Plato LeMire (April 13, 1886 – October 4, 1961) was an American judge, legislator, and college football coach. He served as a judge of the United States Tax Court from 1946 to 1956.

Born in Martinsville, Missouri, LeMire attended the public schools and received an LL.B. from the University of Missouri School of Law in 1912, also serving as captain of the school football team that year. As a result of the latter activity, he gained the enduring nickname, "Cap". He practiced law in Fulton, Missouri from 1913 to 1917, also coaching football at Westminster College during this time, and serving as an assistant attorney general of Missouri from 1917 to 1920. He moved to Kansas City, Missouri, in 1921, practicing law there until 46, also serving as a member of the Missouri State Legislature from 1927 to 1928.

In 1946, President Harry S. Truman appointed LeMire to a seat on the United States Tax Court, for which LeMire took his oath of office on June 17, 1946, for a term expiring June 2, 1958. Following his retirement from the court at the end of this term, LeMire moved to Bethany, Missouri.

LeMire married Erville Delavan, with whom he had one daughter. LeMire died at Noll Memorial Hospital in Bethany, at the age of 75, following a year-long period of poor health.

== Head coaching record ==
=== Football ===
Year	Team	Overall	Conference	Standing	Bowl/playoffs
Westminster Blue Jays (Missouri Intercollegiate Athletic Association) (1913–1916)
1913	Westminster				
1914	Westminster				
1915	Westminster	3–2–2	3–1–1	3rd	
1916	Westminster	2–4–1	2–4–1	8th	
Westminster:		9–13–3			
Total:		9–13–3			
