= Richard L. Disney =

American judge (1887–1976)

Richard Lester Disney (June 6, 1887 – February 17, 1976) was a judge of the United States Tax Court from 1936 to 1951.

== Early life, education, and career ==
Born in Richland, Kansas, he was the brother of future-Congressman Wesley E. Disney. Disney was a Rhodes Scholar, and received a Bachelor of Arts in Jurisprudence from the University of Oxford in 1912. After moving to Oklahoma, where he entered the practice of law, Disney served two terms in the Oklahoma House of Representatives, representing Muskogee County as a Democrat from 1914 to 1917.

== Judicial service and later life ==
In 1936, President Franklin D. Roosevelt nominated Disney to a seat on the United States Board of Tax Appeals. At the time, Disney was himself a candidate for a seat in the United States Congress, from which he indicated he would not withdraw until confirmed by the U.S. Senate for the Board of Tax Appeals appointment. Disney was reappointed to President Harry S. Truman, and retired from the United States Tax Court effective December 31, 1951. He thereafter "headed the Rhodes Scholarship Committee in Oklahoma for a generation".

== Personal life and death ==
On September 6, 1914, Disney married Harriet Florence Mitchell in Neodesha, Kansas, with whom he had two sons and two daughters. Harriet died in 1959, and Disney died in 1976, and the age of 88.
