= John O. Colvin =

American judge (1946–2024)

John Orlin Colvin
- Born: November 17, 1946
- Died: March 11, 2024 (aged 77)
- Education: University of Missouri (BA, JD); Georgetown University Law Center (LLM)
- Occupations: Lawyer, judge
- Known for: Judge of the United States Tax Court (1988–2019)

John Orlin Colvin (November 17, 1946 – March 11, 2024) was an American lawyer who served as a judge of the United States Tax Court from 1988 to 2004.

== Life and career ==
Colvin received a Bachelor of Arts from the University of Missouri in 1968, and completed a Juris Doctor there in 1971. He earned a Master of Laws in taxation from the Georgetown University Law Center in 1978. During college and law school he was employed by a private firm, Niedner, Niedner, Nack and Bodeux, of St. Charles, Missouri, and also worked for a number of political figures, including Missouri Attorney General John C. Danforth and Missouri State Representative Richard C. Marshall, both in Jefferson City; and for Senator Mark O. Hatfield and Congressman Thomas B. Curtis, in Washington, D.C.

From 1975 to 1984, Colvin served as tax counsel to Senator Bob Packwood, and thereafter was counsel to the Senate Finance Committee for several years, and also served as an adjunct professor of law at Georgetown University Law Center, beginning in 1987.

On September 1, 1988, Colvin was appointed by President Ronald Reagan as judge of the United States Tax Court on September 1, 1988, for a term ending August 31, 2003. He was reappointed by President George W. Bush on August 12, 2004, for a term ending August 11, 2019. Colvin was elected chief judge of the U.S. Tax Court effective June 1, 2006, and reelected effective June 1, 2008, and June 1, 2010. He also served as interim chief judge from March 8 to August 6, 2013.

Colvin died on March 11, 2024, at the age of 77.

== Other ==
- Admitted to practice law in Missouri, 1971, and District of Columbia, 1974.
- Office of the Chief Counsel, United States Coast Guard, Washington, D.C., 1971-75.
- Officer, Tax Section, Federal Bar Association, since 1978.

== Attribution ==
Material on this page was copied from the website of the United States Tax Court, which is published by a United States government agency, and is therefore in the public domain.
