= Charles M. Trammell =

American judge (1886–1967)

Charles Monroe Trammell

Personal details
- Born: July 6, 1886 Lakeland, Florida
- Died: July 26, 1967 (aged 81) Washington, D.C.
- Education: Emory University (Ph.B.); Vanderbilt University Law School (LL.B.)
- Occupation: Judge
- Known for: Judge of the United States Board of Tax Appeals

Military service
- Allegiance: United States
- Branch/service: United States Army Air Corps; Judge Advocate General's Corps, United States Army
- Years of service: 1917–1919; World War II

Charles Monroe Trammell (July 6, 1886 – July 26, 1967) was a judge of the United States Board of Tax Appeals (later the United States Tax Court) from 1924 to 1936.

== Early life, education, and military service ==
Born in Lakeland, Florida, Trammell's father was a pioneer who had homesteaded 80-acre (32 ha) of Polk County, Florida, much of which became Lakeland. Trammell received a Ph.B. from Emory University and an LL.B. from the Vanderbilt University Law School. Returning to Polk County to enter the practice of law in 1909, he was elected judge of the County Court of Polk County, Florida, in 1913. At the time, he was the youngest county court judge in the state. Trammell served in that capacity until 1917, when he left to serve in World War I, first entering the United States Army Air Corps, and in March 1919, transferring to the office of the Judge Advocate General's Corps.

== Washington, D.C., legal career ==
Trammell was appointed to the solicitor's office in Washington, D.C., on October 11, 1920, and then appointed to the United States Board of Tax Appeals in 1924. He was one of the original twelve members appointed to the Board, and one of a group of five appointed "from the Bureau of Internal Revenue". Trammell was a cousin of United States Senator Park Trammell, of Florida, a fact that complicated his appointment to the board.

Trammell served on the board for twelve years, until 1936. After leaving the board, he was retained by the Associated Gas and Electric Company in a $40 million matter, for which Trammell's retainer was large enough to stir government concerns about officials leaving government to represent private clients against the United States.

== World War II service and later life ==
During World War II, he again served in the office of the Judge Advocate General, first with the office of the Administrator of Export Control and later with the Board of Economic Warfare.

In 1950, Trammell "announced the opening of offices for the practice of law specializing in tax matters at the Denrike Building, Washington, D.C.", and in 1955, Trammell was noted as serving as legal counsel in the tax evasion trial of wealthy Miami businessman Howard G. Pinder. In 1960, he was selected as a Trustee of his alma mater, Emory University.

Trammell died in Washington, D.C., at the age of 81.
