= Austin Hoyt =

American judge (1915–1976)

Austin Hoyt (April 26, 1915 – June 21, 1976) was a judge of the United States Tax Court from 1962 to 1973.

Born in Beacon, New York, to Judge Ferdinand A. and Beatrice Watson Hoyt, he graduated from Beacon High School and attended the University of Alabama and St. John's University. He received his LL.B. degree in 1938 from the University of Virginia School of Law, where he was a member of the Law Review Board and the Order of the Coif. He was admitted to the Bars of the District of Columbia, New York, and Colorado. From 1938 to 1940, Hoyt served as an attorney with the Rural Electrification Administration. He then practiced law in Beacon until 1942, when he became a Special Attorney with the Antitrust Division and later the Criminal Division of the United States Department of Justice. An officer in the United States Naval Reserve, Hoyt was on active duty during World War II from 1944 to 1946. He first served in the Procurement Legal Division in the Navy Department and then as Flag Secretary and Air Combat Intelligence Officer with the Pacific Fleet, achieving the rank of Lieutenant. After the war, he returned to the Department of Justice where he acted as Special Assistant to the Attorney General in the Tax Division until he resigned in 1949 to enter private practice in Colorado Springs, Colorado, as a member of the firm Ziegler & Hoyt. Later, he became senior partner in the firm of Hoyt & Gallagher.

In 1959, he was appointed District Judge for the Fourth Judicial District of Colorado, and he continued in that capacity until 1961, when he resumed the private practice of law. In 1962, Hoyt was appointed Judge of the United States Tax Court by President John F. Kennedy for the term expiring June 1, 1974, to succeed Judge John Worth Kern, who retired. Hoyt wrote well-regarded opinions in such cases as Dow Jones & Co, 41 T.C. 102, and Twentieth Century-Fox Film Corp., 45 T.C. 137. The latter case concerned the treatment of gain from the sale of the motion picture film A Streetcar Named Desire adapted from the stage play by Tennessee Williams. Hoyt consented to serve on recall for the performance of further judicial duties with the Tax Court following his retirement on October 31, 1973, from regular full-time service.

Hoyt married Margaret Llewellyn Carter of Virginia in 1939, with whom he had a son, John Carter Hoyt, and two daughters, Julia Hoyt Rolland and Dale Llewellyn Hoyt. He died in Caroline County, Virginia, after "a long and trying illness".
