= Perry Shields =

American judge (1925–2002)

Perry Shields (January 12, 1925 – January 14, 2002) was a judge of the United States Tax Court.

Born in Townsend, Blount County, Tennessee, Shields graduated from Everett High School in Maryville, Tennessee in 1943, and enlisted in the U.S. Army. He attended Yale University and Princeton University while in the Army before being assigned as a medical aide in the 104th Infantry Division. In 1944 he was in combat in World War II, serving in France, Belgium, the Netherlands, and Germany. He was severely wounded near Aachen, Germany, resulting in the amputation of his left leg. After he returned to the United States and recovered from his injuries, Shields attended undergraduate school at Duke University for two years before entering its law school. He received his law degree from the Duke University School of Law in 1950.

After serving two years as a revenue agent with the Internal Revenue Service, Shields became an attorney in the Chief Counsel's Office, Internal Revenue Service, where he served in Washington, D.C., in the Claims Division. From 1954 to 1956 he was a civil advisory and trial attorney in the IRS Regional Counsel's offices in Atlanta, Georgia, and Greensboro, North Carolina. Shields returned to Tennessee to enter private practice, specializing in tax matters, in Knoxville and Chattanooga from 1956 until 1982.

On November 14, 1981, Shields was appointed to the United States Tax Court by President Ronald Reagan, taking the oath of office on February 5, 1982. He assumed senior status on April 1, 1994, and continued to serve as a senior judge on recall until his retirement on July 1, 1994.

Shields died in Knoxville, Tennessee from complications from a stroke. He was interred with military honors in the Bethel Baptist Church Cemetery at Townsend, Tennessee. He was survived by his wife of 50 years, Bonnie Shields; a son, Bailey, of Maryville, Tennessee; two daughters, Leslie, of Knoxville, Tennessee, and Beth, of Savannah, Georgia; and three grandchildren.

== Notes ==
- Material on this page was adapted from a January 17, 2002 press release issued by the United States Tax Court, a document in the public domain as a publication of the United States government.
