= Allin H. Pierce =

American judge (1897–1980)

Allin Hugh Pierce (January 18, 1897 – February 14, 1980) was a judge of the United States Tax Court from 1955 to 1967.

== Biography ==
Born in Graceville, Minnesota, Pierce attended public schools in Minnesota and Fort Dodge, Iowa. He was an aviation cadet in the United States Navy Reserve during World War I, in 1918, and thereafter received an A.B. from Swarthmore College in 1919, and a J.D. from the University of Chicago Law School, cum laude, in 1923.

He entered the practice of law with a specialization in federal taxation. In 1928, he joined the office of the Chief Counsel of the Internal Revenue Service, where he remained until 1936. He also lectured extensively in Federal taxation before various institutes bar associations, and conferences.

In 1955, President Dwight Eisenhower appointed Pierce to a seat on the United States Tax Court, for which he took his oath of office on March 21, 1955. Among the cases that Pierce presided over was a noted 1958 matter in which he filed a stipulation permitting a $60,000 settlement in favor of actress Hedy Lamarr. He was later reappointed for term expiring June 1, 1972.

Pierce married Florence Bennet, with whom he had a son and a daughter. He died in Santa Barbara, California, where he had retired.
