= David Laro =

American judge (1942–2018)

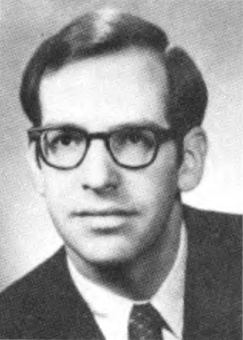
David Laro c. 1975

David Laro (March 3, 1942 – September 21, 2018) was an American senior judge of the United States Tax Court.

Born in Flint, Michigan, Laro graduated from the University of Michigan in 1964, earned a Juris Doctor from the University of Illinois Law School in 1967 and a Master of Laws in Taxation from New York University Law School in 1970.

He was admitted to Michigan Bar, and United States District Court (Eastern District) in 1968. He was a partner in the law firm of Winegarden, Booth, Shedd, and Laro from 1970 to 1975; member of the law firm of Laro and Borgeson from 1975 to 1986; and a solo practitioner from 1986 to 1992.

Laro was appointed by President George H. W. Bush as Judge, United States Tax Court, on November 2, 1992, for a term ending November 1, 2007. Following the end of this term, he continued to serve as a senior judge on the court. He died on September 21, 2018.

== International taxation work ==
At the request of the American Bar Association and the Central and Eastern European Law Initiative, Laro contributed written comments on the Draft Laws of Ukraine and Uzbekistan and on the creation of specialized courts in Eastern Europe. As a consultant for Harvard University (Harvard Institute for International Development), and Georgia State University, he lectured in Moscow to Russian judges on the subject of tax reform and litigation procedures in May 1997 and December 1998. Laro was a commentator for the American Bar Association's Central and East European Law Initiative on the draft laws of Uzbekistan, Kazakhstan, Slovakia, Ukraine, and the Republic of Macedonia. He has lectured to Judges and tax officials in Azerbaijan on tax reform.

== Other activities ==
- Counsel to Dykema Gossett, Ann Arbor, MI, 1989–90
- President and chief executive officer of Durakon Industries, Inc., 1989–91
- Chairman, Board of Durakon Industries, Inc., 1991–92
- Chairman, Board of Republic Bank, 1986–92
- Vice Chairman and co-founder of Republic Bancorp, Inc. 1986-92
- Regent, University of Michigan Board of Regents, 1975–81
- Member, Michigan State Board of Education, 1982–83
- Chairman, Michigan State Tenure Commission, 1972–75
- Commissioner, Civil Service Commission, Flint, MI, 1984–85
- Commissioner of Police, Flint, 1972–74
- Member, Political Leadership Program, Institute of Public Policy and Social Research
- Member, Ann Arbor Art Association Board of Directors
- Member, Holocaust Foundation (Ann Arbor)
- Adjunct professor of law, Georgetown University Law School
- Instructor, National Institute for Trial Advocacy
- Visiting professor, University of San Diego Law School
- Member, National Advisory Committee for New York University Law School.

== Attribution ==
Material on this page was copied from the website of the United States Tax Court, which is published by a United States government agency, and is therefore in the public domain.
