= J. Edgar Murdock =

American judge (1894–1977)

J. Edgar Murdock (1894 – May 2, 1977) was an American jurist who served as a chief judge of the United States Tax Court.

== Biography ==
J. Edgar Murdock was born in Greensburg, Pennsylvania in 1894. He graduated from Princeton University in 1916 with a Bachelor of Literature degree and a cum laude LL.B. from the University of Pittsburgh in 1921. He served in the United States Army during World War I, where he was commissioned as a first lieutenant and later promoted to captain, earning the Silver Star for gallantry in France.

Following his military service, he was appointed as the second assistant district attorney in Westmoreland County, Pennsylvania, in 1922, and later as the first assistant district attorney in 1925. Murdock was initially appointed to the United States Board of Tax Appeals (now the Tax Court) on June 9, 1926, and was reappointed in 1932 and 1944, with his term ending in 1956. He served as chairman and presiding judge from 1941 to 1945, and as chief judge starting July 1, 1955. He took retirement in 1968.

Murdock died in Denver, Colorado, at the age of 82.
