= Bruce Forrester =

American judge (1909-1995)

Judge of the United States Tax Court
- In office 1957–1984

Personal details
- Born: Bruce Millar Forrester; December 26, 1908 Kansas City, Missouri, U.S.
- Died: January 30, 1995 (aged 86) Chevy Chase, Maryland, U.S.
- Cause of death: Anemia
- Spouse: Anne Lee Broaddus Forrester
- Children: 3
- Education: University of Missouri; University of Missouri School of Law
- Occupation: Lawyer, judge

Bruce Millar Forrester (December 26, 1908 – January 30, 1995) was a judge of the United States Tax Court.

He was born in Kansas City, Missouri, and graduated from Pembroke Country-Day School in 1928. He earned his undergraduate degree from the University of Missouri, and then a law degree from the University of Missouri School of Law. Thereafter, he went into private practice in Kansas City and eventually became a partner in a law firm.

On April 24, 1957, President Dwight D. Eisenhower appointed Forrester to a seat on the United States Tax Court. He was confirmed by the United States Senate, and served actively until assuming senior status in 1978. He continued as a senior judge until his retirement in 1984. He had served on the bench for 27 years.

Forrester died in his home in Chevy Chase, Maryland, from dysplastic anemia, and was survived by his wife of 57 years, Anne Lee Broaddus Forrester, and three children.

== Sources ==
- "President Names 2 for Tax Court", The New York Times, April 24, 1957.
- "B.M. Forrester, U.S. Tax Judge, Dies At Age 86," The Washington Post, February 2, 1995.
