= Carolyn =

- Pronunciation: CA-ro-lin
- Gender: Feminine

Origin
- Origin: French

Other names
- Related names: Carolyne, Carolynne, Karolyn, Caroline, Carol, Charles

Carolyn is a female given name, a variant of Caroline. Other spellings include Carolin, Karolyn, Carolyne, Carolynn or Carolynne. Caroline itself is one of the feminine forms of Charles.

== List of notable people ==
- Carolyn Abbate, American musicologist
- Carolyn Abraham, Canadian journalist and author
- Carolyn Arends, musical artist
- Carolyn Aronson (born 1966), American Latina entrepreneur
- Carolyn Attneave (1920–1992), American psychologist
- Carolyn Banks, American writer
- Carolyn Barcus, American psychologist
- Carolyn Baxter, African-American poet, playwright, and musician
- Carolyn Baylies, American academic
- Carolyn Bennett (born 1950), Canadian politician
- Carolyn Bertozzi (born 1966), American chemist and Nobel laureate
- Carolyn Bertram (born 1976), Canadian politician
- Carolyn Bessette-Kennedy (1966–1999), wife of John F. Kennedy Jr.
- Carolyn Beug (1952–2001), American filmmaker
- Carolyn Bolivar-Getson (born 1964), Canadian politician
- Carolyn Barley Britton (born 1944), African-American medical doctor and neurologist
- Carolyn Brady, American painter
- Carolyn Bracken, Irish actor
- Carolyn Brown (choreographer) (born 1927), American dancer, choreographer, and writer
- Carolyn Brown (newsreader), English newsreader
- Carolyn Cassady (1923–2013), American writer and wife of Neal Cassady
- Carolyn Caton, American politician from Missouri
- C. J. Cherryh (Carolyn Janice Cherryh; born 1942), American science fiction and fantasy writer
- Carolyn Chiechi (born 1943), judge of the United States Tax Court
- Carolyn Cone (1899–1990), American politician
- Carolyn Cooper (born 1959), Jamaican author and literary scholar
- Carolyn Dando, New Zealand actress and singer
- Carolyn Davidson, several people
- Carolyn Dean, American historian
- Carolyn DeHoff (born 1967), American basketball coach
- Carolyn E. Demarest, American judge
- Carolyn Denning (1927–2016), American pediatrician
- Carolyn Dennis (born 1954), American singer
- Carolyn Eaton (1964–1982), American murder victim
- Carolyn Edmonds, American politician
- Carolyn Eisele (1902–2000), American mathematician and historian
- Carolyn Ellis, American communication scholar
- Carolyn Eslick, American politician
- Carolyn Evans, Griffith University Vice Chancellor
- Carolyn Fe, Filipina singer and actress
- Carolyn Forché (born 1950), American poet, editor, translator and human rights advocate
- Carolyn Franklin (1944–1988), American singer and songwriter, sister of Aretha Franklin
- Carolyn Gargasz (1938–2025), American politician
- Carolyn Bartlett Gast, American scientific illustrator
- Carolyn Gates, professor of veterinary science
- Carolyn Gray, Canadian Playwright
- Carolyn Halstead, American politician
- Carolyn Harris (born 1960), British politician
- Carolyn Lynnet Harris (1948–1994), American librarian
- Carolyn Wilson Harris (1849–1910), American lichenologist
- Carolyn Hart (born 1936), American mystery writer
- Carolyn Hax (born 1966), American writer and advice columnist
- Carolyn Hennesy (born 1962), American actress
- Carolyn Price Horton (1909–2001), American bookbinder and conservator
- Carolyn J. B. Howard (1938–2026), American politician from Maryland
- Carolyn Hunt (born 1937), American educator, politician, and First Lady of North Carolina
- Carolyn Ingvarson, Australian activist
- Carolyn Dawn Johnson (born 1971), Canadian country music singer-songwriter
- Carolyn Jones (1930–1983), American actress
- Carolyn Jones (politician), Canadian politician
- Carolyn Jones-Young (born 1969), American basketball player
- Carolyn Kaelin, American physician
- Carolyn Kagan, British community psychologist and social activist
- Carolyn Kawasaki, Japanese celebrity
- Carolyn Cheeks Kilpatrick (born 1945), American politician
- Carolyn Kizer (1925–2014), Pulitzer Prize-winning American poet
- Carolyn Kreiter-Foronda (born 1946), American poet
- Carolyn Lawrence (born 1967), American voice actress
- Carolyn Leigh (1926–1983), American lyricist
- Carolyn Ringer Lepre, American academic administrator
- Carolyn Lovewell, American scholar, author, and occultist
- Carolyn Lynch (1946–2015), American philanthropist
- Carolyn Mackler, American novelist
- Carolyn Mahoney (born 1946), American mathematician
- Carolyn Maloney (born 1946), American politician
- Carolyn Martin (born 1951), American academic, author and president of Amherst College
- Carolyn Matthews, American politician
- Carolyn L. Mazloomi (born 1948), African-American art historian and quilter
- Carolyn McCarthy (born 1944), American politician
- Carolyn McCormick (born 1959), American actress
- Carolyn McCurdie, British-born New Zealand author
- Carolyn D. Meadows (born 1938), American activist
- Carolyn Merchant (born 1936), American ecofeminist
- Carolyn Morris (1925–1996), pitcher in the All-American Girls Professional Baseball League
- Carolyn Omine (fl. 1990s–2020s), American television writer and producer
- Carolyn Miller Parr (born 1937), judge of the United States Tax Court
- Carolyn Parrish (born 1946), Canadian politician
- Carolyn Porco (born 1953), American planetary scientist
- Carolyn Reidy (1949–2020), president and CEO of the American publishing company Simon & Schuster
- Carolyn See (1934–2016), American author and reviewer
- Carolyn Seymour (born 1947), English actress
- Carolyn S. Shoemaker (1929–2021), American astronomer
- Carolyn Stewart-Olsen (born 1946), Canadian politician
- Carolyn Swords (born 1989), American former basketball player
- Carolyn F. Ulrich (1881–1969), American librarian
- Carolyn Watkinson (born 1949), English mezzo-soprano singer
- Carolyn D. Wright (1949–2016), American poet
- Carolyn Yarnell (born 1961), American composer and visual artist

== In fiction ==
- Carolyn Barek, on the television series Law & Order: Criminal Intent
- Carolyn Keene, pseudonym of the authors of the Nancy Drew and The Dana Girls mystery stories
- Carolyn Stoddard, from the soap opera Dark Shadows
- Princess Carolyn, from the adult animation series Bojack Horseman
- Carolyn Trainer, a supervillain from Marvel Comics, also known as Lady Octopus

== See also ==
- Carolan (surname)
- Caroly (name)
- "Carolyna"
- Carolyne
- Carolynn
- Karolyn
