= Alligator bait =

American racist trope

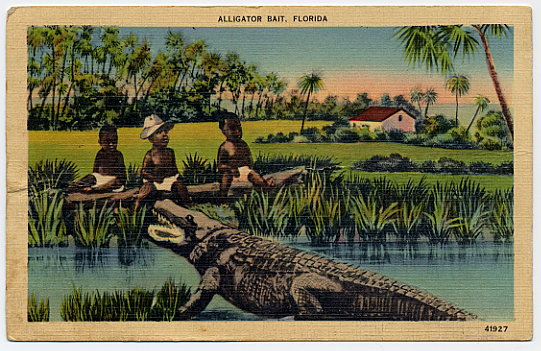
Early 20th century postcard depicting Black children as "alligator bait".

Depicting African-American children or infants as alligator bait was a common trope in American popular culture in the 19th and 20th centuries. Images of African-American children or infants being hunted by or used to lure alligators ("gators") was widespread in North American white popular culture during the 19th and 20th centuries. The motif was present in diverse forms of media, including newspaper reports, songs, sheet music, and visual art, often appearing in conjunction with other racist tropes.

A subtype of the pickaninny caricature, such images portrayed Black children as unlovable, disposable, and prey for predators. They were widely published in various media and forms from the late 19th century into the mid-20th century. They have been interpreted as expressions of a violent, dehumanizing attitude in which the endangerment and death of Black children and Black people in general was downplayed as a minor matter or implicitly even advertised as desirable.

The supposed actual use of Black children as bait in alligator hunting is repeatedly mentioned in primary sources, especially newspaper and magazine articles published between the 1880s and 1920s. But since most of them are vague and possibly jocular, their reliability is disputed. Historians and fact-checking website Snopes found no solid evidence that the practice was real, dismissing these accounts as rumors or racist tall tales. Other authors argue that due to their sheer number as well as details found in some of them, these accounts cannot be summarily dismissed as fabricated; instead, they contend some reflect a real, though likely not widespread, practice.

In American slang, alligator bait or gator bait is a racial slur for African Americans, implying they are worthless and expendable. This derogatory expression likely dates back to before the Civil War. Its racial connotations persist into the 21st century, prompting institutions like the University of Florida to abolish related chants because they could not be fully disentangled from the slur.

== Popular culture ==
In the American popular imagination, Black children were commonly used as bait for hunting alligators, which are one of the central apex predators of the folklore of the United States, along with cougars, bears and wolves. The reasons for dubbing Black babies "alligator bait" are unknown, but the identification may be a consequence of earlier associations of African crocodiles—a relative of American alligators—with Africa and its people. Alligators largely live in the swamplands of the Southern United States, which were one place people escaping enslavement hid to evade capture. According to popular legend, enslaved people who disappeared in swamps may have been killed by alligators; children were understood as particularly vulnerable to attacks by alligators, and that identification may have evolved into the bait image. Alligator lore draws from "a shared dread of these reptilian creatures that come out of the water to eat dogs and children."

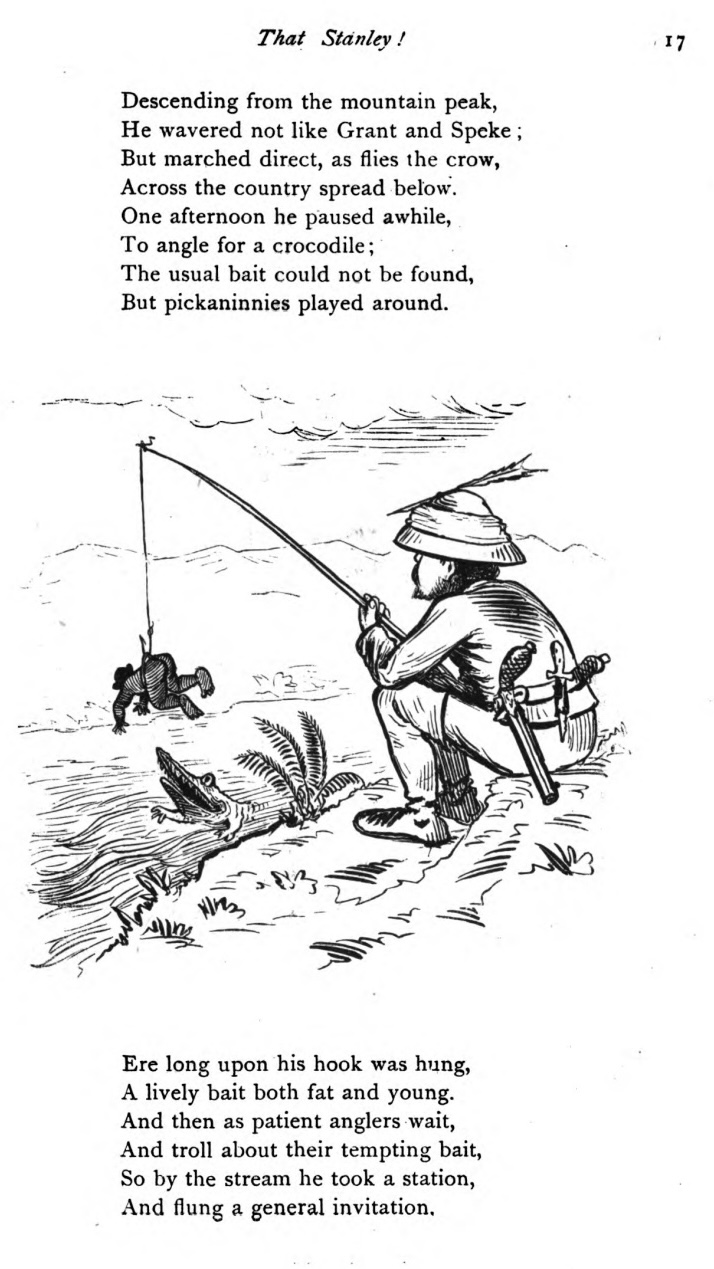
"The usual bait could not be found, But pickaninnies played around" (Palmer Cox, That Stanley!, 1878)

The alligator bait image is a subtype of the racist pickaninny caricature and stereotype of Black children, where they were represented as almost inhuman, filthy, unlovable, unkempt, "unsupervised and dispensable." In 19th and 20th century American popular media, stereotyped depictions of Black children were common:

[Black children in popular media had] wide toothy grins, rolling white eyes, shiny dark faces, and uncontrollably kinky hair ... Supportive props [included] watermelon, bales of cotton, and alligators ... The more vicious scenes devalued Black children's lives to the extent that entrepreneurs claimed they were 'dainty morsel,' 'free lunches' or 'gator bait' for carnivorous reptiles.

— Wilma King, African American Childhoods

Drawings of Black babies luring alligators were printed by companies like Underwood & Underwood on postcards, cigar boxes, and sheet music covers, The trope also appeared in films and in paintings. The sheet music drawings were almost purely symbolic; the images of Black children being hunted by alligators were not represented in almost any corresponding music, though other songs (without the iconography) did have alligator bait as a component. In general, the drawings reinforced the racist belief that Black people were victims to nature, and that their race made it reasonable to assume they should die terribly. Alligator-bait-themed postcards and greeting cards were part of a larger genre of anti-Black racist ephemera known as coon cards.

American Mutoscope and Biograph Company produced a pair of short films in 1900 called The 'Gator and the Pickaninny and Alligator Bait. In the former, "a black man with an ax unhesitatingly attacks an alligator that has swallowed a small black boy; as a result, the boy, Jonah-like, is restored." In the latter, according to the film-company catalog, "A little colored baby is tied to a post on a tropical shore. A huge 'gator comes out of the water, and is about to devour the little pickaninny, when a hunter appears and shoots the reptile." Due to the popularity of the idea, letter openers were manufactured in designs resembling alligators, some of which came equipped with small replicas of Black children's heads to be placed in the alligator's mouth.

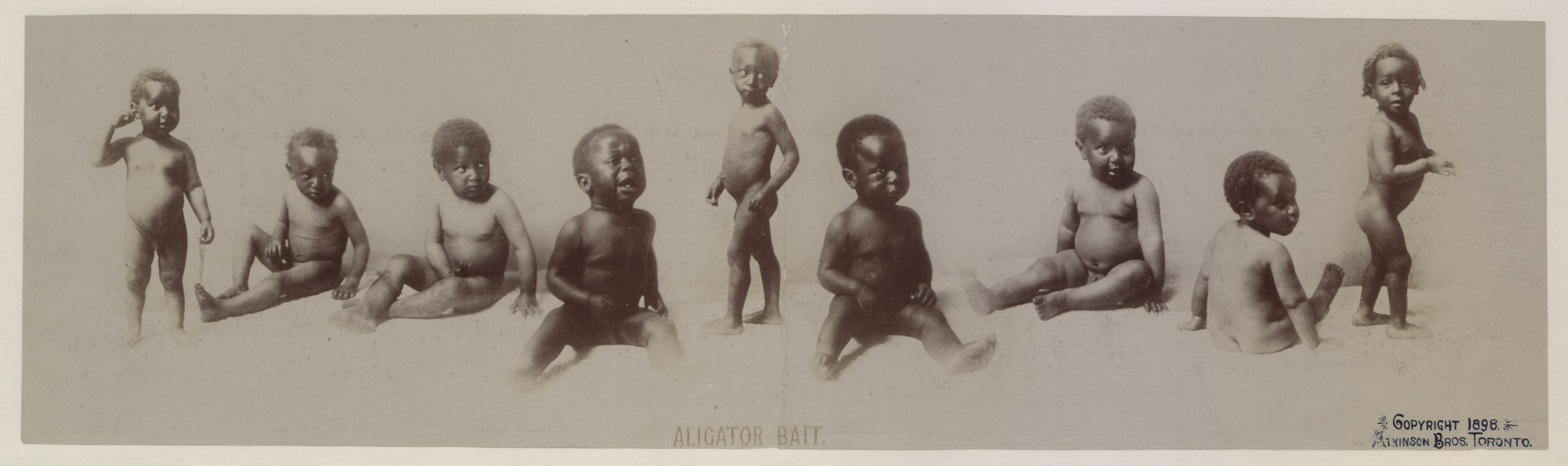
"Alligator Bait" photograph published by McCrary & Branson, 1897 (British Library)

The title "Alligator Bait" for an 1897 collage of nine African-American babies posed "on a sandy bayou" was supposedly suggested by a hardware-store employee in Knoxville, Tennessee as part of a naming contest with a cash prize. By 1900, the photo had sold 11,000 copies and brought in US$5,000 (equivalent to about $193,500 in 2025) for McCrary & Branson. In 1964, a New Jersey editorial writer recalled a copy of the photo—meant to "elicit an amused appreciation"—that had once hung in a local shop. The newspaper editor described the image as "immoral" and equivalent to "viciously pornographic pictures." American studies professor Jay Mechling concludes his essay (about how alligators are used in cultural messaging) on a similar note:

To discover the ways in which these symbols and stories carry anti-female and anti-black meanings is to see the ideology packed into our most taken-for-granted attitudes toward the world. Thinking anew about the symbolic alligator becomes a moral act, perhaps a moral duty, as we resist the power of the 'myths that think themselves in our minds.'

— Jay Mechling, American Wildlife in Symbol and Story

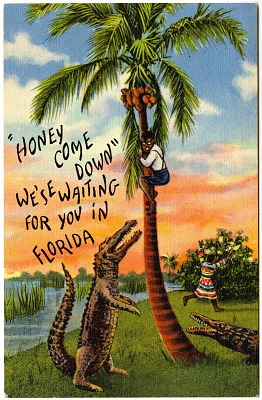
"Topics: Racism, ethnic wit and humor, 1898–1920" (National Museum of American History)

Adult Black men were presented in a similar manner as the babies: A 2003 Museum of Florida History exhibit called The Art of Hatred: Images of Intolerance in Florida Culture included postcards that "depict black people getting eaten by alligators as a joke. 'Free lunch in the Everglades, Florida' reads one." Such postcards were common well into the 1950s. The image of Black children being put in peril to lure alligators remains present in popular culture in the 21st century.

In her 1994 book Ceramic Uncles & Celluloid Mammies: Black Images and Their Influence on Culture, Patricia Turner, an African American studies professor who has researched the alligator bait cultural phenomenon, notes that stories of "alligator bait" are invariably narrated by whites, sometimes grouping "Negroes and dogs" together as similarly overawed with fear of alligators. There are no equivalent stories in 19th and 20th century Black folklore collections.

Turner argues that the repetitive, insistent "alligator bait" iconography of semi-naked or naked young children placed in danger of predation by large reptiles is not so much a stereotype or an urban legend as wishful thinking: "They implicitly advocate ... aggression in eliminating an unwanted people ... [T]he alligator is an accomplice in an effort to eradicate, or at least intimidate, the black." Mechling is more sexually explicit, arguing that white storytellers use the culturally constructed idea of "alligator-ness" in these images and stories to symbolically emasculate African American and Native American men alike. Claudia Slate, a professor of English at Florida Southern College, makes an analogy to the terroristic practice of lynching in the United States and argues that "containment of African Americans was a top priority for southern whites, and instilling fear, whether by actual ropes or imagined reptile attacks, served this purpose."

== Historicity debate ==
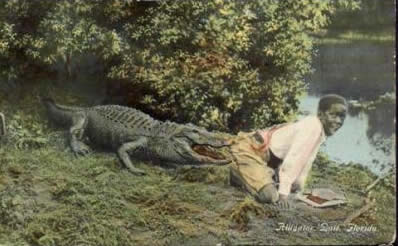
Alligator bait postcard, 1911

A number of accounts, published mostly between the 1880s and the 1920s, refer to the use of Black children as alligator bait as an apparently real practice. These include various newspaper and magazine articles as well as H. L. Mencken autobiography Happy Days, 1880–1892 (published 1940). Many of these accounts are short and fairly vague. While they are often interpreted as mere jokes and baseless rumors, Franklin Hughes of the Jim Crow Museum of Racist Memorabilia at Ferris State University in Michigan maintains that at least some of them likely refer to an actual, though not widespread, practice.

A detailed description of the process appeared in September 1923 in the Oakland Tribune. The article claimed that hunters in Florida rented Black babies from their mothers for $2. The baby was then placed in or near the water near an alligator's "haunt", with the hunter hidden behind a bush. When the alligator appeared to snatch the baby, it was shot by the hunter and the baby, wet but unharmed, was returned to the mother. The article asserted that this process was actually safe, as "Florida alligator hunters do not ever miss their targets". A number of follow-up articles likewise describing the alleged practice were published by other newspapers.

In 1919 the Florida Department of Agriculture and Florida State Live Stock Association explicitly discouraged any references to "alligators lying in wait for pickaninnies", describing them as harmful for the image of the state and against the commercial interests of its citizens. Hughes notes that while they condemned such depictions and references as an image problem, they made no comments on whether they might have reflected an actual practice. In the same period, some guidebook and newspapers published in Florida rejected the idea that anyone was intentionally using children for alligator hunting. A 1918 guidebook reassured potential tourists that "upon reliable authority [an alligator] will not attack a human, regardless of the fiction that pickaninnies are good alligator bait."

In 1919 a Fort Pierce, Florida, newspaper column complained, "Many years ago this serious error was perpetrated on Florida by an advertising agent of a railroad running through the South ... Florida's portion was [advertised with] pictures of moss hung swamps, rattlesnakes, alligators, and negro babies labelled 'alligator bait' ... this harmful psychology became very popular ... doubtless many foreigners believing that these babies were actually used for alligator bait." In 1926 a columnist for The Eustis Lake Region called it "a piece of Florida fiction going the rounds which ancient spinsters in snowbound lands delighted to repeat as truth. It gave them a feeling of virtuous superiority over the denizens of the pleasant land of Florida."

In May 2013, Hughes argued that due to the number of periodicals which mention the use of Black children as bait for alligators, it likely occurred, though it was not widespread or became a normal practice. Hughes essentially argues that since there was no discernible limit to the dehumanization and degradation of African Americans in the US national history, feeding children to animals for sport cannot be precluded as a possible reality. Four years later, Hughes argued again that it likely occurred, though he also found an article from Time magazine, contemporaneous to one alleged incident printed in newspapers, which denied that the practice ever occurred and that the report was a "silly lie, false and absurd".

In the 19th and early 20th century several stories were printed in American newspapers about the alleged practice. Academics have not assessed the authorship and likely veracity of these scattered news items, but a Snopes article from 2017 was unable to find any meaningful evidence that the practice occurred; Patricia Turner told Snopes it likely never did. The Snopes writer said it was impossible to prove a negative claim, and that no proponents of the historicity of the practice have met their burden of proof by providing any evidence of the practice, although the trope of Black children being the favorite food of alligators was already widespread in the antebellum United States. Jay Mechling's study of the American folklore of the alligator notes that "A common folk idea among whites is that alligators have a preference for blacks as a food source." For example, a 1850 article in Fraser's Magazine reported that alligators "prefer the flesh of a negro to any other delicacy". Per Mechling, the earliest instance of this lore is in a 1565 slave trader's account, and as late as the mid-20th century, in a story by Florida writer Marjorie Kinnan Rawlings, an alligator forgoes a group of naked white men for the opportunity to gorge itself on an individual Black man instead.

=== Use of bait in alligator hunting ===
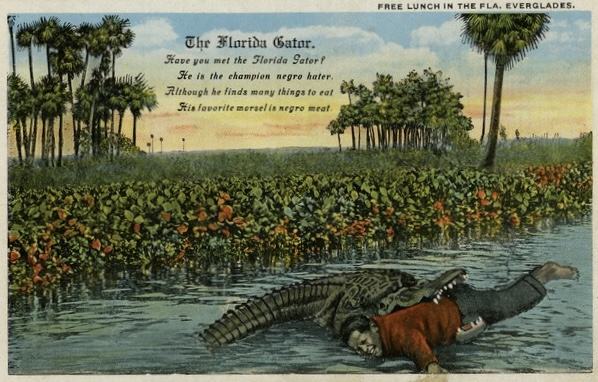
Have you met the Florida Gator? He is the champion negro hater; this postcard image and lyric first appeared in the 1930s (Florida International University Libraries)

In the Southeastern US, alligators were and are often hunted using small animals as bait, attached to a thick hook, hung approximately one foot above the water, and fastened to a tree by means of a chain or thick rope. Historically small living quadrupeds or birds were often used for this purpose; since the late 19th century, the use of dead bait – often nutria, chicken, or fish, frequently killed immediately before being put on the hook – has largely replaced it. Once the alligator has swallowed the bait, including hook and rope, it cannot get away, giving the hunter time to kill it. Regardless of whether the bait is dead or alive when put on the hook, it does not survive a successful hunt, since the alligator is killed only after seizing the bait. This hunting method is hard to reconcile with the idea that Black children used as "bait" usually survived the process unharmed, as the typical form of the trope claims. And while there are other well-documented hunting methods, they do not use live or dead bait.

Some forms of the trope suggest that when slavery was still legal in the Southern US, Black enslaved babies were indeed used as hooked live bait which the alligator was allowed to swallow before being killed, because the hunters had discovered that this type of bait would lure alligators better than any other and the profits from selling alligator skins were high enough to cover the cost of the babies.

An article published in the Miami New Times cites a Black history researcher who received a specific account of this practice from an inhabitant of Sanford, Florida, who had heard about it from his grandfather. As the grandfather told it, young children, from baby to toddler age, were taken from enslaved mothers and locked in pens until night time. Then the child was taken out, secured by "a rope around their neck and around their torso" and put over the water, with the child "screaming" and "chum[ming] the water", struggling to get free. This quickly lured alligators, one of whom would swallow the child, leaving "[no]thing but the rope" visible and allowing the hunters to kill the alligator stuck on the rope. Domonique Foxworth of Andscape considers this account as likely authentic, writing that the white hunters readily "trad[ed] one child's life for one alligator's skin", due to their belief "that blacks were an inferior race" and that Black lives were therefore "insignificant".

Turner notes that, though the idea that alligators preferred the flesh of Black children or adults over "any other delicacy" was indeed commonplace in the 19th century and sometimes reported "as a scientific fact", there is no solid evidence of it driving hunters to such murderous acts. Moreover, they would not have made economic sense, since a slave baby was "a much more valuable commodity than an alligator".

== Use as slur ==
In American slang, alligator bait (or 'gator bait) is a chiefly Southern slur aimed at Black people, particularly children; the term implies that the target is worthless and expendable. A variant use, albeit also expressing distaste, was alligator bait as World War II-era US military slang for prepared meals featuring chopped liver. The use of alligator bait to mean poor food (poor in senses of both flavor and socioeconomic class) had fallen out of use in the military by 1954.

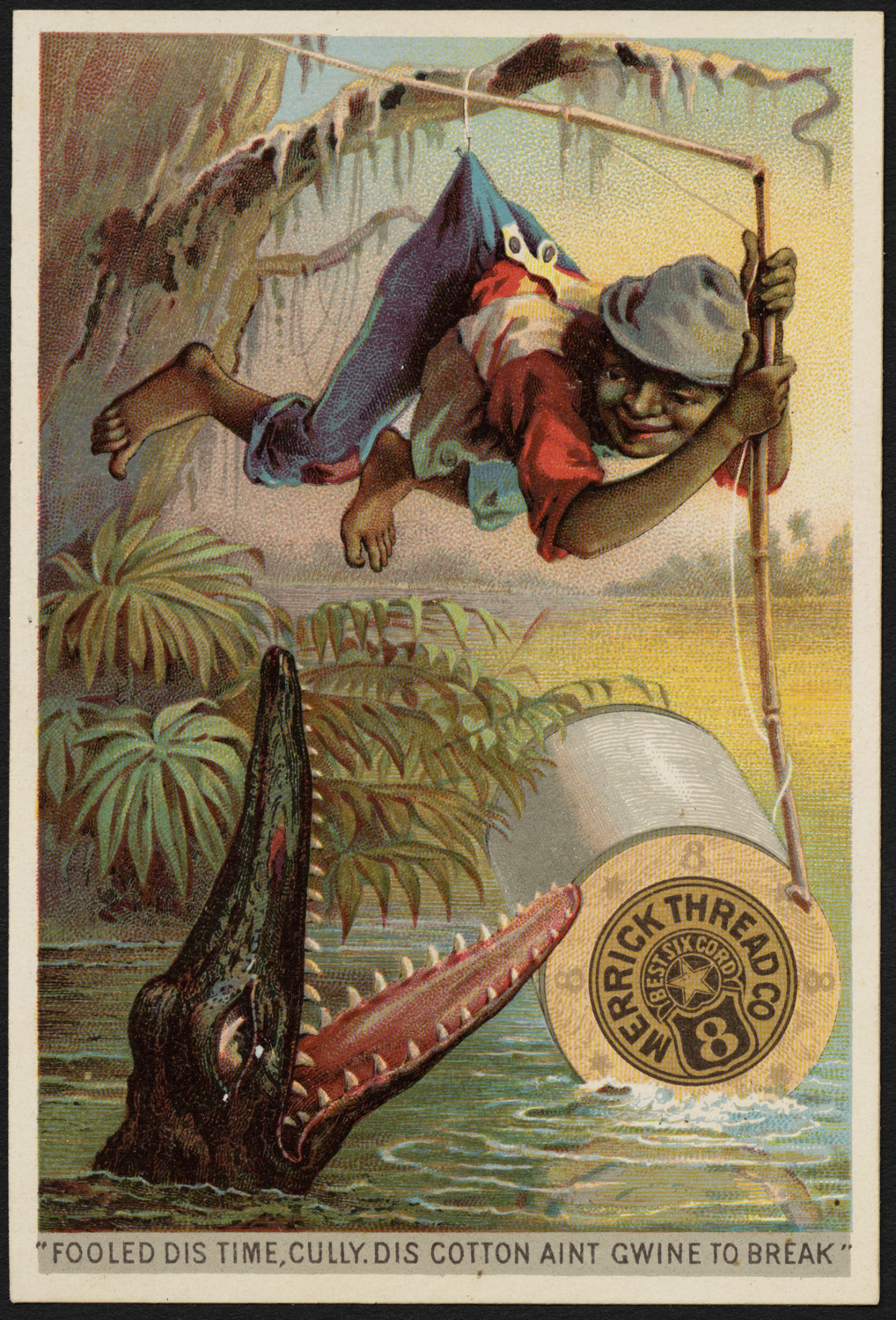
"Fooled dis time, Cully. Dis cotton aint gwine to break" (Merrick Thread Co. advertisement, late 1800s)

The derogatory use of alligator bait is likely pre–Civil War in origin. In 1905 a Vienna, Georgia, paper reported high cotton prices and wrote "The bench-legged pickaninny, once so attractive as alligator bait, is now tenderly nurtured and gets three 'squares' a day, for on him hangs the future hopes of big crops." In 1905 a postcard with no alligator imagery but picture of a crying Black baby was sent to one Delia with the message "this is great alligator bait." In 1923 the Moline, Illinois, sports page reported "The Plows used a wee hunk of alligator bait as bat boy yesterday, but the luck turned the other way. At any rate it must be admitted that the little fellow's presence added color." University of Florida fans were using the "uncomplimentary phrase" against Georgia Tech Yellow Jackets players in 1939.

Alligator bait appears in the lyrics of a 1940s swing-era jazz song called "Ugly Chile" (originally published 1917 as "Pretty Doll" by Clarence Williams). The song, which ends with a joke shared between performer and audience, is described as an "exorcism of an unacceptable fact" that is "funny and cogent in even the most unprivileged of readings". The version recorded by George Brunies goes:

Oh how I hate you
You alligator bait you
You knock-kneed, pigeon-toed, box-ankled too,
There's a curse on your family and a spell on you.

In 1968, Major League Baseball pitcher Bob Gibson recalled the slur being used against him while playing in Columbus, Georgia.

While playing for the Florida Gators in the 1990s, African-American football player Lawrence Wright popularized the phrase "If you ain't a Gator, you must be Gator Bait." In 2020, the University of Florida decided to end the "Gator Bait" chant during athletic events. According to university historian Carl Van Ness, the term had been used in connection with UF sports teams at least since the 1950s. While he found no direct connection between the chant and the racial slur, he argued that it was nevertheless impossible to disassociate the two.

== Similar accounts from other regions ==
In the late 19th and early 20th centuries, a number of Western newspapers claimed that Western hunters used local babies as bait for crocodiles in British Ceylon (today's Sri Lanka). Anslem de Silva and Ruchira Somaweera, the authors of a study on the topic, could not find independent evidence for this being an actual practice, nor could they conclusively refute the possibility. They note that better documented related practices include the use of living animals, such as puppies, to attract crocodiles, and that in documented cases hunters used their own bodies to lure animals such as pythons and catfish.

Between 1888 and 1890, five British and American newspapers published articles stating that in Ceylon "chubby" infants were rented by Western hunters to bait crocodiles, with the infants being afterwards returned unharmed to their parents. A similar story was published in another American newspaper in 1996. Some of these articles were accompanied by drawings of dark-skinned babies threatened by approaching crocodiles. More accounts appeared in seven American and Australian newspapers between late 1907 and 1911. They all cited a sailor who claimed to have shot a considerable number of crocodiles using this method — sometimes up to four in a single morning – renting babies from their Sinhalese mothers for a small fee because they were "the best bait".

All accounts of the supposed practice were published abroad, no records or folklore referring to it could be found in Sri Lanka itself. Due to the similarity of various of the published articles, de Silva and Somaweera consider it likely that a story reported first in one newspapers was later picked up by others, very slowing – over the course of years – making its round through the press. While they see no evidence that the practice could have been as "common or widespread" as some of the articles claim, they do not reach a conclusion on whether there may be truth in some of them or whether they were pure fabrications.

== Image gallery ==
Alligator bait
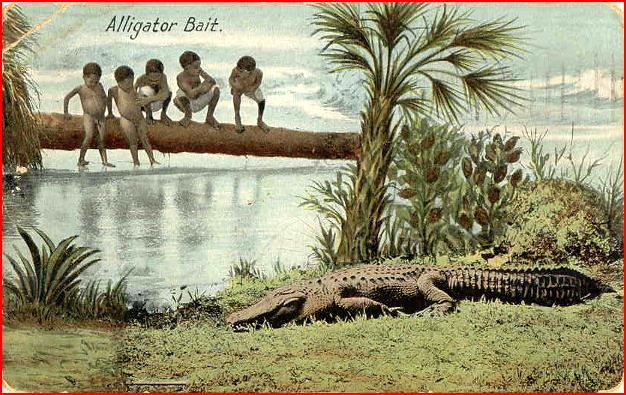
Alligator bait postcard from Quincy, Florida, 1909

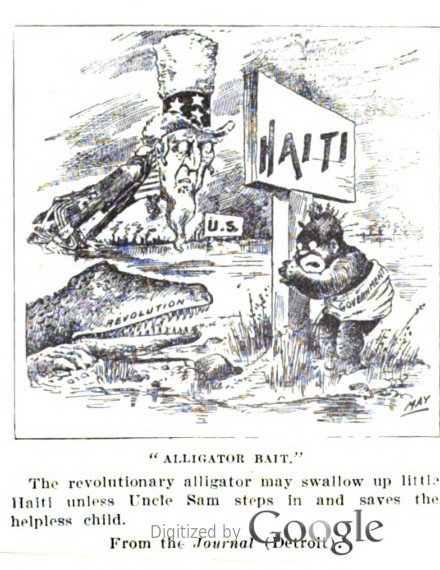
Editorial cartoon about political instability in Haiti (Cartoonist: May, Detroit Journal, reprinted in American Review of Reviews, Jan. 1909)

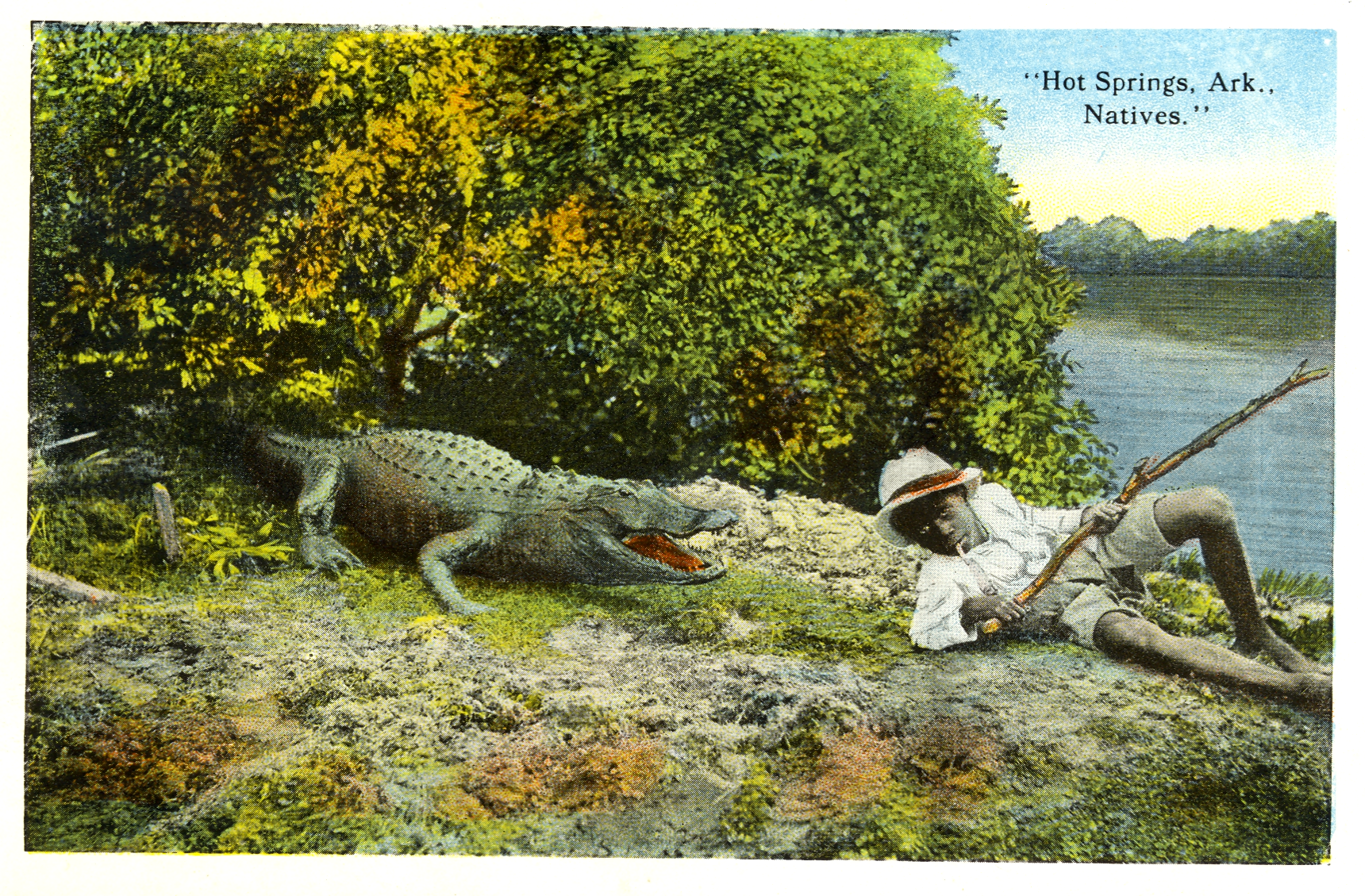
Fishing in Hot Springs - Boy and Alligator 1911

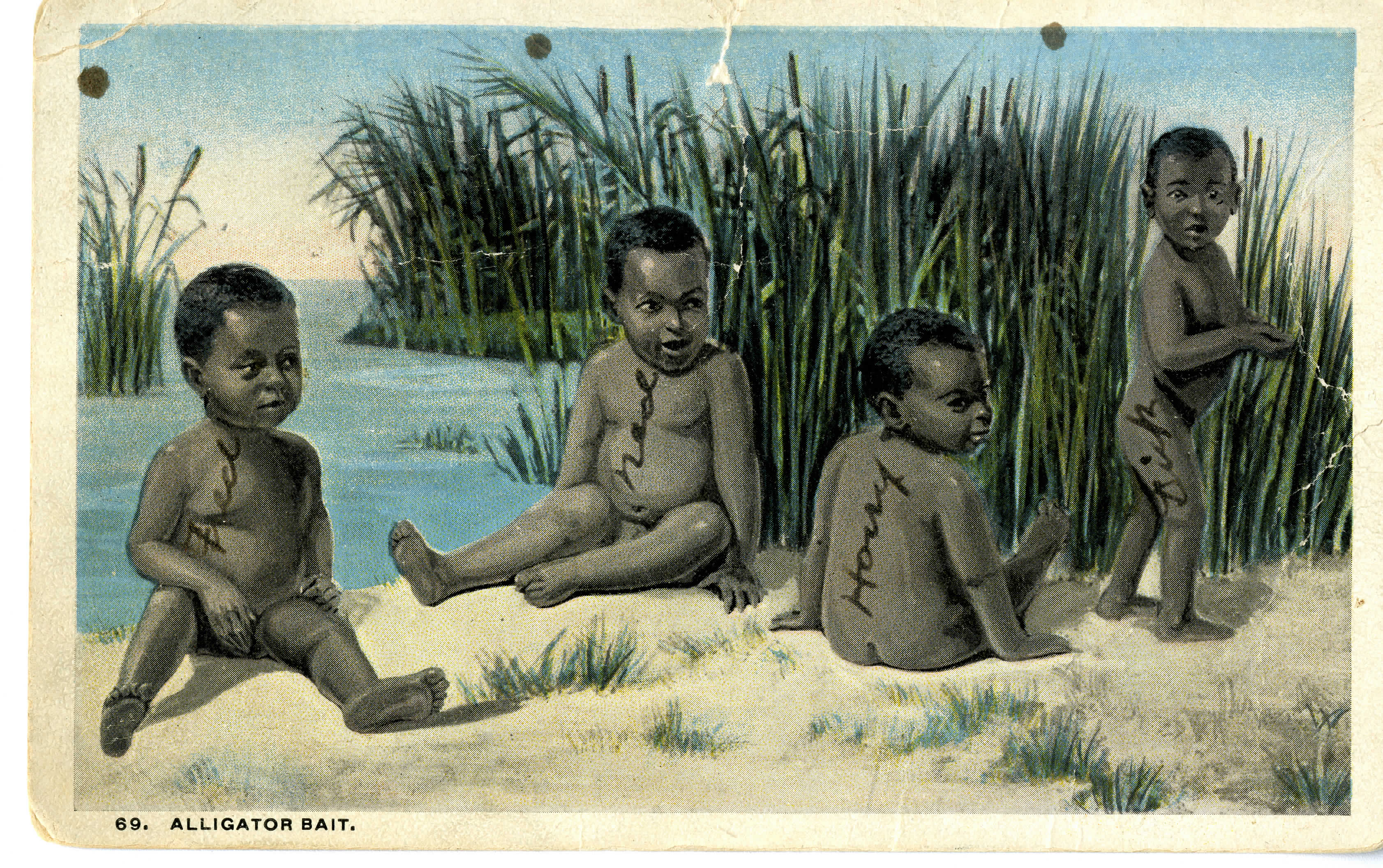
Later "alligator bait" postcards plagiarized the Knoxville lithograph (University of Southern Maine)

== See also ==
- Gator bait (disambiguation)
- Alligator wrestling § Native American historical origins
- Ethnic Notions – 1987 American documentary film
- Nadir of American race relations – Late 19th-/early 20th-century period of US history
- List of fatal alligator attacks in the United States

== Bibliography ==
=== References ===
- Adams, Hazard; Park, Bruce R. (1956). "The State of the Jazz Lyric". Chicago Review. 10 (3): 5–20. doi:10.2307/25293241. JSTOR 25293241.
- "Alligator Bait". The Journal of Blacks in Higher Education (24): 22. 1999. ISSN 1077-3711. JSTOR 2999048.
- "Alligator Bait (1900)". AFI Catalog of Feature Films: The First 100 Years 1893–1993. Los Angeles: American Film Institute. n.d. Archived from the original on March 8, 2023.
- Baldwin, Brooke (1988). "On the Verso: Postcard Messages as a Key to Popular Prejudices". The Journal of Popular Culture. 22 (3): 15–28. doi:10.1111/j.0022-3840.1988.2203_15.x.
- Calt, Stephen (October 1, 2010). Barrelhouse Words: A Blues Dialect Dictionary. University of Illinois Press. ISBN 978-0-252-09071-4.
- ""Coon Cards": Racist Postcards Have Become Collectors' Items". The Journal of Blacks in Higher Education (25): 72–73. Autumn 1999. doi:10.2307/2999393. ISSN 1077-3711. JSTOR 2999393. Archived from the original on March 8, 2023.
- Cox, Nicole C. (2010). "Selling seduction: Women and feminine nature in 1920s Florida advertising" (PDF). Florida Historical Quarterly. 89 (2): 186–209. ISSN 0015-4113. JSTOR 29765166. Archived from the original on December 14, 2022.
- Dean, Carolyn (2000). "Boys and girls and 'boys': Popular depictions of African-American children and childlike adults in the United States, 1850–1930". Journal of American and Comparative Cultures. 23 (3): 17–35. doi:10.1111/j.1537-4726.2000.2303_17.x. ISSN 1542-7331.
- de Silva, Anslem; Somaweera, Ruchira (January 26, 2015). "Were human babies used as bait in crocodile hunts in colonial Sri Lanka?" (PDF). Journal of Threatened Taxa. 7 (1): 6805–6809. doi:10.11609/jott.o4161.6805-9. ISSN 0974-7907. Archived from the original on December 14, 2022.
- Dickson, Paul (2014). War Slang: American Fighting Words & Phrases Since the Civil War (3rd ed.). Courier Corporation. p. 117. ISBN 978-0-486-79716-8.
- Dubin, Steven C. (1987). "Symbolic Slavery: Black Representations in Popular Culture". Social Problems. 34 (2): 122–140. doi:10.2307/800711. ISSN 0037-7791. JSTOR 800711.
- Emery, David (June 9, 2017). "Were black children used as alligator bait in the American South?". Snopes. Archived from the original on November 30, 2021.
- Finley, Cheryl (2019). "Photography and the archive". Critical Arts. 33 (6): 8–23. doi:10.1080/02560046.2019.1695868. ISSN 0256-0046. S2CID 219415308.
- Fulton, DoVeanna S. (2006). Speaking Power: Black Feminist Orality in Women's Narratives of Slavery. State University of New York Press. ISBN 978-0-7914-8231-5.
- "The 'Gator and the Pickanniny (1900)". AFI Catalog of Feature Films: The First 100 Years 1893–1993. Los Angeles: American Film Institute. n.d. Archived from the original on December 25, 2022.
- Glasgow, Vaughn (1991). A Social History of the American Alligator. New York: St. Martin's Press.
- Hatfield, Philip J. (2018). "A Collection of People: Migration, Settlement and Frontiers". Canada in the Frame: Copyright, Collections and the Image of Canada, 1895–1924. UCL Press. pp. 106–132. doi:10.2307/j.ctv3hvc7m.9. ISBN 978-1-78735-301-5. JSTOR j.ctv3hvc7m.9.
- Herbst, Philip (1997). The Color of Words: An Encyclopaedic Dictionary of Ethnic Bias in the United States. Yarmouth, Maine: Intercultural Press. p. 8. ISBN 978-1-877864-42-1 – via Internet Archive.
- Hinton, KaaVonia (2009). Sharon M. Draper: Embracing Literacy. Lanham, Md.: Scarecrow Press. ISBN 978-0-8108-5985-2.
- Hughes, Franklin (May 2013). "Alligator bait". Jim Crow Museum.
- Hughes, Franklin (June 2017). "Alligator bait revisited". Jim Crow Museum.
- King, Wilma (2005). "The Long Way from the Gold Dust Twins to the Williams Sisters: Images of African American Children in Selected Nineteenth- and Twentieth-Century Print Media". African American Childhoods. New York: Palgrave Macmillan. pp. 119–136. doi:10.1007/978-1-349-73165-7_8 (inactive July 11, 2025). ISBN 978-1-4039-6251-5 – via Internet Archive.
- Leab, Daniel J. (1973). "The Gamut from A to B: The Image of the Black in Pre-1915 Movies". Political Science Quarterly. 88 (1): 53–70. doi:10.2307/2148648. ISSN 0032-3195. JSTOR 2148648.
- Mechling, Jay (1987). "The Alligator". In Gillespie, Angus K.; Mechling, Jay (eds.). American Wildlife in Symbol and Story. Knoxville, Tenn.: University of Tennessee Press. pp. 73–98. ISBN 0-87049-522-4. OCLC 14165533 – via Internet Archive.
- Pearson, Erin (2021). "Consuming monsters: Hungry animals in the discourse on slavery". Arizona Quarterly. 77 (2): 25–53. doi:10.1353/arq.2021.0009. ISSN 0004-1610. S2CID 235717975.
- Slate, Claudia (2009). "Wish You Weren't Here: African American Portrayal in Vintage Florida Postcards". In Slate, Claudia; Van Camp, April (eds.). Florida Studies: Proceedings of the 2008 Annual General Meeting of the Florida College English Association. Newcastle upon Tyne: Cambridge Scholars Publishing. pp. 91–100. ISBN 978-1-4438-1171-2. OCLC 667048214. Archived from the original on March 9, 2023.
- Spears, Richard A. (1981). Slang and Euphemism: A Dictionary of Oaths, Curses, Insults, Sexual Slang and Metaphor, Racial Slurs, Drug Talk, Homosexual Lingo, and Related Matters. Middle Village, N.Y.: David Publishers. p. 7. ISBN 978-0-8246-0259-8 – via Internet Archive.
- Tuck, Eve (2009). "Suspending damage: A letter to communities" (PDF). Harvard Educational Review. 79 (3): 409–428. doi:10.17763/haer.79.3.n0016675661t3n15. ISSN 0017-8055 – via ResearchGate.
- Turner, Patricia A. (1994). "Alligator Bait". Ceramic Uncles & Celluloid Mammies: Black Images and Their Influence on Culture (1st ed.). New York: Anchor Books. pp. 31–40. ISBN 978-0-385-46784-1 – via Internet Archive.

=== Primary sources ===
- "Advertising Psychology". St. Lucie News Tribune. Port St. Lucie, Fla. November 28, 1919. p. 10. Archived from the original on February 27, 2023 – via Newspapers.com.
- "Alligator Bait". The Journal and Tribune. Knoxville, Tenn. November 25, 1900. p. 5. Archived from the original on February 27, 2023 – via Newspapers.com.
- "Alligator Bait". Editorial. The Madison Eagle. Madison, N.J. February 13, 1964. p. 4. Archived from the original on February 27, 2023 – via Newspapers.com.
- Anderson, Curley (July 11, 1923). "The Sports Spotlight". Moline Daily Dispatch. Moline, Ill. p. 13. Archived from the original on February 28, 2023 – via NewspaperArchive.com.
- Bradberry, Johnny (November 27, 1939). "Jacket Cripples Better, May Start Saturday". The Atlanta Constitution. p. 15. Archived from the original on January 17, 2023 – via Newspapers.com.
- Chapin, Dwight (July 5, 1968). "'Respect or Hypocrisy?' Bob Gibson: Black Man Nobody Wanted—Until He Was a Hero". Part III: Sports. Los Angeles Times. pp. III1, III10. Archived from the original on January 17, 2023 – via Newspapers.com.
- Hauserman, Julie (March 7, 2003). "No dogs, no blacks, no Jews'". Tampa Bay Times. Archived from the original on September 2, 2021.
- Moser, James Henry (April 2, 1900). "Branson, of Knoxville, an American Artist Who Really Enjoys His Obscurity". The Journal and Tribune. Knoxville, Tenn. p. 6. Archived from the original on February 26, 2023 – via Newspapers.com.
- "Interesting Letter on Cotton Crop". Vienna News. Vienna, Ga. December 15, 1905. p. 1. Archived from the original on February 28, 2023 – via NewspaperArchive.com.
- "Leaves From the Note-Book of a Naturalist, Part VII". Fraser's Magazine for Town and Country. Vol. 42. December 1850. p. 629. OCLC 5899443. Archived from the original on December 12, 2022 – via Google Books.
- "The Observer, For to Admire and to See—Kipling, Alligator Bait". The Eustis Lake Region. Vol. 45, no. 5. September 2, 1926. p. 2. Archived from the original on February 27, 2023 – via NewspaperArchive.com.
- Staples, Andy (June 18, 2020). "Staples: 'Gator Bait' and the collision of history we don't know with history we do". The Athletic. Archived from the original on November 20, 2021.
- Van Ness, Carl (June 27, 2020). "Here's what UF's historian says about the 'Gator Bait' history and controversy". Opinion. Tampa Bay Times. Archived from the original on September 2, 2022.
- Wallrich, Bill (September 1954). "Where the Air Force Gets Its Slang". Air Force: The Magazine of American Air Power. Vol. 37, no. 9. Air Force Association. pp. 118–126. Archived from the original on February 28, 2023 – via Google Books.
- Winter, Nevin O. (1918). Florida, the Land of Enchantment. "See America First" series. Boston, Mass.: The Page Company. p. 310. LCCN 18002916. OCLC 1511192. Archived from the original on February 27, 2023 – via HathiTrust.
