= Carlyn =

Carlyn is an English feminine given name and surname. As a given name it is form of Caroline derived from Karl. As an English surname it derives from the Irish surnames O'Carlain and O'Caireallain. Notable people with this name include the following:

Carlyn may refer to:

- Carlyn Chisholm, Baroness Chisholm of Owlpen
- Carlyn Kruger, Canadian former alpine skier who competed in the 1956 Winter Olympics
- Carlyn Ocampo, former member of Filipino pop group Pop Girls and currently member of Korean girl group Z-Girls

== See also ==
- Carlin (name)
- Carolyn
- Carlyne
