= Hide (skin) =

Animal skin treated for human use

A hide or skin is an animal skin treated for human use. The word "hide" is related to the Dutch word huid and the German word Haut, which mean skin. The industry defines hides as "skins" of large animals e.g. cow, buffalo; while skins refer to "skins" of smaller animals: goat, sheep, deer, pig, fish, alligator, snake, etc. Common commercial hides include leather from cattle and other livestock animals, buckskin, alligator skin and snake skin. All are used for shoes, clothes, leather bags, belts, or other fashion accessories. Leather is also used in cars, upholstery, interior decorating, horse tack and harnesses. Skins are sometimes still gathered from hunting and processed at a domestic or artisanal level but most leather making is now industrialized and large-scale. Various tannins are used for this purpose. Hides are also used as processed chews for dogs or other pets.

The term "skin" is sometimes expanded to include furs, which are harvested from various species, including cats, mustelids, and bears.

== History ==
Archaeologists believe that animal hides provided an important source of clothing and shelter for numerous prehistoric humans. Hide use continues into modern times, where it remains especially important outside industrialized societies.

The Inuit, for example, traditionally use animal hides for summer tents, waterproof clothes, and kayaks. In early medieval Europe, hides were used to protect wooden castles and defend buildings from setting alight during a siege. Various American Indian tribes have extensively used hides in the construction of tepees and wigwams, moccasins, and buckskins. They were sometimes used as window coverings. Until the invention of plastic drum heads in the 1950s, animal hides or metal were usually used.

Parchment and vellum—a kind of paper made from processed skins—was introduced to the Eastern Mediterranean during the Iron Age, supposedly at Pergamon.

The Assize of Weights and Measures—one of the statutes of uncertain date from c. 1300—mentions rawhide, gloves, parchment, and vellum among the principal items of England's commerce. A standardized shipload of leather (a last) consisted of 20 dicker of 10 cowhides. Rabbit and squirrel skins were traded and taxed in timbers of 40 hides each. Skins were also traded in binds of 32 or 33 skins each, while gloves were sold in dickers of 10 pair and dozens of 12 pair. The parchment and vellum was traded based on dozens of the original sheepskins from which they were prepared.

Rare furs have been a notable status symbol throughout history. Ermine fur is particularly associated with European nobility, with the black-tipped tails arranged around the edges of the robes to produce a pattern of black diamonds on a white field. Demand for beaver hats in the 17th and 18th century drove some of the initial exploration and colonization of North America, particularly in what is now Canada. High fur demand led to over-hunting of species like sea otters and even prompted wars among native tribes competing for the most productive areas. Natural leather continues to be used for many expensive products from limousine upholstery to designer cellular phone cases. There are, however, many forms of artificial leather and fur now available, which are usually cheaper alternatives.

== Production ==
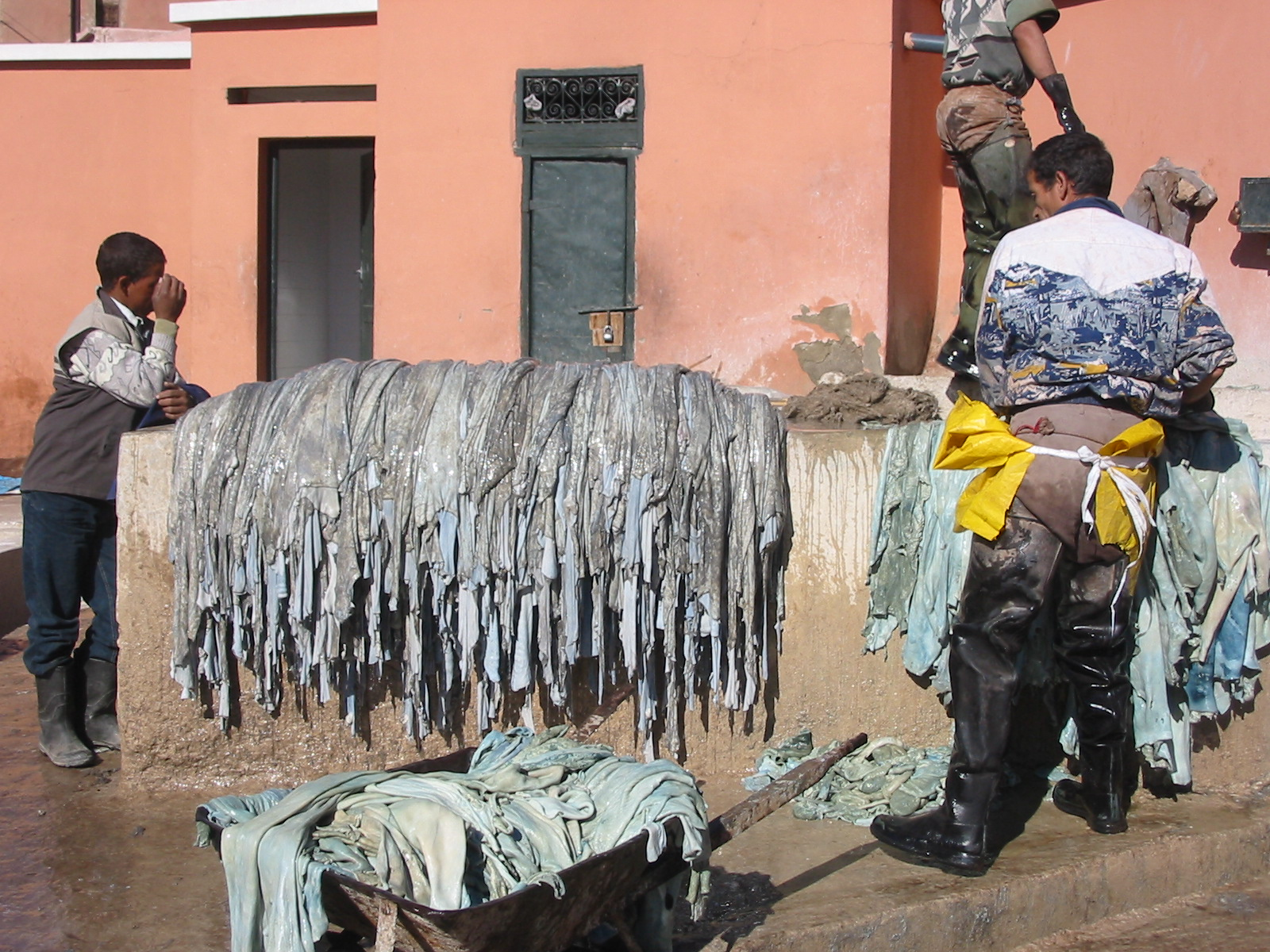
Fresh tanned leather

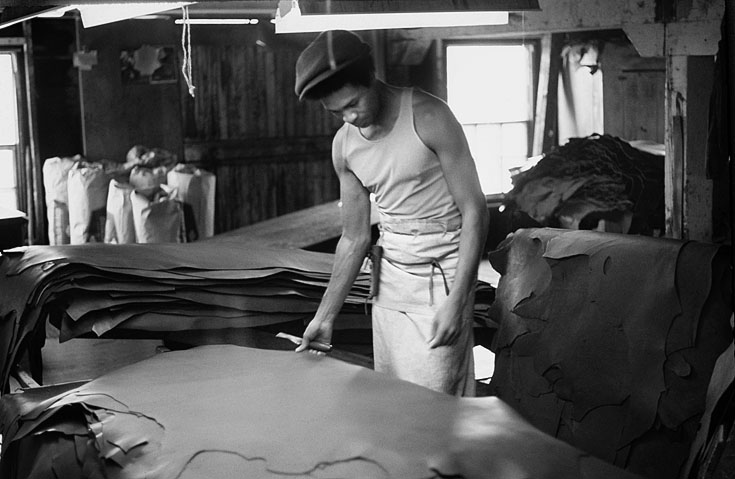
Finishgrading leather

Animal hides and skins are usually processed fresh or salted and tanned. Skins sometimes are stretched, dried, and tanned. Most hides are processed from domesticated animals; the most common wild animals used for fur—mink and rabbit—are similarly raised in captivity and farmed. Some others—including lynx and wolves—are still trapped in the wild for their fur.

== Use ==
Currently, hides are mainly used for footwear, upholstery, leather goods; skins are used for clothing, particularly as coats, gloves, leather goods and footwear. It is also used for bookbinding.

Many traditional drums, especially hand drums like the pandeiro, continue to be made using natural skins. The alligator drum was formerly important in Chinese music. The Chinese sanxian and Okinawan sanshin are usually prepared from snakeskin, while their Japanese equivalent, the shamisen, is made from dogskin in the case of students and catskin in the case of professional players. The African-American banjo was originally made from skins but is now often synthetic. "Hides" is used as a slang term to refer to a drumset.

Kangaroo leather is the most common material for the construction of bullwhips. Stingray rawhide is a common material for the grips of Chinese, Japanese, and Scottish swords.

Pig skins are processed as pork rinds. Hides can also be used as chew toys for pets.

Rabbit fur is popular for hats, coats, and glove linings.

== Controversy ==
Animal rights activists generally protest the use of animal hides for human clothing. Forms of protest range from PETA's "I would rather go naked than wear fur" campaign, although more shocking and direct action, like damaging furs with red paint in imitation of blood, has been toned down, like the "Ink, not Mink" campaign. Roadblocking and break-ins against meat/fur/leather industry is also used and extends to personal campaigns against such companies and also hunters which have included arson and assault in some cases.

== See also ==
- Alligator hunting
- Bating (leather)
- Buckskin (usually from deer)
- Calfskin
- Caribou
- Crocodile farming
- Deerskin
- Fish leather
- Goatskin
- Leather
- Ostrich leather
- Rawhide (usually from cattle)
- Snakeskin
- Taxidermy
