= Carolyne =

Carolyne is a Swedish feminine given name that is an alternate form of Caroline as well as a diminutive form of Carola. Notable people referred to by this name include the following:

== Given name ==
- Carolyne Barry (1943–2015), American dancer and dance instructor
- Carolyne Bernard (born 1994), Tanzanian beauty queen
- Carolyne Christie (born 1946), English aristocrat
- Carolyne Larrington (born 1959), British literature scholar and author.
- Carolyne Lepage (born 1975), Canadian judoka
- Carolyne Mas (born 1955), American singer-songwriter and record producer
- Carolyne Mazzo (born 1997), Brazilian swimmer
- Carolyne Morrison (1905–1997), Canadian politician
- Carolyne Oughton (born 1952), Canadian former alpine skier
- Carolyne Pedro (born 2000), Brazilian artistic gymnast
- Carolyne Roehm (born 1951), American author, businesswoman, socialite, and former fashion designer
- Carolyne Underwood (born 1982), British television personality
- Carolyne M. Van Vliet, Dutch-born American physicist
- Carolyne Wright, American poet
- Carolyne zu Sayn-Wittgenstein (1819–1887), Polish noblewoman

== See also ==
- Carlyne
- Caroline (name)
- Carolyn
- Carolynn
- Carolynne
- Károlyné Honfi
