= Richard T. Morrison =

American judge (born 1967)

Richard Morrison

Senior Judge of the United States Tax Court
- Incumbent
- Assumed office August 28, 2023

Judge of the United States Tax Court
- In office August 29, 2008 – August 28, 2023
- Appointed by: George W. Bush
- Preceded by: Carolyn Miller Parr
- Succeeded by: Benjamin A. Guider III

Personal details
- Born: Richard Thane Morrison; June 10, 1967 (age 58) Hutchinson, Kansas, U.S.
- Education: University of Kansas (BA, BS); University of Chicago (JD, MA)

Richard Thane Morrison (born June 10, 1967) is a senior judge of the United States Tax Court.

Born in Kansas, Morrison received a Bachelor of Arts and a Bachelor of Science from the University of Kansas in 1989 and was a visiting student at Mansfield College, Oxford University from 1987 to 1988. He received a J.D. from the University of Chicago Law School, 1993 and a Master of Arts from the University of Chicago in 1994. He was a law clerk to Judge Jerry Edwin Smith, United States Court of Appeals for the Fifth Circuit from 1993 to 1994, and was then an associate with Baker & McKenzie in Chicago until 1996, and with Mayer Brown & Platt, also in Chicago, until 2001.

Morrison then entered government service, working as a Deputy Assistant Attorney General for Review and Appellate Matters in the Tax Division of the United States Department of Justice, from September 2001 to August 2008 (except for term as Acting Assistant Attorney General, from July 2007 to January 2008). Nominated by President George W. Bush as Judge, United States Tax Court, on November 15, 2007, Morrison was confirmed by Senate, July 7, 2008. Following confirmation he was then appointed by President George W. Bush as a Judge of United States Tax Court, on August 28, 2008, for a term ending August 27, 2023.

== Attribution ==
Material on this page was copied from the website of the United States Tax Court, which is published by a United States government agency, and is therefore in the public domain.

Legal offices
Preceded by Carolyn Miller Parr	Judge of the United States Tax Court; 2008–2023	Succeeded by Benjamin A. Guider III
