= Carbyne (disambiguation) =

Carbyne (R-C⫶) is a class of chemical compounds with three dangling bonds on a carbon atom.

Carbyne may also refer to:

- The methylidyne radical (⫶CH), the parent member and namesake of the carbyne family
- Linear acetylenic carbon (C≡C−)_{n}, a form of carbon with chains of alternating single and triple bounds
- A polyyne, a molecule with such a chain in its molecular structure
- Carbyne (company), an Israeli technology company

== See also ==
- Carlyne
