= Gator bait =

Gator bait may refer to:

- Alligator bait, ethnic slur for African-Americans
- 'Gator Bait, 1974 action thriller film
- Gator Bait, airboat ride at Six Flags New Orleans
- "Gator Bait", cheer heard at University of Florida sporting events
