= Carolanne =

Carolanne is a feminine given name that is a version of the name Caroline. Notable people known by this name include the following:

- Carolanne Marie Carawan, full name of Candie Carawan (born 1939), American civil rights activist, singer and author
- Carolanne D'Astous-Paquet (born 1990), Québécoise singer
- Carolanne Pegg, an alternate name of Carole Pegg, British folksinger and violinist, and ethnomusicologist

== See also ==
- Carolane Soucisse
- Carolann
- Carolynne
