= Carolyn Gates =

Veterinary epidemiologist

- Awards: Massey University Early Career Research Medal, Prime Minister’s Educator of the Year Award

Academic background
- Education: University of Pennsylvania, University of Edinburgh
- Thesis: Controlling endemic disease in cattle populations: current challenges and future opportunities (2014)
- Doctoral advisor: Mark Woolhouse

Maureen Carolyn Gates is an American–New Zealand academic veterinarian, and is a full professor at Massey University. She specialises in evidence-based solutions for animal health problems, and has been recognised for developing innovative teaching methods.

== Academic career ==
Before entering private practice, Gates completed her undergraduate veterinary degree at the University of Pennsylvania. Gates then completed a PhD titled Controlling endemic disease in cattle populations: current challenges and future opportunities at the University of Edinburgh in 2014, supervised by Mark Woolhouse. Gates worked in veterinary surveillance at Texas A&M University, and joined the faculty of Massey University in 2015 as a lecturer, rising to full professor in 2023.

Gates is interested in researching evidence-based solutions to animal problems. She has worked on the surveillance and eradication of bovine viral diarrhoea virus, for which she conducted a nationwide survey. She has also co-developed a platform for sharing information about backyard poultry, and has commented on the threat that foot-and-mouth disease poses to New Zealand production. Gates has also been recognised for her teaching, having developed blended learning and peer learning approaches for clinical education for veterinary students.

== Honours and awards ==
Gates was awarded the 2018 Massey University Early Career Research Medal, and the International Society for Veterinary Epidemiology and Economics Emerging Scientist Award. She also won the 2022 Prime Minister's Educator of the Year Award, awarded by Ako Aotearoa.

== Selected works ==
- Gates, Carolyn Maureen; Nolan, Thomas (2009). "Endoparasite prevalence and recurrence across different age groups of dogs and cats". Veterinary Parasitology. 166 (1–2): 153–158. doi:10.1016/j.vetpar.2009.07.041. PMC 2783654. PMID 19709815. Wikidata Q42673024.
- Caitlin Alexandra Evans; Beate Pinior; Larska, Magdalena; David Graham; Matthias Schweizer; Christian Guidarini; Nicola Decaro; Julia Ridpath; Gates, Carolyn Maureen (2018). "Global knowledge gaps in the prevention and control of bovine viral diarrhoea (BVD) virus". Transboundary and Emerging Diseases. 66 (2): 640–652. doi:10.1111/tbed.13068. PMID 30415496. Wikidata Q58554860.
- Gates, Carolyn Maureen; Mark Woolhouse (2015). "Controlling infectious disease through the targeted manipulation of contact network structure". Epidemics: the journal of infectious disease dynamics. 12: 11–19. doi:10.1016/j.epidem.2015.02.008. PMC 4728197. PMID 26342238. Wikidata Q36506236.
- Gates, Carolyn Maureen; M E J Woolhouse; G J Gunn; R W Humphry (2013). "Relative associations of cattle movements, local spread, and biosecurity with bovine viral diarrhoea virus (BVDV) seropositivity in beef and dairy herds". Preventive Veterinary Medicine. 112 (3–4): 285–295. doi:10.1016/j.prevetmed.2013.07.017. PMID 24012354. Wikidata Q42271603.
- Gates, Carolyn Maureen; Nolan, Thomas (2009). "Factors influencing heartworm, flea, and tick preventative use in patients presenting to a veterinary teaching hospital". Preventive Veterinary Medicine. 93 (2–3): 193–200. doi:10.1016/j.prevetmed.2009.10.012. PMC 2815201. PMID 19931925. Wikidata Q33625646.
- Gates, Carolyn Maureen; Roger W. Humphry; George J. Gunn; Mark E. J. Woolhouse (2014). "Not all cows are epidemiologically equal: quantifying the risks of bovine viral diarrhoea virus (BVDV) transmission through cattle movements". Veterinary Research. 45: 110. doi:10.1186/preaccept-1387776792126309. PMC 4206702. PMID 25323831. Wikidata Q34389638.
- Gates, Carolyn Maureen; J Walker; S Zito; A Dale (2019). "Cross-sectional survey of pet ownership, veterinary service utilisation, and pet-related expenditures in New Zealand". New Zealand Veterinary Journal. 67 (6): 306–314. doi:10.1080/00480169.2019.1645626. PMID 31319781. Wikidata Q91996330.
