= Carolynn =

Carolynn is a given name that is an alternate spelling of Carol, a derivative of Caroline and a variation of Carolyn. Notable people known by this name include the following:

- Carolynn Marie Hill, known as Lynn Hill (born 1961), American rock climber
- Carolynn Jackson, co-founder of Spec's Wine, Spirits & Finer Foods
- Carolynn Reid-Wallace (born 1942), American academic administrator
- Carolynn Sells (born 1973), British motorcycle racer,
- Mary Carolynn Tucker, full name of Mary Tucker (born 2001), American sports shooter

== See also ==
- Carolann
- Carolyn
- Carolyne
- Carolynne
