= Carolyn Miller Parr =

American judge (born 1937)

Carolyn Parr

Senior Judge of the United States Tax Court
- In office January 1, 2001 – April 2002

Judge of the United States Tax Court
- In office November 25, 1985 – January 1, 2001
- Appointed by: Ronald Reagan
- Preceded by: William M. Fay
- Succeeded by: Richard T. Morrison

Personal details
- Born: Carolyn Miller; April 17, 1937 (age 88); Palatka, Florida, U.S.
- Spouse: Jerry Parr
- Education: Stetson University (BA); Vanderbilt University (MA); Georgetown University (JD)

Carolyn Miller Parr (born April 17, 1937) was a judge of the United States Tax Court from 1985 to 2002.

== Early life, education, and career ==
Born in Palatka, Florida, to Arthur C. and Audrey Dunklin Miller, Parr received a B.A. in English from Stetson University in 1959, followed by an M.A. in English from Vanderbilt University in 1960, and a J.D. from the Georgetown University Law Center in 1977.

Parr served as senior trial attorney for the Internal Revenue Service from 1977 to 1982, and as special counsel to the Assistant Attorney General, and Acting Chief, Office of Special Litigation in the Tax Division of the United States Department of Justice from 1982 to 1985. In 1982, she was also chair of the Board of Directors of Heritage Christian Church.

== Judicial career and later life ==
In 1985, Parr was nominated by President Ronald Reagan to a 15-year term in a seat on the Tax Court vacated by the retirement of William M. Fay, and took her oath of office on November 25, 1985. While serving on the court in 1997, she ruled that the estate of former Tennessee Governor Ray Blanton was required to pay income taxes on tens of thousands of dollars of kickbacks received by the governor.

Following her service on the Tax Court, Parr co-founded a mediation and arbitration firm called "Beyond Disputes Associates".

== Personal life ==
Parr married Jerry Parr in 1959, with whom she had three daughters, Kimberly, Jennifer, and Trish. Jerry Parr served as a United States Secret Service agent, and became famous for saving President Ronald Reagan from an assassination attempt in 1981; Jerry and Carolyn Parr co-authored his memoir, In the Secret Service: The True Story Of The Man who Saved President Reagan. Jerry Parr died of congestive heart failure at a hospice in Washington, D.C., on October 9, 2015, aged 85, survived by his wife of nearly 56 years.

Legal offices
Preceded by William M. Fay	Judge of the United States Tax Court; 1985–2001	Succeeded by Richard T. Morrison
