= Francisca Mutapi =

Medical researcher

- Born: Zimbabwe
- Occupations: Professor in Global Health Infection and Immunity
- Spouse: Mark Woolhouse

Academic background
- Education: University of Zimbabwe; University of Oxford

Academic work
- Discipline: Parasitology; Immunology
- Institutions: University of Edinburgh

Francisca Mutapi is a professor in global health infection and immunity, co-director of the Global Health Academy at the University of Edinburgh, and deputy director of the National Institute for Health Research (NIHR) Global Health Research Unit Tackling Infections to Benefit Africa. She is the first black woman known to have been awarded a professorship by the University of Edinburgh.

== Early life and education ==
Mutapi was born in and grew up in Zimbabwe. She gained her undergraduate degree in Biological Sciences in 1991 from the University of Zimbabwe, winning the BSc programs student award and the best BSc Honours student award in Biological Sciences. She gained a DPhil in Biological Sciences at the University of Oxford, as a Beit Trust Scholar. She is an alumna of Linacre College, Oxford.

== Career ==
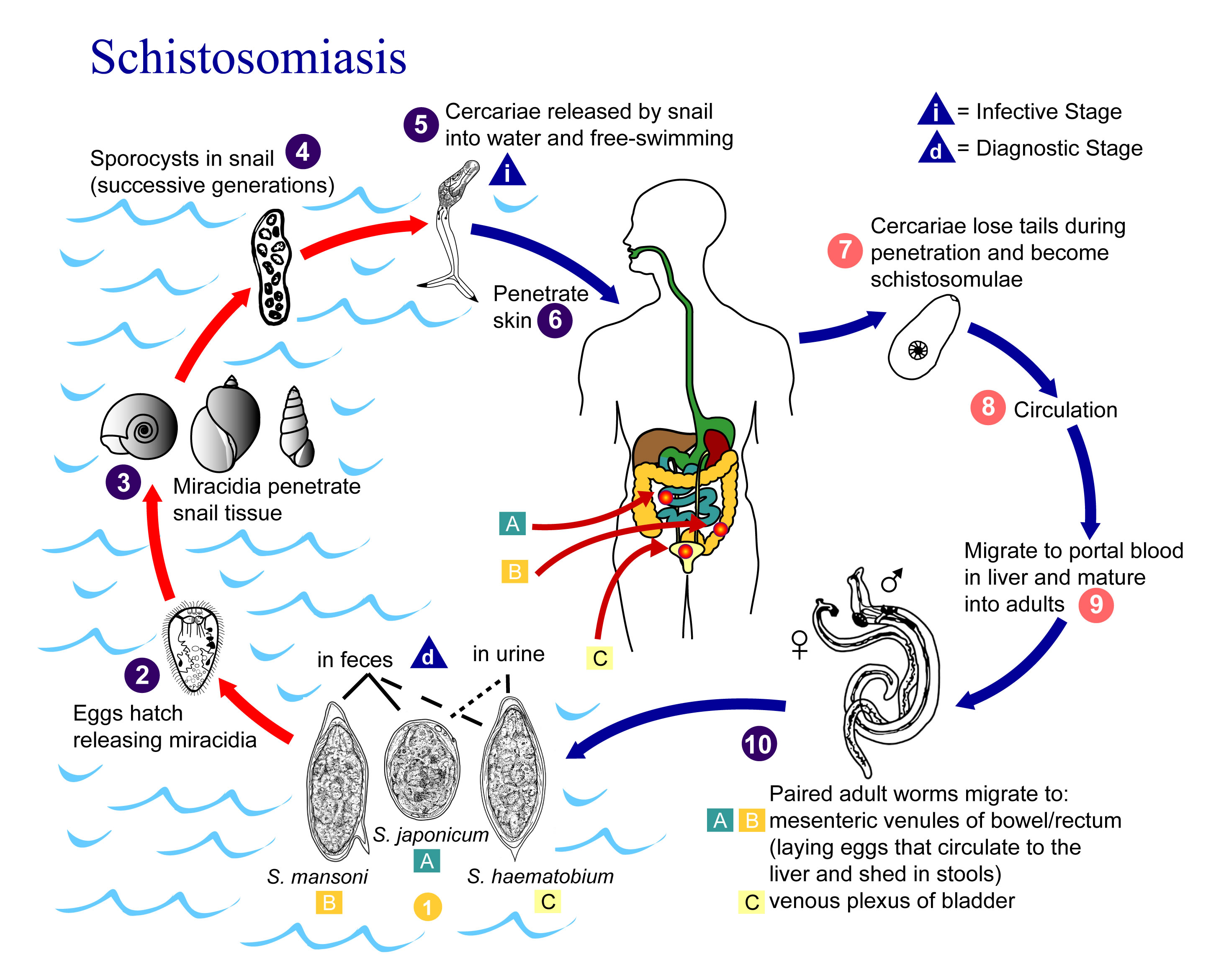
The life cycle of bilharzia (Schistosomiasis)

After completing her PhD, Mutapi undertook postdoctoral training at the Institute of Tropical Medicine Antwerp from 1997 to 1999. She went on to lectureships at St Hilda's College, Oxford and in the Department of Zoology, University of Oxford. She has also worked in the Department of Microbiology at Birkbeck College and the Department of Clinical Veterinary Studies at the University of Glasgow.

In 2002, Mutapi joined the University of Edinburgh on a Medical Research Council Training Fellowship. As Reader in the School of Biological Sciences at the University of Edinburgh, Mutapi's research was in global health and tropical diseases, specialising particularly in the study of schistosomiasis/bilharzia, a disease caused by a parasitic worm that develops in snails. Her work contributed to the prioritisation of bilharzia as a public health concern by the World Health Organisation (WHO) and pharmaceutical company Merck KgaA.

In 2012, Mutapi was one of the founding members of the Royal Society of Edinburgh's Young Academy. She was elected a Fellow of the African Academy of Sciences in 2015 and is a Fellow of the Zimbabwe Academy of Sciences.

Mutapi is currently professor in global health infection and immunity, and she is co-director of the Global Health Academy at the University of Edinburgh. Mutapi is also Deputy Director of the NIHR Global Health Research Unit TIBA (Tackling Infections to Benefit Africa), which takes a holistic approach to implementing research into evidence-based policies in African countries, taking into account science, technological challenges, and socioeconomics.

In 2018, Mutapi was awarded the University of Edinburgh's Chancellor's Award for Impact in recognition of her work on the treatment for bilharzia. The next year Mutapi was made a member of the advisory board for the UK Global Challenges Research Fund.

In addition to her scientific work, Mutapi is a painter, using funds from her work to support education in Zimbabwe.

== Research ==
Mutapi's lab at the University of Edinburgh, the Parasite Immuno-epidemiology Group, researches immune responses to helminths within individuals and across populations primarily in Africa.

Additionally her research has a focus on developing a formulation of praziquantel, the only drug effective against schistosomiasis infection, for children. Currently the drug is a large pill which children in high-risk areas struggle and are often reluctant to take.

Currently there are no available vaccines for infections by helminth worms including bilharzia. Mutapi is pioneering proteomics approaches to develop new vaccine candidates for these parasites. This involves the use of mass spectrometry to find parasite antigens (proteins which activate an adaptive immune response) which are ingredients for effective vaccines.

In poorer regions of Africa coinfection by multiple different pathogens is a common occurrence. Mutapi has pioneered research into many examples of this, such as malaria and schistosomiasis coinfections, and infections by multiple different malaria species.

== Personal life ==
Mutapi is married to Mark Woolhouse, professor of infectious disease epidemiology. Together they have a daughter.
