= Benjamin A. Guider III =

American judge

Ben Guider
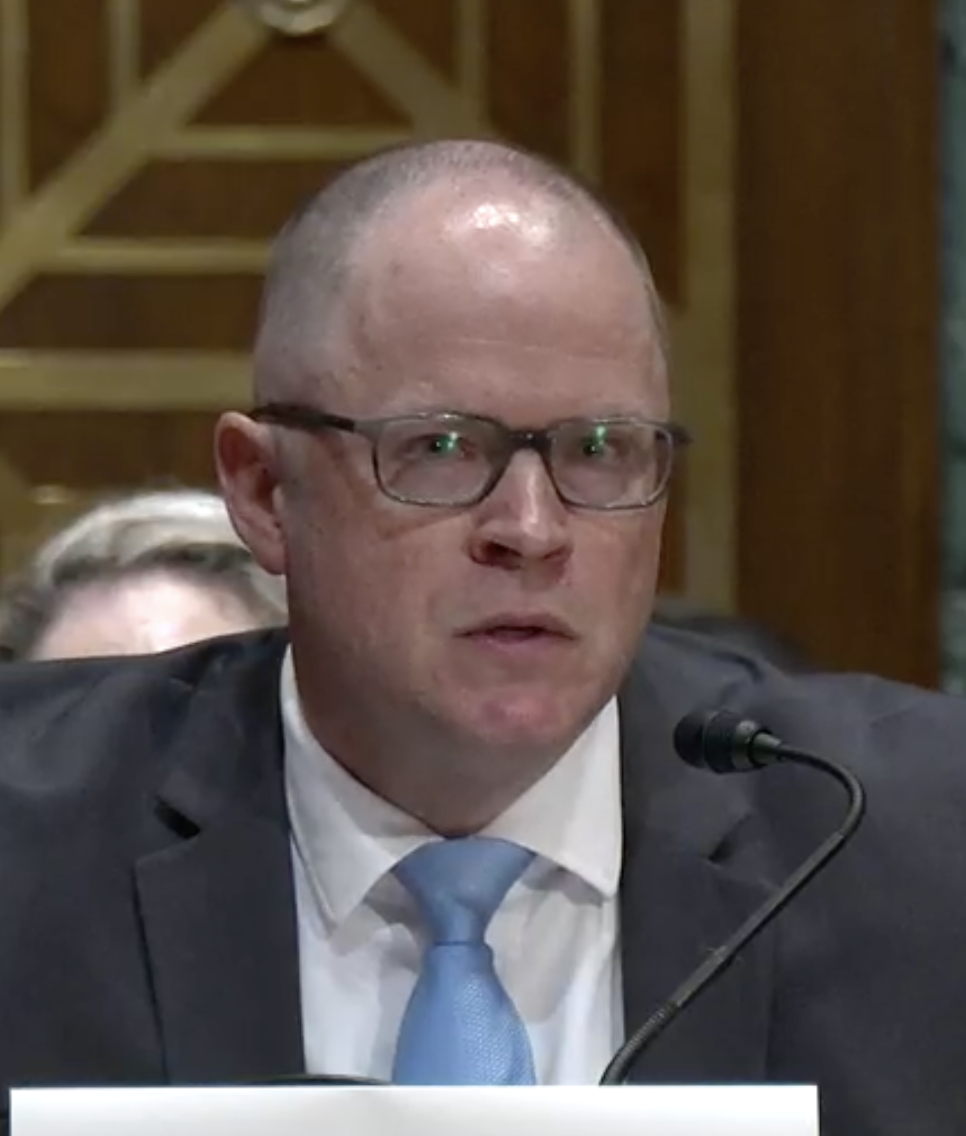

Judge of the United States Tax Court
- Incumbent
- Assumed office October 3, 2024
- Appointed by: Joe Biden
- Preceded by: Richard T. Morrison

Personal details
- Born: Benjamin Alfred Guider III
- Education: University of Virginia (BA); Tulane University (JD)

Benjamin Alfred Guider III is an American lawyer who is serving as a judge of the United States Tax Court.

== Education ==
Guider earned a Bachelor of Arts from the University of Virginia in 2001 and a Juris Doctor from Tulane University Law School in 2004.

== Career ==
From 2008 to 2023, Guider was an attorney at Coats Rose Professional Corporation. In 2023, he joined Longwell Riess, L.L.C. as a housing attorney.

=== Tax court service ===
On May 9, 2024, President Joe Biden nominated Guider to serve as a judge of the United States Tax Court. He was nominated to the seat vacated by Judge Richard T. Morrison, whose term expired on August 28, 2023. On July 10, 2024, a hearing on his nomination was held before the Senate Finance Committee. On July 25, 2024, his nomination was reported out of committee by a 27–0 vote. On September 25, 2024, the United States Senate confirmed him by a voice vote. He was sworn in on October 3, 2024.

== Memberships ==
Guider is a member of the American Bar Association's Forum on Affordable Housing and Community Development Law, as well as a member of the Louisiana State Bar Association and the State Bar of California.

Legal offices
Preceded by Richard T. Morrison	Judge of the United States Tax Court; 2024–present	Incumbent
