= Carolann =

Carolann is a feminine given name that is an alternate spelling of Carol and a variant of Caroline. Notable people known by this name include the following:

- Carolann Davids, known as C. A. Davids (born 1971), South African writer and editor
- Carolann Héduit (born 2003), French artistic gymnast
- Carolann Page (born 1950), American singer and actress
- Carolann Susi, a name sometimes used for credits for Carol Ann Susi (1952 – 2014), American actress

== See also ==
- Carolan (surname)
- Carolane Soucisse
- Carolanne
- Carolynn
