= McCrary & Branson =

Knoxville, Tennessee studio and gallery

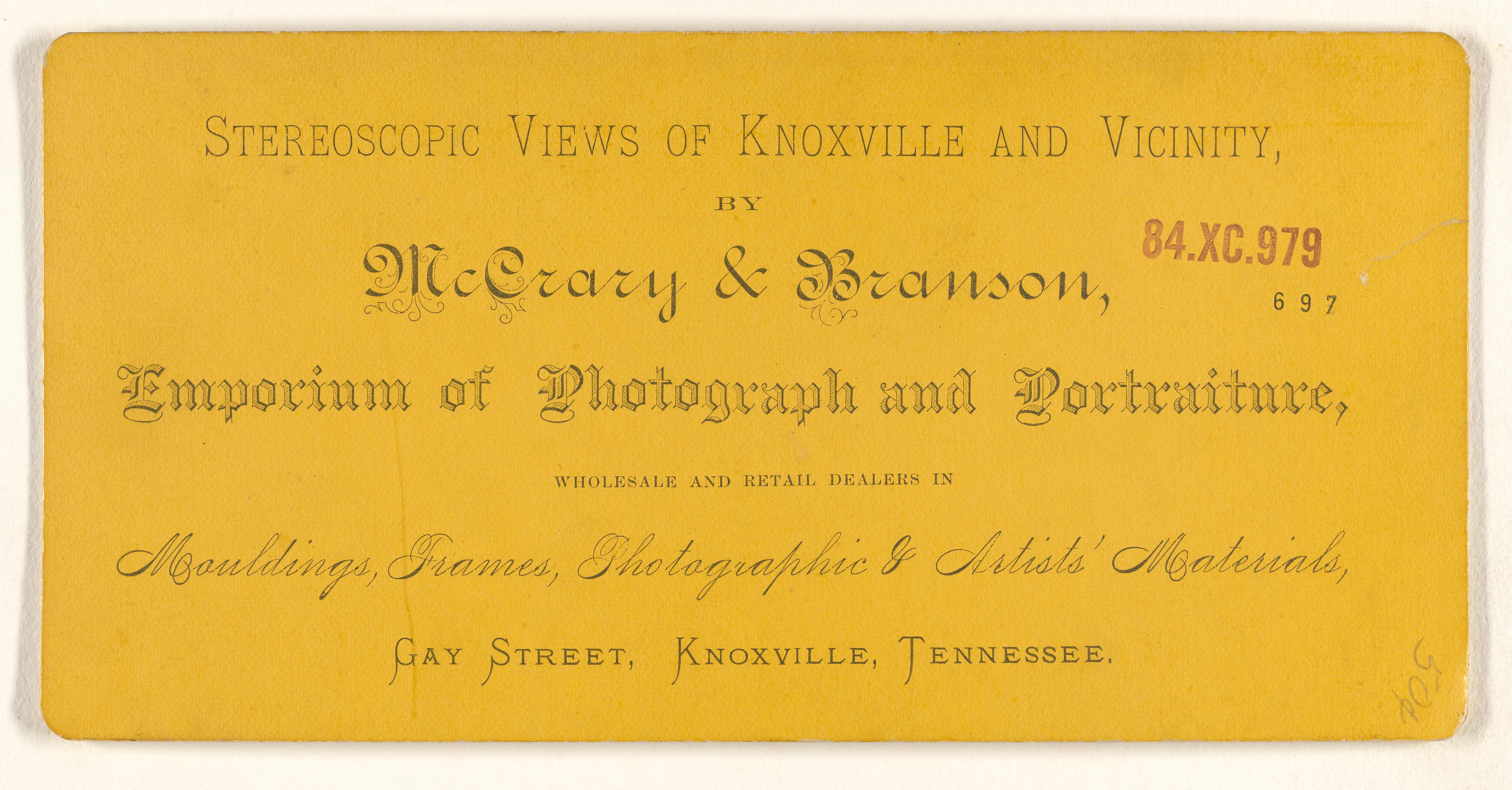
Stereoscopic view (verso), McCrary & Branson, photographer (J. Paul Getty Museum)

McCrary & Branson was a commercial art gallery and portrait studio that operated for approximately 30 years in the late 19th and early 20th century in Knoxville, Tennessee in the United States. The firm was likely in operation beginning approximately 1875–1880 and ending approximately 1905. For much of its history, McCrary & Branson was located at 130 Gay Street, along Knoxville's major commercial thoroughfare. In addition to stereoscopic views, and posed portraits of wealthy whites, they trafficked in a number of racist lithographs depicting blacks in crude and stereotyped scenarios.

The panoramic lithographs included titles like "The Last One In's a Nigger," "Ain't Gwine Be No Rine," and "All Coons Look Alike to Me," the last of which was also a popular song of the day. These images were commercially lucrative for the firm and McCrary & Branson made a point to copyright these images to protect their intellectual property, in one case entering into litigation to defend their claim. The images of the babies in the Alligator Bait photograph were nonetheless plagiarized for "Alligator Bait" postcards published by Curt Teich, et al.

An image called "She Was Bred in Old Kentucky" was "sold for $5,000 to a Louisville firm." The image was heavily used in advertisements and marketing materials for Green River Whiskey, which was distilled in Owensboro, Kentucky.

== McCrary ==
Franklin Bell McCrary (November 14, 1849 – April 10, 1921) was an American photographer. He operated McCrary and Branson in partnership with painter Lloyd Branson in Knoxville, Tennessee and later entered the syrup manufacturing business. McCrary was born in Sullivan County, Tennessee. Frank McCrary may have composed the firm's bestselling Alligator Bait lithograph; according to a 1900 feature article about Branson, "His partner showed it to him declaring it would prove popular and had it copyrighted. Branson took no special interest in it but regarding it as clever, perhaps, but rather low art." McCrary died in Knoxville of chronic myocarditis and was buried at Woodlawn Cemetery.

== Branson ==
Enoch Lloyd Branson (August 8, 1853 – June 12, 1925) was a celebrated painter recognized for his portraits and his "heroic genre scenes." According to the Knoxville Museum of Art, "Branson devised a method of producing vivid portraits based on photographs, which provided his primary income as an artist."

== Gallery ==
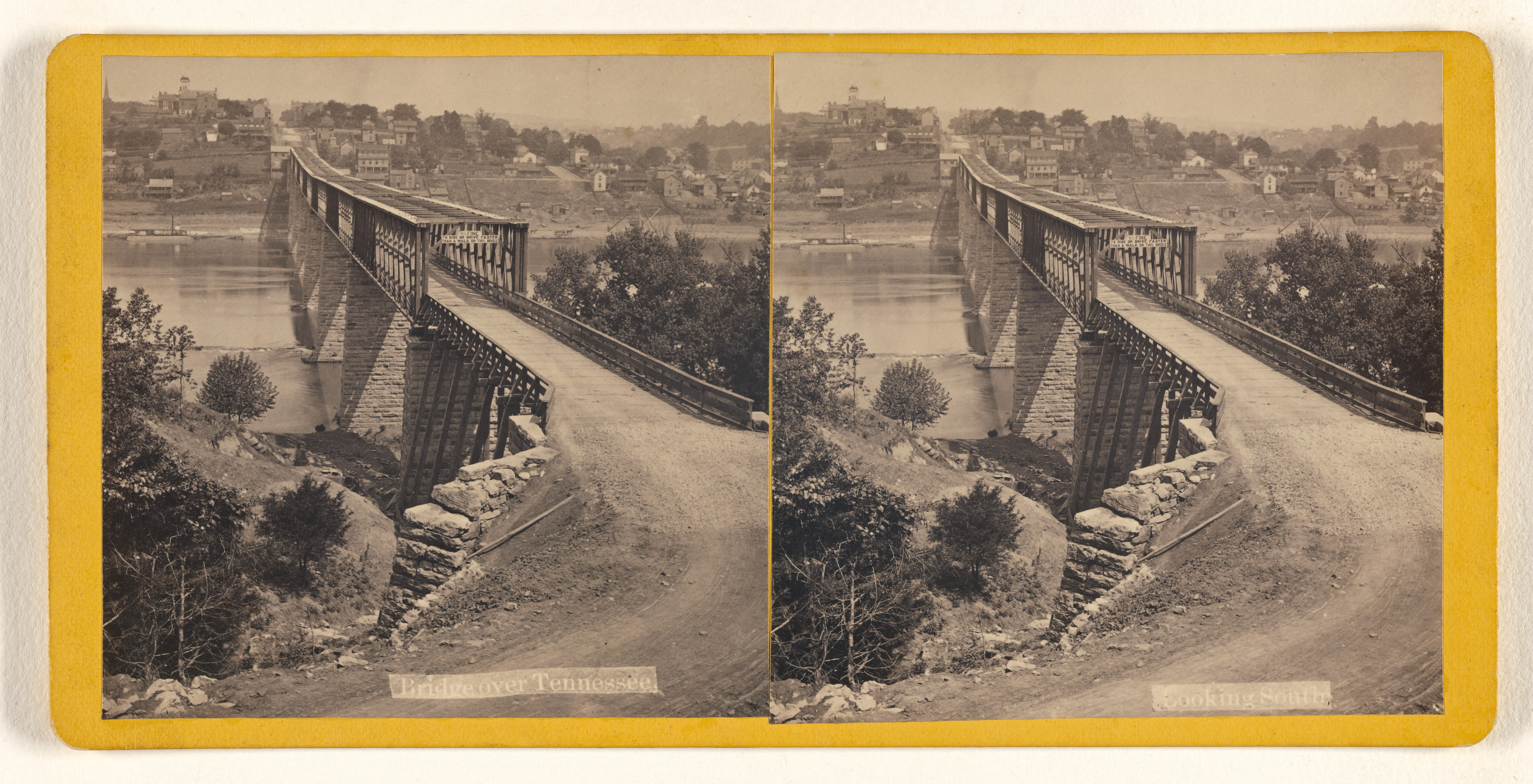
Bridge over Tennessee. Looking South, 1870s, albumen silver print (The J. Paul Getty Museum, Gift of Weston J. and Mary M. Naef)

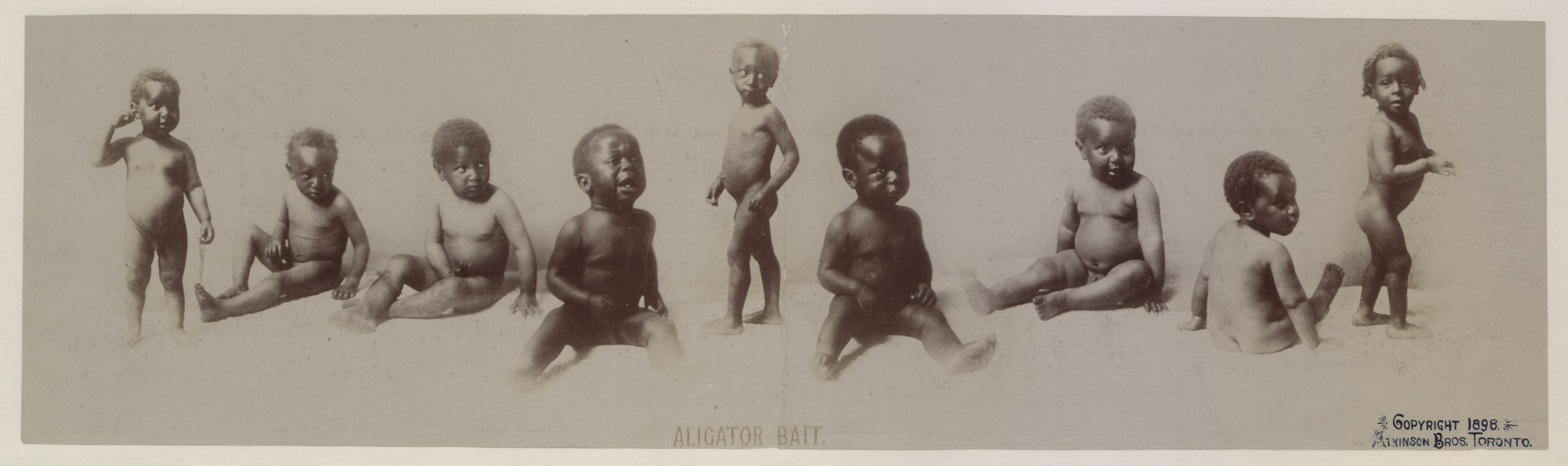
The alligator bait trope was the basis of the commercial appeal of this photograph published by McCrary & Branson, 1897 (British Library)

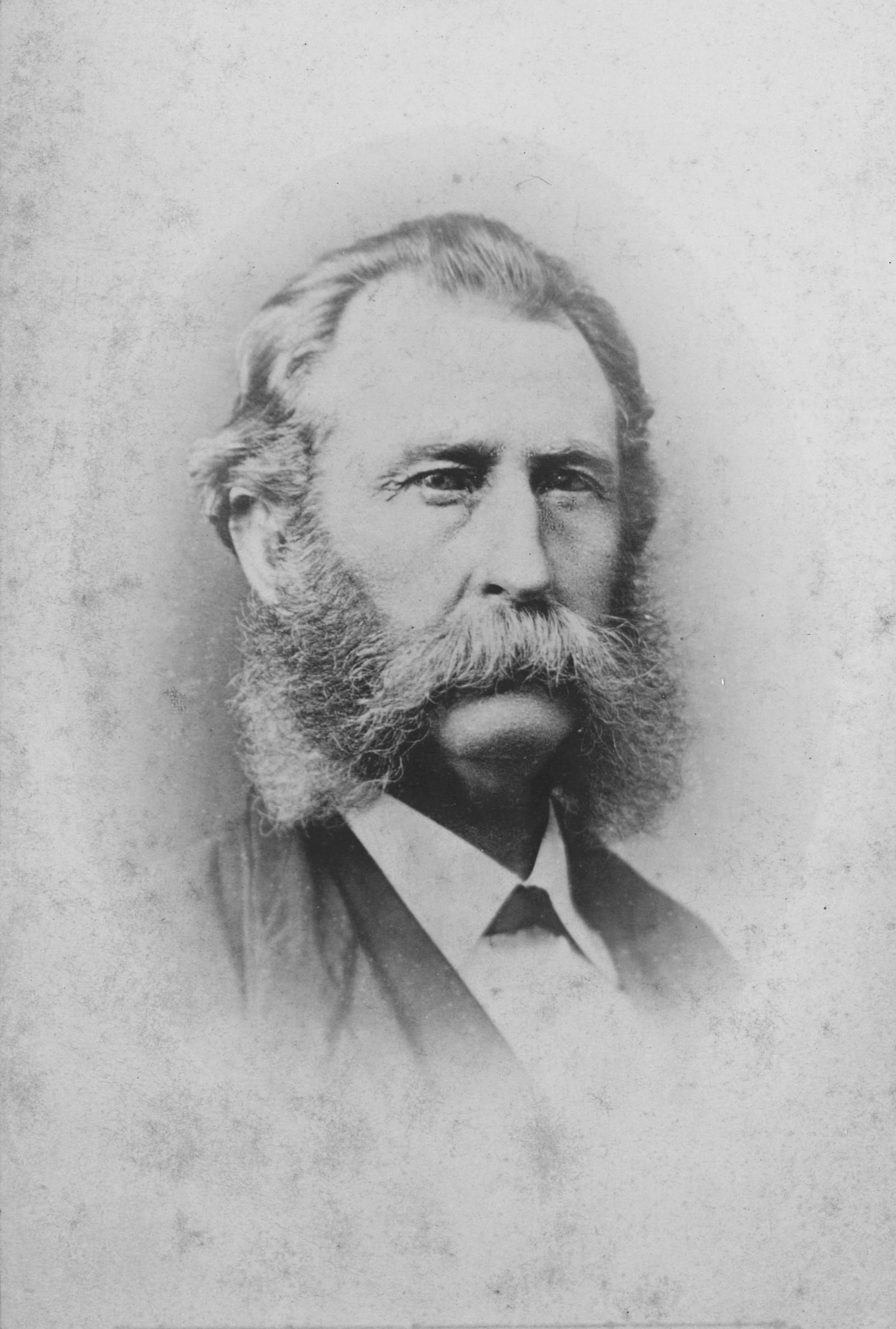
McCrary & Branson photo of Joseph A. Mabry II, c. 1880 (Middle Tennessee State University collection)

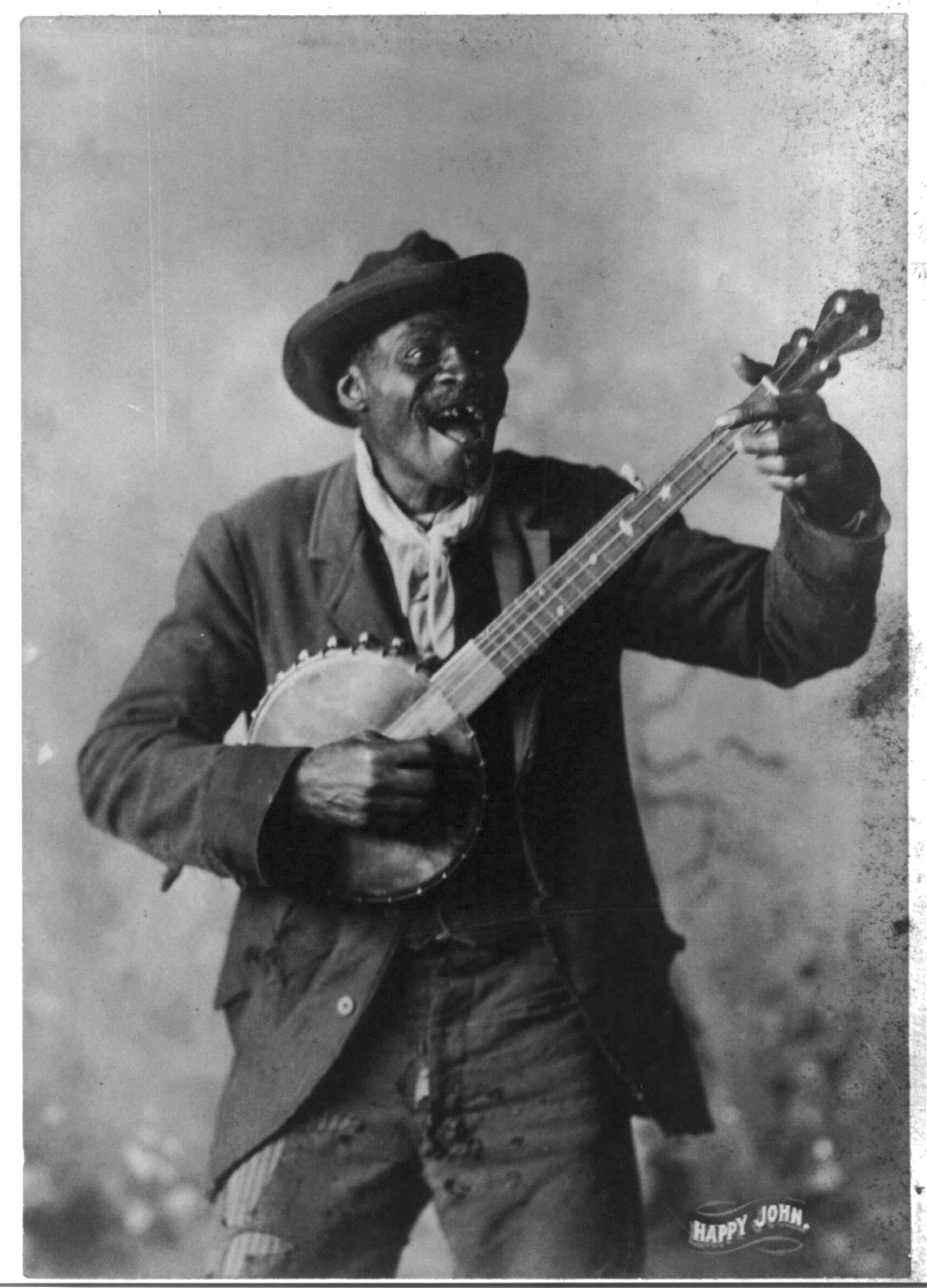
McCrary and Branson photograph of African-American banjo player "Happy John" Woods, date unknown; this image is reproduced on the cover of The Rough Guide to Blues Songsters (Library of Congress collection)

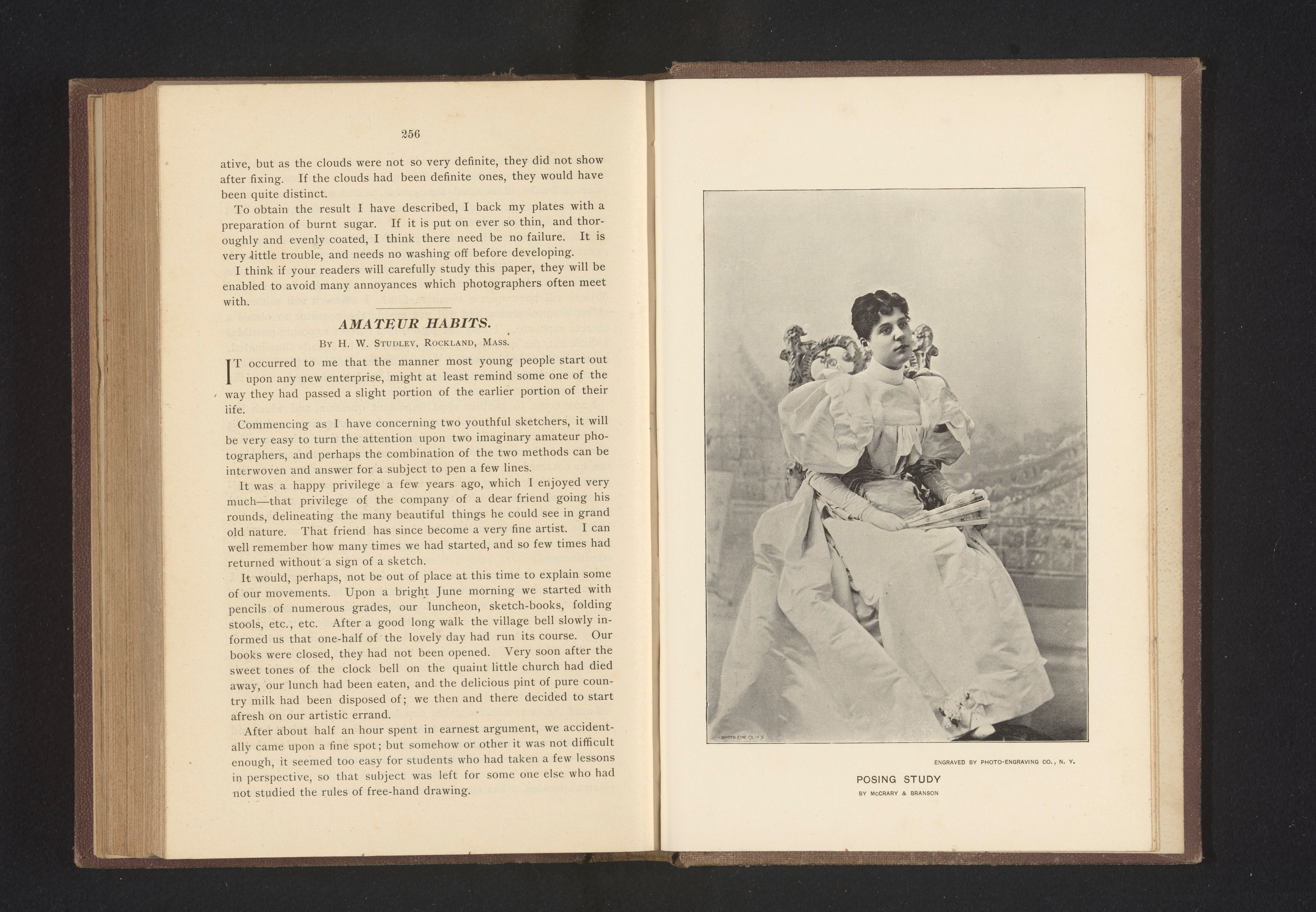
"Posing Study", McCrary & Branson, in The international annual of Anthony's photographic bulletin (Rijksmuseum collection)
