= Carlyne =

Carlyne is both a given name that is a variant of Carly and Caroline. Notable people with the name include:

- Arthur Carlyne Niven Dixey, full name of Arthur Dixey (1889–1954), British Member of Parliament
- Carlyne Cerf de Dudzeele, French stylist, art director and photographer

== See also ==
- Carlyn
- Carolyne
- Carline
- Carlyle (disambiguation)
- Carbyne (disambiguation)
