= Alligator meat =

Meat from alligators that is for consumption

Alligator meat is the meat from alligators that is for consumption. In the Southern United States, alligator meat is commonly eaten, where it is regarded as a delicacy and staple in local cuisines both historically and in modern times. Alligator eggs can also be consumed. Alligator meat is high in protein and low in fat, and has a mild flavor and firm texture.

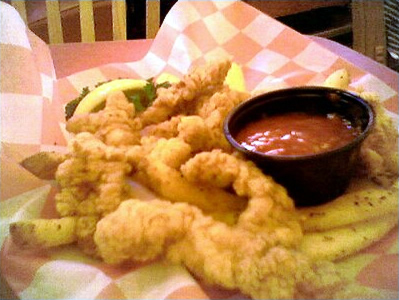
Deep fried alligator tail at a restaurant in Texas

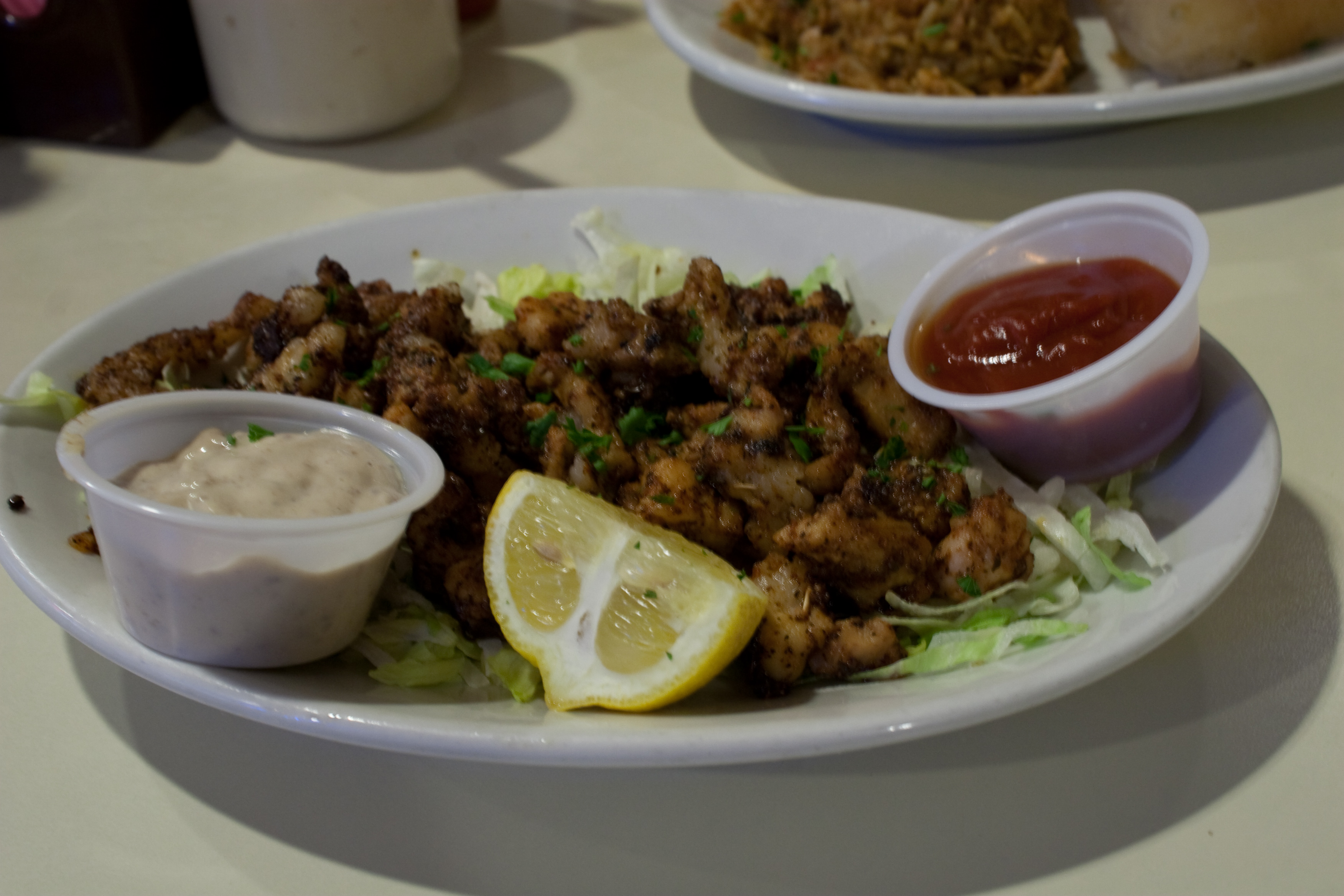
Blackened alligator at Felix's restaurant in New Orleans, Louisiana, United States

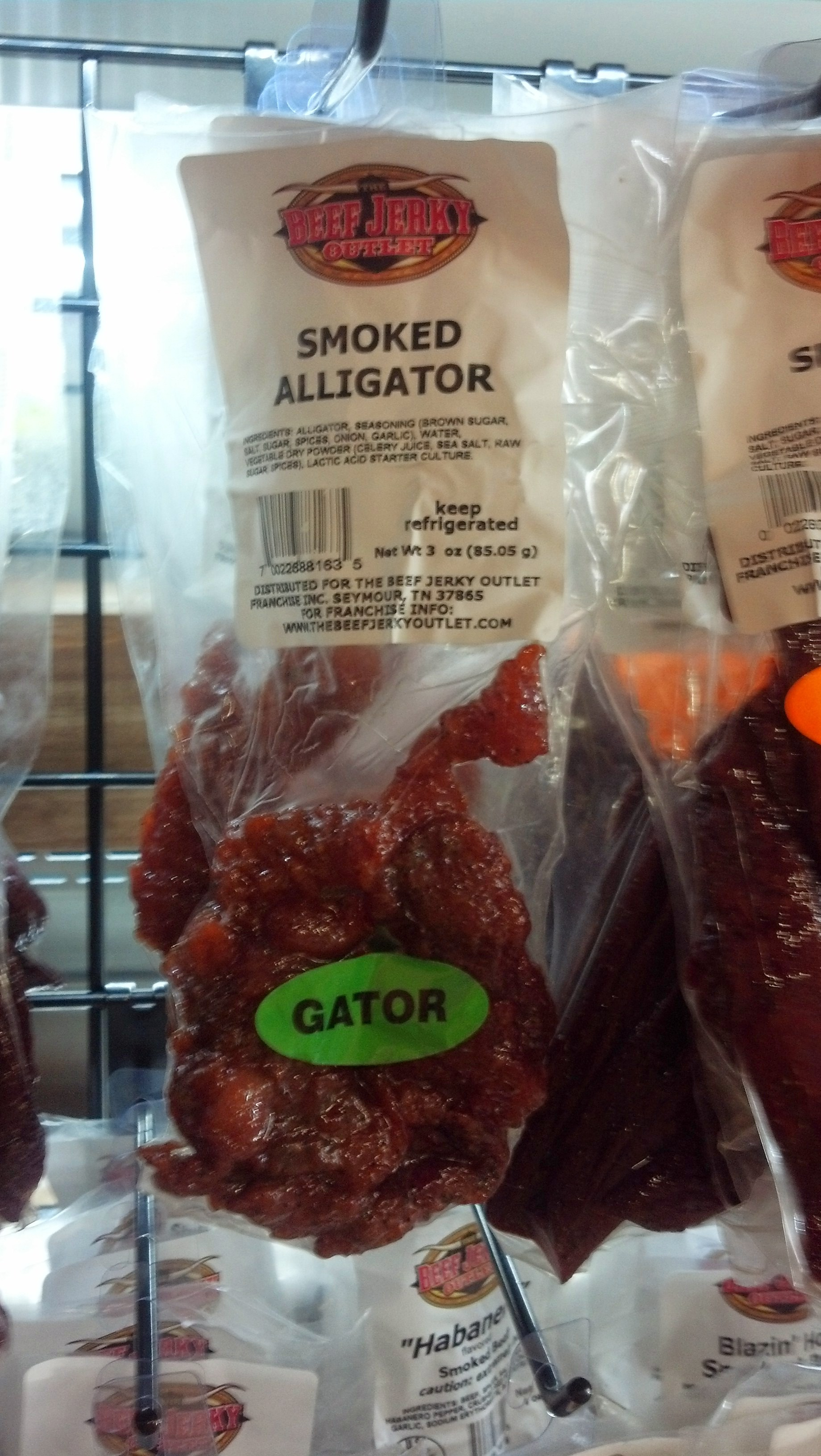
Smoked alligator jerky at a store in Richfield, Wisconsin, United States

In the United States, alligator meat is available for consumer purchase in specialty food stores, some grocery stores, and can also be mail ordered.

== Composition ==
A 100-gram (3 1/2-ounce) reference serving of alligator meat provides 600 kilojoules (143 kilocalories) of food energy, 29 grams of protein, 3 percent fat and 65 milligrams of cholesterol. It also contains a significant amount of phosphorus, potassium, vitamin B12, niacin and monounsaturated fatty acids.

Alligator meat has been described as having a mild flavor and a firm texture. It tastes like quail, with a mildly fishy flavor, and is often chewy, depending on preparation.

== Preparation ==
Various methods of preparation and cooking exist, including tenderization, marination, deep frying, stewing, roasting, smoking and sauteeing. Alligator meat is used in dishes such as gumbo, and is used in traditional Louisiana Creole cuisine. It also can be made into pet food.

Cuts from the animal used include meat from the animal's tail and backbone, which have been described as "the choicest cuts".

== History ==
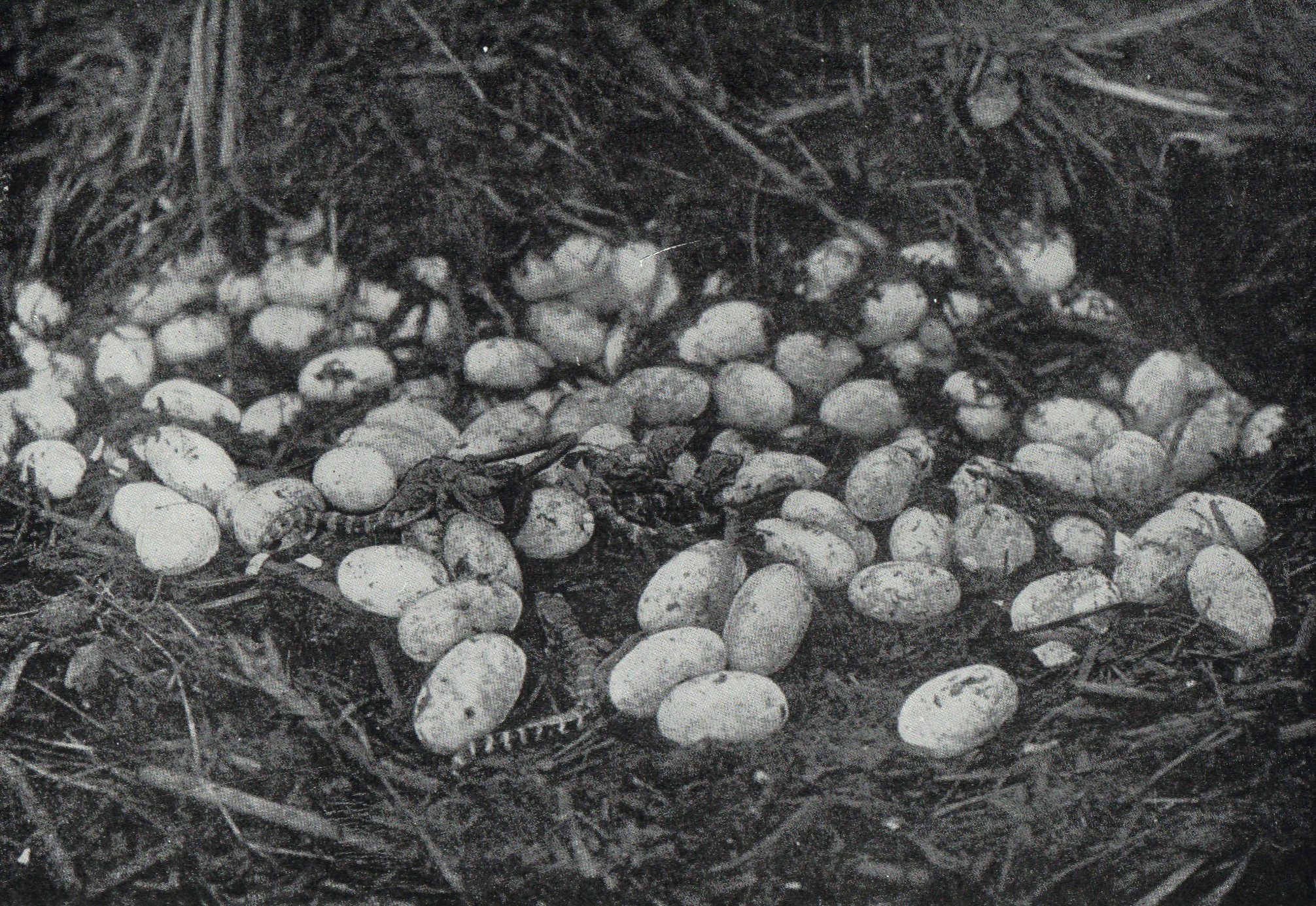
Alligator eggs are also consumed by humans.

=== United States ===
In the mid-1800s, alligator meat was used in some regional cuisines in parts of the Southern United States. During this time, it was used in dishes such as gumbo.

Alligator eggs were a part of the cuisine in many areas of the Southern United States in the early 1900s. During this time people would harvest the eggs and then sell them as a source of income.

Harvesting of wild alligator eggs is illegal without a proper permit; violators face serious fines and jail time.

== Religion ==
=== Islam ===
It is a matter of ongoing debate among Islamic scholars as to whether alligator meat is halal. Some consider alligator haram as a predatory animal. However, due to their aquatic nature, alligator meat is generally deemed halal, following the same tenets that apply to fish and other scaled aquatic life. Alligator meat is not explicitly condemned under Sharia.

=== Christianity ===
In 2010, the Archdiocese of New Orleans declared that alligator meat belongs to the "fish family" and, for the purposes of the Friday fast, is considered seafood, therefore allowing Catholics to consume it on Fridays and Ash Wednesday.

== Legal status ==
=== United States ===
In the United States, farming alligator for meat and hides is legal and practiced in states such as Georgia, South Carolina, Alabama, Arkansas, Mississippi, North Carolina, Florida, Louisiana, and Texas.

Alligator hunting is legal in Arkansas, South Carolina, Louisiana, Florida, Georgia, and Texas.

== See also ==
- Game (hunting)
