= William M. Fay =

American judge (1915–2000)

William Michael Fay (May 14, 1915 – April 12, 2000) was a judge of the United States Tax Court from 1961 to 1985.

Born in Pittston, Pennsylvania, Fay attended St. John's Academy in Pittston, and studied at Georgetown University and Columbia University, receiving an LL.B. from the Catholic University of America, in 1942. He served in World War II from 1942 to 1945, serving successively as a Naval Intelligence Officer, Gunnery Officer and Legal Officer.

He was Assistant Counsel to the United States Senate Special Committee on Atomic Energy in 1946, and Executive Assistant to Senator Brien McMahon of Connecticut from 1946 to 1948. He was in the Office of Chief Counsel of the Internal Revenue Service from 1948 to 1957, serving first as a trial attorney, then as Assistant Head of the Civil Division, then as Assistant Head of the Appeals Division, and finally as Assistant Regional Counsel. On August 3, 1961, President John F. Kennedy appointed Fay to the United States Tax Court, where he remained until his retirement on May 14, 1985.

In 1945, Fay married Jean M. Burke of Plainfield, New York, with whom he had a son, Michael.

Fay died from cancer at the age of 84.
