= Carolyn Baxter =

African-American poet, playwright, and musician

Carolyn Baxter (born 1953) is an African-American poet, playwright, and musician. Baxter is from Harlem, New York. She was a participant in the Black Panthers School Breakfast Program. Baxter was formerly incarcerated at the New York City Correctional Institute for Women at Rikers Island. Her writings are considered a part of the Prison Art's Movement of the 1960s and 1970s.

== Biography ==
Baxter worked for the National Association for the Advancement of Colored People NAACP and was a member of the Black Panthers Party. She also worked for the New York City Board of Education in programs for ex-offenders and adolescent offenders.

Baxter was formerly incarcerated at the New York City Correctional Institute for Women at Rikers Island. There, she joined the Free Space Writing Project. Her writings are considered a part of the Prison Art's Movement of the 1970s and 1980s. Baxter served time with the singer/poet Marilyn Buck. Baxter attended BARD College after her incarceration.

Brown University did an exhibit titled, Poetry in the Time of Mass Incarceration, which displayed Baxter's writings in the John Hay Library's Willis Reading Room at Brown from September 2015 – January 4, 2016. Her work has been used in studies of the prison industrial complex.

== Publications ==
=== Books ===
- Prison Solitary and Other Free Government Services (Greenfield Review Press, 1979)

=== Anthologies ===
- 20th Century Prison Writings (Penguin/Putnam, 1998)
- The Light from Another Country (Greenfield Review Press, 1984),
- Wall Tappings Vol 1 (Feminist Press, 1986)
- Wall Tappings Vol 2 (Feminist Press, 2005)
