= Mark Woolhouse =

Mark Woolhouse OBE FRSE FMedSci
- Born: 1959 (age 66–67); Shrewsbury, Shropshire
- Education: University of Oxford (1980); University of York (1981); Queen's University at Kingston (1985)
- Spouse: Francisca Mutapi
- Scientific career
- Workplaces: University of Edinburgh

Mark Edward John Woolhouse (born 1959) is professor of infectious disease epidemiology at the Usher Institute in the College of Medicine and Veterinary Medicine at the University of Edinburgh, Scotland.

== Early life and education ==
Mark Woolhouse was born in 1959 in Shrewsbury, Shropshire. He holds a bachelor's degree in zoology from the University of Oxford (1980), a Master of Science degree in biological computation from the University of York (1981) and a doctor of philosophy degree in biology from the Queen's University at Kingston, Canada (1985).

== Career ==
Woolhouse is professor of infectious disease epidemiology at the Usher Institute in the University of Edinburgh College of Medicine and Veterinary Medicine.

Woolhouse is a fellow of the Royal Society of Edinburgh and of the Academy of Medical Sciences. He was appointed an officer of the Order of the British Empire in the 2002 New Year Honours for services to the control of infectious diseases.

=== COVID-19 ===
In April 2020 Woolhouse was criticised after it emerged he had travelled to a second home on the Island of Lismore hours before lockdown rules were announced. Despite public health advice for those not normally resident on islands to return home, Woolhouse angered residents and remained there for a number of months.

On 19 September 2020, when the UK faced an introduction of "COVID marshals" and an increase in the number of reported cases of COVID-19 that some like Chris Whitty had termed a "second wave", Woolhouse instead favoured a Swedish-style model and "learn to live with COVID."

== Personal life ==
He is married to Francisca Mutapi, a professor in Global Health Infection and Immunity. They have one daughter.

== Selected publications ==
- Woolhouse, M (2011). "How to make predictions about future infectious disease risks". Philos Trans R Soc Lond B Biol Sci. 366: 2045–54. doi:10.1098/rstb.2010.0387. PMC 3130384. PMID 21624924.
