= Carolynne =

Carolynne is a Swedish feminine given name that is an alternate form of Caroline as well as a diminutive form of Carola. Notable people referred to by this name include the following:

== Given name ==
- Carolynne Cunningham (born 1964), Australian film producer director
- Carolynne Poole (born 1980), English singer-songwriter
- Carolynne Snowden (1900–1985), American actress, dancer, and singer

== See also ==
- Carolanne
- Carolyne
- Carolynn
