= Carolyn Barcus =

American psychologist

Carolyn Gay Barcus (born September 3, 1939) is a Native American psychologist and Native American Elder known for her work with Native American students, self-actualization education research, and for her work with the Society of Indian Psychologists conference held annually in Logan, Utah. Barcus' work in psychology has been recognized as significant. In 2006, the American Psychological Association awarded Barcus the Samuel M. Turner Mentor Award. The American Psychological Association also honored Barcus in a postcard series titled Groundbreaking Women of Color Psychologists. In 2026, Barcus’s license to practice as a psychologist was suspended for 5 years as a result of controversial practices surrounding recovered memories in a theraputic setting. Disciplinary document

== Early life ==
Carolyn Barcus was born in Alberta, Canada, in 1939. Barus was raised on the Blackfeet Indian Reservation in the state of Montana. Barcus's biological mother was a member of the Blackfeet Indian Reservation. Barcus attended Montana State University and completed her bachelor's degree in Physical Education. In 1968, she attended Utah State University to obtain a master's degree in physical education. In 1975, Barcus continued with her education by earning a Doctorate of Education degree in Counseling Psychology.

== Research ==
Barcus began her dissertation research in 1973 in self actualization education while at Utah State University. Barcus used this research to support Native American students by building upon effective education strategies through working and supporting teachers by way of improving their interpersonal and communication skills. This research embodied the self-actualization education course that was taught through experiential learning.

== Career ==
Barcus worked as a school teacher for 7 years after completed her bachelor's degree. She worked as a teacher in Montana and Colorado via a program called the Bureau of Indian Affairs Relocation Program. It was this experience that led Barcus to move into the field of psychology. After completing her doctorate degree, Barcus worked for the Utah Department of Corrections, doing private practice until 1978 when she began working as a mental health specialist for the Intermountain Tribal School in Brigham City, Utah.

Barcus stayed with the Intermountain Tribal School until 1984 when she was called to provide mentorship to Native American students at Utah State University who were in the process of completing their master's degree in School Psychology. It was this work that led Barcus to stay at Utah State University to become a clinical assistant professor in the psychology department at Utah State University as well as the clinical director of the American Indian Support Project In this role, Barcus concentrated on recruiting and retaining American Indian students in the university's graduate psychology programs, and she later extended that support to all minority students in the department. By 2006, thirty-two Native American students had completed master's or doctoral programs in psychology at Utah State under the project's mentorship. Colleagues who nominated her for national recognition credited her with much of the supportive atmosphere that ethnic minority students and faculty experienced in the program. As a professor, Barcus continued to mentor and support Native American students in psychology by way of applying for grants and funding to start up the American Indian Psychologists and Psychology Graduate Students conference.

Barcus was recognized by the American Psychological Association in a postcard series entitled: Groundbreaking Women of Color Psychologists. Barcus was awarded the Samuel M. Turner Mentor Award in 2006 by the American Psychological Association. This award reflected Barcus' dedication to supporting minoritized graduate students interested in the psychology field.

== Publications and scholarly work ==
In addition to her mentoring and clinical roles, Barcus contributed to the professional literature on culturally responsive psychological practice. She authored a chapter on guidelines for the psychological treatment of American Indian populations for an American Psychological Association volume on treating ethnic minority populations. With Kenneth W. Merrell, she described the American Indian Support Project at Utah State University as a model for multicultural training in school psychology. Alongside her academic work, Barcus maintained a part-time private practice offering individual and group psychotherapy, with a clinical focus that included adult survivors of childhood sexual abuse, and supervised student therapists.

== Recognition and legacy ==
Barcus received Utah State University's President's Diversity Award in 1997 in recognition of her service to Native American communities. She helped establish and, for many years, hosted the annual national convention of American Indian psychologists and psychology graduate students at Utah State University, an event associated with the Society of Indian Psychologists. A 2023 volume on early research contributions by women of color profiled her under the title "Keeper of the Fire," characterizing her mentorship and her Self-Actualizing Education work as a cornerstone for affective education, cultural competence in education, and the guidance of American Indian psychology students.
