= Carolyn Matthews =

American politician

Member of New Hampshire House of Representatives for Rockingham 3
- In office 2014–2018
- Succeeded by: Kevin Pratt

Personal details
- Party: Republican

Carolyn L. Matthews is an American politician. She was a member of the New Hampshire House of Representatives from 2014 to 2018, and represented Rockingham's 3rd district. She did not stand for re-election in 2018.
