= Carolyn Elliott =

American scholar, author, and occultist

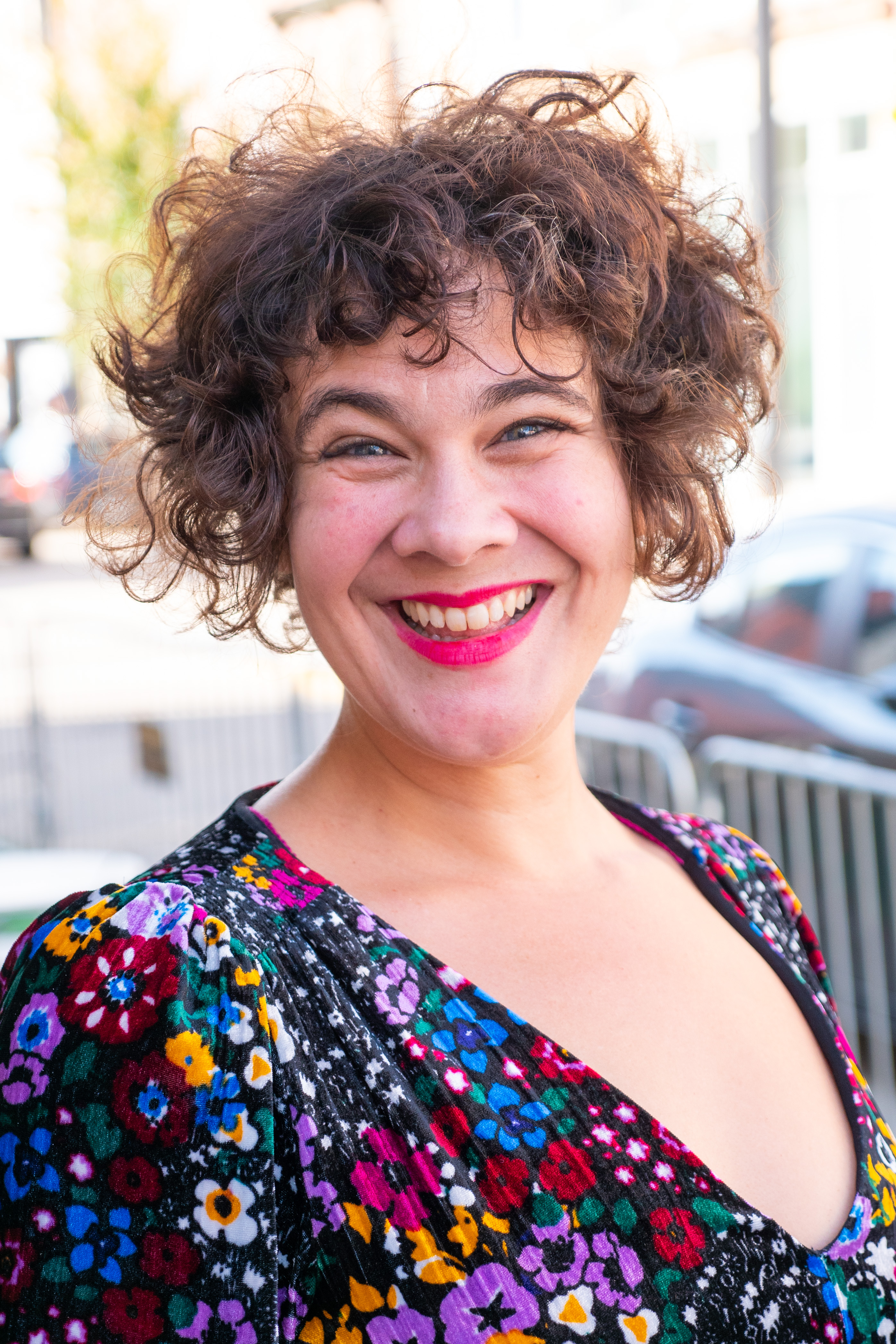
- Elliott in 2020
- Died: July 26, 2026; Pittsburg, PA
- Education: University of Pittsburgh (PhD)
- Occupation: Occultist
- Known for: Existential Kink
- Website: carolynlovewell.com

Carolyn Elliott (died July 26, 2026) was an America life coach,self-help author and occultist. She was the author of the book Existential Kink which focuses on shadow integration as a means for creating positive change in the self. She held a doctorate in critical and cultural studies from the University of Pittsburgh. Elliott taught applied occult philosophy through writing, lectures, online coaching, and in her Sleep Over Mystery School.

== Career ==
Elliott's authored Existential Kink and Awaken Your Genius: A Seven-Step Path to Freeing Your Creativity and Manifesting Your Dreams.

Published in 2020, Existential Kink: Unmask Your Shadow and Embrace Your Power introduces Elliott's meditation methodology known as "existential kink". Existential Kink uses the Jungian idea of the shadow to encourage introspection on repressed dark parts of the self and challenges the individual to consider how they might find pleasure in seemingly undesirable circumstances.

Lovewell was the founder of the online magazine, Witch, (a.k.a. Bad Witches).
