= Carolyn Halstead =

American politician

Member of New Hampshire House of Representatives for Hillsborough 23
- In office December 3, 2014 – December 4, 2018
- Succeeded by: Peter Petrigno

Personal details
- Party: Republican

Carolyn Halstead is an American politician. She was a member of the New Hampshire House of Representatives and represented Hillsborough's 23rd district.
