= Carolyne Mazzo =

Brazilian swimmer

Personal information
- Full name: Carolyne Gomes de Souza Mazzo
- Nationality: Brazil
- Born: March 23, 1997 (age 29) São Paulo, São Paulo, Brazil

Sport
- Sport: Swimming
- Strokes: Breaststroke
- Club: Esporte Clube Pinheiros

Carolyne Gomes de Souza Mazzo (born March 23, 1997, in São Paulo) is a Brazilian swimmer.
