= Carolyn Aronson =

American-Latina entrepreneur (born 1966)

- Born: Iris Ernesta Reyes; 22 December 1966 (age 59)
- Education: Oakland Community College
- Occupation: Entrepreneur

Iris Ernesta Reyes (born December 22, 1966), professionally known as Carolyn Aronson, is an American Latina entrepreneur, who created the styling brand It's a 10 Haircare.

== Early life ==
Some sources report that Aronson was born in Perth Amboy, New Jersey while others state she was born Iris Ernesta Reyes in Puerto Rico. She is of Puerto Rican descent and was adopted by a family in Michigan as a child (when she subsequently became known as Carolyn née Plummer), along with one biological brother.

== Career ==
Aronson became a hairdresser when she was 18. She founded the salon Allianza in Southfield, Michigan in 1998.

Aronson, along with Scott Scharg founded the styling product range LINQ in 2002. The company used multiple vendors for its product line and had significant quality control issues. It closed in 2005.

=== It's a 10 ===
In 2005, Aronson founded It's a 10 with Scharg in Detroit, Michigan, each of whom invested $40,000 in the business. They launched their first product, Miracle Leave-In, in 2006. The product was designed to solve multiple haircare issues for many types of hair. At the time, the product was positioned as a salon-only product, which hairdressers could both use and sell to their customers. They took what was at the time an unusual approach to publicizing their product, giving away samples to hairdressers and consumers in order to generate interest in the product. As of 2020, the company sells over 14 million units of Miracle Leave-In Spray per year.

Aronson bought out Scharg in 2017 and is now the sole owner of the business. It's a 10 ran an advertisement during the 2017 Super Bowl, becoming the first independently owned haircare product brand to do so.

=== Be a 10 ===
In November 2020, Aronson launched the cosmetics brand Be a 10. The stated goal of the brand is to simplify and streamline cosmetics for women.

Dun and Bradstreet reported It's a 10's annual revenue as being $36.72 million in 2021.

In late 2020, however, it was reported by Forbes as having annual revenue of over $400 million. The Miami Herald in 2020 said the company's annual revenue was half a billion dollars.

== Personal life ==
Aronson married Scott Scharg in 2000. They divorced in 2004. She later married Jeff Aronson, CEO of Titan FC, with whom she bought a mansion in December 2019.

In October 2020 Aronson announced that she was 20 weeks pregnant at the age of 53. She gave birth to her daughter, Aliya Dream, on February 12, 2021, and currently has a blended family of three daughters and two sons with her husband.
