= The Eustis Lake Region =

Weekly American newspaper

- Type: Weekly newspaper; Daily newspaper
- Format: Berliner
- Owner: Ansil Daniel Miller
- Editor: Ansil Daniel Miller
- Founded: October 23, 1884
- Language: English
- Headquarters: Eustis, Florida

The Eustis Lake Region was a newspaper in Eustis, Florida.

== History ==
The Eustis Lake Region was first published on October 23, 1884, when Eustis was still a part of Orange County, (before the lake region of Orange County became Lake County, Florida in 1887). Starting out as a weekly, after the paper was acquired by Ansil Daniel Miller it joined the Associated News Service and became a daily.
