= Carl Van Ness =

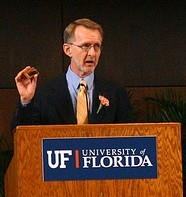
- Van Ness in 2006
- Known for: Being the University of Florida archivist
- Scientific career
- Fields: Library Science
- Workplaces: University of Florida

Carl Van Ness is the Curator of the Manuscripts & Archives Department in the University of Florida Libraries' Special & Area Studies Collections and was appointed the University Historian for the University of Florida in 2006. He followed the former university historian, Sam Proctor.

Prior to this position, Van Ness served as the University of Florida archivist from 1996 to 2006 and worked for the George A. Smathers Libraries.

Van Ness authored The Making of Florida’s Universities: Public Higher Education at the Turn of the Twentieth Century, published in 2023, in which he "traces the development of the schools that later became the University of Florida, Florida State University, and Florida A&M University."
