= Carolyn Davidson =

Carolyn Davidson may refer to:

- Carolyn Davidson (diplomat) (born 1964), British diplomat
- Carolyn Davidson (graphic designer), graphic designer who designed the Nike Swoosh logo
