= Carolyn Dean =

American historian

Carolyn Janice Dean
- Title: Charles J. Stille Professor of History and French
- Awards: Guggenheim Fellowship

Academic background
- Education: University of California, Berkeley

Academic work
- Institutions: Yale University
- Notable works: The Self and Its Pleasures; The Frail Social Body; The Fragility of Empathy After the Holocaust; Aversion and Erasure

Carolyn J. Dean is Charles J. Stille Professor of History and French at Yale University. She was John Hay Professor of International Studies at Brown University until moving to Yale in 2013.

Dean studied history at the University of California, Berkeley for college and graduate school. She taught there and at Northwestern University before joining Brown in 1991. She moved to Yale in 2013 and in 2016 was promoted to Charles J. Stille Professor.

In 1997, Dean won a Guggenheim Fellowship.

== Works ==
- Dean, Carolyn J. (1992). The Self and Its Pleasures: Bataille, Lacan, and the History of the Decentered Subject. Cornell University Press. p. 270. ISBN 978-1-5017-0540-3.
- Dean, Carolyn J. (2000). The Frail Social Body: Pornography, Homosexuality, and Other Fantasies in Interwar France. University of California Press. p. 275. ISBN 978-0-520-92348-5.
- Dean, Carolyn Janice (2004). The Fragility of Empathy After the Holocaust. Cornell University Press. p. 203. ISBN 978-0-8014-8944-0.
- Dean, Carolyn Janice (2010). Aversion and Erasure: The Fate of the Victim After the Holocaust. Ithaca and London: Cornell University Press. p. 193. ISBN 978-0-8014-4944-4.
- Dean, Carolyn J. (2019). The Moral Witness: Trials and Testimony after Genocide. Ithaca and London: Cornell University Press. p. 198. ISBN 978-1-5017-3509-7.
