= Alligator hunting =

Capture and killing of gators

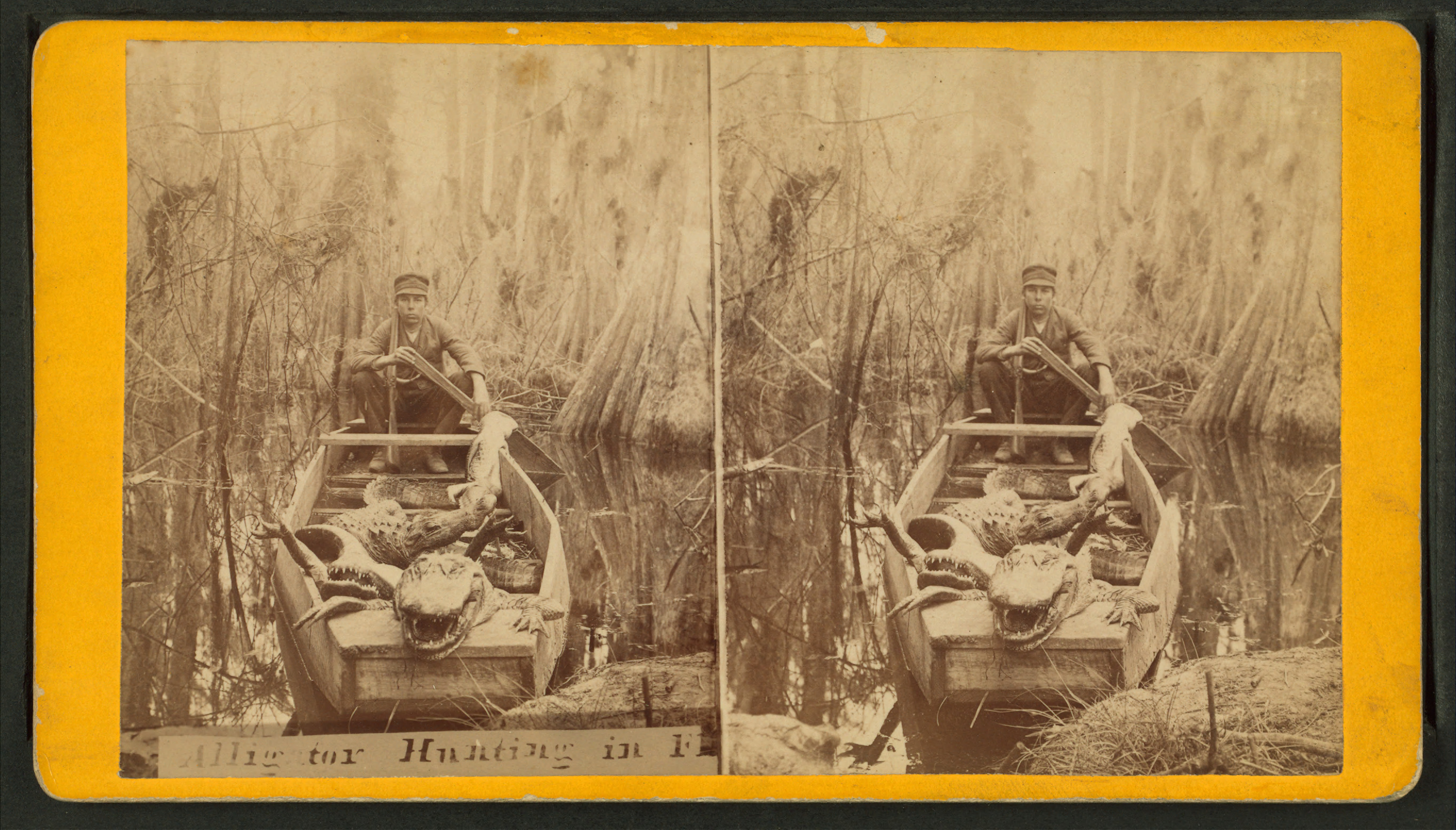
Alligator hunting in Florida

Alligator hunting is the capture and killing of gators. With the appropriate licenses and tags, the American alligator can legally be hunted in the Southeastern United States. The states of Florida, Georgia, Alabama, Arkansas, Mississippi, Louisiana, North Carolina, South Carolina, and Texas all distribute alligator hunting licenses.

== Methods ==
There is no single method of alligator hunting. Depending on the circumstances, hunters commonly use a combination of the following:

- hook and line
- bow and arrow
- gig and snare
- firearm

The use of a hook and line is the most common method. It involves securing a sturdy hook and line to a tree or pole in the ground. The hook is commonly baited with fish or chicken quarter. After the bait is taken, the hunter returns to draw in and dispatch the gator. Allowed methods of hunting vary by state, in South Carolina an alligator must be captured before being killed with either a handgun or bangstick. A bangstick is a specialized underwater firearm fired only when in direct contact with the target.

== History ==
Historically, unregulated hunting has led to dramatic decreases in alligator populations. In 1973 the American alligator was listed as endangered under the Endangered Species Act of 1973. The American alligator was listed as an endangered species in 1967 under a law that was a precursor to the Endangered Species Act of 1973. Since the species' recovery, alligator hunting programs have been established in the majority of U.S. states in the alligator's habitat range.

== Products ==
The main products of alligator hunting are alligator meat and skin. Alligator skins have been harvested since the 1800s. Alligator skin was used in the manufacture of boots, belts, and saddles. In the early 1900s some states began the commercial tanning of alligator skin. The increased popularity of alligator leather led to the rise of alligator farming, now a $60 million industry. Following the global economic recession of 2008, demand for wild alligator skins declined dramatically. In the state of Louisiana the number of reported skins dropped from 35,625 to 9,139 in one year.
