= 2010s in LGBTQ rights =

This is a list of notable events in LGBTQ rights that took place in the 2010s.

== Overview ==
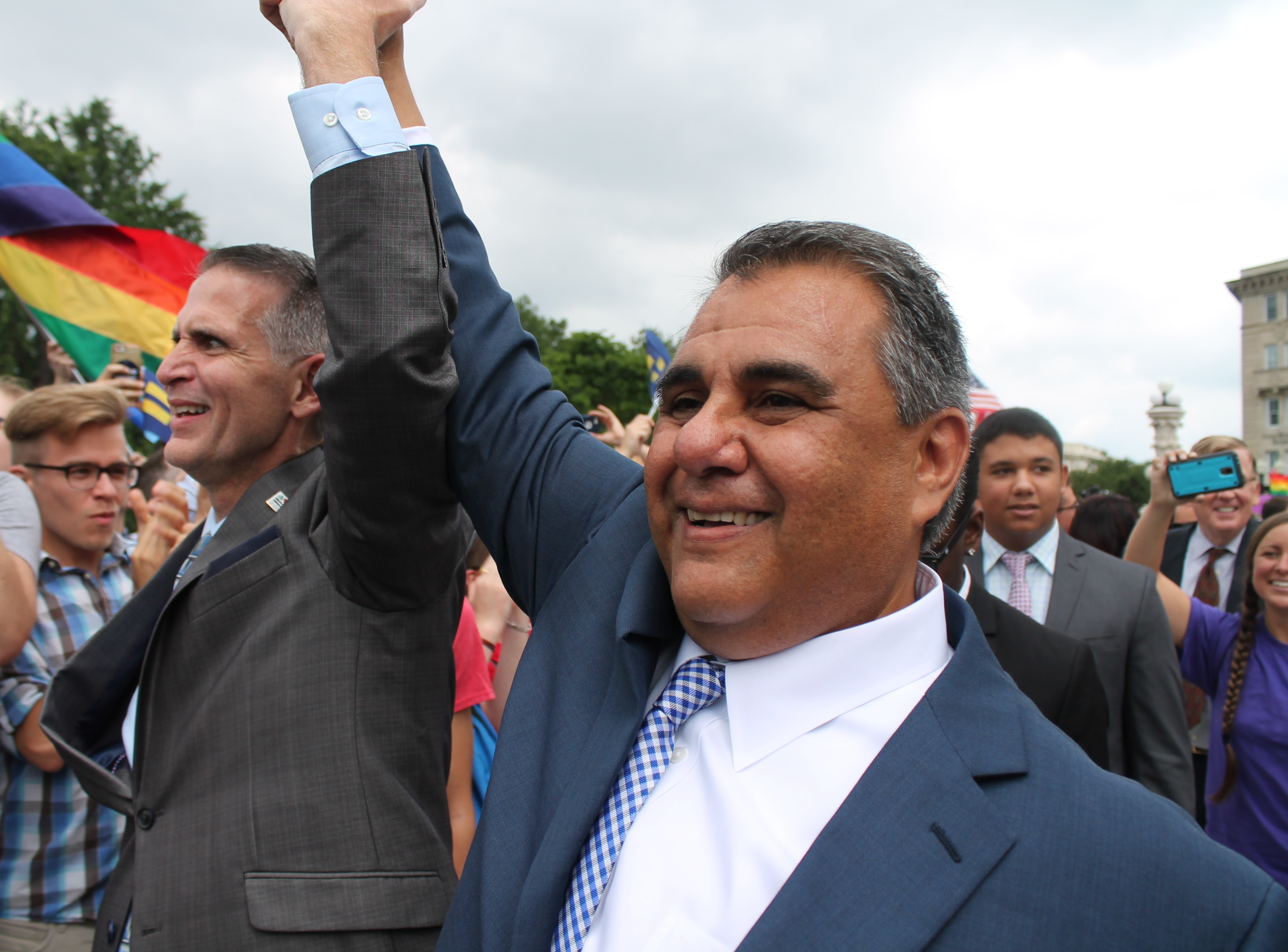
Plaintiffs celebrate outside the Supreme Court of the United States on 26 June 2015 following same-sex marriage legalization in the United States nationwide.

During the 2010s, acceptance of LGBTQ people slowly increased in many parts of the world. Same-sex marriage rights was a topic of ongoing debate in many nations, while over eighteen nations legalized same-sex marriage.

In June 2011, the United Nations Human Rights Council passed the UN's first-ever motion condemning discrimination against gays, lesbians, and bisexuals, commissioning a report on the issue. During an ABC News interview in 2012, Barack Obama expressed his support for gay marriage, becoming the first US president to do so. Although many nations allowed gays and bisexuals to serve in their militaries, a major milestone came in September 2011 when the US abolished its "Don't ask, don't tell" policy.

In 2015, Ireland became the first nation to legalize same-sex marriage via a referendum. In 2017, Leo Varadkar became Ireland's first openly gay Taoiseach, joining the ranks of other nation's first openly gay and lesbian heads of state in the 2010s.

In April 2015, former Olympic athlete Caitlyn Jenner came out as a transgender woman, and was subsequently called the most famous openly transgender person in the world. On June 26 of the same year, same-sex marriage was legalized in all 50 states of the U.S. as the Supreme Court of the United States ruled in a 5–4 vote that refusing to grant marriage licenses to gay and lesbian couples violated the Fourteenth Amendment of the United States Constitution, which guarantees citizens the rights to due process and equal protection. Organizations such as the Boy Scouts of America, Girl Scouts of the USA, and the Episcopal Church announced acceptance of transgender people in the 2010s.

However, LGBT rights supporters faced obstacles with the implementation of laws curbing expression of homosexuality in Russia and China, as well as in the United States, with the Trump administration's decisions to reinstate the ban on transgender people serving in the military, as well as the repeal of protections for transgender students.

== Events by year ==
=== 2010 ===
- February 2 — The United States Tax Court rules in O'Donnabhain v. Commissioner that taxpayers may deduct the medical costs associated with treating gender identity disorder from their federal income taxes.
- March 1 — Crime Decree 2009 decriminalizes homosexuality in Fiji. Fiji becomes the first Pacific Island country to formally decriminalize homosexuality.
- March 4 — Mexico City's same-sex marriage and adoption laws come into effect. This follows twenty-two couples taking part in a symbolic marriage ceremony in Tlaxcala on February 26 to highlight the issue.
- March 31 — The Committee of Ministers of the Council of Europe adopts a recommendation on measures to combat discrimination on grounds of sexual orientation or gender identity.
- April 8 — Portugal abolishes the ban on gay and bisexual men donating blood.
- May 17 — Amid controversy, a law enabling same-sex marriage in Portugal is promulgated by president Aníbal Cavaco Silva, although adoption is ruled out. The law comes into force on June 5, with the first marriage on June 7.
- June 2 — United States President Barack Obama issues a memorandum ordering federal departments and agencies to extend spousal benefits to same-sex couples to the extent permitted by the Defense of Marriage Act.
- June 27 — Same-sex marriage in Iceland is legalized with Prime Minister Jóhanna Sigurðardóttir and her partner, Jónína Leósdóttir, among the first to make use of the law.
- August 4 — District Judge Vaughn R. Walker rules in Perry v. Schwarzenegger that Proposition 8, the state constitutional amendment barring same-sex marriage in California, is in violation of the constitution. The United States Court of Appeals for the Ninth Circuit issues an emergency stay without explanation on August 16.
- September 13 — Chief of the Defence Force of Australia Angus Houston issues an order lifting the ban on transgender personnel.
- September 29 — Tasmania passes a bill recognizing legal same-sex marriages performed outside Tasmania.
- December 22 — The Don't Ask, Don't Tell Repeal Act of 2010 is signed into law by United States President Barack Obama following its passage by the United States Congress.

=== 2011 ===
- January 1 — The Civil Partnership and Certain Rights and Obligations of Cohabitants Act 2010 comes into effect in Ireland, allowing same-sex couples to enter civil partnerships.
- January 31 — Following its passage in December 2010, Illinois Governor Pat Quinn signs the Illinois Religious Freedom Protection and Civil Union Act. The law is scheduled to take effect June 1 and allows all couples, regardless of gender, to enter into civil unions which provide all of the state benefits of marriage.
- April 13 — Rear Admiral Mark L. Tidd, Chief of Chaplains of the United States Navy, issues a two-page "guidance" memo stating that following final repeal of the "don't ask, don't tell" policy, same-sex couples will be allowed to marry in Naval facilities with Naval chaplains officiating in those states in which same-sex marriage is legal.
- April 29 — The United States Department of Labor updates its internal equal employment opportunity policy to bar discrimination on the basis of gender identity.
- June 24 — Following a 36–26 vote passing exemptions for religious organizations, the New York Senate passes a chapter amendment legalizing same-sex marriage. The New York State Assembly approves the bill by 80–63 and it is signed into law shortly before midnight by Governor Andrew Cuomo. New York becomes the largest state in the United States to recognize same-sex marriage.
- September 20 — "Don't ask, don't tell", the law which had excluded LGBT people from serving openly in the United States military since 1993, expires nine months after it was legislatively repealed. The United States Army is the first branch of the military to officially announce that the exclusionary policy is over.
- December 1 — In Australia, the Parliament of Queensland passes the Civil Partnership Bill.
- December 6 — Elio Di Rupo of Belgium becomes the first openly gay male leader of a European Union country.

=== 2012 ===
- February 7 — The United States Court of Appeals for the Ninth Circuit rules in Perry v. Schwarzenegger that California's Proposition 8, which restricts marriage to mixed-sex couples, is unconstitutional.
- May 8 — In the United States, North Carolina voters approve Amendment 1 to the state constitution, banning same-sex marriages and any "domestic legal union".
- May 28 — In Moldova, a bill that bans discrimination on the basis of sexual orientation in employment is signed into law by President Nicolae Timofti.
- May 31 — In the United States, the 1st Circuit Court of Appeals strikes down Section 3 of the Defense of Marriage Act as unconstitutional.
- December 5 — The Supreme Court of Mexico unanimously strikes down a same-sex marriage ban in the southern state of Oaxaca, paving the way for same-sex marriages nationally.

=== 2013 ===
- January 1 — Same-sex marriage becomes legal in the U.S. state of Maryland.
- January 2 — The National Assembly of France approves Article 1 of the same-sex marriage bill by 249–97.
- January 5 — The Parliament of the United Kingdom passes the Marriage (Same Sex Couples) Bill with a vote of 400–175, legalizing same-sex marriage in England and Wales.
- April 23 — The National Assembly of France approves a marriage equality bill in a second voting, legalizing same-sex marriage and adoption.
- May 1 — Civil unions become legal in the U.S. state of Colorado.
- May 14 — Same-sex marriage becomes legal in Brazil after the Federal Court ruled that the government was not allowed to discriminate against gay people in the provision of marriage licenses.
- May 30 — The Nigerian parliament passes a law banning same-sex marriage.
- July 1 — Same-sex marriage becomes legal in the U.S. state of Delaware.
- August 1 — Same-sex marriage becomes legal in the U.S. states of Rhode Island and Minnesota.
- August 5 — Same-sex marriage becomes legal in Uruguay after it was passed on May 10 by the Chamber of Deputies of Uruguay with 71 affirmative votes out of 92 in its second reading, making Uruguay the second country in Latin America, after Argentina, and twelfth overall, to legalize same-sex marriage. The law was previously passed by the Senate on April 2 by a 23–8 vote.
- December 11 — The Supreme Court of India overrules the Delhi Court in re-establishing the primacy of section 377 of the Indian penal code that makes homosexual activity illegal.
- December 12 — The High Court of Australia overrules the Australian Capital Territory's law allowing same-sex marriage in contravention of the Marriage Act saying the federal parliament alone could set such laws. The ruling annuls weddings that have already taken place.
- December 17 — The Parliament of Uganda approves the Uganda Anti-Homosexuality Bill, which originally proposed the death penalty for homosexuality but now contains the punishment of life in prison for "aggravated homosexuality". The bill must be signed by the President of Uganda before becoming law.
- December 19 — The New Mexico Supreme Court ruled unanimously that the state must issue marriage licenses to couples without respect to gender.

=== 2014 ===
- January 13 — Nigeria passes new legislation criminalizing the aiding and abetting as well as promotion of homosexuality, public displays of same-sex relationships, and belonging to homosexual groups. Those in a same-sex marriage or civil union may be sentenced to 14 years in prison and foreign partnerships are "void". People who register, operate, or participate in gay clubs, societies, and organizations or make public displays of affection as part of a same-sex relationship can be punished by up to 10 years in prison.
- February 4 — The Scottish Parliament approves a same-sex marriage bill.
- April 14 — In Malta, parliament approves a civil partnership bill.
- July 21 — United States President Barack Obama signs an executive order expanding employment protections for federal workers and contractors to include gender identity. This order also bans sexual orientation and gender identity discrimination for companies receiving federal contracts.
- August 1 — The Constitutional Court of Uganda invalidates the Anti-Homosexuality Bill due to too members of parliament being present to vote on the bill.
- October 9 — Estonia becomes the first former Soviet country to recognize same-sex partnerships. The law comes into effect in 2016.
- October 10 — Same-sex marriage becomes legal in North Carolina, and same-sex married couples in Virginia can now legally adopt.
- October 15 — Same-sex marriage becomes legal in Idaho.
- October 17 — Same-sex marriage becomes legal in Arizona after U.S. District Court Judge John W. Sedwick rules that state's ban is unconstitutional. Sedwick refuses to grant a stay on his opinion and State Attorney General Tom Horne chooses not to appeal.
- October 21 — Same-sex marriage becomes legal in Wyoming.
- December 17 — Same-sex marriage becomes legal in Scotland.

=== 2015 ===
- January 1 — Same-sex marriage becomes legal in Luxembourg.
- January 6 — Same-sex marriage becomes legal in Florida.
- March 3 — The Slovenian Parliament votes to legalize marriage for same-sex couples.
- June 12 — In the Mexican state of Chihuahua, Governor César Duarte Jáquez announces that his administration will no longer prevent same-sex couples from marrying.
- June 22 — Same-sex marriage becomes legal in the Pitcairn Islands.
- June 26 — Same-sex marriage is legalized in the United States of America following the 5–4 Supreme Court ruling Obergefell v. Hodges, which declares the refusal to grant marriage licenses to gay and lesbian couples unconstitutional.
- July 13 — The Pentagon announces that it will allow transgender personnel to serve openly in the US military, starting in 2016.
- October 22 — Civil unions become legal in become legal in Chile.
- November 17 — Ireland holds its first same-sex marriage .
- December 9 — Same-sex unions become legal in Cyprus.
- December 23 — The Greek Parliament approves a bill that recognizes civil unions between same-sex couples.

=== 2016 ===
- January 1 — Civil unions and step-child adoption by same-sex couples become legal in Estonia.
- January 20 — The Evangelical Church in the Rhineland votes to allow same-sex marriages in its churches.
- April 1 — Same-sex marriage becomes legal in Greenland. The first same-sex couples are married the same day.
- May 12 — Same-sex sexual activity is decriminalized in Nauru, and same-sex marriage becomes legal in the Mexican state of Jalisco following the Congress of Jalisco complying with the Mexican Supreme Court ruling by amending the state civil code.
- May 17 — Same-sex sexual activity is officially decriminalized in Seychelles.
- May 20 — Same-sex marriage becomes legal in the Mexican state of Campeche.
- July 1 — A bill banning the use of conversion therapy on the basis of sexual orientation and gender identity takes effect in the U.S. state of Vermont.
- July 8 — A bill that prohibits discrimination based on gender identity in public accommodations is signed into law by Massachusetts governor Charlie Baker.
- July 16 — The General Synod of the Anglican Church in Canada votes in favor of same-sex marriage.
- July 22 — Same-sex marriage becomes legal in the Isle of Man.
- August 10 — Same-sex sexual activity is officially decriminalized by high court decision in Belize.
- September 1 — Northern Ireland lifts its lifetime ban on gay men donating blood.
- October 1 — A policy that lifts the ban on openly transgender troops serving in the military goes into effect in the United States.
- October 13 — Same-sex marriage becomes legal in the British Antarctic Territory.
- December 15 — Same-sex marriage becomes legal in Gibraltar. The first same-sex marriage is performed the following day.

=== 2017 ===
- January 1 — Same-sex marriage becomes legal in Ascension Island.
- January 9 — The Constitutional Court of Peru rules that all same-sex marriages performed abroad must be recognized and registered as such in Peru.
- January 20 — Following the inauguration of Donald Trump as President of the United States, all mentions of LGBT rights are removed from the White House website.
- February 22 — The Trump administration withdraws guidelines for transgender students in public schools regarding the use of bathroom and facilities corresponding with their gender identity.
- March 1 — Same-sex marriage becomes legal in Finland, with the first weddings taking place the same week. Joint adoption becomes legal as well.
  - A law requiring all single-occupancy bathrooms to be gender-neutral goes into effect in California, the first state to adopt such legislation.
  - British Secretary of Education Justine Greening announces that Sex and Relationship Education will be made compulsory in all English schools by 2019.
- April 25 — The Danish Parliament ratifies legislation to legalize same-sex marriage in the Faroe Islands.
- May 2 — Same-sex marriage becomes legal in Guernsey.
- May 5 — Same-sex marriage becomes legal in Bermuda following a landmark supreme court case.
- July 16 — The Israeli government announces that gay couples will not be allowed to adopt in Israel.
- July 26 — Donald Trump announces a ban on transgender people serving in the United States military.
- August 4 — Same-sex marriage becomes legal in Tristan da Cunha.
- September 1 — Same-sex marriage becomes legal in Malta. A bill for legalization was passed by the Parliament on 12 July and signed by the President on 1 August.
- October 1 — Same-sex marriage becomes legal in Germany. A bill for legalization was passed by the Bundestag on 30 June, and by the Bundesrat on 7 July. It was signed by President Frank-Walter Steinmeier on 20 July.
- December 7 — Same-sex marriage becomes legal in Australia.
- December 11 — Despite US president Donald Trump's opposition, a federal judge rules that transgender people will be allowed to enlist in the United States military from January 1, 2018.
- December 12 — The Trump administration appeals the decision of December 11, requesting to stop transgender enlistment in the United States military.

=== 2018 ===
- April 12 — Trinidad and Tobago's High Court decriminalizes same-sex sexual activity.
- June 1 — Same-sex marriage is no longer legal in Bermuda.
- June 6 — The Supreme Court of Bermuda strikes down the ban on same-sex marriage five days after the ban goes into effect. A stay is implemented, allowing the Government time to respond.
- July 1 — Same-sex marriage becomes legal in Jersey.
- September 6 — The Indian Supreme Court decriminalizes homosexuality, striking down part of Section 377.
- November 15 — The parliament of San Marino allows civil unions and stepchild adoptions for homosexual couples.

=== 2019 ===
- January 1 — Same-sex marriage becomes legal in Austria.
- January 23 — Angola decriminalizes homosexuality.
- May 17 — Taiwan becomes the first state in Asia to legalize same-sex marriage.
- April 22 — The Madras high court grants marriage rights to transgender women under the Hindu Marriage Act, 1955.
- June 11 — Botswana decriminalizes homosexuality.
- June 13 — Same-sex marriage becomes legal in Ecuador.
- August 13 — The Tamil Nadu state of India becomes the first place in Asia to ban sex selective surgeries on intersex infants and children.
- October 22 — Legislation to recognize same-sex marriage in Northern Ireland is passed by parliament, taking effect after the 21 October deadline passed without a devolved Northern Ireland government being re-formed.

== See also ==
- Timeline of LGBT history – timeline of events from 12,000 BCE to present
- LGBT rights by country or territory – current legal status around the world
- LGBT social movements
- List of years in LGBT rights
