= O'Donnabhain v. Commissioner =

Case decided by the United States Tax Court

- Court: United States Tax Court
- Full case name: Rhiannon O'Donnabhain v. Commissioner of Internal Revenue
- Decided: February 2, 2010
- Citation: 134 T.C. 34

Court membership
- Judges sitting: Joseph H. Gale, John O. Colvin, Mary Ann Cohen, Michael B. Thornton, L. Paige Marvel, Robert Wherry, Elizabeth Crewson Paris, Richard T. Morrison, James Halpern, Mark V. Holmes, Joseph Robert Goeke, Maurice B. Foley, Thomas B. Wells, Juan F. Vasquez, Diane Kroupa, David Gustafson

Case opinions
- Majority: Gale, joined by Colvin, Cohen, Thornton, Marvel, Wherry, Paris, and Morrison
- Concurrence: Halpern
- Concurrence: Holmes
- Concurrence: Goeke, joined by Holmes
- Concur/dissent: Foley, joined by Wells, Vasquez, Kroupa, and Gustafson
- Concur/dissent: Gustafson, joined by Wells, Foley, Vasquez, and Kroupa

Laws applied
- Internal Revenue Code

Keywords
- Transgender; sex reassignment surgery

O'Donnabhain v. Commissioner 134 T.C. 34 (2010) is a case decided by the United States Tax Court. The issue for the court was whether a taxpayer who has been diagnosed with gender identity disorder can deduct sex reassignment surgery costs as necessary medical expenses under 26 U.S.C. § 213. The IRS argued that such surgery is cosmetic and not medically necessary. On February 2, 2010, the court ruled that O'Donnabhain should be allowed to deduct the costs of her treatment for gender-identity disorder, including sex-reassignment surgery and hormone treatments. In its decision, the court found the IRS position was "at best a superficial characterization of the circumstances" that is "thoroughly rebutted by the medical evidence".

== History ==
Rhiannon O'Donnabhain is a transgender woman who underwent sex reassignment surgery in 2001. She grew up in a devout Irish Catholic family in Boston and previously tried to conform to traditionally masculine roles, enrolling in the United States Coast Guard during the Vietnam War, working as a construction worker, marrying and fathering three children. Conflicted by gender identity issues, she divorced in 1992. In 1996, she was diagnosed with gender identity disorder, a condition recognized in the DSM-IV under which a person identifies as belonging to a different gender than the one usually corresponding to the sex they were assigned at birth, and feels significant discomfort or the inability to deal with this condition.

Under the supervision of her doctors and in accordance with the standard treatment regime, O'Donnabhain began taking hormonal therapy and came out to her family and coworkers as transgender. She changed her legal name and presented herself as female in her day-to-day life. In 2001, she completed her transition by undergoing sex reassignment surgery. After six weeks of recovery, she returned to work.

O'Donnabhain claimed a tax deduction for about $25,000 in costs related to her treatment. She initially received a full refund from the IRS, but after an audit, the IRS characterized her surgery as "cosmetic" and not "medically necessary", thus denying the deduction under 26 U.S.C. § 213(d)(9). The IRS demanded the refund back, and O'Donnabhain sued the IRS in Tax Court. Her case was taken by the Massachusetts-based Gay and Lesbian Advocates and Defenders (GLAD), the non-profit legal services organization that in 2003 won the Massachusetts Supreme Judicial Court case granting gay and lesbian couples the right to marry (Goodridge v. Department of Public Health).

On February 2, 2010, O'Donnabhain won in Tax Court in an 11 to 5 decision reversing the IRS decision. On November 2, 2011, the IRS announced that it intends to issue a formal agreement, known as a "notice of acquiescence", with the Tax Court decision.

== Arguments ==
26 U.S.C. § 213 allows taxpayers to deduct medical expenses, but not cosmetic surgery, which it defines as "any procedure which is directed at improving the patient's appearance and does not meaningfully promote the proper function of the body or prevent or treat illness or disease."

O'Donnabhain argued that her surgery was "medically necessary and directed toward the cure, mitigation and treatment of Ms. O'Donnabhain's diagnosed gender identity disorder."

The IRS issued a memorandum stating that:

Whether gender reassignment surgery is a treatment for an illness or disease is controversial. For instance, Johns Hopkins Hospital has closed its gender reassignment clinic and ceased performing these operations. ... In light of the Congressional emphasis on denying a deduction for procedures relating to appearance in all but a few circumstances and the controversy surrounding whether GRS is a treatment for an illness or disease, the materials submitted do not support a deduction.

In the clearest possible statement the US Tax Court declared "In its decision yesterday, the tax court said the IRS position was 'at best a superficial characterization of the circumstances' that is 'thoroughly rebutted by the medical evidence.'" The IRS case was based on unverified studies by Johns Hopkins' Paul R. McHugh, who worked for the Catholic Church. McHugh declared even before taking over the Johns Hopkins that it was his intention to close out any department that had anything to do with gender reassignment. He ordered a study of what he could find of the 24 women the unit had treated. Of 2,000 applications made by reassignment only 24 were chosen and they were chosen entirely for looks. Many questions remain about the religious bias of the IRS, as the results of the follow-up study were published in a Catholic journal the IRS would later use to close out deductions for surgery.
