= Judge Cohen =

Judge Cohen may refer to:

- Henry Cohen (judge) (1840–1912), acting judge of the Supreme Court of New South Wales
- Mark Howard Cohen (born 1955), judge of the United States District Court for the Northern District of Georgia
- Mary Ann Cohen (born 1943), judge of the United States Tax Court
- Mitchell Harry Cohen (1904–1991), judge of the United States District Court for the District of New Jersey

== See also ==
- Judge Cohn (disambiguation)
