= Nega =

Nega may refer to:

- Berhanu Nega (born 1958), mayor of Addis Ababa, Ethiopia
- Joseph W. Nega (born 1960), American judge
- Nega Mezlekia (born 1958), Ethiopian writer who writes in English
- Nega (album), a 1997 album by Maxim Fadeev
