= Elizabeth Paris =

Elizabeth Paris may refer to:

- Elizabeth Paris (Withchblade), fictional character
- Elizabeth Crewson Paris (born 1958), American judge
