= Thomas B. Wells =

American judge (born 1945)

Thomas Wells

Senior Judge of the United States Tax Court
- In office January 1, 2011 – December 31, 2022

Chief Judge of the United States Tax Court
- In office June 1, 2000 – May 31, 2004
- Preceded by: Mary Ann Cohen
- Succeeded by: Joel Gerber
- In office September 24, 1997 – November 6, 1997
- Preceded by: Mary Ann Cohen
- Succeeded by: Mary Ann Cohen

Judge of the United States Tax Court
- In office October 13, 1986 – January 1, 2011
- Appointed by: Ronald Reagan; George W. Bush (reappointment)
- Preceded by: Richard C. Wilbur
- Succeeded by: Joseph W. Nega

Personal details
- Born: Thomas Buell Wells; July 2, 1945 (age 80) Akron, Ohio, U.S.
- Education: Miami University (BS); Emory University (JD); New York University (LLM)

Thomas Buell Wells (born July 2, 1945) is an American lawyer who served as a judge of the United States Tax Court.

== Life and career ==
Wells was born in Akron, Ohio, and received a Bachelor of Science from Miami University of Ohio in 1967. He was a Supply Corps Officer on active duty in the U.S. Naval Reserve from 1967–1970, stationed in Morocco and Vietnam, and received a Joint Service Commendation Medal.

After leaving the military, Wells returned to school, earning a J.D. from Emory University Law School in 1973, and a Master of Laws in Taxation from New York University Law School in 1978.

Admitted to practice law in Georgia; member of law firm of Graham and Wells, P.C.; County Attorney for Toombs County, Georgia; City Attorney, Vidalia, Georgia, until 1977; member of law firm of Hurt, Richardson, Garner, Todd and Cadenhead, Atlanta, until 1981; law firm of Shearer and Wells, P.C., until 1986; member of American Bar Association, Section of Taxation; State Bar of Georgia, member of Board of Governors; Board of Editors, Georgia State Bar Journal; member Atlanta Bar Association; Editor of the Atlanta Lawyer; active in various tax organizations, such as Atlanta Tax Forum, presently, Honorary Member; Director, Atlanta Estate Planning Council; Director, North Atlanta Tax Council; American College of Tax Counsel, Honorary Fellow; Emory Law Alumni Association's Distinguished Alumnus Award, 2001; Life Member, National Eagle Scout Association, Eagle Scout, 1960. Member, Metropolitan Club; Chevy Chase Club, Vidalia Kiwanis Club, President, recipient Distinguished President Award.

Wells was appointed by President Ronald Reagan as a judge United States Tax Court on October 13, 1986 for a term ending October 12, 2001. He was reappointed by President George W. Bush on October 10, 2001 for a term ending October 9, 2016. He served as chief judge from September 24, 1997 to November 6, 1997 and from June 1, 2000 to May 31, 2004. He assumed senior status on January 1, 2011, and served until December 31, 2022.

Legal offices
Preceded by Richard C. Wilbur	Judge of the United States Tax Court; 1986–2011	Succeeded by Joseph W. Nega
Preceded by Mary Ann Cohen	Chief Judge of the United States Tax Court; 1997	Succeeded by Mary Ann Cohen
Preceded by Mary Ann Cohen	Chief Judge of the United States Tax Court; 2000–2004	Succeeded by Joel Gerber
