= Alina I. Marshall =

Romanian-American judge (born 1977)

Alina Marshall
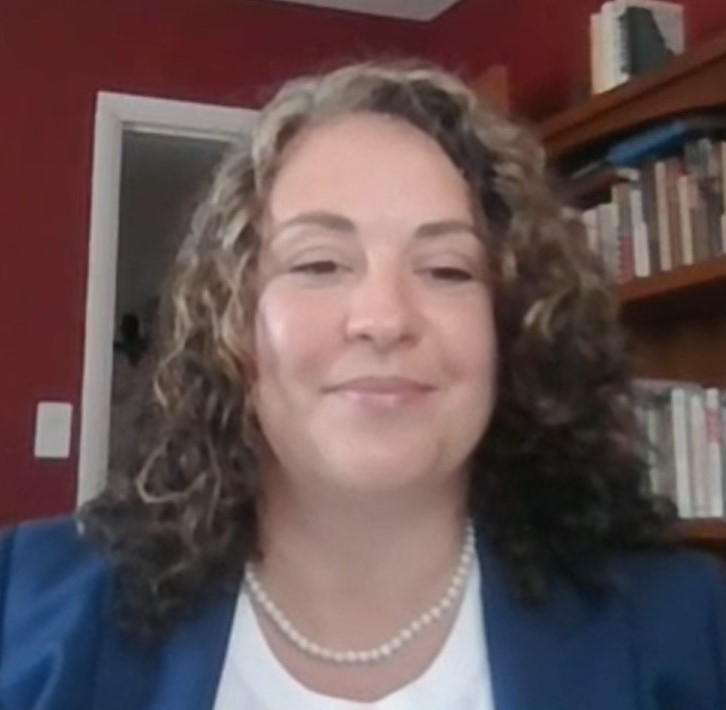
- Marshall in 2020

Judge of the United States Tax Court
- Incumbent
- Assumed office August 24, 2020
- Appointed by: Donald Trump
- Preceded by: L. Paige Marvel

Personal details
- Born: Alina Ionescu; 1977 (age 48–49) Bucharest, Romania
- Education: Yale University (BA); University of Pennsylvania (JD)

Alina Ionescu Marshall (born 1977) is an American lawyer who serves as a judge of the United States Tax Court.

== Education ==
Marshall earned her Bachelor of Arts, cum laude, from Yale University and her Juris Doctor, cum laude, from the University of Pennsylvania Law School, where she served as an Editor of the University of Pennsylvania Law Review and was inducted into the Order of the Coif.

== Career ==
Marshall practiced tax law at West & Feinberg and Freshfields Bruckhaus Deringer and served as a law clerk to a Judge of the United States Tax Court. Marshall has also served as an adjunct professor of law at Georgetown University Law Center in its Graduate Tax Program. Before becoming a judge, she was Counsel to the Chief Judge of the United States Tax Court.

== United States Tax Court service ==
On November 6, 2019, President Donald Trump announced his intent to nominate Marshall to serve as a judge of the United States Tax Court. On November 19, 2019, her nomination was sent to the Senate. President Trump nominated Marshall to the seat vacated by Judge L. Paige Marvel, who subsequently assumed senior status on December 6, 2019. On August 13, 2020, the United States Senate confirmed her nomination by voice vote. She was sworn into office on August 24, 2020.

Legal offices
Preceded by L. Paige Marvel	Judge of the United States Tax Court; 2020–present	Incumbent
