= Lawrence A. Wright =

American judge (1927–2000)

Judge of United States Tax Court
- In office 1984–1996
- Succeeded by: L. Paige Marvel

Personal details
- Born: December 25, 1927 Stratton, Maine
- Died: March 19, 2000 (aged 72) Georgetown University Hospital
- Spouse: Avis Leahy
- Children: 5
- Education: University of Maine (BA); Georgetown University Law Center (JD); Boston University School of Law (LLM)
- Occupation: Judge, Tax Commissioner, Trial Counsel

Military service
- Rank: Second Lieutenant (U.S. Army); Colonel (U.S. Army Reserve)

Lawrence Arthur Wright (December 25, 1927 – March 19, 2000) was a judge of the United States Tax Court from 1984 to 1996.

== Life and career ==
Born in Stratton, Maine, Wright served in the United States Army during World War II, from 1945 to 1948, achieving the rank of second lieutenant. He received a B.A. in government from the University of Maine in 1953, followed by a J.D. from Georgetown University Law Center in 1956, and an LL.M. in taxation from Boston University School of Law in 1962.

Wright practiced law with the firm of Gravel, Shea and Wright, Ltd., in Vermont, and served as tax commissioner for the State of Vermont from 1969 to 1971. He was senior trial counsel to the Chief Counsel's office of the Internal Revenue Service in Boston from 1958 to 1969. He also taught the State and Federal tax portion of the Vermont Bar Association bar review course, and served on several tax seminars as a panelist on both State and Federal tax matters. He retired from the U.S. Army Reserve in 1978 as a colonel in the Judge Advocate Branch. President Ronald Reagan nominated Wright to a seat on the Tax Court for a 15-year term beginning October 30, 1984.

Wright married Avis Leahy in 1953, with whom he had five sons, Michael, David, James, Stephen, and Douglas. He died from complications due to cancer at Georgetown University Hospital in Washington, D.C., at the age of 72.
