= Rose E. Jenkins =

American judge

Rose Jenkins
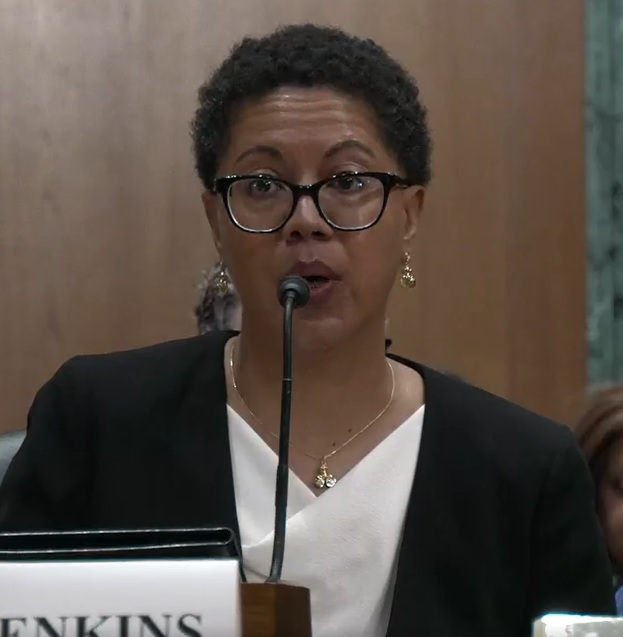

Judge of the United States Tax Court
- Incumbent
- Assumed office October 15, 2024
- Appointed by: Joe Biden
- Preceded by: Elizabeth Crewson Paris

Personal details
- Education: Stanford University (BA, MA); University of Texas, Austin (JD); New York University (LLM)

Rose Elena Jenkins is an American lawyer who is serving as a judge of the United States Tax Court.

== Education ==
Jenkins earned a Master of Arts and Bachelor of Arts from Stanford University, a Juris Doctor from the University of Texas School of Law and a Master of Laws from New York University Law School.

== Career ==
From 2008 to 2013, she was an associate at Skadden, Arps, Slate, Meagher & Flom. From 2013 to 2020, she worked at the IRS Office of Associate Chief Counsel (International), starting as an attorney, then senior counsel and finally a special counsel. From 2020 to 2021, she was a managing director in the international tax group within KPMG's Washington National Tax office and then as a senior attorney advisor at the Tax Law Center at New York University Law School. From 2023 to 2024, she served as an attorney in the Office of Associate Chief Counsel (Procedure & Administration) at the Internal Revenue Service.

=== Tax court service ===
On February 1, 2024, President Joe Biden nominated Jenkins to the seat vacated by Judge Elizabeth Crewson Paris, whose term expired on July 29, 2023. On June 4, 2024, a hearing on her nomination was held before the Senate Finance Committee. On June 13, 2024, her nomination was reported out of committee by a 25–2 vote. On September 19, 2024, the United States Senate invoked cloture on her nomination by a 76–15 vote. On September 23, 2024, her nomination was confirmed by a 69–17 vote. She was sworn in on October 15, 2024.

Legal offices
Preceded by Elizabeth Crewson Paris	Judge of the United States Tax Court; 2024–present	Incumbent
