= Jeffrey Arbeit =

American judge

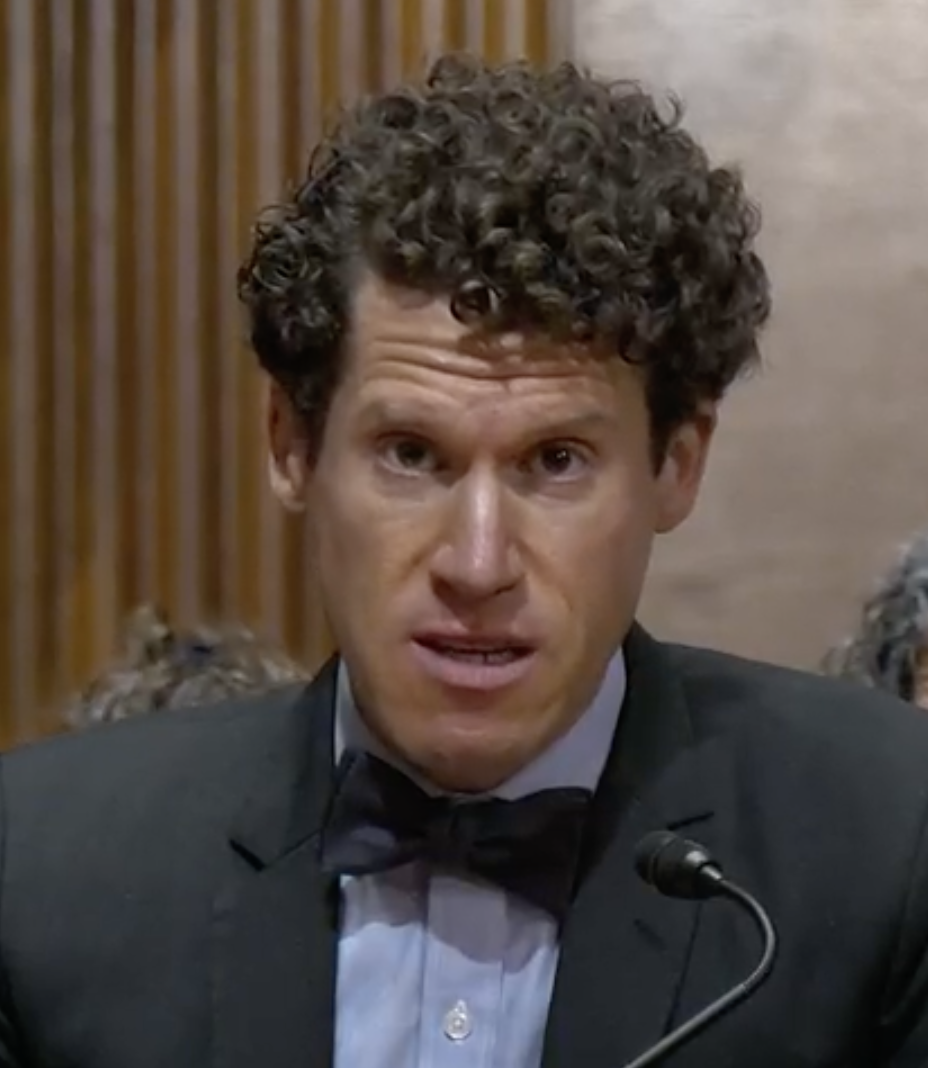

Judge of the United States Tax Court
- Incumbent
- Assumed office October 3, 2024
- Appointed by: Joe Biden
- Preceded by: Michael B. Thornton

Personal details
- Born: Jeffrey Samuel Arbeit
- Education: Brown University (BA); Boston University (JD); New York University (LLM)

Jeffrey Samuel Arbeit is an American lawyer who is serving as a judge of the United States Tax Court.

== Education ==
Arbeit earned a Bachelor of Arts in history from Brown University in 2005, a Juris Doctor from Boston University School of Law in 2008, where he served on the Boston University Law Review, and a Master of Laws in taxation from New York University School of Law in 2011, where he served on the Tax Law Review.

== Career ==
During his career, Arbeit clerked for Judge James Halpern of the United States Tax Court. He was a tax associate at Sullivan & Cromwell in New York. From 2015 to 2024, he served as a legislation counsel with the staff of the Joint Committee on Taxation. His work focuses primarily on international tax and issues related to financial assets, transactions, and markets.

=== Tax court service ===
On May 9, 2024, President Joe Biden nominated Arbeit to serve as a judge of the United States Tax Court. He was nominated to the seat vacated by Judge Michael B. Thornton, who assumed senior status on January 1, 2021. On July 10, 2024, a hearing on his nomination was held before the Senate Finance Committee. On July 25, 2024, his nomination was reported out of committee by a 27–0 vote. On September 25, 2024, the United States Senate confirmed him by a voice vote. He was sworn in on October 3, 2024.

Legal offices
Preceded by Michael B. Thornton	Judge of the United States Tax Court; 2024–present	Incumbent
