= 2015 in LGBTQ rights =

This is a list of notable events in the history of LGBTQ rights that took place in the year 2015.

== Events ==
=== January ===
- 1 – Same-sex marriage became legal in Luxembourg.
- 6 – Same-sex marriage became legal in the state of Florida.
- 12 – In the case Rosenbrahn v. Daugaard, U.S. District Court Judge Karen E. Schreier ruled that South Dakota's ban on same-sex marriage was unconstitutional.
- 14 – The Constitutional Court of Austria has ruled that same-sex couples have the same right as opposite-sex couples to adopt children.
- 18 – Irish Minister for Health Leo Varadkar comes out during an interview on morning radio, becoming the country's first openly gay government minister.
- 23 – In the case Searcy v. Strange, U.S. District Court Judge Callie V. S. Granade ruled that Alabama's ban on same-sex marriage was unconstitutional.

=== February ===
- 23 – Arkansas Governor Asa Hutchinson allowed a bill to become law that prevents any cities and counties in the state from expanding anti-discrimination ordinances beyond what the state already prohibits by refusing to sign or veto the legislation. The state's anti-discrimination laws do not include sexual orientation or gender identity.

=== March ===
- 2 – In Waters v. Ricketts, U.S. District Court Judge Joseph Bataillon ruled that Nebraska's ban on same-sex marriage was unconstitutional.
- 3 – The Parliament of Slovenia voted to legalize marriage for same-sex couples.
- 12 – Utah Governor Gary Herbert signed a bill into law that amends existing anti-discrimination laws for housing and employment to include sexual orientation and gender identity.

=== April ===
- 1 – Maltese parliament accepts the Gender Identity, Gender Expression and Sex Characteristics (GIGESC) Bill, bringing the country to the forefront of progressive gender legislation.
- 13 – Chilean President Michelle Bachelet signed a law that recognizes civil unions between same-sex couples.

=== May ===
- 12 – Voters in the city of Eureka Springs, Arkansas, upheld an ordinance that bans sexual orientation and gender identity discrimination in employment, housing, and public accommodations.
- 14 – The city council in Laramie, Wyoming, voted 7–2 in favor of a measure that bans sexual orientation and gender identity discrimination in employment, housing, and public accommodations.
- 23 – Voters in the Republic of Ireland approved an amendment to their constitution to legalize marriage for gay and lesbian couples. It is the first country in the world to legalize the practice by a popular vote.
- 26 – A unanimous vote by the Inatsisartut (Parliament of Greenland) ratified same-sex marriage.

=== June ===
- 5 – In the U.S. territory of Guam, U.S. District Court Chief Judge Frances M. Tydingco-Gatewood issued a ruling that found the territory's marriage law banning same-sex marriage was unconstitutional.
- 12 – In the Mexican state of Chihuahua, the governor César Duarte Jáquez announced that his administration would no longer prevent same-sex couples from marrying.
- 22 – Same-sex marriage became legal in the British Territory of the Pitcairn Islands.
- 26 – Same-sex marriage was legalized in the United States of America after the Supreme Court ruled that refusing to grant marriage licenses to gay and lesbian couples violates the Fourteenth Amendment to the United States Constitution.
- 29 – Homosexuality was officially decriminalized in the African country of Mozambique.
- 29 – At the 78th General Convention of the Episcopal Church, a resolution removing the definition of marriage as being between one man and one woman was passed by the House of Bishops with 129 in favor, 26 against, and 5 abstaining.
- 29 – After the Supreme Court legalized same-sex marriage nationally in the US, the office of the presiding bishop in Evangelical Lutheran Church in America released a letter informing members that each congregation is free to marry gay and lesbian couples or to choose not to do so.

=== July ===
- 13 – The Pentagon announced that it will allow transgender personnel to serve openly in the US military, starting in 2016.
- 21 – The European Court of Human Rights ruled that Italy is violating human rights because neither civil unions or same-sex marriages are legal in the country.

=== August ===
- 10 – Nepal starts issuing passports to transgender people; the holder's sex is marked as 'O' for other, rather than male or female.
- 11 – The Mexican Supreme Court ruled that a law banning adoption by same-sex couples in the state of Campeche is unconstitutional.

=== September ===
- 9 – The Gender Equality Act B.E. 2558 went in effect in Thailand, criminalizing discrimination based on gender and sexual orientation.
- 16
  - Argentina abolishes the ban on gay and bisexual men donating blood.
  - The Nepalese Constituent Assembly approved a new constitution that included several provisions pertaining to the rights of LGBT people.

=== October ===
- 22 – Civil unions became legal in Chile.
- 28 – The Dutch Health Minister announced that the Netherlands would lift the lifetime ban on gay and bisexual men donating blood to replace it with a 12-month deferral period.

=== November ===
- 4
  - The French Health Minister has announced that from spring 2016, gay and bisexual men will be able to donate blood following a one-year deferral.
  - The Constitutional Court of Colombia ruled 6–2 in favour of full adoption rights for same-sex couples.
- 12 – The Ukrainian parliament approved an anti-discrimination law banning discrimination based on sexual orientation or gender identity in the workplace.
- 17 – Ireland held its first same-sex marriage.

=== December ===
- 9 – Same-sex unions became legal in the Republic of Cyprus.
- 18 – The Portuguese Parliament approved a bill that would provide full adoption rights, but President Anibal Cavaco Silva, who leaves office on 9 March, rejected a bill that had been passed by the country's parliament
- 21 – The U.S. Food and Drug Administration approved a proposal to replace the indefinite deferral with the one-year deferral on gay and bisexual men donating blood.
- 23 – The Greek Parliament approved a bill that recognizes civil unions between same-sex couples.
