= Judge Cohn =

Judge Cohn may refer to:

- Avern Cohn (1924–2022), judge of the United States District Court for the Eastern District of Michigan
- James I. Cohn (born 1948), judge of the United States District Court for the Southern District of Florida

== See also ==
- Judge Cohen (disambiguation)
