= L. Paige Marvel =

American judge (born 1949)

Paige Marvel
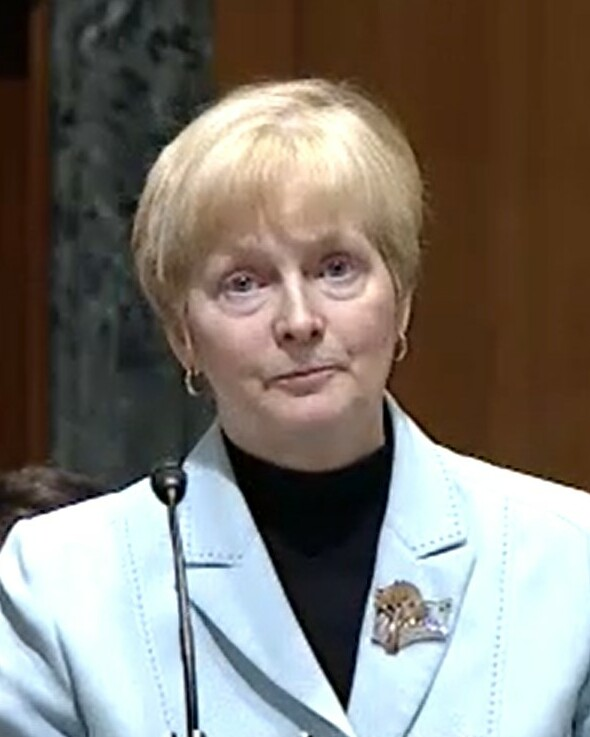
- Marvel in 2014

Senior Judge of the United States Tax Court
- Incumbent
- Assumed office December 6, 2019

Chief Judge of the United States Tax Court
- In office June 1, 2016 – May 31, 2018
- Preceded by: Michael B. Thornton
- Succeeded by: Maurice B. Foley

Judge of the United States Tax Court
- In office December 3, 2014 – December 6, 2019
- Appointed by: Barack Obama
- Preceded by: Herself
- Succeeded by: Alina I. Marshall
- In office April 6, 1998 – April 6, 2013
- Appointed by: Bill Clinton
- Preceded by: Lawrence Wright
- Succeeded by: Herself

Personal details
- Born: 1949 (age 76–77) Easton, Maryland, U.S.
- Education: College of Notre Dame of Maryland (BA); University of Maryland, Baltimore (JD)

Lynda Paige Marvel (born 1949) is an American lawyer who serves as a senior judge of the United States Tax Court.

== Early life and education ==
Marvel was born in Maryland and graduated magna cum laude from the College of Notre Dame of Maryland (now the Notre Dame of Maryland University) in 1971. She earned her J.D. with honors from the University of Maryland School of Law in 1974, where she was awarded Order of the Coif, a member of the Maryland Law Review and of the Moot Court Board.

== Judicial career ==
=== Tax Court ===
Marvel was appointed by President Bill Clinton as Judge, United States Tax Court, on April 6, 1998, for a term ending April 5, 2013. On April 6, 2013, Marvel took senior status. She was subsequently re-nominated to the position by President Barack Obama for an additional fifteen-year term on July 30, 2013. On January 15, 2014, Marvel testified before the Senate Finance Committee, "detailed her experiences during her first term as a Tax Court judge and said that if confirmed, she would continue to approach cases with an 'open mind and a commitment to justice.'" On February 4, 2014, the Senate Finance Committee "approved the nominations of Tamara W. Ashford and L. Paige Marvel to serve as U.S. Tax Court judges." On November 20, 2014, the United States Senate confirmed her by voice vote to a second 15-year term. She assumed office for a second term on December 3, 2014. She served as Chief Judge from June 1, 2016 to May 31, 2018. She took senior status on December 6, 2019.

== Professional career ==
- 1988-1998: Partner, Venable, Baetjer & Howard L.L.P.
- 1986-1988: Shareholder, Melnicove, Kaufman, Weiner, Smouse & Garbis
- 1985-1986: Shareholder, Garbis, Marvel & Junghans
- 1976-1985: Shareholder, Garbis & Schwait
- 1974-1976: Associate, Garbis & Schwait

== Awards and associations ==
=== Associations ===
- 1996-2003: Loyola/Notre Dame Library, Inc. Board of Trustees
- 1996-1998: Fellow and former Regent, American College of Tax Counsel
- 1996-1998: Board of Governors, Maryland State Bar Association
- 1995-2001: University of Maryland Law School Board of Visitors
- 1993-1995: Vice-Chair, ABA Section of Taxation, Committee Operations
- 1990-1998: Co-editor, Procedure Department, The Journal of Taxation
- 1989-1991: Member, Commissioner's Review Panel on IRS Integrity
- 1989-1992: ABA Council Director
- 1988-1990: Board of Governors, Maryland State Bar Association
- 1988-1998: Advisor, ALI Restatement of Law Third-The Law Governing Lawyers
- 1986–present: Advisory Committee, University of Baltimore Graduate Tax Program
- 1984-1990: Section Council, Federal Bar Association, Section of Taxation
- 1985-1987: Section Council, Federal Bar Association, Section of Taxation
- 1982-1983: Chair, Taxation Section
- 1981-1987: Member and Chair, Procedure Subcommittee, Commission to Revise the Annotated Code of Maryland (Tax Provisions)
- 1978-1981: Member, Advisory Commission to the Maryland State Department of Economic and Community Development

=== Awards ===
- 2002: 1st Annual Tax Excellence Award, Maryland State Bar Assn. Tax Section
- 1998: Maryland's Top 100 Women for 1998
- 1995: ABA Tax Section's Distinguished Service Award
- 1991-1998: Best Lawyers in America
- 1982-1983: MSBA Distinguished Service Award

Legal offices
Preceded by Lawrence Wright	Judge of the United States Tax Court; 1998–2013	Succeeded by Herself
Preceded by Herself	Judge of the United States Tax Court; 2014–2019	Succeeded by Alina I. Marshall
Preceded by Michael B. Thornton	Chief Judge of the United States Tax Court; 2016–2018	Succeeded by Maurice B. Foley
