= 2017 in LGBTQ rights =

This is a list of notable events in the history of LGBTQ rights that took place in the year 2017.

== Events ==
=== January ===
- 1 - Same-sex marriage becomes legal in Ascension island.
- 7 - A new Penal Code comes into effect in Peru after a governmental decree adding the terms sexual orientation and gender identity to existing hate crime and anti-discrimination laws is published in the official gazette.
- 9 - The Constitutional Court of Peru rules that all same-sex marriages performed abroad must be recognized and registered as such in Peru.
- 13 - The president of Finland signs a bill related to social benefits and health care that would finalize implementation of the same-sex marriage law that takes effect March 1, 2017.
- 16 - A lifetime blood ban is replaced by a one-year deferral period in the Republic of Ireland.
- 20 - Following the inauguration of Donald Trump as President of the United States, all mentions of LGBT rights are removed from the White House website.
- 30 - The Church of Norway votes to allow same-sex couples to have religious weddings in its churches by amending its marriage liturgy. Individual clergy members can still refuse to perform same-sex weddings, however.
- 31 - Switzerland lifts its lifetime ban on gay and bisexual men donating blood and stem cells, replacing it with a 12-month abstinence requirement.

=== February ===
- 7 - The Toledo City Council unanimously approves a ban on conversion therapy and makes gender identity a protected class in the city.
- 13 - Malaysia's official Islamic authority openly endorses gay conversion therapy after claiming that sexual orientation can be changed through extensive training.
- 17 - The Finnish Parliament votes 120–48 to kill legislation spurred by a citizen's initiative to rescind the new same-sex marriage law.
- 20 - The Indian Health Ministry releases resource material for adolescent peer educators assuring adolescents that feeling same-sex attraction is normal.
- 22 - The Trump administration withdraws guidelines for transgender students in public schools regarding the use bathroom and facilities corresponding with their gender identity.
- 24 - A law giving same-sex partnerships all rights of marriage except adoption and in vitro fertilization goes into effect in Slovenia.
- 28 - Two regions in the Philippines (Baguio and Dinagat Islands) introduce laws that promote equality and prohibit discrimination against individuals based on sexuality and gender.

=== March ===
- 1
  - Same-sex marriage becomes legal in Finland with the first weddings taking place the same week. Joint adoption becomes legal as well.
  - A law requiring all single-occupancy bathrooms to be gender-neutral goes into effect in California, the first state to adopt such legislation.
  - British Secretary of Education Justine Greening announces that Sex and Relationship Education (SRE) will be made compulsory in all English schools by 2019.
- 2 - New York City requires school staff to use transgender students' chosen pronouns.
- 6 - The US Supreme Court sends a case involving a transgender high school student in Virginia seeking to use school bathrooms that align with his gender identity back to a court of appeals.
- 20
  - The governor of Utah signs a bill repealing a law forbidding discussion of "promotion" or advocating of homosexuality in schools.
  - Voters in the Osage Nation tribe of northern Oklahoma approve an amendment to the tribe's legal code to allow its judiciary to issue marriage licenses to same-sex couples.
- 27 - The City Council of Columbus approves legislation to prohibit conversion therapy to alter the sexual orientation or gender identity of LGBT youth.
- 30 - The Legislative Assembly of the Falkland Islands approves the Marriage Amendment Bill by a vote of 7 to 1 to legalize same-sex marriage.

=== April ===
- 4 - The United States Court of Appeals for the Seventh Circuit rules in an 8–3 vote that the Civil Rights Act of 1964 prohibits employment discrimination on the basis of sexual orientation.
- 7 - New Mexico governor Susana Martinez signs SB 121, which prohibits the use of conversion therapy to alter sexual orientation or gender identity of LGBT youth, into law. New Mexico becomes the 7th state in the United States to ban the practice.
- 25 - The Danish Parliament ratifies legislation to legalize same-sex marriage in the Faroe Islands.

=== May ===
- 2 - Same-sex marriage becomes legal in Guernsey.
- 4 - Tennessee Republican governor Bill Haslam signs HB 1111/SB 1085 into law, seen as an attempt to challenge Obergefell v. Hodges.
- 5 - Same-sex marriage becomes legal in Bermuda following a landmark supreme court case.
- 10 - Connecticut governor Dannel P. Malloy signs HB 6695, banning the use of conversion therapy to alter sexual orientation or gender identity on LGBT youth.
- 11 - The Evangelical Church of the Palatinate votes to allow same-sex marriages in its churches.
- 17 - Nevada governor Brian Sandoval signs SB 201, which prohibits health professionals from using conversion therapy to alter the sexual orientation or gender identity of LGBT youth.
- 24 - The Supreme Court of Taiwan orders the Legislative Yuan to amend existing laws or create new laws within two years to legalize same-sex marriage in Taiwan. This was make Taiwan the first country in Asia to recognize same-sex marriage.

=== June ===
- The Evangelical Church in Berlin, Brandenburg and Silesian Upper Lusatia votes to allow same-sex marriages in its churches.
- 8 - The Scottish Episcopal Church votes to allow same-sex marriages in its churches.
- 12 - Leo Varadkar is elected Taoiseach of Ireland, becoming the youngest and first openly gay leader of Ireland.

=== July ===
- 16 - The Israeli government announces that gay couples will not be allowed to adopt in Israel.
- 26 - U.S. president Donald Trump announces a ban on transgender people serving in the United States military.

=== August ===
- 4 - Same-sex marriage becomes legal in Tristan da Cunha.

=== September ===
- 1 - Same-sex marriage becomes legal in Malta. A bill for legalisation was passed by the Parliament on 12 July 2017 and signed by the president on 1 August.
- 29 - The Botswana High Court rules that a transgender man has a constitutional right to change his listed gender with the Registrar of National Registration.

=== October ===
- 1 - Same-sex marriage becomes legal in Germany. A bill for legalisation was passed by the Bundestag on 30 June 2017, and by the Bundesrat on 7 July. It was signed by President Frank-Walter Steinmeier on 20 July.

=== November ===
- 15 - The results of the Australian Marriage Law Postal Survey are published. 61.6% of the voters vote in favor of legalizing same-sex marriages in Australia.
- 24 - The Evangelical Reformed Church in Germany votes to allow same-sex marriages in its churches .

=== December ===
- 5 - The Constitutional Court of Austria strikes down the ban on same-sex marriage as unconstitutional. Same-sex marriage is set to become legal in the country on 1 January 2019.
- 7 - Same-sex marriage officially becomes legal in Australia.
- 11 - Despite president Donald Trump's opposition, a federal judge rules that transgender people will be allowed to enlist in the United States military from 1 January 2018.
- 12 - The Trump administration turns to the D.C. Circuit Court of Appeals, requesting to stop transgender enlistment in the United States military.
- 18 - The Botswana high court ruled that a transgender woman should be allowed to change her registered gender, mirroring a similar case in September. On the same day, the government of Botswana decides not to appeal the September court ruling, and issues the transgender man in that case a new identity document.
