= Elizabeth Crewson Paris =

American judge (born 1958)

Elizabeth Paris

Senior Judge of the United States Tax Court
- Incumbent
- Assumed office July 29, 2023

Judge of the United States Tax Court
- In office July 30, 2008 – July 29, 2023
- Appointed by: George W. Bush
- Preceded by: Joel Gerber
- Succeeded by: Rose E. Jenkins

Personal details
- Born: January 14, 1958 (age 67); Altus, Oklahoma, U.S.
- Education: University of Tulsa (BS, JD); University of Denver (LLM)

Elizabeth Crewson Paris (born January 14, 1958) is a senior judge of the United States Tax Court. She was appointed by President George W. Bush in February 2008. Her nomination passed the United States Senate in July 2008, and she was sworn in on July 30, 2008. Her term expired on July 29, 2023.

Paris was born in Altus, Jackson County, Oklahoma. She is the older of two siblings, she was raised in Tulsa, Oklahoma, earning a bachelor's degree from the University of Tulsa in 1980, a Juris Doctor degree from the University of Tulsa College of Law in 1987, and a Master of Laws in taxation from the University of Denver in 1993. She is a former partner at Brumley Bishop and Paris, senior associate at McKenna and Cueno, and tax partner at Reinhart Boerner Van Deuren in the firm's Denver office. Paris served as Tax Counsel to the United States Senate Finance Committee from 2000 to 2008. She formerly taught in Georgetown University Law Center's LL.M. Taxation Program and the University of Tulsa College of Law.

Legal offices
Preceded by Joel Gerber	Judge of the United States Tax Court; 2008–2023	Succeeded by Rose E. Jenkins
