= 2019 in LGBTQ rights =

This is a list of notable events in the history of LGBTQ rights that took place in the year 2019.

== Events ==
=== January ===
- 1
  - Same-sex marriage becomes legal in Austria.
  - A law banning conversion therapy on minors in the U.S. state of New Hampshire takes effect.
  - A law banning hate speech based on "transgender identity or expression" takes effect in Sweden.
  - A law allowing third gender option ("diverse") on official documents takes effect in Germany.
  - A law allowing legal gender change without medical or psychological requirements, as well as third gender option ("X") on birth certificates takes effect in New York City.
- 23 - Angola decriminalizes homosexuality.
- 25 - New York Governor Andrew Cuomo signs a bill banning the use of conversion therapy on minors. The law takes effect immediately, making New York the 15th U.S. state to enact such a ban.

=== February ===
- New Jersey has become the second state in United States of America to require public schools to teach LGBT and disability-inclusive material.
- 15 - Health Minister of Germany, Jens Spahn, calls for a ban on conversion therapy.
- 17 - The French Parliament votes to replace the use of the words "mother" and "father" in official school forms with the terms "parent 1" and "parent 2". Supporters of the legislation say it aims to guarantee equal treatment for pupils with parents of the same sex.
- 19 - Same-sex marriage becomes legal in the Mexican state of Nuevo León, following a unanimous ruling by the National Supreme Court of Justice which struck down the state's ban on such marriages as unconstitutional.

=== March ===
- 8 - The Evangelical Church of the Augsburg Confession in Austria allowed blessings of same-sex marriages.
- 16 - The Reformed Church in Austria allowed blessings of same-sex marriages.
- 23 - The Evangelical-Lutheran Church in Württemberg allowed blessing of same-sex unions in Christian churches.
- 28 - Governor of Puerto Rico, Ricardo Rosselló, issues an executive order prohibiting mental health professionals from offering conversion therapy for minors.

=== April ===
- 23 - Madras High Court Justice GR Swaminathan directed Tamil Nadu Government to issue Government Order banning sex reassignment surgeries on intersex infants and children.

=== May ===
- 15 - The Evangelical-Lutheran Church of Hanover allowed blessings of same-sex marriages.
- 22 - The Evangelical Church of the Palatinate allowed blessings of same-sex marriages.
- 24 - Same-sex marriage becomes legal in Taiwan.

=== June ===
- 2 - San Marino bans discrimination based on sexual orientation by constitution. The motion passed with 71.46% of votes in a referendum.
- 7 - The decriminalization of homosexuality pass the lower house in Bhutan.
- 11 - Botswana's High Court unanimously decriminalizes homosexuality.
- 12 - High court in Ecuador allowed same-sex marriages in a ruling landmark decision.
- 13 - Brazil's Supreme Federal Court with a majority of 8 out of 11 judges voted in favour of making homophobia and transphobia crimes similar to racism.
- 14 - German reformed Church of Lippe allowed blessings of same-sex marriages.
- 21 - After receiving Royal Assent, the bill equalizing the age of consent in Canada came into force

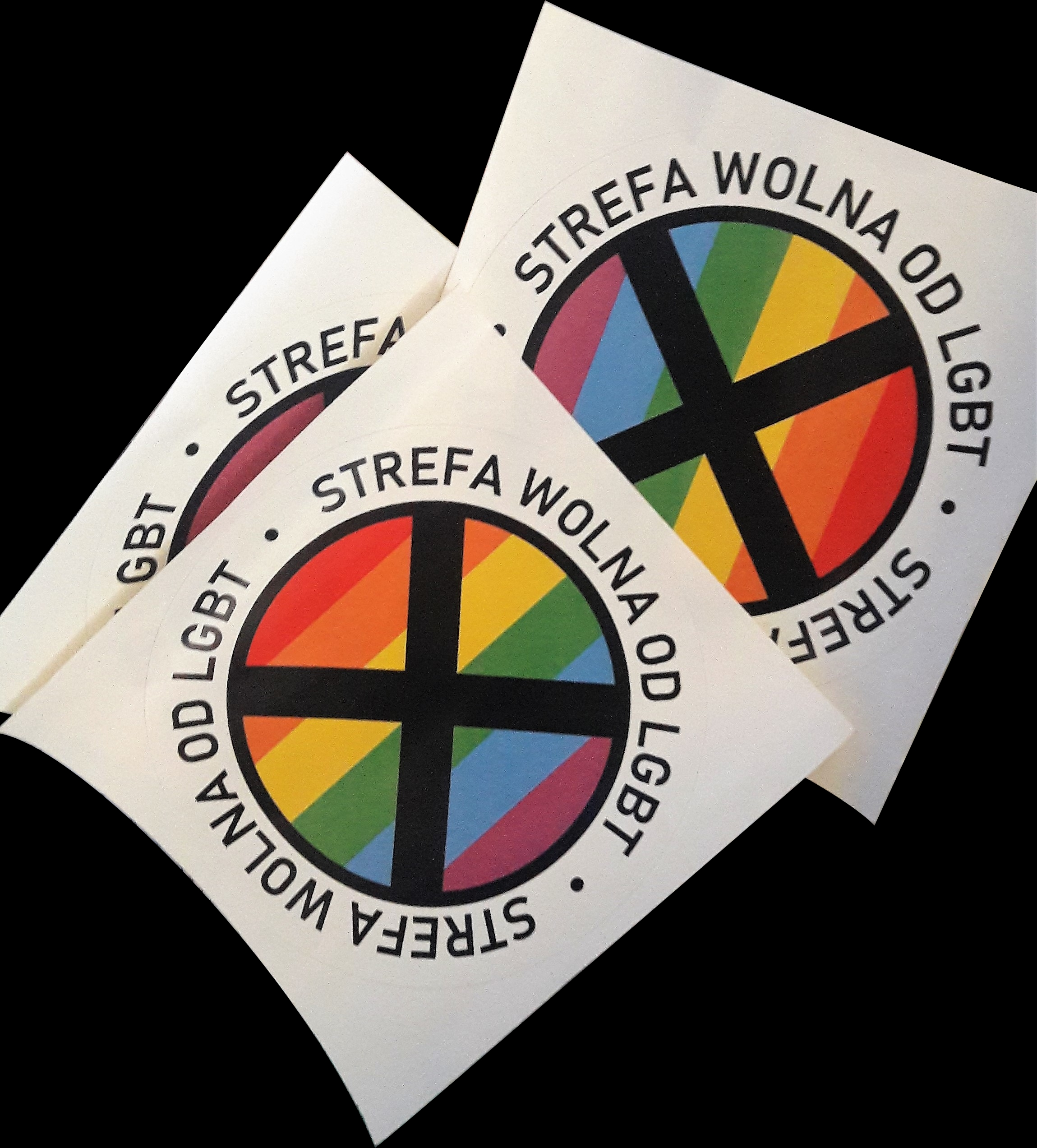
LGBT Free Zone stickers distributed by the Gazeta Polska newspaper in Poland

=== July ===
- 3 - UK Methodist Conference voted by 247 votes to 48 to allow same-sex marriages in UK Methodist Churches.
- 6 - In Iceland a law allowing self-determination gender change as well as third gender option came into effect.
- 9 - In UK House of Commons, MPs overwhelmingly voted 383–73 in favour of extending same-sex marriage to Northern Ireland. The clause will require secondary legislation, and will only come into force if a devolved Northern Ireland Assembly is not formed by 21 October.
- 20 July: Poland, Białystok equality march attacked by thousands of members of far-right groups, hooligan football fans, and others. The New York Times, compared the publish shock to the reaction to the Unite the Right rally in Charlottesville.
- 25 - Poland, Warsaw district court ordered that distribution of LGBT-free zone stickers should halt pending the resolution of a court case. However Gazeta Polska's editor dismissed the ruling saying it was "fake news" and censorship, and that the paper would continue distributing the stickers. Gazeta continued distribution of the stickers, but modified the decal to read "LGBT ideology-Free Zone".

=== August ===
- 8- The Evangelical Reformed Church of the canton of Zürich allowed bessing of same-sex marriages.
- 28 - Tamil Nadu became the first state in India to ban sex reassignment surgeries on intersex infants and children, with an exception of cases where it would be required to overcome life-threatening situations. Tamil Nadu Government passed a Government Order as per the Madras High Court directive.
- 29 - The Swiss Reformed Church allowed blessing of same-sex marriages.

=== September ===
- 18 - The Reformed Church of Aargau allowed blessings of same-sex marriages.
- 20 - The Evangelical Lutheran Church in Northern Germany allowed blessings of same-sex marriages.

=== October ===
- 22 - Legislation to recognize same-sex marriage in Northern Ireland passed by MPs at Westminster, taking effect after 21 October deadline passed without a devolved Northern Ireland government being re-formed.

=== November ===
- 9 - The Union of Evangelical Churches in Germany allowed blessings of same-sex marriages.
- 17 - The Union of Protestant Churches of Alsace and Lorraine allowed blessings of same-sex marriages.
- 20 - The Evangelical Church of Westphalia allowed blessings of same-sex marriages
- 29 - The Evangelical Church in Central Germany allowed blessings of same-sex marriages

=== December ===
- 13 - Gabon adopted a ban on homosexuality.
