= Joseph W. Nega =

American judge (born 1960)

Joseph Nega
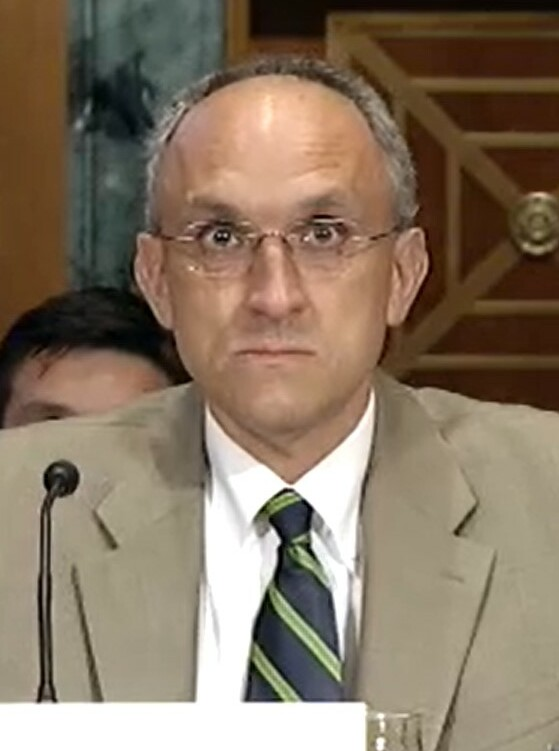
- Nega in 2013

Judge of the United States Tax Court
- Incumbent
- Assumed office September 4, 2013
- Appointed by: Barack Obama
- Preceded by: Thomas B. Wells

Personal details
- Born: Joseph Walter Nega; 1960 (age 65–66) Chicago, Illinois, U.S.
- Spouse: Cecily Wyatt Rock (m. 1989)
- Education: DePaul University (BS, JD); Georgetown University (LLM)

Joseph Walter Nega (born 1960) is an American lawyer who serves as a judge of the United States Tax Court. He formerly served as senior legislation counsel of the Joint Committee on Taxation of the United States Congress.

== Biography ==
Nega was born in 1960, in Chicago. He received a Bachelor of Science in Accounting from DePaul University. He received a Juris Doctor from DePaul University College of Law. He received a Master of Laws in Taxation from Georgetown University Law Center. He served on the Joint Committee on Taxation staff from 1985 to 2013, starting as a Legislation Attorney from 1985 to 1989. From 1989 to 2008, he served as Legislation Counsel to the committee. From 2008 to 2013, he served as Senior Legislation Counsel. His primary areas of responsibility were the individual income tax, tax exemption requirements for state and local bonds, tax credit bonds and employment taxes.

== Tax Court service ==
On May 9, 2013, President Barack Obama nominated Nega to serve a fifteen-year term as a Judge of the United States Tax Court, to the seat vacated by Judge Thomas B. Wells, who assumed senior status on January 1, 2011. His nomination was confirmed by the United States Senate on August 1, 2013. He received his commission on September 4, 2013. His commission will expire on September 3, 2028, at which time his fifteen-year term will end.

Legal offices
Preceded by Thomas B. Wells	Judge of the United States Tax Court; 2013–present	Incumbent
