= Richard C. Wilbur =

American judge (1936–2020)

Richard Carl Wilbur (July 1, 1936 – December 27, 2020) was a judge of the United States Tax Court from 1974 to 1986.

== Early life and education ==
Born in Otisville, New York, to Rosemary and Edwin R. Wilbur, Wilbur attended public schools in Otisville, graduated from Otisville High School in 1954, and received a B.S. from Manhattan College in 1958. While in college, Wilbur played on the school basketball team, where he was "an integral integral part of three postseason appearances for Manhattan", averaging 10.9 points and 6.5 rebounds per game in his senior year and serving as "a key member of Manhattan's 1958 NCAA Tournament run".

He received an LL.B. from Notre Dame Law School in 1962, where he was a staff member of the Notre Dame Lawyer, and a member of Gray's Inn and the Student Law Association. He also attended Harvard University's Kennedy School of Government for one year pursuant to a congressional staff fellowship awarded by the American Political Science Association.

== Career ==
Wilbur was a tax attorney in the IRS Office of Chief Counsel from 1962 to 1964. From 1965 to 1969, he was assistant minority counsel to the United States House Committee on Ways and Means, then served as minority counsel to that committee from 1969 to July 1974. During his service to the committee, he "worked on major legislation in the areas of Tax, Trade, Social Security, welfare reform, and enactment of Medicare and Medicaid". On June 7, 1974, President Richard Nixon nominated Wilbur to the United States Tax Court for a 15-year term. Wilbur retired from the Tax Court in 1986.

== Personal life and death ==
Wilbur married Joan Paterson in 1959, with whom he had two children, daughter Michelle and son Carl. He died at the end of 2020.
