= Michael B. Thornton =

American judge (born 1954)

Michael Thornton
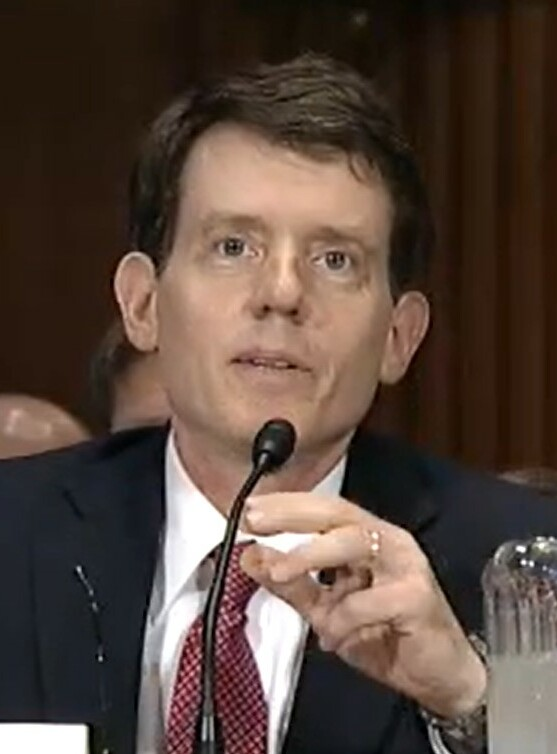
- Thornton in 2013

Senior Judge of the United States Tax Court
- Incumbent
- Assumed office January 1, 2021

Chief Judge of the United States Tax Court
- In office August 7, 2013 – May 31, 2016
- Preceded by: John O. Colvin (acting)
- Succeeded by: L. Paige Marvel
- In office June 1, 2012 – March 7, 2013
- Preceded by: John O. Colvin
- Succeeded by: John O. Colvin (acting)

Judge of the United States Tax Court
- In office August 7, 2013 – January 1, 2021
- Appointed by: Barack Obama
- Preceded by: Himself
- Succeeded by: Jeffrey Arbeit
- In office March 8, 1998 – March 7, 2013
- Appointed by: Bill Clinton
- Preceded by: Lapsley Hamblen
- Succeeded by: Himself

Personal details
- Born: Michael Bert Thornton; February 9, 1954 (age 71) Hattiesburg, Mississippi, U.S.
- Education: University of Southern Mississippi (BS, MS); University of Tennessee, Knoxville (MA); Duke University (JD)

Michael Bert Thornton (born February 9, 1954) is an American lawyer who serves as a senior judge of the United States Tax Court.

== Early life and education ==
Thornton was born on February 9, 1954, in Hattiesburg, Mississippi. He graduated summa cum laude from the University of Southern Mississippi with a Bachelor of Science in accounting in 1976. In 1977, he graduated from the same school with a Master of Science in accounting. In 1979, he graduated with a Master of Arts in English literature from the University of Tennessee. In 1982, he graduated with distinction with a Juris Doctor degree from Duke University School of Law, where he served on the Duke Law Journal, and was inducted into the Order of the Coif. He served as law clerk to Charles Clark, chief judge for the United States Court of Appeals for the Fifth Circuit from 1983 to 1984.

== Tax Court service ==
Thornton was appointed by President Bill Clinton as Judge of the United States Tax Court on March 8, 1998, for a fifteen-year term ending March 7, 2013. He has served as Chief Judge since 2012 (save for the period from March 8 through August 6, 2013). He was subsequently renominated by President Barack Obama on May 9, 2013, for an additional fifteen-year term, which was confirmed by the Senate on August 1, 2013. He assumed senior status on January 1, 2021.

== Accomplishments and employment ==
- Practiced law as an Associate attorney, Sutherland Asbill & Brennan, Washington, D.C., summer 1981, and 1982–1983
- Miller & Chevalier, Washington, D.C., 1985–1988
- Served as Tax Counsel, United States House Committee on Ways and Means, 1988–1993
- Chief Minority Tax Counsel, United States House Committee on Ways and Means, January 1995
- Attorney-Adviser, United States Department of the Treasury, February–April 1995
- Deputy Tax Legislative Counsel in the Office of Tax Policy, United States Department of the Treasury, April 1995 – February 1998
- Recipient of Treasury Secretary's Annual Award, United States Department of the Treasury, 1997
- Meritorious Service Award, United States Department of the Treasury, 1998

Legal offices
Preceded by Lapsley Hamblen	Judge of the United States Tax Court; 1998–2013	Succeeded by Himself
Preceded by John O. Colvin	Chief Judge of the United States Tax Court; 2012–2013	Succeeded by John O. Colvin; Acting
Preceded by Himself	Judge of the United States Tax Court; 2013–2021	Succeeded by Jeffrey Arbeit
Preceded by John O. Colvin; Acting	Chief Judge of the United States Tax Court; 2013–2016	Succeeded by L. Paige Marvel
