= 2018 in LGBTQ rights =

This is a list of notable events in the history of LGBTQ rights that took place in the year 2018.

== Events ==
=== January ===
- 10 - The Inter-American Court of Human Rights rules that Latin American governments have to allow same-sex marriages in their countries. The court decision sets a binding precedent in Barbados, Bolivia, Chile, Costa Rica, the Dominican Republic, Ecuador, El Salvador, Guatemala, Haiti, Honduras, Mexico, Nicaragua, Panama, Paraguay, Peru and Suriname.
- 29 – The Brazilian Federal Council of Medicine published a resolution prohibiting conversion therapies for transsexual and travesti people.

=== April ===
- 12 - Trinidad and Tobago's High Court decriminalizes same-sex sexual activity.
- 18 - The Evangelical Lutheran Church in Bavaria allows the blessing of same-sex marriages.
- 27 - The Evangelical Church of Hesse Electorate-Waldeck allows the blessing of same-sex marriages.

=== May ===
- 7 - The United Methodist Church (UMC) allows LGBT clergy and same-sex marriages in their churches.
- 9 - The General Synod of the Anglican Church in Aotearoa, New Zealand and Polynesia allows the blessing of same-sex marriages.
- 21 - The Church of Scotland votes in favour of drafting a new church law to allow same-sex marriages. The new laws would give ministers the option of performing same-sex marriages and a final vote is expected for 2021.

=== June ===
- 1 - The General Synod of Anglican Episcopal Church of Brazil votes to change its marriage canon to allow same-sex couples to get married.
- 1 - Same-sex marriage is no longer legal in Bermuda.
- 5 - The European Court of Justice (ECJ) rules that EU member states should recognise same-sex marriages for the purpose of residency if at least one partner is an EU citizen. Slovakia announces that they will comply with this ruling, recognising marriages performed abroad.
- 6 - The Supreme Court of Bermuda strikes down the ban on same-sex marriage, five days after the ban goes into effect. A stay is implemented, allowing the Government time to respond.
- 19 - Transgender identity no longer is classified as a mental disorder in the International Statistical Classification of Diseases and Related Health Problems (ICD). Now, instead, it is classified as a sexual health condition; this classification continues to enable healthcare systems to provide healthcare needs related to gender.
- 29 - A Sofia court allows a French-Australian same-sex couple the right to reside in Bulgaria.

=== July ===
- 1 - Same-sex marriage becomes legal in Jersey.
- 13 - The Assembly of the Uniting Church in Australia votes to create official marriage rites for same-sex couples.
- 18 - The Romanian Constitutional Court complies with the June ECJ ruling, and allows the main plaintiffs in the case the right to reside in Romania.
- 22 - The National Assembly of Cuba approves a draft constitution which recognizes same-sex marriage, though the proposal will need to go to a referendum at a later date in 2019.

=== August ===
- 9 - The Constitutional Chamber of the Supreme Court in Costa Rica declares Articles 14 and 242 of the Family Code, as well as Article 4 of the 2013 Law of Young People unconstitutional and gives the Legislative Assembly 18 months to amend the laws accordingly. If the Assembly does not comply, same-sex marriage will become legal automatically once that deadline passes.

=== September ===
- 6 - The Indian Supreme Court decriminalizes homosexuality, striking down the part of Section 377 that criminalized oral sex and anal sex.

=== November ===
- 15 - Parliament in San Marino allowed civil unions and stepchild adoptions for homosexual couples
- 22 - Evangelical Lutheran Church in Oldenburg allowed blessings of same-sex marriages in their churches.
- 29 - Protestant Church in Hesse and Nassau allowed blessings of same-sex marriages in their churches.
