= Tamara W. Ashford =

American judge (born 1968)

Tamara Ashford
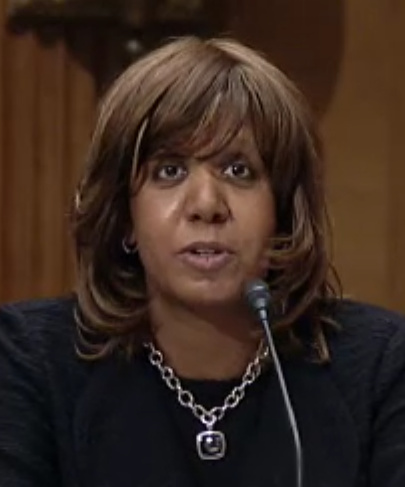

Judge of the United States Tax Court
- Incumbent
- Assumed office December 19, 2014
- Appointed by: Barack Obama
- Preceded by: Mary Cohen

United States Assistant Attorney General for the Tax Division
- Acting
- In office June 6, 2014 – December 19, 2014
- President: Barack Obama
- Preceded by: Kathryn Keneally
- Succeeded by: David Hubbert (acting)

Personal details
- Born: Tamara Wenda Ashford; 1968 (age 57–58) Boston, Massachusetts, U.S.
- Education: Duke University (BA); Vanderbilt University (JD); University of Miami (LLM)

Tamara Wenda Ashford (born 1968) is a judge of the United States Tax Court and formerly the deputy assistant attorney general for appellate and review in the Tax Division at the United States Department of Justice.

== Biography ==
Ashford received a Bachelor of Arts in public policy studies from Duke University, a Juris Doctor from Vanderbilt University Law School and a Master of Laws from University of Miami School of Law. She began her legal career as a law clerk to Judge John C. Martin of the North Carolina Court of Appeals. From 1997 to 2001, she served as an attorney with the Appellate Section of the Tax Division at the United States Department of Justice. From 2001 to 2004, she served as a senior associate at the law firm of Miller & Chevalier in Washington, D.C. From 2004 to 2007, she served as Assistant to the Commissioner of Internal Revenue. From 2008 to 2011, she served as a member of the Tax Controversy and Litigation Group at the law firm of Dewey & LeBoeuf LLP in Washington D.C. From 2011 to 2014, she served as the Deputy Assistant Attorney General for Appellate and Review in the Tax Division at the United States Department of Justice.

From June 16, 2014, to December 2014 she served as the Acting Assistant Attorney General for the Tax Division of the Department of Justice.

== United States Tax Court ==
On September 18, 2013, President Barack Obama nominated Ashford to be a Judge of the United States Tax Court for a term of fifteen years, to the seat vacated by Judge Mary Ann Cohen, who assumed senior status on October 1, 2012. On January 15, 2014, Ashford testified before the Senate Finance Committee "that through her past experiences she has "amassed the temperament and skills to be an independent arbiter," and that if confirmed, she would resolve tax controversies "fairly, impartially and expeditiously."" On February 4, 2014, her nomination was reported out of committee.

On November 20, 2014, the United States Senate confirmed her by voice vote. She assumed office on December 19, 2014.

Ashford is the first African-American woman judge to serve on the U.S. Tax Court

== See also ==
- United States Tax Court

Legal offices
Preceded by Mary Cohen	Judge of the United States Tax Court; 2014–present	Incumbent
