= 2013 in LGBTQ rights =

This is a list of notable events in the history of LGBTQ rights that took place in the year 2013.

== Events ==
=== January ===
- 1 - Same-sex marriage becomes legal in the U.S. state of Maryland.

=== February ===
- 2 - The National Assembly of France approves Article 1 of the same-sex marriage bill by a 249-to-97 vote.
- 5 - The Marriage (Same Sex Couples) Bill, which would legalize same-sex marriage for couples in England and Wales, passes 400–175 in the Second Reading in the House of Commons.
- 19:
  - In Austria, step-child adoption (of one's partner's biological child) becomes legal after ECtHR rules in favour of a lesbian couple.
  - In Germany, successive adoption becomes legal after the Constitutional Court rules in favor of a lesbian couple. Previously, only the adoption of the biological child of one's partner was allowed.

=== April ===
- 23 - The National Assembly of France legalizes, in a second voting, same-sex marriage and adoption.
- 29 - NBA free agent Jason Collins becomes the first active male professional athlete in North America to acknowledge his homosexuality in an article written for Sports Illustrated.

=== May ===
- 1 - Civil unions become legal in the U.S. state of Colorado.
- 14 - Brazil legalizes same-sex marriage after the National Council of Justice ruled that orders all civil registers of the country to license and perform same-sex marriages and convert any existing stable unions into marriages if the couples so desire. The ruling was published on May 15 and took effect on May 16, 2013.
- 17 - LGBT-rights activists gather in Tbilisi, Georgia, for the first anti-homophobic rally, despite large opposition.
- 30 - The Nigerian parliament passes a law banning same-sex marriage.
- 22 - Health Canada lifts ban on men who have sex with men donating blood with a deferral period of five years.
- 31 - Guy Erwin becomes the first openly gay bishop to be elected in the Evangelical Lutheran Church of America; he was elected to the Southwest California Synod of the ELCA.

=== June ===
- 19 - Exodus International, an organization devoted to the "re-orientation" of homosexual desires, shuts down.
- 25 - The Russian Parliament approves a ban on "gay propaganda" in two bills. The bill would impose jail terms for those who are deemed to be promoting homosexual "propaganda" to minors and for those who offend religious believers. At the same time, proponents staged a "kissing protests" while opponents attacked them.
- 26 - The Supreme Court of the United States ruled Section 3 of the Defense of Marriage Act unconstitutional in United States v. Windsor, requiring federal recognition of same-sex marriages performed in states. The also court dismisses an appeal in Hollingsworth v. Perry, effectively invalidating Proposition 8 and restoring same-sex marriage in California.
- 28 - The granting of same-sex marriages resumes in California.
- 30 - In Russia, President Vladimir Putin signs into law a bill banning "propaganda of nontraditional sexual relations to minors" after it was unanimously passed by the State Duma.

=== July ===
- 1 - Same-sex marriage becomes legal in the U.S. state of Delaware.

=== August ===
- 1 - Same-sex marriage becomes legal in the U.S. states of Rhode Island and Minnesota.
- 5 - Same-sex marriage becomes legal in Uruguay after it was passed on 10 May by the Chamber of Deputies of Uruguay with 71 affirmative votes out of 92 in its second reading, making Uruguay the second country in Latin America, after Argentina, and twelfth overall, to legalize same-sex marriage. The law was previously passed by the Senate on 2 April by a 23–8 vote.
- 19 - In New Zealand, same-sex marriage becomes legal after Royal Assent is granted by the Governor-General Jerry Mateparae, following its passing in a third reading in parliament of the Marriage (Definition of Marriage) Amendment Bill.
- 21 - In the U.S. state of New Mexico, Doña Ana County begins issuing same-sex marriage licenses.
- 23 - In the U.S. state of New Mexico, Santa Fe County begins issuing same-sex marriage licenses following an order by a state district court judge in Hanna v. Salazar.
- 27 - In the U.S. state of New Mexico, Bernalillo County begins issuing same-sex marriage licenses following an order by a state district court judge in Griego v. Oliver. San Miguel and Valencia counties also begin issuing same-sex marriage licenses. Taos County announces it will begin issuing same-sex marriage licenses the next day following an order by a state district court judge in Stark v. Martinez.

=== September ===
- 4 - In the U.S. state of New Mexico, Los Alamos County begins issuing same-sex marriage licenses following an order by a state district court judge in Newton v. Stover.
- 9 - In the U.S. state of New Mexico, Grant County begins issuing same-sex marriage licenses following an order by a state district court judge in Katz v. Zamarripa.

=== December ===
- - A trans woman was able to apply for the Tamil Nadu civil services exam after a court order allowed her to under a self-described gender choice category. Tamil Nadu is the first province of India to offer the option of gender choice instead of the ubiquitous "third gender".
- 4 - Xavier Bettel is appointed prime minister of Luxembourg, making him the third head of government in the world to be LGBT, after Iceland's Jóhanna Sigurðardóttir and Belgium's Elio Di Rupo, respectively. His deputy, Etienne Schneider, is also LGBT.
- 11 - The Supreme Court of India overrules the Delhi Court in re-establishing the primacy of section 377 of the Indian penal code that makes homosexual activity illegal.
- 12 - The High Court of Australia overrules the Australian Capital Territory's law allowing same-sex marriage in contravention of the Marriage Act saying the federal parliament alone could set such laws. The ruling annuls weddings that have taken place already.
- 17 - The Parliament of Uganda approves the Uganda Anti-Homosexuality Bill, which originally proposed the death penalty for homosexuality but now contains life in prison for "aggravated homosexuality." The bill must be signed by the President of Uganda before becoming law.
- 19 - The New Mexico Supreme Court ruled unanimously that the state must issue marriage licenses to couples without respect to gender.
- 20 - In Kitchen v. Herbert, U.S. District Judge Robert Shelby ruled that the Utah's ban on gay marriage violates the due process and equal protection under the 14th Amendment for gay and lesbian couples.
- 23 - In Obergefell v. Wymyslo, Federal Court Judge Timothy Black ruled that Ohio's ban on gay marriage is unconstitutional. However, his ruling only applies to death certificates.

== Deaths ==
- 8 January - Jeanne Manford, founder of Parents, Families, and Friends of Lesbians and Gays (PFLAG), unknown (declining health).

== See also ==
- Timeline of LGBTQ history – timeline of events from 12,000 BCE to present
- LGBTQ rights by country or territory – current legal status around the world
- LGBTQ social movements
