= Joel Gerber =

American judge (1940–2022)

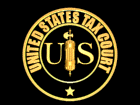

Joel Gerber (July 16, 1940 – March 4, 2022) was an American judge of the United States Tax Court.

Gerber received his B.S. in business administration from Roosevelt University in 1962 and his Juris Doctor from DePaul University in 1965. He then rose through the ranks in the U.S. Treasury Department, Internal Revenue Service, between 1965 and 1984, beginning as a trial attorney for the service in Boston, Massachusetts and working for various stints in Atlanta, Nashville, and Washington, D.C. Early in this tenure, in 1968, he also earned an LL.M. in Taxation from Boston University Law School and lectured in law at Vanderbilt University, 1976–80. Gerber would ultimately become Chief Counsel, Internal Revenue Service, from May 1983 to March 1984.

Gerber was appointed by President Ronald Reagan as Judge of the United States Tax Court, on June 18, 1984, for a term ending June 17, 1999. He served as Senior Judge on recall performing judicial duties until reappointed on December 15, 2000, for a term ending December 14, 2015. He was elected as Chief Judge for a two-year term effective June 1, 2004. Gerber stepped down as Chief Judge effective May 31, 2006, and assumed senior status. Gerber retired on July 16, 2020. He died on March 4, 2022, at the age of 81.

== Background ==
- Admitted to the Illinois Bar, 1965; Georgia Bar, 1974; Tennessee Bar, 1978.
- Recipient of a Presidential Meritorious Rank Award, 1983; Secretary of the Treasury's Exceptional Service Award, 1984.

== Attribution ==
Material on this page was copied from the website of the United States Tax Court, which is published by a United States government agency, and is therefore in the public domain.
