= Mary Ann Cohen =

American judge (born 1943)

Mary Cohen

Senior Judge of the United States Tax Court
- Incumbent
- Assumed office October 1, 2012
- In office September 23, 1997 – November 7, 1997

Chief Judge of the United States Tax Court
- In office November 7, 1997 – May 31, 2000
- Preceded by: Thomas B. Wells
- Succeeded by: Thomas B. Wells
- In office June 1, 1996 – September 23, 1997
- Preceded by: Lapsley Hamblen
- Succeeded by: Thomas B. Wells

Judge of the United States Tax Court
- In office November 7, 1997 – November 6, 2012
- Appointed by: Bill Clinton
- Preceded by: Herself
- Succeeded by: Tamara W. Ashford
- In office September 24, 1982 – September 23, 1997
- Appointed by: Ronald Reagan
- Preceded by: Cynthia Holcomb Hall
- Succeeded by: Herself

Personal details
- Born: Mary Ann Cohen; 1943 (age 82–83) Albuquerque, New Mexico, U.S.
- Education: University of California, Los Angeles (BS); University of Southern California (JD)

Mary Ann Cohen (born 1943 in Albuquerque, New Mexico) is an American lawyer who serves as a senior judge of the United States Tax Court.

== Biography ==
=== Early life ===
Cohen attended public schools in Los Angeles before earning a Bachelor of Science from the University of California at Los Angeles in 1964 and a Juris Doctor from the University of Southern California Law School in 1967. From 1959 to 1966 she served a bookkeeper and later secretary for two family-owned businesses in Los Angeles. From 1966 to 1967 she worked as a legal researcher for multiple lawyers based in Los Angeles. Cohen then practiced law in Los Angeles with the law firm of Abbott & Cohen from 1967 to 1982.

=== Judicial career ===
Cohen was appointed by Ronald Reagan as a judge of the United States Tax Court, on September 24, 1982, for a term ending September 23, 1997. She served as Chief Judge from June 1, 1996 to September 23, 1997, and was reappointed by Bill Clinton on November 7, 1997, for a term ending November 6, 2012. She served again as chief judge from November 7, 1997 to May 31, 2000. She took senior status on October 1, 2012. Barack Obama nominated Tamara W. Ashford of Virginia to the U.S. Senate for a fifteen-year term, to succeed her.

== Memberships and activities ==
- American Bar Association, Section of Taxation, and Continuing Legal Education activities.
- Received Dana Latham Memorial Award from Los Angeles County Bar Association Taxation Section, May 30, 1997
- Jules Ritholz Memorial Merit Award from ABA Tax Section Committee on Civil and Criminal Tax Penalties, 1999.

Legal offices
| Preceded by Cynthia Holcomb Hall | Judge of the United States Tax Court; 1982–1997 | Succeeded by Herself |
| Preceded by Lapsley Hamblen | Chief Judge of the United States Tax Court; 1996–1997 | Succeeded by Thomas B. Wells |
| Preceded by Herself | Judge of the United States Tax Court; 1997–2012 | Succeeded by Tamara W. Ashford |
| Preceded by Thomas B. Wells | Chief Judge of the United States Tax Court; 1997–2000 | Succeeded by Thomas B. Wells |
