= Blood donation restrictions on men who have sex with men =

Many countries have laws, regulations, or recommendations that effectively prohibit donations of blood or tissue for organ and corneal transplants from men who have sex with men (MSM), a classification irrespective of whether they identify themselves as bisexual or gay. Some prohibitions depend on the specific same-sex sexual practices or whether the sex takes place in a monogamous relationship, while others do not. Temporary restrictions are sometimes called "deferrals", since blood donors who are found ineligible may be found eligible at a later date. However, many deferrals are indefinite meaning that donations are not accepted at any point in the future, constituting a de facto ban.

Such prohibitions are generally in place due to the higher prevalence of HIV/AIDS among men who have sex with men. Since 1982, the risk for HIV infection transmitted via transfusion has been almost eliminated by the use of questionnaires to exclude donors at higher risk for HIV infection and performing screening tests with highly sensitive equipment to identify infected blood donations. According to the 2015 surveillance report by Canadian Blood Services, the risk of HIV transfusion-transmitted infection was fairly low: in 1 in 21.4 million donations. Contaminated blood put haemophiliacs at massive risk and severe mortality, increasing the risk of common surgical procedures. People who contracted HIV from a contaminated blood transfusion include Isaac Asimov, who received a blood transfusion following cardiac surgery.

== HIV/AIDS ==
In many high-income countries HIV is more prevalent among men who have sex with men (MSM) than among the general population.

In the United States the population most affected by HIV includes gay, bisexual, and other MSM. Of the 38,739 new HIV diagnoses in the US and dependent areas in 2017, 70% consisted of adult and adolescent gay and bisexual men. Although approximately 492,000 sexually active gay and bisexual men are at high risk for HIV, there are more tools to prevent HIV than ever before.

Proponents of the lifetime restriction defend it because of the asserted risk of false negative test results and because the MSM population in developed countries tends to have a higher prevalence of HIV/AIDS infection. The UK government advisory committee, SABTO, stated in 2013 that "the risk of transfusion of HIV infected blood would increase if MSM were allowed to donate blood". In July 2017 however, the UK government reduced the one year deferral window to three months, to take effect in the following months, resulting from SABTO's updated conclusions that "new testing systems were accurate and donors were good at complying with the rules". Furthermore, NHS Blood and Transplant are in the process of investigating how possible it is for MSM, depending on the degree of risk, to donate without even the three-month deferral. NHS has said that there is currently a limited amount of data on effective ways of conducting such risk assessments and that the initial steps of scoping, evidence gathering and testing will potentially take up to two years to complete.

== Current situation ==
Restrictions vary from country to country, and in some countries, the practice of protected sex or periods of abstinence are not considered. The restrictions affect these men and, in some cases, any female sex partners. They do not otherwise affect other women, including women who have sex with women. Meanwhile, for tissues such as corneas, the MSM deferral period is five years in the United States and 12 months in Canada.

=== List of countries with their stand on MSM blood donors ===
This list shows countries that had restrictions on blood donors. Most national standards require direct questioning regarding a man's sexual history, but the length of deferral varies.

Country	Deferral for MSM	Deferral for female sex partners of MSM	Ref.
Albania	No deferral	No deferral	
Argentina	No deferral	No deferral	
Australia	No deferral	No deferral	Since April 20, 2026 gay and bi men who are monogamous as a condition can donate blood without any deferred period - similar to the UK, USA and Canada. Gay and bi men not monogamous have an immediate minimal deferred period of 6 months. Since July 14, 2025 gay and bi men can donate plasma without any deferred period. Gay and bi men on any Prep medicine still have a 1-year deferred period.
Austria	No deferral	No deferral	A 1-year deferral was implemented following the publication of standardized donor history questionnaire in December 2019. Previously, there was an indefinite ban on donations. In December 2019 this was changed to a 4-month deferral period for blood donors. Since September 2022, the ban was lifted completely.
Belarus	No deferral	No deferral	No formal ban on blood donation by men who have sex with men exists in Belarus. However, informal restrictions and refusals have occurred, and it is recommended by the Ministry of Health of Belarus that men who have sex with men do not donate blood. Deceased homosexuals are forbidden from having their blood sampled as of 1993.
Belgium	4 months	No deferral	In June 2019, it was explicitly reported by the LGBT media, that the Red Cross banned transgender individuals from donating blood in Belgium. In July 2022, the restrictions changed from 1 year to 4 months.
Bhutan	No deferral	No deferral	
Bolivia	No deferral	No deferral	Since July 2019, the ban was lifted completely.
Brazil	No deferral	No deferral	
Canada	No deferral	No deferral	Since 11 September 2022, anyone who has had anal sex with a new partner in the last three months, regardless of their gender or their partner's gender, must wait three months before donating. In Quebec the ban on plasma donation has been lifted on 2 October 2022, and the ban on other donations was lifted on 4 December 2022.
Chile	No deferral	No deferral	
China	Indefinite	1 year	
Colombia	No deferral	No deferral	
Costa Rica	No deferral	No deferral	
Croatia	Indefinite	No deferral	
Cyprus	No deferral	No deferral	
Czech Republic	No deferral	No deferral	Beginning July 1, 2024, anyone who has had anal sex with a new partner or multiple partners is banned from donating blood for 4 months.
Denmark	No deferral	No deferral	In March 2020, Denmark implemented a policy that allows gay and bi men to donate blood after a 4-month deferral period. In July 2024, this deferral period was replaced with a deferral that does not discriminate between homosexual and heterosexual anal sex.
Estonia	No deferral	No deferral	Until 2018, Estonia didn't allow gay and bi men to donate blood. Between 2018 and 11 April 2022, Estonia implemented a policy that allowed gay and bi men to donate blood after a 12-month deferral period. Between 12 April 2022 and 29 February 2024, gay and bi men were allowed to donate after a 4-month deferral period. Since 1 March 2024, there is no deferral period for gay and bi men.
Finland	No deferral	No deferral	In December 2023, the deferral period was removed.
France	No deferral	No deferral	Between 1 February 2020, to 16 March 2022 France implemented a policy that allows gay and bi men to donate blood after a 4-month deferral period. Since 16 March 2022, there is no deferral period for gay and bi men within France to donate blood.
Germany	No deferral	No deferral	Since September 2021, gay and bisexual men are allowed to donate blood if they live in a permanent monogamous relationship. Sexual contact between men outside of such relationships will lead to exclusion for four months. Effective from 1 April 2023, the German ministry of health removed all remaining discriminatory blood donation policies for gay and bi men throughout Germany.
Greece	Indefinite	No deferral	In April 2025, the ban on gay and bi men donating blood was reinstated by the administrative courts within Greece.
Greenland	4 months	4 months	The policy implemented in Denmark proper also applies to Greenland (cf. The Office of the medical director of Health of Greenland). Transfusion Medicine Standards published by the Danish Society for Clinical Immunology applies.
Hong Kong	3 months	3 months	Anyone who has anal sex with a new partner or multiple partners, regardless of gender identity or sexual orientation, is deferred for three (3) months.
Hungary	No deferral	No deferral	12-month deferral scrapped in 2020.
Iceland	No deferral	No deferral	Ban on MSM blood donations lifted in September 2026.
India	Indefinite	No deferral	Court decision pending
Ireland	No deferral	No deferral	In January 2017 Ireland lifted the lifetime ban on blood donations from MSM who had ever engaged in oral or anal sex with another man, switching to 12-month deferral. This was further reduced to a 4-month deferral period in March 2022. Since 28 November 2022, all prospective donors, regardless of orientation or gender, are assessed individually and may donate if they have not engaged in anal sex with a new or multiple partners in the 4 months prior to donation.
Israel	No deferral	No deferral	Since 1 October 2021, Israel completely removed all restrictions on gay and bisexual men donating blood.
Italy	No deferral	No deferral	High-risk sexual contact is banned irrespective of the partner's sex. Any sexual activity with an occasional partner will result in a 4 months deferral period.
Japan	6 months	6 months	
Kosovo	Indefinite	Indefinite	Women who have sex with women also barred from donating blood.
Latvia	No deferral (Note: People of any sexual orientation involved in any kind of sexual activity are welcome to donate blood, if they are confident that their sexual behaviour is safe and does not expose them to sexually transmitted diseases by e.g. unprotected sex with non-trusted partners, regardless of sexual orientation.)	No deferral	
Lebanon	Indefinite	Indefinite	
Lithuania	No deferral	No deferral	Removed restrictions on 1 May 2022
Malaysia	Indefinite	Indefinite	
Malta	No deferral	No deferral	In September 2019, Malta implemented a 1-year deferral period for gay and bi men. Since September 2022, gay and bi men can legally donate blood within Malta under the same conditions as heterosexual people.
Mexico	No deferral	No deferral	
Netherlands	No deferral	No deferral	Since 1 September 2021, gay men within monogamous relationships are no longer subjected to the four-month waiting period. From January 2024, gay and bi men are allowed to donate blood under the same conditions as heterosexual people.
New Zealand	No deferral	No deferral	Since May 4, 2026 monogamous gay and bi men can donate blood legally within New Zealand with no deferral period - just like Australia, UK, Canada, and the USA (down from a 3-month deferral period implemented within 2020).
North Macedonia	Indefinite	Indefinite	MSM are not allowed to donate blood
Norway	1 year	6 months	The deferral period for gay men to donate blood was proposed to be lowered from 1 year to 6 months, but this was not implemented.
Panama	Indefinite	Indefinite	
Peru	No deferral	No deferral	
Philippines	Indefinite	No deferral	
Poland	No deferral	No deferral	
Portugal	No deferral	No deferral	
Romania	No deferral	No deferral	
Russia	No deferral	No deferral	
San Marino	No deferral	No deferral	
Serbia	No deferral	No deferral	Anyone who has unprotected anal sex, regardless of gender identity or sexual orientation, is deferred for six (6) months.
Singapore	Indefinite	3 months	
South Africa	No deferral	No deferral	
South Korea	No deferral	No deferral	
Slovakia	3 months	3 months	Anyone who has sexual intercourse with a new partner is deferred for 3 months, regardless of gender identity or sexual orientation.
Slovenia	No deferral	No deferral	
Spain	No deferral	No deferral	
Sri Lanka	Indefinite	Indefinite	
Sweden	6 months	6 months	Since 1 May 2021, Sweden lowered the deferral period from 1 year to 6 months.
Switzerland	No deferral	No deferral	On 1 November 2023, a 4-month deferral period for contact with new sexual partners (unified for homo- and heterosexuals) was implemented within Switzerland.
Taiwan	Indefinite	No deferral	In 2018, Taiwan proposed new regulations that would have allowed men who have sex with men to donate blood after a 5-year deferral period, starting tentatively in May that year. Those regulations were never fully approved, and in May 2019 the Ministry of Health and Welfare clarified that the rules had not changed.
Thailand	Indefinite	4 months	Anyone who has sexual intercourse with a new partner is deferred for 4 months, regardless of gender identity or sexual orientation.
Trinidad and Tobago	3 months	No deferral	According to the Ministry of Health's website, prospective donors who have had male-to-male sexual intercourse are deferred for three (3) months after their last intimate encounter.
Turkey	Indefinite	1 year	
Ukraine	No deferral	No deferral	
United Arab Emirates	Indefinite	Indefinite	
United Kingdom	No deferral	No deferral	Since 14 June 2021, Anyone who has had anal sex with a new partner or multiple partners in the last three months, regardless of their gender or their partner's gender, must wait three months before donating.
United States	No deferral	No deferral	Since August 2023, both the Food and Drug Administration and the American Red Cross implemented and went into effect - the blood donation policy of allowing gay and bi men "who are monogamous" as a condition without any waiting period. Prior to this during the height of the global COVID-19 pandemic, gay and bi men who wanted to donate blood required a 3-month deferred period.
Uruguay	No deferral	No deferral	
Venezuela	Indefinite (Note: Individuals are requested to fill a "Yes/No" questionnaire about their sexual life. Direct questions like "Have you ever had any sexual intercourse with someone from your same sex?" could appear.)	No deferral	

Blood donation policies for men who have sex with men -Men who have sex with men may donate blood; No deferral -Men who have sex with men may donate blood; Temporary deferral -Men who have sex with men may not donate blood; Permanent deferral -No Data

Blood donation policies for female sex partners of men who have sex with men -Female sex partners of men who have sex with men may donate blood; No deferral -Female sex partners of men who have sex with men may donate blood; Temporary deferral -Female sex partners of men who have sex with men may not donate blood; Permanent deferral -No Data

=== Europe ===
Several European countries do not have deferral policies for men who have sex with men (MSM). The donation is allowed if the donor has not had a risky sexual encounter, but not depending on the sexual orientation of the donor. For example, in Italy, the questionnaire item for sexual behaviour is symmetrical with respect to homosexual, heterosexual and bisexual intercourses and mentions them explicitly, as well as all points of sexual contact (oral, genital, anal), and does not mention usage of protection.

The UK since November 2017 has implemented a 3-month deferral policy on all gay/bi men who want to donate their blood. However, this did not apply to Northern Ireland until 2020. The Advisory Committee on the Safety of Blood, Tissues and Organs recommended the policy change after a study concluded that a total ban may breach equality legislation and that the risk of HIV reaching the blood supply would only increase by approximately 2%. In December 2020, it was announced that the UK would move to a personalised sexual behaviour risk assessment and scrap the deferral period specific to MSM.

In Ireland, MSM were historically subject to lifelong ban, until a change implemented in January 2017 that instituted a 12-month deferral policy. On 27 July 2015, Tomás Heneghan, a 23-year-old University of Limerick student, and journalist from Galway began a legal challenge in the High Court against the permanent deferral imposed on MSM donors. He argued that the questionnaire and interview process used by the IBTS does not adequately assess the risk of disease transmission posed by his donation. He claims this is in breach of EU law. He said that both failed to consider the length of time between a donor's last sexual experience and the end of a "window period" in which infections are sometimes not detected. Heneghan's previous sexual activity posed no risk of infection, according to HSE-approved advice and he said the service had no evidence upon which it could legitimately impose a life-long ban on him donating blood. Following several adjournments of the case to allow the blood service and Department of Health to examine and develop the donation policies, in late June 2016 the Irish Blood Transfusion Service recommended that the lifetime ban on MSM be reduced to a 12-month ban. Later that week the Minister for Health Simon Harris agreed to the recommendations and announced the reduction would take place. However, no timeline was reported for the implementation of the new policies.

On 26 July 2016, Tomás Heneghan dropped his High Court challenge against the service as an end to the lifetime deferral on MSM blood donors had been announced in the interim. Heneghan then wrote about his experiences of challenging the ban in a number of national media outlets. On 2 October 2016, it was reported that Minister Harris would implement the new policy from 16 January 2017, almost seven months after he announced the policy change. On 16 January 2017, Heneghan (now 25) attended a blood donation clinic in D'Olier Street, Dublin, and became the first man who has had sex with another man to donate blood openly in the Republic of Ireland since the lifetime deferral policy was first introduced in the 1980s. However, he also criticized the new 12-month deferral policy on MSM and called on Ireland's Health Minister to initiate a review of the IBTS and replace the 12-month deferral period for MSM with no deferral or a 3-month deferral on all donors following sexual intercourse.

On 20 May 2019, Heneghan (27) initiated a fresh legal challenge in the High Court against the blanket deferral on men who had had oral or anal sex with another man in the previous 12-month period.

Heneghan claims he cannot understand the reasoning behind the IBTS policy and argues that the questionnaire does not enable the IBTS to make a full evaluation of the level of risk presented by an individual donor due to their sexual behaviour. He also states that according to the IBTS's own website, there is a window period following infection during which HIV and hepatitis may not be detected in the blood and that this window is seven days for HIV and 16 days for hepatitis. He claims that a far less onerous restriction could be imposed rather than the 12-month deferral, which would protect blood recipients. He claims the decision to place an "automatic deferral" on him is unlawful and in breach of EU law and European communities regulations on the quality and safety of human blood products and that the policy is disproportionate, discriminates against homosexual and bisexual men, and breaches his constitutional rights and rights under the European Convention on Human Rights. The case is due to return to the court in July 2019.

In July 2019, a gay man in Ireland filed two formal complaints with the European Commission against the Department of Health and the Irish Blood Transfusion Service, and the Northern Ireland Blood Transfusion Service (the only part of the United Kingdom to maintain a 12-month deferral policy for MSM) over the MSM one-year deferral policy. The man, who has chosen to have his complaints examined by the Commission anonymously, is alleging the ban in both jurisdictions violates a number of European Union laws, including two European Union Directives covering the standards of quality and safety for the collection of blood by EU member states, as well as provisions contained in both the EU Charter of Fundamental Rights and the European Convention on Human Rights. The commission has informed the man his complaints will now be considered in light of EU law.

A similar policy exists in the rest of the European Union and is the prevailing interpretation of the European Union Directive 2004–33/EC article 2.1 on donor deferrals. The policy, however, is not very specific and refers to "high-risk sexual contact". The UK interprets the directive to include all forms of homosexual sex as falling within 2.2.2 of Annex III to the directive "Persons whose behaviour or activity places them at risk of acquiring infectious diseases that may be transmitted by blood", requiring a deferral based on the window period for the diseases involved, and sets this at 12 months, despite the Annex suggesting 6 months for risk of exposure to hepatitis B. Hélder Trindade, President of the Portuguese Institute of Blood and Transplantation (IPST), stated in 2015 that sexually abstinent homosexuals may give blood, but that MSM is definitely seen as a risk factor. On the 28th of November 2022, the Irish Blood Transfusion Service introduced Individual Donor Risk Assessments and removed sexuality from the eligibility criteria. All potential donors including MSM are now asked about new sexual partners, of any gender, and are eligible to donate if they have had no new partners in the previous 4 months.

In Finland, the parliamentary ombudsman launched an investigation on the possible unconstitutionality of the lifetime ban in January 2006. In June 2008, it was concluded that the ban was not unlawful in Finland as it is based on "appropriately reasoned epidemiological information" and because it is related to sexual behaviour rather than sexual orientation. The ombudsman added that people over the age of 65 and people who lived in Britain during the bovine spongiform encephalopathy (mad cow disease) outbreak are also screened out during blood donor interviews. In December 2013, the Finnish Red Cross blood service announced it was lifting the ban and introducing a one-year deferral instead. In 2021, the deferral period in Finland was reduced to 4 months.

In July 2016, France implemented a 1-year deferral period policy on all gay and bisexual men donating blood. Then the blood MSM deferral policy implemented in France was lowered to 4 months effective on 1 February 2020.

=== New Zealand ===
At the formation of the New Zealand Blood Service (NZBS) in 1998, the deferral period had been 10 years but was reduced to 5 years in 2009. This was following an independent review of blood donation criteria in 2007–2008 which found no significant difference in risk of the blood supply for a deferral period of 5 years compared to 10 years.

In 2014, the NZBS dropped the ban period from 5 years to 1 year following the recommendation of Medsafe. Their decision was mainly caused by new information about HIV transmission in Australia which already had a one-year deferral period. The 1-year deferral commenced 15 December 2014. On 14 December 2020 the NZBS reduced the deferral to 3 months.

The 3 month deferral period for MSM is on par with the 3-month deferral period for several other behavioural categories carrying a higher probability of unrecognized HIV infection, such as persons engaging in sex work and people who have resided in a country that has a high (1% or more) HIV prevalence.

=== United States ===
==== Current recommendations ====
In the United States, the Food and Drug Administration (FDA) issues non-binding guidance for deferral of blood donations, though they are universally followed.

In May 2023, the restrictions were updated to focus on behavior rather than sexual orientation or gender. People are ineligible to donate blood if they have:

- Had anal sex within the past 3 months and have a new or multiple sexual partners
- Ever tested positive for HIV or been treated for HIV with anti-retroviral therapy
- Taken any HIV prevention medication (PEP or PrEP; these can affect test results) by mouth within the past 3 months or by injection within the past 2 years
- Ever exchanged sex for payment or barter
- Used non-prescription injection drugs within the past 3 months
- Had sex within the past 3 months with someone who has ever tested positive for HIV
- Received an allogeneic blood transfusion or been exposed to blood of another individual (e.g. through a wound) within the past 3 months
- Gotten a tattoo or body piercing within the last 3 months, unless pierced with single-use equipment or tattooed in a state-approved shop with sterile needles and non-reused ink
- Been infected with or treated for syphilis or gonorrhea within the past 3 months
- Hemophilia or other clotting factor deficiency

UNOS policies for organ donation allow for solid organs from MSM donors such as hearts, lungs, and kidneys to be used in transplant surgeries, though they require the hospital receiving the organ to be notified if the donor was an MSM within the past 5 years. The organs are generally used unless there is a clear positive test for a disease.

Donors of human cells and tissues other than organs, such as corneas or reproductive tissue like semen, are ineligible for five years after the most recent contact. With regard to corneal donations, the five-year deferral policy in the United States and the similar 12-month deferral policy in Canada have the effect of preventing thousands of corneal donations annually.

==== History of FDA policy ====
- In 1983, two years after the discovery of HIV/AIDS in the United States, the FDA guidelines were changed to lifetime donation ban for men having had sex with a man since 1977. The argument used to follow these policies is that blood should be collected from a population that is at low risk for the disease since the tests are not perfect and human error may lead to infected units not being properly discarded, and these population groups would be considered high risk.
- In 2006, the AABB, American Red Cross, and America's Blood Centers all supported a change from the current US policy of a lifetime deferral of MSM to one year since most recent contact. One model suggested that this change would result in one additional case of HIV transmitted by transfusion every 32.8 years. The AABB has suggested making this change since 1997. The FDA did not accept the proposal and had concerns about the data used to produce the model, citing that additional risk to recipients was not justified.
- On 19 August 2009, the Assembly Judiciary Committee in California passed AJR13, the U.S. Blood Donor Nondiscrimination Resolution, calling upon the FDA to end the MSM blood ban.
- In April 2010, the New York City Council passed a resolution calling on the U.S. Food and Drug Administration (FDA) to eliminate the ban stating "This ban was based on prejudice, a knee-jerk reaction, and misunderstandings about the HIV/AIDS disease. Given the constant need for blood, it does not make common sense to prohibit donations from an entire population."
- On 1 June 2010, the Council of the District of Columbia passed a resolution calling on the FDA to "reverse the lifetime deferment of blood donations by men who have had sex with men since 1977 in favor of a policy that protects the safety and integrity of the blood supply that is based on up-to-date scientific criteria."
- In June 2013, the American Medical Association issued a statement calling on the FDA to change the policy, stating that "The lifetime ban on blood donation for men who have sex with men is discriminatory and not based on sound science."
- In July 2013, the American Osteopathic Association approved a policy calling on the FDA to "end the indefinite deferment period for Men who have sex with Men (MSM)", and to "modify the exclusion criteria for MSM to be consistent with deferrals for those judged to be at an increased risk of infection."
- On 21 December 2015, the U.S. Food and Drug Administration changed the policy by replacing the indefinite deferral with a 1-year deferral for MSM and women who have sex with MSM. The change was proposed the previous July.
- On 27 May 2016, the U.S. Food and Drug Administration approved of a new blood donor history questionnaire for general use by blood establishments, which is compatible with the deferral for 12 months. Before this update, the approved questionnaires were compatible only with an indefinite deferral of blood donations from MSM.
- As of December 2016, the American Red Cross reports that MSM may be eligible to donate blood if they did not have sex with another man in more than 12 months. The American Red Cross reports that, in January 2017, the organization began donor reinstatement of MSM who were previously deferred from donating, and who later became qualified to donate blood in accordance with the new donation deferral period of 12 months. The American Red Cross website specifies that this 12-month deferral does also apply to transgender men who have sex with men, but does not apply to transgender women who have sex with men.
- During the COVID-19 pandemic, a drop in blood donations prompted changing the 1-year deferral to 3 months after the most recent sexual contact for MSM.
- Current guidance was issued in May 2023.

=== Australia ===
Australia implemented a 12-month deferral in 1999; a comparison of confirmed HIV positive blood donations before and after the change did not see a statistically significant difference. The Australian Red Cross Blood Service pushed to have the deferral period lowered from twelve to six months, however it was rejected by the Therapeutic Goods Administration (TGA) in 2014. In April 2020 the TGA revised the deferral period for MSM down to three months. The revision requires approval of the federal, state and territory governments before it can go into effect.

Lifeblood's new 3-month deferral period rules went into effect on 31 January 2021. The spokesperson said they empathise with those who cannot give blood.

Since 2021, the deferral period within Australia was reduced from 12 to 3 months for MSM not using PrEP. MSM on PrEP maintain a 1-year deferral period, due to a more difficult detectability of any HIV.

More recently, since 2025, all genders and sexual identities, including anyone taking PrEP, can donate plasma without deferral. It is expected that in 2026, following approvals from the TGA, that Australia will implement the "individual risk based assessment" that allows any person who engages in anal sex monogamously for more than six months to donate blood. This timeline is dependent on Lifeblood working with the states and territories to enact the TGA approval.

== Reasoning for the restrictions ==
Blood services first and foremost must ensure that all blood received for donation is safe for transfusion purposes. This is achieved by screening potential donors for high risk behaviours through questionnaires and interviews before blood is taken, and subsequent laboratory testing on samples of donated blood.

Blood services commonly justify their bans against MSM due to the marginal increase in the risk for transfusion-transmitted HIV. Other groups with similar restrictions, or complete prohibition to donate blood, due to increased or possible risk for certain infectious diseases include intravenous drug users, recipients of animal organs or tissues, and those who have traveled or lived abroad in certain countries.

In the 1980s, when the HIV/AIDS epidemic outbreak occurred, there was a high prevalence of the disease in MSM and no reliable tests for the virus, which justified blanket bans on blood donations from high-risk groups.

These restrictions are similar to current restrictions on people with certain residence in the United Kingdom, France, or Saudi Arabia during the height of the BSE ("mad cow disease") epidemic of 1980 through 1996, due to the absence of a test for its human form, variant Creutzfeldt–Jakob disease (vCJD).

In 1985, early tests using the ELISA method looked for antibodies, which are the immune system's response to the virus. However, there is a window period when using this method in which a person who has been infected with HIV is able to spread the disease but may test negative for the virus. This window period can be as long as three to six months, with an average of 22 days. Tests using the ELISA methods are often still used in developed countries because of their ease-of-use, as well as their fairly high sensitivity, which boasts 100% sensitivity. To cover the window period resultant from the use of these tests, donors are also screened for high risk behaviours, one of which is a history of same-sex sexual activity among male potential donors. Newer tests look for the virus itself, such as the p24 antigen test, which looks for a part of the virus on the surface of infected cells, and nucleic acid tests (NAT), which look for the genetic material of the virus in HIV-infected cells. With these tests, the window period is shorter, with an average duration of 12 days. Fourth generation, or combination, HIV tests can detect HIV infection in 99% of individuals by one and a half months after infection.

Risks are also associated with a non-MSM donors testing positive for HIV, which can have major implications as the donor's last donation could have been given within the window period for testing and could have entered the blood supply, potentially infecting blood product recipients. An incident in 2003 in New Zealand saw a non-MSM donor testing positive for HIV and subsequently all blood products made with the donor's last blood donation had to be recalled. This included NZ$4 million worth of Factor VIII, a blood clotting factor used to treat hemophiliacs which is manufactured from large pools of donated plasma, and subsequently led to a nationwide shortage of Factor VIII and the deferral of non-emergency surgery on hemophiliac patients, costing the health sector millions of dollars more. Screening out those at high risk of blood borne diseases, including MSM, reduces the potential frequency and impact of such incidents.

== Criticism of the restrictions ==
=== Need for blood ===
Objections to the restrictions, including those from the American Medical Association and the American Red Cross, are generally based on the idea that improvements in testing and other safeguards have reduced the risk from transfusion transmitted HIV to an acceptable level. Blood shortages are common, and advocates for change to the policies point out that excluding healthy donors only makes the problem worse. In 2018, approximately 10,000 donations were still urgently needed by 10 March to continue to meet patients' needs. However, Canadian Blood Services noted that the national inventory and days on hand of several blood groups remain at critically low levels. Less than four per cent of eligible donors give blood each year.

=== Need for corneas ===
Corneal transplant surgery can cure blindness caused by corneal disease. However, there is a global shortage of corneal donations, severely limiting the availability of corneal transplants across most of the world. A 2016 study found that 12.7 million visually impaired people were in need of a corneal transplant, with only 1 cornea available for every 70 needed. Many countries have years-long waitlists for corneal transplant surgery due to the shortage of donated corneas. Even though there has never been a reported case of HIV transmission through corneal transplant surgery, and even though all donated corneas are screened for the presence of HIV through antibody or nucleic acid testing, many countries continue to ban MSM corneal donors.

=== Risk of STD transmission ===
In some European countries, high-risk sexual intercourses lead to a temporary ban, regardless of the sex of the partner. In fact, advocates for change in other countries note that the ban encompasses all same-sex sexual contact, even if the partner's HIV status is shown beyond doubt to be negative. Advocates for change point out that a promiscuous straight male is a higher-risk donor than a gay or bisexual man in a monogamous relationship, but the former will usually be allowed to donate blood. Furthermore, in some countries, other high-risk activities determine a temporary ban, such as sexual contact with anyone who has used needles to take drugs not prescribed by their doctor, whereas MSM donors are deferred indefinitely.

=== Roots in discrimination ===
Many LGBTQ organizations view the restrictions on donation as based on homophobia and not based on valid medical concern since donations are rigorously tested to rule out donors that are infected with known viruses such as HIV, hepatitis B, and hepatitis C. They state the deferrals are based on stereotypes.

== Activism regarding reform of MSM donor policies ==
Advocates worldwide for change to MSM prohibitions point out that screening of donors should focus on sexual behaviour as well as safe sex practices since many MSM may always have protected sex, be monogamous, or be in other low risk categories. Some groups in favor of lifting the restrictions support a waiting period after the blood is donated when the donor is considered to have had behaviour considered higher risk, and before it is used, to match the blood bank's window of testing methods. While HIV is reliably detected in 10 to 14 days with RNA testing, older testing methods provide accuracy for only up to 98% of positive cases after three months.

=== Advocacy and public response ===
In Canada

- The students association at Carleton University in Ottawa, Ontario, voted in 2012 to maintain a ban on blood clinics on campus.

In the United States

- In 2005, a student activist at the University of Vermont (UVM) filed a complaint with the university's Office of Affirmative Action, contending that American Red Cross blood drives on campus violated UVM's non-discrimination policy. The office recommended that the university no longer allow the Red Cross to conduct blood drives on campus, but the UVM administration rejected the recommendation, stating that it would not be in the interests of public health. Student and LGBT activism on the issue continued at UVM. In 2007, the UVM Student Government Associated voted down, by a 16–15 vote, a nonbinding resolution calling on the university to ban blood drives over the policy.
- In 2007, a group of Greek organizations at Iowa State University pulled their support for a blood drive, causing controversy.
- In 2008, San Jose State University President Don Kassing suspended all blood drives on campus on the ground that the MSM policy for blood donors violated the university's non-discrimination policy.
- In 2008, a faculty member at Sonoma State University proposed a resolution in the faculty senate to ban blood drives on campus, The faculty senate passed the resolution by a 21–13 vote, clashing with the student senate, which passed a resolution earlier the same month noting the discrimination, but expressing support for the monthly blood drives because of their importance.
- In 2010, an LGBT student group at Keene State College protested blood drives on their campus.
- In 2011, the academic senate of Queens College, City University of New York recommended that all blood drives on campus should cease.
- In 2013, a group of University of Michigan students favoring a loosening of the MSM blood-donation policy started a "Bleeding for Equality" initiative in which individuals ineligible to donate because of the policy would bring eligible individuals to donate on their behalf, so as to both promote blood donation and also demonstrate that the amount of additional blood that could potentially be collected if the policy changed. The Michigan Daily, the student newspaper of the University of Michigan, editorialized in favor of a loosening of the MSM blood donation policy.
- In 2017, the founder of Blood is Blood, a Buffalo-based MSM blood donation advocacy group, publicized a year-long celibacy pledge to satisfy the FDA's then-current 12-month MSM deferral period, donating blood in 2018 after completing it.
- In 2020, during the COVID-19 pandemic, gay Harvard physician Jack Turban told Vox and The Daily Show with Trevor Noah that after he recovered from COVID-19 infection that he wanted to donate plasma for clinical trials. He was unable to because of his sexual orientation. This resulted in 20 Attorneys General writing to the Department of Health and Human Services asking for the restrictions on MSM blood donations to be lifted.

In the United Kingdom

- The National Union of Students LGBT Campaign runs a "Donation Not Discrimination" campaign to have the blood ban changed, while also advocating continued donation by those who are not banned from donating.

=== United Kingdom ===
In 2015, Welsh writer and poet RJ Arkhipov exhibited a poetry series written with his own blood as ink in protest of the MSM blood donor restrictions. His poem Inkwell discusses the shame and stigma surrounding "gay blood". An abecedarian poem, each line of Inkwell's five quatrains begins with letters from each of the blood groups, alternating between A, B, AB and O.

=== Court cases ===
In 2018, the European Court of Human Rights took up a case of a French citizen who was prevented from donating blood.

== See also ==
- Gay sexual practices
- Terminology of homosexuality
