= Williams =

Williams may refer to:

== People ==
- Williams (surname), a surname English in origin, but popular in Wales, 3rd most common in the United Kingdom
- Williams Nwaneri, American football player

== Places ==
=== Astronomy ===
- Williams (lunar crater)
- Williams (Martian crater)

=== Australia ===
- Williams, Western Australia
- Shire of Williams
- Williams River (disambiguation)

=== Canada ===
- Williams Cone, a volcanic cone in British Columbia

=== United States ===
- Williams Gap, a mountain pass in Nebraska
- Williams River (disambiguation)

==== Communities ====
- Williams, Arizona
- Williams, California, in Colusa County
- Williams, Adams County, Indiana
- Williams, Lawrence County, Indiana
- Williams, Iowa
- Williams, Minnesota
- Williams, Nebraska
- Williams, Oregon
- Williams, South Carolina
- Williams County, North Dakota
- Williams County, Ohio
- Williams Township, Michigan
- Williams Township, Minnesota
- Williams Township, Dauphin County, Pennsylvania
- Williams Township, Northampton County, Pennsylvania
- Williams Bay, Wisconsin
- Williams Center, Ohio
- Williams Creek, Indiana

==== Facilities ====
- Williams Gateway Airport, Arizona
  - Williams Air Force Base, former U.S. Air Force base, a predecessor to Williams Gateway Airport
- Williams Tower, the third tallest skyscraper in Houston, Texas

==== Education ====
- Williams College, a liberal arts college in Williamstown, Massachusetts
- Williams Middle School (Florence, South Carolina)
- Williams Middle School (Moultrie, Georgia)
- Williams Middle School (Sturgis, South Dakota)

== Organizations and companies ==
- Williams Racing, a Formula One racing team
- Williams Holdings, a former UK conglomerate
- Williams Companies, an oil and gas pipeline company
- Williams International, a manufacturer of jet turbines
- Williams Electronics, a defunct gaming and amusement company; later known as WMS Industries
- Williams Electric Trains, a former independent model trains manufacturer, now owned by Bachmann Industries
- J.H. Williams Tool Group, a manufacturer of industrial tools

== Other uses ==
- Williams (film), a 2017 film
- Williams syndrome, a developmental disorder known for its distinctive "elfin" facial features
- Williams pear, a green pear cultivar, used also to produce a distilled brandy of the same name
- USS Williams, the name of various United States Navy ships

== See also ==
- William (disambiguation)
- Williamsburg (disambiguation)
- Williamson (disambiguation)
- Williamsport (disambiguation)
- Williamston (disambiguation)
- Williamstown (disambiguation)
- Williamsville (disambiguation)
- Justice Williams (disambiguation)
