= Battle of Quatre Bras order of battle =

1815 battle during the War of the Seventh Coalition order of battle

The following units and commanders fought in the Battle of Quatre Bras on 16 June 1815 at Quatre Bras in the Belgian region of Wallonia. The numbers following each unit are the approximate strengths of that unit.

== Anglo-allied army ==
=== Headquarters and support regiments ===
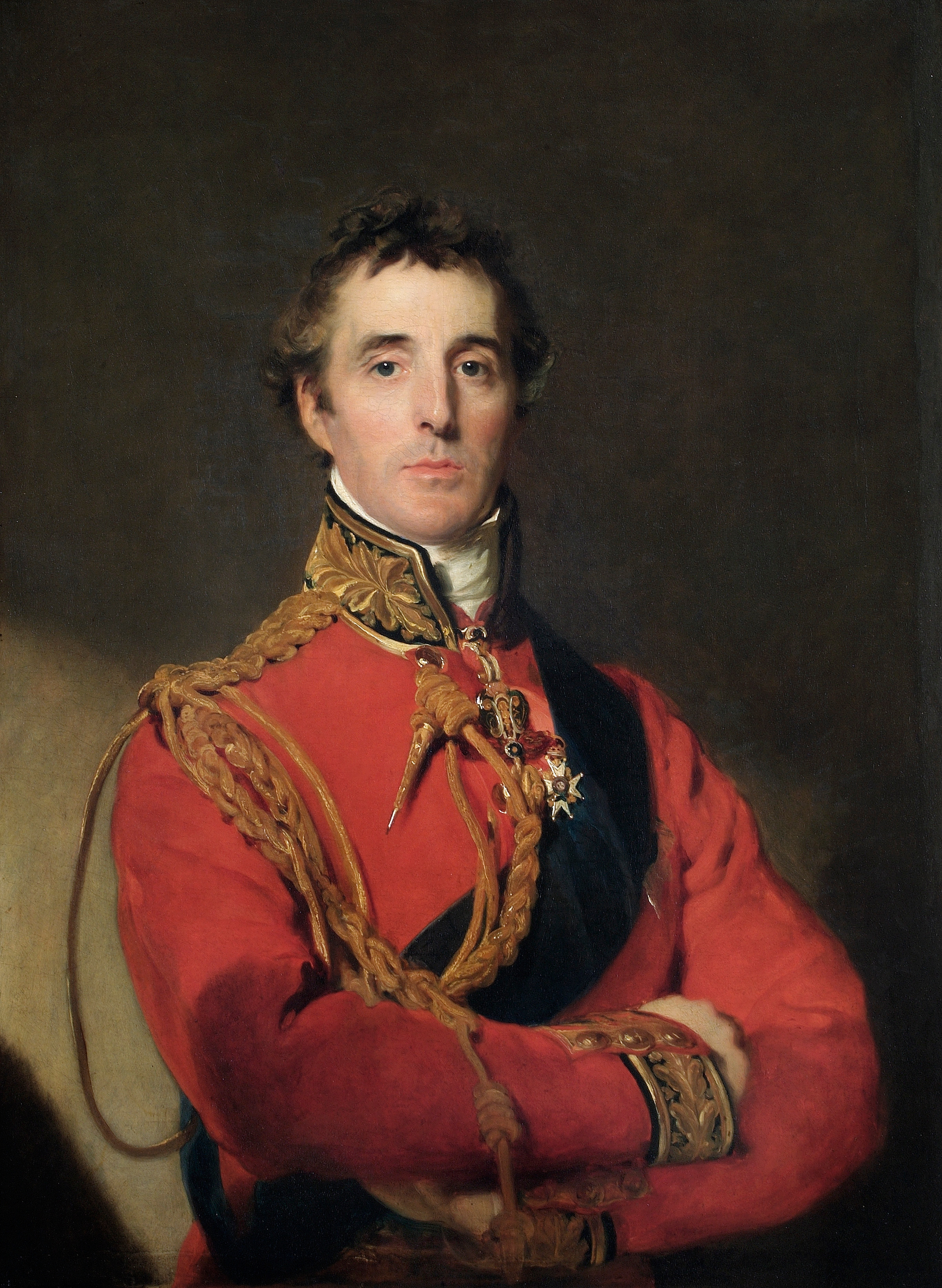
Arthur Wellesley, the Duke of Wellington

Field Marshal Arthur Wellesley, Duke of Wellington

Major General Prince Willem of Orange G.C.B.

Unit	Commander	Complement	Killed	Wounded	Missing
Headquarters	Field Marshal Sir Arthur Wellesley, 1st Duke of Wellington	150 off[icers] 1,231 men	0 off 0 men	2 off 0 men	0 off 0 men
Personal Staff	Colonel Sir William Howe De Lancey KCB	83 off 9 men	7 off 0 men	22 off 0 men	0 off 0 men
Medical Staff	Inspector Sir James Robert Grant M.D.	39 off 0 men	0 off 0 men	7 off 0 men	0 off 0 men
Artillery Corps	Colonel Sir George Adam Wood Kt	15 off 10 men	0 off 0 men	0 off 0 men	0 off 0 men
Royal Waggon Train	Lieutenant Colonel Thomas Aird	12 off 266 men	0 off 0 men	0 off 0 men	0 off 0 men
Royal Corps of Artillery Drivers	Major Neil Turner	13 off 1,212 men	0 off 0 men	0 off 0 men	0 off 0 men

=== I Corps ===
Unit	Commander	Complement	Killed	Wounded	Missing
I Corps	Major-General William, Prince of Orange G.C.B. (Prins Willem van Oranje)	798 off 17,325 men, 41 guns	13 off 214 men	46 off 1,266 men	1 off 224 men
Quarter-master-general	Major-General Jean Victor de Constant Rebecque	20 off 126 men	1 off 0 men	8 off 0 men	0 off 0 men
1st Division	Major-General George Cooke	175 off 4,155 men	5 off 45 men	9 off 507 men	0 off 0 men
1st Brigade	Major-General Peregrine Maitland	78 off 1,901 men	5 off 43 men	9 off 491 men	0 off 0 men
2nd Battalion, 1st Regiment of Foot Guards	Lieutenant Colonel Henry Askew	35 off 919 men	2 off 23 men	4 off 256 men	0 off 0 men
3rd Battalion, 1st Regiment of Foot Guards	Lieutenant Colonel William Stuart	40 off 982 men	2 off 20 men	5 off 235 men	0 off 0 men
2nd Brigade	Major-General Sir John Byng, 1st Earl of Strafford	79 off 1,939 men	0 off 0 men	0 off 7 men	0 off 0 men
2nd Battalion, Coldstream Regiment of Foot Guards	Lieutenant-Colonel James Macdonnell	36 off 896 men	0 off 0 men	0 off 0 men	0 off 0 men
2nd Battalion, 3rd Regiment of Foot Guards	Lieutenant Colonel Francis Hepburn	40 off 1,043 men	0 off 0 men	0 off 7 men	0 off 0 men
Artillery	Lieutenant-Colonel Stephen Galway Adye	14 off 401 men	0 off 2 men	0 off 9 men	0 off 0 man
Sandham's Battery Royal Artillery (RA)	Captain Charles Frederik Sandham	5 off 99 men, 5x9lb guns 1x5.5 inch Howitzer	0 off 2 men	0 off 9 men	0 off 0 man
Kuhlmann's Battery KGLHA, King's German Legion	Captain Heinrich Jacob Kuhlmann	8 off 302 men 5x9lb guns 1x5.5 inch Howitzer	0 off 0 men	0 off 0 men	0 off 0 men
3rd Division	Lieutenant-General Charles, Count Alten KCB (aka Charles Alten)	318 off 5,173 men	5 off 115 men	26 off 434 men	1 off 6 men
5th Brigade	Major-General Sir Colin Halkett K.C.B.	173 off 2,059 men	5 off 62 men	15 off 248 men	0 off 0 men
2nd Battalion, 30th (Cambridgeshire) Regiment of Foot	Lieutenant Colonel Alexander Hamilton	51 off 579 men	0 off 5 men	2 off 28 men	0 off 0 men
33rd (1st Yorkshire West Riding) Regiment of Foot	Lieutenant-Colonel William George Keith Elphinstone	41 off 514 men	3 off 16 men	7 off 67 men	0 off 0 men
69th (South Lincolnshire) Regiment of Foot	Lieutenant-Colonel Charles Morice	38 off 495 men	1 off 37 men	3 off 109 men	0 off 0 men
2nd Battalion, 73rd Regiment of Foot	Lieutenant-Colonel William George Harris	39 off 471 men	1 off 4 men	3 off 44 men	0 off 0 men
1st Hanoverian Brigade	Major-General Friedrich von Kielmansegg	127 off 3,189 men	0 off 44 men	10 off 169 men	1 off 6 men
Field Battalion Bremen	Lieutenant Colonel Wilhelm von Langrehre	21 off 512 men	0 off 5 men	1 off 13 men	0 off 0 men
Field Battalion 1st Duke of York's Osnabrück	Carl Friedrich von Bulow	25 off 607 men	0 off 20 men	2 off 22 men	0 off 4 men
Light Battalion Grubenhagen	Lieutenant Colonel Baron Friedrich von Wurmb	22 off 621 men	0 off 5 men	4 off 74 men	0 off 0 men
Light Battalion Lüneburg	Lieutenant Colonel August von Klencke	22 off 595 men	0 off 11 men	3 off 42 men	1 off 2 men
Field Battalion Verden	Major Julius von Schkopp	26 off 533 men	0 off 0 men	0 off 0 men	0 off 0 men
Field Jaeger Battalion (two companies)	Captain de Reden	10 off 321 men	0 off 3 men	0 off 18 men	0 off 0 men
3rd Division Artillery	Lieutenant Colonel John Suther Williamson	13 off 225 men	0 off 9 men	0 off 17 men	0 off 0 men
Lloyd's Battery RA	Major William Lloyd	5 off 93 men, 5x9lb guns 1x5.5 inch Howitzer	0 off 7 men	0 off 8 men	0 off 0 man
Cleeves' Battery KGLFA King's German Legion	Captain Andreas Cleeves	6 off 132 men, 5x9lb guns 1x5.5 inch Howitzer	0 off 2 men	0 off 9 men	0 off 0 man
2nd Netherlands Division (2e Divisie) (Note: De Bas and Wommersom, Tome III, table p. 96)	Lieutenant-Generaal Baron Hendrik George de Perponcher Sedlnitsky; Chief of Staff colonel Pieter Hendrik van Zuylen van Nijevelt	290 off 7,697 men	3 off 54 men	11 off 325 men	0 off 218 men
1st Brigade (1e Brigade)	Generaal-Majoor Willem Frederik van Bylandt	121 off 3,216 men	2 off 35 men	6 off 181 men	0 off 185 men
27th Light Battalion (Bataljon Jagers No. 27)	Lieutenant-Kolonel Johann Willem Grunebosch	23 off 739 men	0 off 3 men	1 off 62 men	0 off 33 men
7th Line Battalion (Bataljon Infanterie van linie No. 7)	Lieutenant-Kolonel Frederik Charles van den Sande	23 off 666 men	1 off 6 men	1 off 32 men	0 off 34 men
5th National Militia Battalion (Bataljon Nationale Militie No. 5)	Lieutenant-Kolonel Jan Johannes Westenberg	22 off 454 men	1 off 14 men	2 off 42 men	0 off 17 men
7th National Militia Battalion (Bat. Nat. Mil. No. 7)	Lieutenant-Kolonel Hendrick Singendonck	22 off 622 men	0 off 2 men	1 off 13 men	0 off 77 men
8th National Militia Battalion (Bat. Nat. Mil. No. 8)	Lieutenant-Kolonel Wijlbrandis Augustus de Jongh	22 off 502 men	0 off 6 men	1 off 27 men	0 off 23 men
Foot Artillery Battery (Batterij artillerie te voet)	Kapitein Emmanuel Joseph Stevenart	3 off 107 men 6x6 pdr gun, 2x24 pdr how	0 off 4 men	0 off 5 men	0 off 1 men
Train (Trein)	Lieutenant Frederik Van Gahlen	2 off 126 men	0 off 0 men	0 off 0 men	0 off 0 men
2nd Brigade (2e Brigade)	Kolonel F. von Gödecke (Note: According to De Bas and Wommersom, Prince Bernhard of Saxe-Weimar-Eisenach was the colonel of the 28th regiment "Orange-Nassau," but he had to replace the commander of the second brigade, Colonel Von Goedecke (Gödecke), who had been taken ill; Cf. De Bas and Wommersom, Tome III, p. 97, table and fn. 3.)	146 off 4,579 men	2 off 36 men	9 off 240 men	0 off 64 men
2nd Nassau Infantry Regiment (2. Infanterieregiment von Nassau)	Majoor Johann Friedrich Sattler	86 off 2,585 men	1 off 12 men	4 off 91 men	0 off 9 men
1st Battalion (1e Bataljon)	Kapitein Moritz Büsgen	27 off 835 men	0 off 5 men	1 off 31 men	0 off 9 men
2nd Battalion (2e Bataljon)	Majoor Philipp von Normann	25 off 819 men	1 off 4 men	2 off 27 men	0 off 0 men
3rd Battalion (3e Bataljon)	Majoor Gottfried Hechmann	27 off 819 men	0 off 3 men	1 off 33 men	0 off 0 men
28th Regiment, Orange-Nassau (Regiment Oranje-Nassau No. 28)	Kolonel Bernhard of Saxe-Weimar-Eisenach	57 off 1,625 men	0 off 5 men	0 off 35 men	0 off 22 men
1st Battalion (1e Bataljon)	Lieutenant-Kolonel Wilhelm Ferdinand von Dressel	28 off 835 men	0 off 1 man	0 off 7 men	0 off 6 men
2nd Battalion (2e Bataljon)	Majoor Christian Philipp Schleyer	22 off 637 men	0 off 1 man	0 off 12 men	0 off 16 men
Volunteer Jager Company (Compagnie vrijwillige jagers) ('Oranje-Nassau')	Kapitein Emilius Bergmann	5 off 153 men	0 off 3 men	0 off 16 men	0 off 0 men
Horse Artillery Battery (Batterij rijdende artillerie)	Kapitein Adriaan van Bijleveld	5 off 100 men 6x6 pdr gun, 2x24 pdr how	0 off 2 men	1 off 13 men	0 off 1 man
Train (Trein)	Lieutenant Gert van der Hoeven	2 off 109 men	0 off 0 men	0 off 5 men	0 off 1 men

=== II Corps ===
Unit	Commander	Complement	Killed	Wounded	Missing
II Corps	Lieutenant General Sir Rowland Hill, 1st Viscount Hill	11 off 193 men, 6 guns	0 off 0 men	2 off 6 men	0 off 0 men
1st Troop Sympher's Battery KGLHA, King's German Legion	Captain Augustus Sympher	5 off 193 men	0 off 0 men	2 off 6 men	0 off 0 men
Artillery	Major Heinrich Heise	12 off 191 men	0 off 0 men	0 off 0 men	0 off 0 men
Rogers' Battery RA	Captain Thomas Rogers	5 off 90 men	0 off 0 men	0 off 0 men	0 off 0 men
Braun's Hanoverian Foot Artillery	Captain Wilhelm Braun	4 off 101 men	0 off 0 men	0 off 0 men	0 off 0 men

=== Reserve ===
Under the command of Wellington.

Unit	Commander	Complement	Killed	Wounded	Missing
5th Division	Lieutenant General Sir Thomas Picton	312 off 4,792 men	6 off 84 men	49 off 531 men	3 off 27 men
8th Brigade	Major General Sir James Kempt	167 off 2,348 men	4 off 68 men	44 off 522 men	1 off 0 men
1st Battalion, 28th (North Gloucestershire) Regiment of Foot	Colonel Sir Charles Paul Belson KCB	39 off 580 men	0 off 11 men	4 off 60 men	0 off 0 men
1st Battalion, 32nd (Cornwall) Regiment of Foot	Major (Brevet Lieutenant Colonel) John Hicks	44 off 605 men	2 off 21 men	20 off 153 men	0 off 0 men
79th Regiment of Foot (Cameron Highlanders)	Lieutenant-Colonel Neil Douglas	46 off 656 men	2 off 28 men	16 off 258 men	1 off 0 men
1st Battalion, 95th Regiment of Foot (Rifles)	Lieutenant-Colonel (Brevet Colonel) Sir Andrew Barnard	35 off 507 men	0 off 8 men	4 off 51 men	0 off 0 men
9th Brigade	Major General Sir Dennis Pack	177 off 2,133 men	18 off 107 men	57 off 728 men	0 off 17 men
3rd Battalion, 1st Regiment of Foot (The Royal Scots)	Lieutenant Colonel Colin Campbell	52 off 588 men	6 off 60 men	12 off 180 men	0 off 0 men
42nd (Royal Highland) Regiment of Foot, the "Black Watch"	Lieutenant-Colonel Sir Robert Macara(†) KCB	39 off 550 men	3 off 42 men	14 off 228 men	0 off 0 men
2nd Battalion, 44th (East Essex) Regiment of Foot	Lieutenant-Colonel John Miller Hamerton	36 off 427 men	2 off 10 men	15 off 94 men	0 off 17 men
92nd Regiment of Foot (Gordon Highlanders)	Lieutenant-Colonel John Cameron of Fassifern(†)	47 off 568 men	6 off 35 men	16 off 226 men	0 off 0 men
4th Hanoverian Brigade	Colonel Charles Best	140 off 2,444 men	2 off 16 men	4 off 39 men	2 off 27 men
Landwehr Battalion Lüneburg	Lieutenant Colonel Ludwig von Ramdohr	24 off 582 men	0 off 4 men	2 off 8 men	0 off 4 men
Landwehr Battalion Münden	Major Ferdinand von Schmid	37 off 590 men	0 off 6 men	0 off 14 men	0 off 13 men
Landwehr Battalion Osterode	Major Claus von Reden	35 off 621 men	1 off 1 man	0 off 3 men	0 off 0 men
Landwehr Battalion Verden	Major Christoff von der Decken	34 off 556 men	1 off 5 men	2 off 14 men	2 off 10 men

=== Brunswick Corps ===
Frederick William, Duke of Brunswick-Wolfenbüttel (KIA)

Unit	Commander	Complement	Killed	Wounded	Missing
Brunswick Corps	Lieutenant General Duke of Brunswick	213 off 5,686 men, 16 guns	4 off 85 men	16 off 468 men	0 off 179 men
Brunswick Advance Guard	Major von Rauschenplatt	25 off 647 men	0 off 9 men	4 off 43 men	0 off 0 men
1st Brigade	Lieutenant-Colonel Wilhelm Treusch von Buttlar	94 off 2,597 men	0 off 33 men	8 off 158 men	0 off 57 men
Guard Battalion	Major Frederich von Pröstler	25 off 647 men	0 off 15 men	5 off 106 men	0 off 18 men
1st Light Infantry Battalion	Major von Holstein	23 off 649 men	0 off 0 men	0 off 3 men	0 off 22 men
2nd Light Infantry Battalion	Major Heinrich von Brandenstein	21 off 652 men	0 off 18 men	3 off 49 men	0 off 17 men
3rd Light Infantry Battalion	Major von Ebeling	23 off 649 men	0 off 0 men	0 off 0 men	0 off 0 man
2nd Brigade	Lieutenant-Colonel Frederich von Specht	77 off 1,942 men	3 off 43 men	4 off 267 men	0 off 122 men
1st Line Battalion	Major Metzner	23 off 649 men	1 off 16 men	2 off 86 men	0 off 29 men
2nd Line Battalion	Major von Strombeck	27 off 646 men	2 off 23 men	1 off 162 men	0 off 46 men
3rd Line Battalion	Major Gustavus von Normann	25 off 647 men	0 off 4 men	1 off 19 men	0 off 47 men
Artillery	Major August Mahn	11 off 500 men	0 off 0 men	0 off 0 men	0 off 0 men
Heinemann's Horse Battery	Captain Manfred von Heinemann	5 off 289 men	0 off 0 men	0 off 0 men	0 off 0 men
Moll's Foot Battery	Major Johann Moll	5 off 211 men	0 off 0 men	0 off 0 men	0 off 0 men

=== Cavalry Corps ===
Unit	Commander	Complement	Killed	Wounded	Missing
Anglo-Allied Army Cavalry Corps	Lieutenant General Henry Paget, the 2nd Earl of Uxbridge	122 off 1,870 men, 0 guns	3 off 33 men	5 off 79 men	0 off 96 men
Cavalry of the Brunswick Corps	Major Von Cramm	50 off 872 men	2 off 19 men	2 off 37 men	0 off 45 men
2nd Hussars Regiment	Major von Cramm	34 of 656 men	2 off 15 men	2 off 27 men	0 off 23 men
Uhlans (1 Squadron)	Major Carl Pott	16 off 216 men	0 off 4 men	0 off 10 men	0 off 22 men
3rd Light Brigade (3e Brigade Lichte Cavalerie) (Note: The Anglo-Allied Army number them: 1st Heavy 2nd Light, 3rd Light; but the source Wellington's Army in 1815. British-German-Netherland Order of Battle numbers them Heavy, 1st Light, 2nd Light.)	Generaal-Majoor Jean Baptiste Baron van Merlen	65 off 998 men	1 off 14 men	3 off 42 men	0 off 51 men
5th Light Dragoons (Regiment lichte dragonders No. 5) (Note: The Anglo-Allied Army, but the source Wellington's Army in 1815. British-German-Netherland Order of Battle numbers this the 4th (Dutch) Light Dragoon)	Lieutenant-Kolonel Edouard A. J. G. de Mercx de Corbais	26 off 395 men	0 off 6 men	1 off 23 men	0 off 14 men
6th Hussars (Regiment Huzaren van Boreel)	Lieutenant-Kolonel Jonkheer Willem Francois Boreel	36 off 603 men	1 off 8 men	2 off 19 men	0 off 37 men

== French Army ==
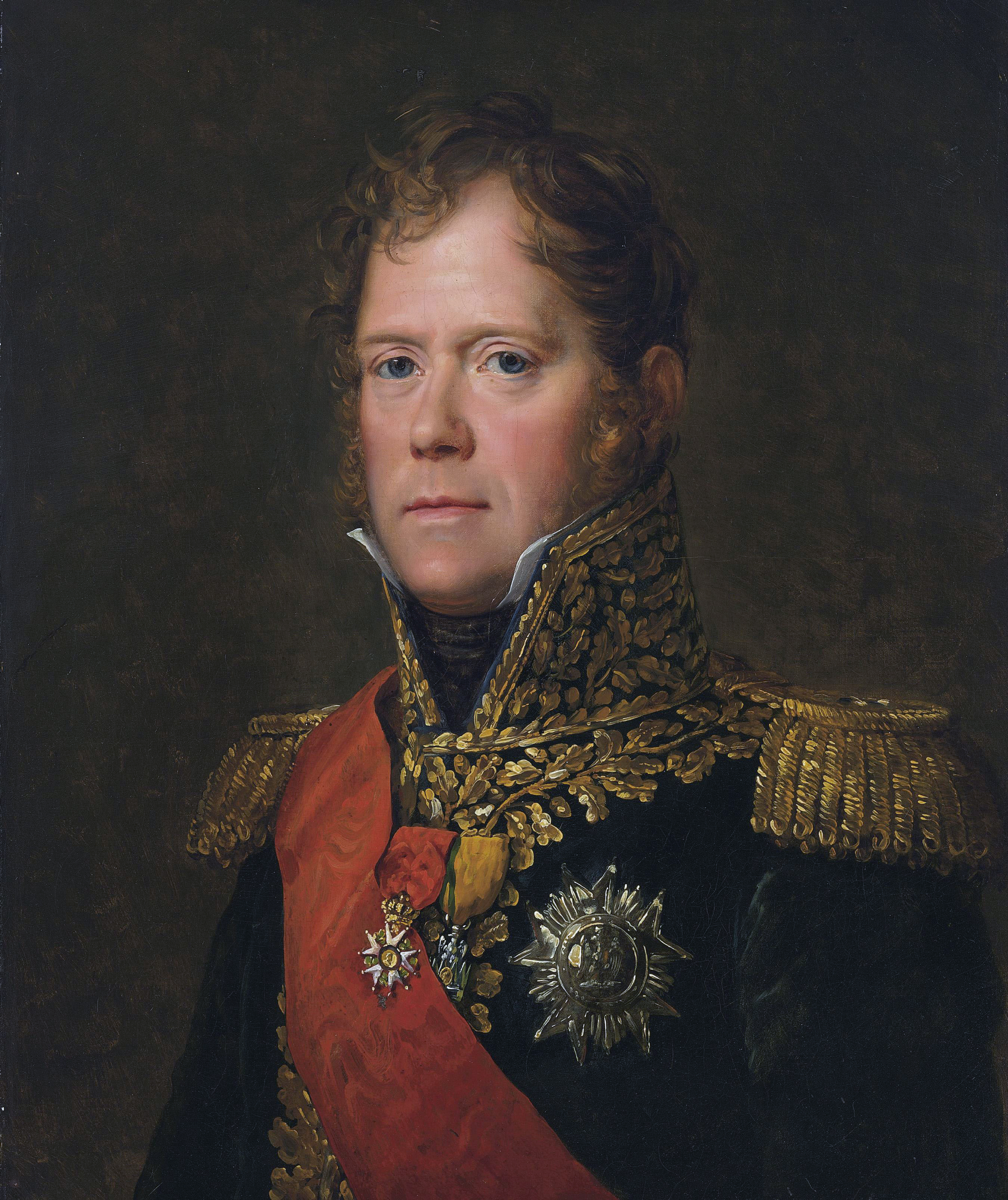
Marshal Michel Ney, Duke of Elchingen, Prince of the Moskowa

Left Wing, Armee du Nord
Marshal of the Empire Michel Ney

=== II Corps ===
Gen de Division Honoré Charles Reille

Division	Brigade	Regiments and Others
5th Division; Gen de Division Gilbert Bachelu	1st Brigade Gen de Brigade Husson	1st Btn, 2nd Light Regt (578); 2nd Btn, 2nd Light Regt (569); 3rd Btn, 2nd Light Regt (577); 4th Btn, 2nd Light Regt (570); 1st Btn, 61st Line Regt (423); 2nd Btn, 61st Line Regt (407)
5th Division; Gen de Division Gilbert Bachelu	2nd Brigade Gen de Brigade Baron Campi	1st Btn, 72nd Line Regt (483); 2nd Btn, 72nd Line Regt (487); 1st Btn, 108th Line Regt (415); 2nd Btn, 108th Line Regt (406); 3rd Btn, 108th Line Regt (251)
5th Division; Gen de Division Gilbert Bachelu	Artillery Cpt Deshailles	18th Bty, 6th Arty (six 6 lb., two 5.5" how.)
6th Division; Gen de Division Prince Jérôme Bonaparte	1st Brigade Gen de Brigade Pierre François Bauduin	1st Btn, 1st Legere Regt (625 approx); 2nd Btn, 1st Legere Regt (625 approx); 3rd Btn, 1st Legere Regt (600 approx); 1st Btn, 3rd Line Regt (600 approx); 2nd Btn, 3rd Line Regt (600 approx)
6th Division; Gen de Division Prince Jérôme Bonaparte	2nd Brigade Gen de Brigade Soye	1st Btn, 1st Line Regt (625 approx); 2nd Btn, 1st Line Regt (600 approx); 3rd Btn, 1st Line Regt (600 approx); 1st Btn, 2nd Line Regt (600 approx); 2nd Btn, 2nd Line Regt (600 approx); 3rd Btn, 2nd Line Regt (575 approx)
6th Division; Gen de Division Prince Jérôme Bonaparte	Artillery Cpt Barbaux	3rd Bty, 2nd Arty (six 6 lb., two 5.5" how.)
9th Division; Gen de Division Maximilien Sebastien Foy	1st Brigade Gen de Brigade Gauthier	1st Btn, 92nd Line Regt (553); 2nd Btn, 92nd Line Regt (472); 1st Btn, 93rd Line Regt (471); 2nd Btn, 93rd Line Regt (472)
9th Division; Gen de Division Maximilien Sebastien Foy	2nd Brigade Gen de Brigade Baron Jamin	1st Btn, 100th Line Regt (423); 2nd Btn, 100th Line Regt (424); 3rd Btn, 100th Line Regt (246); 1st Btn, 4th Light Regt (533); 2nd Btn, 4th Light Regt (536); 3rd Btn, 4th Light Regt (535)
9th Division; Gen de Division Maximilien Sebastien Foy	Artillery Cpt Tacon	1st Bty, 6th Arty (six 6 lb., two 5.5" how.)
2nd Cavalry Division; Gen de Division Hippolyte Piré	1st Brigade Gen de Brigade Pierre Antoine François Huber	1st Chasseur Regt (485); 6th Chasseur Regt (560)
2nd Cavalry Division; Gen de Division Hippolyte Piré	2nd Brigade Gen de Brigade Wathiez	5th Lancer Regt (412); 6th Lancer Regt (381)
2nd Cavalry Division; Gen de Division Hippolyte Piré	Artillery Cpt Gronnier	2nd Bty, 4th Horse Arty (four 6 lb., two 6" how.)
Corps Artillery Baron Le Pelletier	7th Bty, 2nd Arty (six 12 lb., two 6" how.)	

=== III Cavalry Corps ===
Gen de Corps d'Armee François Étienne de Kellermann, Comte de Valmy

Division	Brigade	Regiments and Others
11th Cavalry Division; Gen de Division Baron L'Heritier	1st Brigade Gen de Brigade Picquet	2nd Dragoon Regt (585); 7th Dragoon Regt (516)
11th Cavalry Division; Gen de Division Baron L'Heritier	2nd Brigade Gen de Brigade Guiton	8th Cuirassier Regt (425); 11th Cuirassier Regt (325)
11th Cavalry Division; Gen de Division Baron L'Heritier	Artillery Cpt Marcillac	3rd Bty, 2nd Horse Arty (four 6 lb., two 5.5" how.)
Imperial Guard Light Cavalry Division Gen Charles Lefebvre-Desnouettes	Lancer Regt (880); Chasseur and Mameluke Regt (1,197)	

== See also ==
- Order of Battle of the Waterloo Campaign
