= John Williamson =

John Williamson may refer to:

== Music ==
- John Finley Williamson (1887–1964), American conductor
- John Williamson (singer) (born 1945), Australian singer and songwriter
- John Williamson (musician) (born 1963), bass guitarist in the band McCarthy
- John Williamson (album), the 1970 debut album by the Australian singer

== Politics ==
- John Williamson (Arkansas politician), state legislator who served as President of the Arkansas Senate
- John Williamson (New Zealand politician) (1815–1875), New Zealand politician
- John H. Williamson (1846–1911), North Carolina politician and newspaper publisher
- John N. Williamson (1855–1943), U.S. Representative from Oregon
- John Williamson (communist) (1903–1974), Scottish-born American Communist leader
- John Williamson (Canadian politician) (born 1970), Canadian politician
- John C. Williamson (1912–1998), American politician, member of the California legislature
- John Clint Williamson (born 1961), U.S. Ambassador-at-Large for War Crimes Issues
- John Poage Williamson (1835–1917), American missionary, writer and member of the South Dakota House of Representatives

== Sports ==
- John Williamson (footballer, born 1887) (1887–1943), English footballer for Sunderland
- John Williamson (footballer, born 1893) (1893–1939), English footballer for Manchester United and Bury
- John Williamson (footballer, born 1981), English footballer for Burnley
- John Williamson (basketball, born 1951) (1951–1996), American pro basketball player, New York Nets
- John Williamson (basketball, born 1986), American basketball player in Israel
- Johnny Williamson (1929–2021), English footballer
- Jack Williamson (footballer) (1907–1965), Australian rules footballer
- John Gordon Williamson (1936–2023), English cricketer
- J. R. Williamson (1942–2020), linebacker for the Oakland Raiders and the New England Patriots

== Other ==
- John Williamson (English painter) (1751–1818), English painter
- John Suther Williamson (c. 1775–1836), British military officer
- John Williamson Nevin (1803–1886), American theologian
- John Williamson (Hudson River School) (1826–1885), Scottish-American painter
- John Bruce Williamson (1859–1938), British barrister and historian
- John Ernest Williamson (1881–1966), inventor of the "photosphere" for undersea photography
- John Williamson (mathematician) (1901–1949), Scottish mathematician
- John Williamson (geologist) (1907–1958), Canadian geologist
- Jack Williamson (1908–2006), American science fiction writer
- John Leon Williamson (1921–1942), Navy Cross recipient
- John Williamson (economist) (1937–2021), British professor
- John Williamson (musicologist) (born 1949), Scottish professor
- John Woolfenden Williamson (1869–1950), British writer about industrial networks
- John Williamson (c. 1730 – c. 1803), known by the nickname Johnnie Notions, Shetland smallpox inoculator

== See also ==
- Williamson (surname)
- Williamson (disambiguation)
- John Williams (disambiguation)
