= Roy Creek (Assawoman Bay tributary) =

Roy Creek Tributary to Assawoman Bay
- Location within Delaware Location within the United States

Location
- Country: United States
- State: Delaware
- County: Sussex

Physical characteristics
- Source: Bearhole Ditch divide
  - location: about 0.1 miles north of Williamsville, Delaware
  - coordinates: 38°27′52″N 075°08′10″W
  - elevation: 16 ft (4.9 m)
- Mouth: Assawoman Bay
  - location: Keen-Wik Delaware
  - coordinates: 38°27′25″N 075°05′23″W
  - elevation: 0 ft (0 m)
- Length: 2.65 mi (4.26 km)
- Basin size: 1.24 square miles (3.2 km^{2})
- Discharge
  - average: 1.46 cu ft/s (0.041 m^{3}/s) at mouth with Assawoman Bay

Basin features
- Progression: generally southeast
- River system: Assawoman Bay
- Tributaries
  - left: unnamed tributaries
  - right: Drum Creek
- Bridges: New Road; Lighthouse Road; Americana Parkway

Roy Creek is a 2.65 mi (4.26 km) long 1st order tributary to Assawoman Bay, in Sussex County, Delaware.

== Course ==
Roy Creek rises on the Bearhole Ditch divide about 0.1 miles north of Williamsville in Sussex County, Delaware. Roy Creek then flows generally southeast to meet Assawoman Bay at Keen-Wik, Delaware.

== Watershed ==
Roy Creek drains 1.24 square miles (3.2 km^{2}) of area, receives about 44.5 in/year of precipitation, has a topographic wetness index of 809.54 and is about 4.0% forested.

== See also ==
- List of rivers of Delaware
