= Drum Creek (Roy Creek tributary) =

Drum Creek Tributary to Roy Creek
- Location within Delaware Location within the United States

Location
- Country: United States
- State: Delaware
- County: Sussex

Physical characteristics
- Source: Bearhole Ditch divide
  - location: Williamsville, Delaware
  - coordinates: 38°27′56″N 075°07′52″W
  - elevation: 16 ft (4.9 m)
- Mouth: Roy Creek
  - location: Keen-Wik Delaware
  - coordinates: 38°27′37″N 075°05′44″W
  - elevation: 0 ft (0 m)
- Length: 2.14 mi (3.44 km)
- Basin size: 0.83 square miles (2.1 km^{2})
- Discharge
  - average: 0.98 cu ft/s (0.028 m^{3}/s) at mouth with Roy Creek

Basin features
- Progression: east
- River system: Assawoman Bay
- Tributaries
  - left: unnamed tributaries
  - right: unnamed tributaries
- Bridges: Lighthouse Road; Signature Boulevard; Farmstead Road

Drum Creek is a 2.14 mi (3.44 km) long 1st order tributary to Roy Creek, in Sussex County, Delaware.

== Course ==
Drum Creek rises on the Bearhole Ditch divide at Williamsville in Sussex County, Delaware. Drum Creek then flows east to meet Roy Creek at Keen-Wik, Delaware.

== Watershed ==
Drum Creek drains 0.83 square miles (2.1 km^{2}) of area, receives about 44.5 in/year of precipitation, has a topographic wetness index of 779.20 and is about 1.25% forested.

== See also ==
- List of rivers of Delaware
