= Sandham =

Sandham may refer to:

People

- Andy Sandham (1890–1982), English cricketer
- Charles Freeman Sandham, (1781–1869) British soldier of the Napoleonic Wars
- Elijah Sandham (1875–1944), English socialist politician, Member of Parliament 1929–1931
- Henry Sandham (1842–1910), Canadian painter and illustrator
- Joseph Sandham (fl. 1896), British footballer
- William Sandham (rugby) (1879–?), Welsh rugby union and rugby league player
- William Sandham (footballer) (1898–1963), English footballer

Others

- Sandham Memorial Chapel, Burghclere, Hampshire, England
- Sandham- Symphony Meets Classical Tamil, Music album
- Sandhamn, Island in the Stockholm Archipelago
