= Judge Williams =

Judge Williams may refer to:

- Alexander Williams Jr. (born 1948), judge of the United States District Court for the District of Maryland
- Ann Claire Williams (born 1949), judge of the United States Court of Appeals for the Seventh Circuit
- Archibald Williams (judge) (1801–1863), judge of the United States District Court for the District of Kansas
- Ashton Hilliard Williams (1891–1962), judge of the United States District Court for the Eastern District of South Carolina
- B. John Williams (born 1949), judge of the United States Tax Court
- C. J. Williams (judge) (born 1963), judge of the United States District Court for the Northern District of Iowa
- David W. Williams (1910–2000), judge of the United States District Court for the Central District of California
- Frank J. Williams (born 1940), judge of the U.S. Court of Military Commissions
- Glen Morgan Williams (1920–2012), judge of the United States District Court for the Western District of Virginia
- Gregory B. Williams (born 1969), judge of United States District Court for the District of Delaware
- Jerre Stockton Williams (1916–1993), judge of the United States Court of Appeals for the Fifth Circuit
- John A. Williams (judge) (1835–1900), judge of the United States District Court for the Eastern District of Arkansas
- Karen J. Williams (1951–2013), judge of the United States Court of Appeals for the Fourth Circuit
- Karen M. Williams (born 1963), judge of the United States District Court for the District of New Jersey
- Kathleen M. Williams (born 1956), judge of the United States District Court for the Southern District of Florida
- Mary Ellen Coster Williams (born 1953), judge of the United States Court of Federal Claims
- Omar A. Williams (born 1977), judge of the United States District Court for the District of Connecticut
- Paul X. Williams (1908–1994), judge of the United States District Court for the Western District of Arkansas
- Richard Leroy Williams (1923–2011), judge of the United States District Court for the Eastern District of Virginia
- Robert L. Williams (1868–1948), judge of the United States Court of Appeals for the Tenth Circuit
- Spencer Mortimer Williams (1922–2008), judge of the United States District Court for the Northern District of California
- Stephen F. Williams (1936–2020), judge of the United States Court of Appeals for the District of Columbia Circuit
- Thomas Sutler Williams (1872–1940), judge of the United States Court of Claims

== See also ==
- Justice Williams (disambiguation)
