= Judge Kerrigan =

Judge Kerrigan may refer to:

- Kathleen Kerrigan (judge) (born 1964), judge of the United States Tax Court
- Frank Henry Kerrigan (1868–1935), judge of the United States District Court for the Northern District of California
