= Ruwe =

Ruwe is a surname. Notable people with the surname include:

- Field Ruwe (born 1955), Zambian educator, historian, author and media practitioner
- Robert Ruwe (born 1941), American judge
- Jürgen Ruwe (born 1946), German military officer
