= Williamson =

Williamson may refer to:

== Places ==
- Williamson, Arizona
- Williamson, Georgia
- Williamson, Illinois
- Williamson, Iowa
- Williamson, New York, a town in Wayne County, New York.
- Williamson (CDP), New York, a hamlet and census-designated place in Wayne County, New York.
- Williamson, West Virginia
- Williamson County, Illinois
- Williamson County, Tennessee
- Williamson County, Texas

== People ==
- Williamson (surname)

== Other uses ==
- Williamson v. Lee Optical Co., a 1955 U.S. Supreme Court case
- Williamson amplifier, a type of push-pull audio amplifier with low distortion first designed in 1947
- Williamson Road Junior Public School, an elementary school in Toronto, Ontario
- Williamson ether synthesis, one of the most common methods for preparing ethers
- J. C. Williamson's, a firm of Australian theatrical producers

== See also ==
- Williams (disambiguation)
- Williamston (disambiguation)
- Williamstown (disambiguation)
- Justice Williamson (disambiguation)
- Wilson (disambiguation)
