= Diane Kroupa =

American attorney (born 1955)

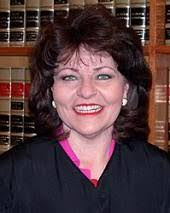

Judge of the United States Tax Court
- In office June 12, 2003 – June 16, 2014
- Appointed by: George W. Bush
- Preceded by: Robert Ruwe
- Succeeded by: Patrick J. Urda

Personal details
- Born: October 12, 1955 (age 69); Mitchell, South Dakota, U.S.
- Education: Georgetown University (BS); University of South Dakota (JD)

Diane Lynn Kroupa (born October 12, 1955) is an American attorney who served as a federal judge of the United States Tax Court from 2003 until 2014. Kroupa previously was the Chief Judge of the Minnesota Tax Court. Following her criminal conviction in U.S. District Court for a tax-related crime (conspiracy to defraud the United States), she was sentenced to 34 months in prison. She has since been released from prison.

== Early life and education ==
Kroupa received a Bachelor of Science in Foreign Service from the Georgetown University Edmund A. Walsh School of Foreign Service in 1978, followed in 1981 by a J.D. from the University of South Dakota School of Law.

== Career ==
Prior to appointment to the Tax Court, Kroupa worked for the Internal Revenue Service as attorney-advisor, Legislation and Regulations Division, Office of Chief Counsel. She also worked at the Tax Court prior to her appointment as an attorney-advisor to Judge Joel Gerber from 1984 to 1985. Kroupa practiced tax law at Faegre & Benson, LLP in Minneapolis, Minnesota. She became a Minnesota Tax Court Judge from 1995 to 2001 and was Chief Judge from 1998 to 2001.

== Federal Judicial Service ==
She was appointed by President George W. Bush as a Federal Judge on the United States Tax Court, on June 13, 2003, for a term ending June 12, 2018. Although under the Internal Revenue Code section 7447 Kroupa didn't serve the sufficient amount of time (15 years) and was under 65 (minimum retirement age) she retired rather than resigned from the Tax Court on June 16, 2014. If she had resigned she would not be entitled to collect her salary for life. Retired judges collect full salary for life.

== Federal criminal tax charges ==
On April 4, 2016, Kroupa and her husband, Robert E. Fackler, were indicted on "conspiracy, tax evasion, making and subscribing false tax returns and obstruction of an Internal Revenue Service (IRS) audit" as a "result of an investigation conducted by the Criminal Investigation Division of the IRS and the United States Postal Inspection Service."

On October 21, 2016, Kroupa pled guilty to conspiring to defraud the United States for $450,000 in taxes. In June 2017, Kroupa was sentenced to 34 months in prison and ordered to pay more than $450,000 in restitution.

== Memberships and activities ==
- Admitted to practice law in South Dakota (1981), District of Columbia (1985) and Minnesota (1986).
- Member, American Bar Association (Tax Section), Minnesota State Bar Association (Tax Section), National Association of Women Judges (1995 to present), American Judicature Society (1995 to present).
- Distinguished Service Award Recipient (2001) Minnesota State Bar Association (Tax Section).
- Volunteer of the Year Award, Junior League of Minneapolis (1993) and Community Volunteer of the Year, Minnesota State Bar Association (1998).

== Attribution ==
Material on this page was copied from the website of the United States Tax Court, which is published by a United States government agency, and is therefore in the public domain.

Legal offices
Preceded by Robert Ruwe	Judge of the United States Tax Court; 2003–2014	Succeeded by Patrick J. Urda
