= Kathleen Kerrigan =

Kathleen Kerrigan may refer to:

- Kathleen Kerrigan (judge)
- Kathleen Kerrigan (actress)
