= B. John Williams =

American judge (born 1949)

John Williams

Judge of the United States Tax Court
- In office December 2, 1985 – January 1, 1990
- Appointed by: Ronald Reagan
- Preceded by: Howard Dawson
- Succeeded by: Renato Beghe

Personal details
- Born: Bernard John Williams Jr. December 13, 1949 (age 75); Lancaster, Pennsylvania, U.S.
- Education: George Washington University (BA, JD)

Bernard John Williams Jr. (born December 13, 1949) is an American lawyer who served as a judge of the United States Tax Court from 1985 to 1990.

Born in Lancaster, Pennsylvania to Bernard J. and Sarah Elizabeth (Sykes) Williams, he received B.A. with distinction from the George Washington University in 1971, and a J.D., with honors, from the George Washington University Law School in 1974, where he was a member of Phi Beta Kappa and Omicron Delta Kappa, and a member of The George Washington Law Review. He was then a law clerk to Judge Bruce M. Forrester of the United States Tax Court from 1974 to 1976.

He was an associate with Ballard, Spahr, Andrews, and Ingersoll in Philadelphia, Pennsylvania from 1976 to 1981. He was Special Assistant to the Chief Counsel, Internal Revenue Service in Washington, D.C. from 1981 to 1983. He was Deputy Assistant Attorney General, Tax Division, United States Department of Justice from 1983 to 1984, and a partner of the law firm of Morgan, Lewis & Bockius from 1984 to 1985. He was appointed by President Ronald Reagan to the U.S. Tax Court for a 15-year term commencing on December 2, 1985, to succeed Judge Howard Dawson. Williams resigned in 1990 to return to private practice with Morgan, Lewis & Bockius, heading the firm's tax litigation practice until 2000, when he became a partner at Shearman & Sterling.

On July 3, 2001 President George W. Bush nominated Williams to serve as Chief Counsel of the Internal Revenue Service and an Assistant General Counsel in the Department of the Treasury. The U.S. Senate confirmed Williams on January 25, 2002.

Williams married Martha C. Roberts in 1977, with whom he has four children, Robert, Sarah, Anne, and Bernard.

Legal offices
| Preceded by Howard Dawson | Judge of the United States Tax Court; 1985–1990 | Succeeded by Renato Beghe |
