= Williamsville =

Williamsville is the name of some places:

United States of America

- Williamsville, Kent County, Delaware
- Williamsville, Sussex County, Delaware
- Williamsville, Illinois
- Williamsville, Cass County, Michigan
- Williamsville, Livingston County, Michigan
- Williamsville, Missouri
- Williamsville, Nevada (Ragtown)
- Williamsville, New York
- Williamsville, Vermont
- Williamsville, Virginia
- Williamsville (Studley, Virginia), a historic house

Other

- Williamsville, Cote D'Ivoire
- Williamsville, Dublin, Ireland
- Williamsville, Kingston, Ontario
- Williamsville, Trinidad and Tobago
