= Francis Hepburn =

British Army officer

Lieutenant-Colonel Francis Hepburn CB (19 August 1779 – 7 June 1835) was a British Army officer who served during the Napoleonic Wars and commanded the 3rd Foot Guards at the Battle of Waterloo on 18 June 1815.

== Family background ==
His grandfather, James Hepburn, of Rickarton and Keith Marshall, spent his fortune on the Stuart cause and had two sons. The eldest, Robert Hepburn became a lieutenant-colonel in the Enniskillen Dragoons while the younger, David was Francis' father from his marriage to Bertha Graham of the Inchbrakie family. David was a Colonel of Infantry who saw action at the siege Belleisle in 1761 before he was forced to retire from the service due to health problems. Francis' elder brother James became a civil servant with the East India Company.

== Military career ==
Hepburn joined the 3rd Foot Guards of the British Army as an ensign on 17 December 1794 and was promoted to lieutenant and captain on 28 May 1798. He saw service in the Irish Rebellion of 1798 and the following year accompanied the expedition to the Helder in Holland. Promoted to captain and lieutenant-colonel on 23 July 1807, at the 1811 Battle of Barrosa he was seriously wounded in the leg by a musket ball but refused amputation knowing that it would cut short his military career. Nevertheless, he was forced to return home owing to the injury and did not arrive back in the Iberian Peninsula until the autumn of 1812 when he took charge of a small corps of sharpshooters. He saw further action at the battles of Vittoria, Nivelle and the Nive during the Peninsular War, for which he received the Army Gold Medal and one clasp.

In 1814 he was ordered home to take command of the 2nd Battalion of the 3rd Foot Guards in preparation for the forthcoming expedition to the Netherlands, but due to adverse winds he arrived too late. He remained in England until June 1815 before joining Wellington in Brussels. He saw action at Quatre Bras on the 16 June and on the 17th then on the 18th commanded the 2nd Battalion of the 3rd Guards at the Battle of Waterloo. Early on in the action he was ordered to Château d'Hougoumont to reinforce Colonel Macdonnell and Lord Saltoun, where he defended the orchard and wood at a heavy cost in both officers and men. A mistake in subsequent despatches omitted Hepburn's name from the official account of the action. Nevertheless, he was made a Companion of the Order of the Bath (CB) and received both the Order of Wilhelm from the King of the Netherlands and the 4th class of the Order of St Vladimir from the Russians.

After the cessation of hostilities, Hepburn remained in France as part of the Army of Occupation commanding 2nd Battalion, 3rd Foot Guards as part of the 2nd British Brigade, 1st British Division.

== Personal life ==
In July, 1820 Hepburn married Henrietta, elder daughter and heir of Sir Henry Poole, 5th and last baronet of Poole, Cheshire. Henrietta died in Chorley, Lancashire on 5 October 1862 aged 72.

== Death ==
He died on 7 June 1835 in Tunbridge Wells, Kent.
