= Renato Beghe =

American judge (1933–2012)

Senior Judge of the United States Tax Court
- In office February 28, 2003 – July 7, 2012

Judge of the United States Tax Court
- In office March 26, 1991 – February 28, 2003
- Appointed by: George H. W. Bush
- Preceded by: B. John Williams
- Succeeded by: Harry Haines

Personal details
- Born: Renato William Beghe; March 12, 1933 Chicago, Illinois, U.S.
- Died: July 7, 2012 (aged 79) Washington, D.C., U.S.
- Relatives: 4, including Jason Beghe
- Education: University of Chicago

Renato William Beghe (/bəˈɡeɪ/; March 12, 1933 – July 7, 2012) was a judge of the United States Tax Court appointed by President George H. W. Bush.

Beghe was born in Illinois, the son of Emmavve (née Frymire) and Bruno Beghe, an Italian-born painter, sculptor, and violinist. Beghe received his bachelor's degree from the University of Chicago in 1951 and his J.D. from the University of Chicago in 1954. While a student, he joined Phi Beta Kappa, Order of the Coif and Phi Gamma Delta. Beghe was the co-managing editor of the law review. He was admitted to the New York Bar in 1955 and practiced law with the New York City firm of Carter Ledyard & Milburn until 1983. He practiced with the New York City firm of Morgan, Lewis & Bockius until 1989. President George H. W. Bush appointed him as a Judge on the United States Tax Court on March 26, 1991, for a term ending March 25, 2006. Beghe retired on February 28, 2003, but continued to perform judicial duties as a senior judge on recall. Beghe died on July 7, 2012, after a long illness.

Beghe was a member of numerous professional organizations, including the American Bar Association, Tax Section; the International Bar Association; Business Section Committee N (Taxation); Judge's Forum; Human Rights Institute; International Fiscal Association; American Law Institute, American College of Tax Counsel; and the Honorable Order of Kentucky Colonels.

His son is actor Jason Beghe.
