= Williamstown =

Williamstown or Williamtown is the name of several places in the world:

== Australia ==
- Williamtown, New South Wales
  - RAAF Base Williamtown, New South Wales
- Williamstown, South Australia
- Williamstown, Victoria
  - Williamstown railway line
  - Williamstown railway station
  - Williamstown Beach railway station
- Williamstown, Western Australia, a suburb of Kalgoorlie
- Electoral district of Williamstown, an electoral district in Victoria

== Cameroon ==
- Williamstown, Bimbia, a historical village in the kingdom of Bimbia, now no longer in existence

== Canada ==
- Williamstown, Ontario
- the historical name of Strange, Ontario

== Ireland ==
- a townland in Ballyloughloe civil parish, barony of Clonlonan, County Westmeath
- an area of Blackrock, Dublin
- Williamstown, County Galway, a village
- Williamstown, County Limerick, a townland
- Williamstown, County Roscommon
- a townland in Foyran civil parish, barony of Fore, County Westmeath
- a townland in Mayne civil parish, barony of Fore, County Westmeath
- a townland in Piercetown civil parish, barony of Rathconrath, County Westmeath

== United Kingdom ==
- Williamstown, Rhondda Cynon Taf, Wales

== United States ==
- Williamstown, Indiana
- Williamstown, alternative name for Frytown, Iowa
- Williamstown, Kansas
- Williamstown, Kentucky
- Williamstown, Massachusetts, a New England town
  - Williamstown (CDP), Massachusetts, the main village in the town
- Williamstown, New Jersey
- Williamstown, New York
- Williamstown, Ohio
- Williamstown, Pennsylvania
- Williamstown, Vermont, a New England town
  - Williamstown (CDP), Vermont, the main village in the town
- Williamstown, West Virginia
- Williamstown, Wisconsin
- Williamstown Township, Michigan

== See also ==
- Williamston (disambiguation)
- Williamson (disambiguation)
