= Thomas Aird (British Army officer) =

British Army officer

Lieutenant-Colonel Thomas Aird (21 December 1760 – 1 November 1839) was a British Army officer of the Napoleonic era who was present at the Battle of Waterloo on 18 June 1815.

== Career ==
Born in Maybole, South Ayrshire, Scotland, Aird joined the 2nd Dragoons as a cornet on 20 August 1784. After serving with the Duke of York on the Continent in 1793–5, he was promoted to lieutenant in 1799 and then transferred to the Royal Waggon Train as a captain on 2 May 1800; promotion to major followed on 27 October 1808; to brevet Lieutenant Colonel on 2 June 1814 and to lieutenant-colonel on 4 May 1815.

He served during the Peninsular War and in Flanders and commanded the Royal Waggon Train at the Battle of Waterloo.

On 25 December 1818 he was placed on half pay and died on 1 November 1839 in Sunderland, North East England. There is a memorial tablet dedicated to Aird in the Parish Church at Maybole.

== Personal life ==
Aird had a daughter who in 1814 married Lieutenant John Raleigh Elwes of the 71st (Highland) Regiment of Foot who died of wounds received at Waterloo a few days after the battle.

== Bibliography ==
- Bromley, Janet; Bromley, David (2015). Wellington's Men Remembered Volume 1: A Register of Memorials to Soldiers who Fought in the Peninsular War and at Waterloo- Volume I: A to L. Pen and Sword. ISBN 978-1-4738-5768-1.
- Dalton, Charles (1904). The Waterloo roll call. With biographical notes and anecdotes. London: Eyre and Spottiswoode.
- Philippart, John (1820). The Royal Military Calendar or Army Service and Commission Book. Vol. V.
