= Patrick J. Urda =

American judge (born 1976)

Pat Urda
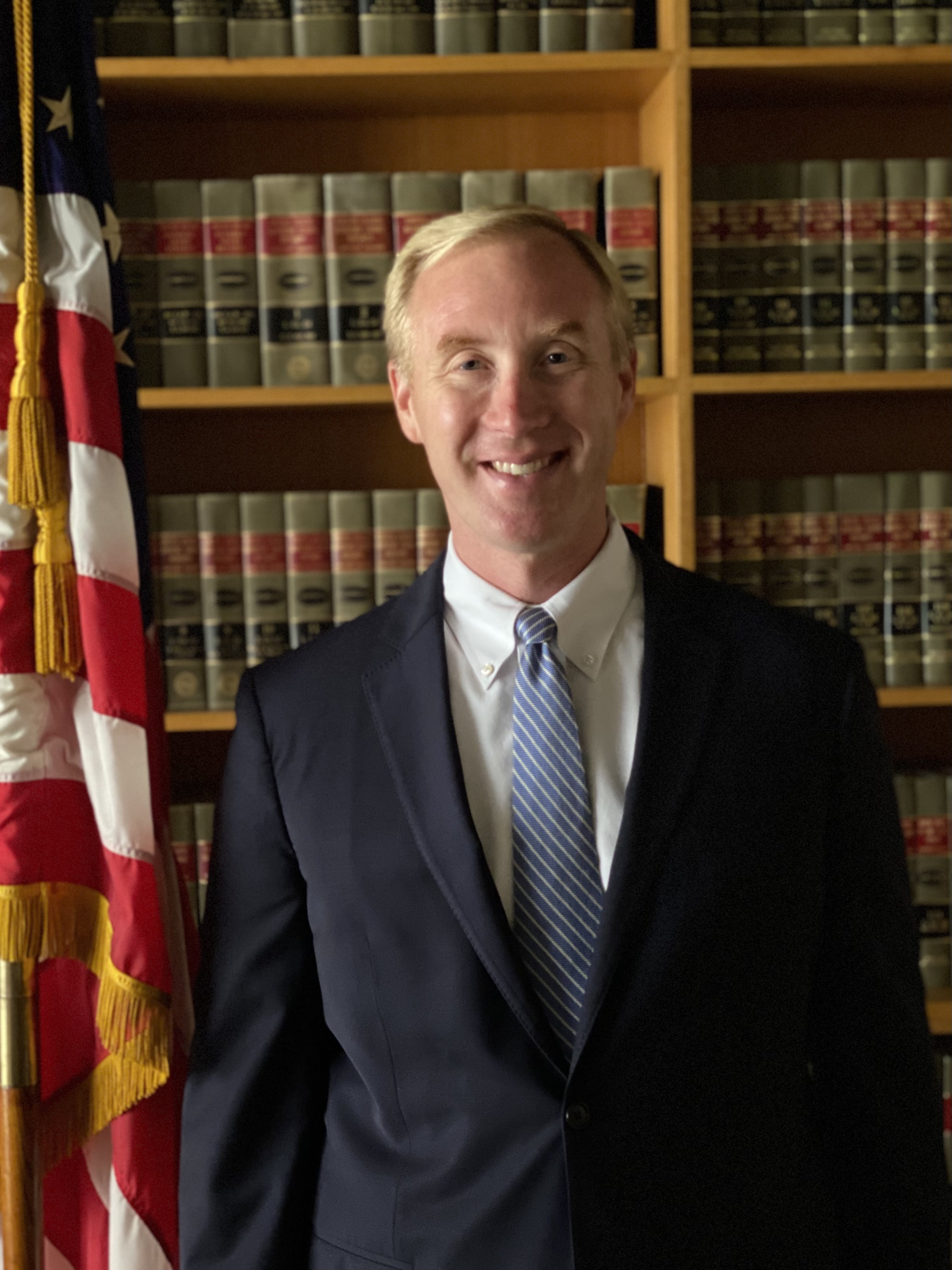
- Judge Urda in 2022

Chief Judge of the United States Tax Court
- Incumbent
- Assumed office June 1, 2025
- Preceded by: Kathleen Kerrigan

Judge of the United States Tax Court
- Incumbent
- Assumed office September 27, 2018
- Appointed by: Donald Trump
- Preceded by: Diane Kroupa

Personal details
- Born: Patrick Joseph Urda; 1976 (age 48–49) South Bend, Indiana, U.S.
- Education: University of Notre Dame (BA); Harvard University (JD)

Patrick Joseph Urda (born 1976) is an American lawyer who has served as a judge of the United States Tax Court since 2018, including as its chief judge since 2025.

== Early life ==
Urda grew up in South Bend, Indiana with four siblings, where his father Richard was a tax lawyer and his mother Kathleen taught statistics at St. Mary's College. He is an Eagle Scout.

== Education ==
Urda graduated from St. Joseph High School in South Bend, Indiana. He received his Bachelor of Arts degree in classics, summa cum laude, from the University of Notre Dame, where he was inducted into Phi Beta Kappa. He received his Juris Doctor from Harvard Law School.

== Legal and academic career ==
At the start of his legal career, Urda spent three years in private practice and served as a law clerk to Judge Daniel Anthony Manion of the United States Court of Appeals for the Seventh Circuit.

From 2012 to 2015 Urda was an adjunct professor at American University Washington College of Law.

=== Department of Justice career ===
Before becoming a judge, Urda held several positions with the United States Department of Justice Tax Division. He was counsel to the Deputy Assistant Attorney General, where he advised him and the Tax Division front office on legal and administrative issues facing the Division, particularly regarding appellate and settlement matters. He also served on two temporary detail assignments outside the Tax Division, at the Office of Legal Policy Nominations Counsel, and the Office of Overseas Prosecutorial Development Assistance and Training. In addition, he was a member of the Tax Division's Appellate Section, which he joined in 2006.

While working in the Appellate Section, he litigated more than eighty appeals from the United States Tax Court and the United States District Courts and has presented oral argument on behalf of the United States in more than forty-five appeals, including arguments in each of the United States Courts of Appeals. He was also one of the principal drafters of the United States' successful brief in Hall v. United States, 566 U.S. 506 (2012).

== Awards ==
Urda is a five-time recipient of the Tax Division's Outstanding Attorney Award, and has received the IRS's Mitchell Rogovin Award.

== United States Tax Court service ==
On August 3, 2017, President Donald Trump nominated Urda to serve as a Judge of the United States Tax Court, to the seat vacated by Judge Diane Kroupa, who retired on June 16, 2014. The Senate Finance Committee held a hearing on his nomination on June 12, 2018, and then reported his nomination unanimously on June 28, 2018. On August 28, 2018, his nomination was confirmed by voice vote. He assumed office as a judge on September 27, 2018. Urda was selected to serve as the court's chief judge for a two-year term effective June 1, 2025.

Legal offices
Preceded by Diane Kroupa	Judge of the United States Tax Court; 2018–present	Incumbent
Preceded by Kathleen Kerrigan	Chief Judge of the United States Tax Court; 2025–present	Incumbent
