= Harry Haines =

Harry Haines may refer to:

- Harry Haines (judge) (1939–2026), American lawyer and judge who served on the United States Tax Court
- Harry L. Haines (1880–1947), American businessman and member of the U.S. House of Representatives from Pennsylvania
- Harry Haines (The Bill), fictional character on BBC TV series The Bill from 1992–1995
