= Williamsport =

Williamsport is a place name that may refer to the following places in the United States:

- Williamsport, Arizona
- Williamsport, Indiana
- Williamsport, Maryland
- Williamsport, Michigan
- Williamsport, Ohio
- Williamsport, Pennsylvania, the largest Williamsport in the United States
  - Williamsport Regional Airport
- Williamsport, Tennessee
- Williamsport, West Virginia

== See also ==
- Williamsport Township, Shawnee County, Kansas
