= Charles Belson =

British Army officer

KCB Charles Belson
- Born: Charles Philip Belson; 1773
- Died: 5 November, 1830 (aged 56–57); Blackheath, London, England
- Military career
- Allegiance: United Kingdom
- Branch: British Army
- Rank: Colonel
- Commands: 13th Regiment of Foot; 28th (North Gloucestershire) Regiment of Foot; 56th Regiment of Foot

Colonel Sir Charles Philip Belson KCB (1773 – 5 November 1830) was a British Army officer who served during the Peninsular War and the Waterloo Campaign.

== Career ==
Belson joined the army in 1794 as an ensign in the 13th Regiment of Foot and thereafter graduated to the 6th West India Regiment, 9th Regiment of Foot and the 7th Light Dragoons. He joined the 28th (North Gloucestershire) Regiment of Foot in the Peninsular War and for his service received the Gold Medal and two clasps. After the Battle of Quatre Bras he succeeded to the command of the 8th Brigade and at Waterloo he commanded the 28th when he had two horses killed under him and two wounded. The 28th maintained their square for over an hour in the face of repeated charges by French cuirassiers and lancers.

He became lieutenant-colonel of the 56th Regiment of Foot on 9 May 1816 and died at Blackheath, London on 5 November 1830, aged 57.
