= Williams River =

Williams River may refer to:

== Australia ==
- Williams River (New South Wales)
- Williams River (Western Australia)

== United States ==
- Williams River (Housatonic River), a tributary of the Housatonic River in western Massachusetts
- Williams River (Oregon)
- Williams River (Vermont)
- Williams River (West Virginia)
- Bill Williams River, in Arizona
