= Kathleen Kerrigan (judge) =

American judge (born 1964)

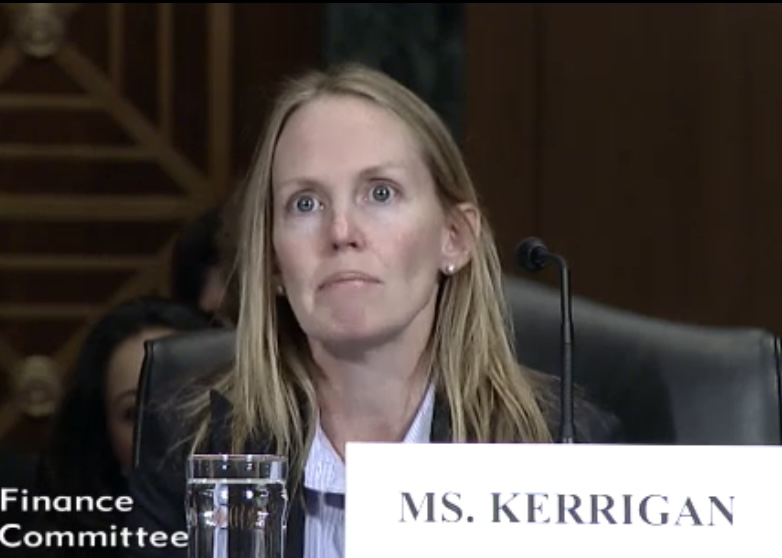

Chief Judge of the United States Tax Court
- In office June 1, 2022 – May 31, 2025
- Preceded by: Maurice B. Foley
- Succeeded by: Patrick J. Urda

Judge of the United States Tax Court
- Incumbent
- Assumed office May 4, 2012
- Appointed by: Barack Obama
- Preceded by: Harry Haines

Personal details
- Born: Kathleen Marie Sullivan Springfield, Massachusetts, U.S.
- Education: Boston College (BS); University of Notre Dame (JD)

Kathleen Marie Kerrigan (née Sullivan; born in 1964) is an American lawyer who has served as a judge of the United States Tax Court since 2012, including as its chief judge from 2022 to 2025.

== Biography ==
Kerrigan was born in Springfield, Massachusetts. She received her Bachelor of Science degree in 1985, from Boston College and her Juris Doctor degree in 1990, from the Notre Dame Law School. She served as the legislative director for United States Representative Richard E. Neal from 1991 to 1998. She was an associate and later partner at the law firm of Baker & Hostetler from 1998 to 2005. From 2005 to 2012, she served as tax counsel to the majority staff of the United States Senate Committee on Small Business and Entrepreneurship and also as staff director for the Finance Subcommittee on Social Security, Pensions, and Family Policy.

== Tax Court service ==
On May 26, 2011, President Barack Obama nominated Kerrigan to serve as a Judge of the United States Tax Court, to the seat vacated by Judge Harry A. Haines, whose term had expired. Her nomination received a hearing before the United States Senate Committee on Finance on November 17, 2011, and was reported favorably on December 17, 2011. Her nomination was confirmed by the United States Senate on March 29, 2012. She received her commission on May 4, 2012. Her commission will expire on May 3, 2027, at which time her fifteen-year term will end. On February 25, 2022, she was elected to serve a two-year term as chief judge starting on June 1, 2022. She was re-elected in 2024, serving as chief judge until May 31, 2025.

Legal offices
Preceded by Harry Haines	Judge of the United States Tax Court; 2012–present	Incumbent
Preceded by Maurice B. Foley	Chief Judge of the United States Tax Court; 2022–2025	Succeeded by Patrick J. Urda
