= Justice Williamson =

Justice Williamson

- John I. Williamson (1867–1933), associate justice of the Supreme Court of Missouri
- Robert B. Williamson (1899–1976), associate justice of the Maine Supreme Judicial Court
- Robert McAlpin Williamson (c. 1804–1859), associate justice of the Republic of Texas Supreme Court
- Neil William Williamson (1938–1996), judge of the High Court of New Zealand who presided over the Bain family murders and Peter Ellis (childcare worker) cases
