= John Williamson (Hudson River School) =

Scottish-American painter

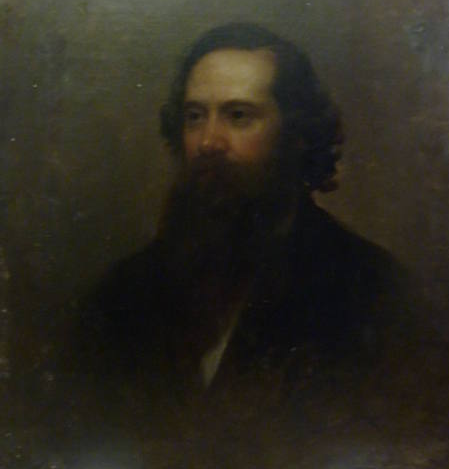
- Self-portrait
- Born: 1826; Scotland
- Died: 1885 (aged 58–59); United States
- Occupations: Landscape and still life painter

John Williamson (1826–1885) was a Scottish–American landscape and still life painter. He was a member of the Hudson River School.

== Biography ==
Williamson was born in 1826 in Scotland. When he was five, Williamson moved with his family to Brooklyn, New York, where he spent the majority of his life. His paintings started appearing at the National Academy of Design in 1850, and he was named an associate of the academy in 1861. Williamson annually showcased his works at the academy's exhibitions until his death in 1885. He also participated in exhibitions for the American Art-Union and the Brooklyn Art Association (of which he was a founding member in 1861).

Williamson primarily painted still lifes until switching to landscapes in 1870. He produced many landscapes of mountains in the Northeastern United States. Art scholar John Driscoll stated that "[Williamson’s] paintings tend to be small and intimate in character and beautifully composed, and reflect a fine and subtle sense of color. Mood is always a stronger component of his work than detail and he thus seems allied in temperament with works by Kensett and Gifford."
