= Poole baronets =

Extinct baronetcy in the Baronetage of England

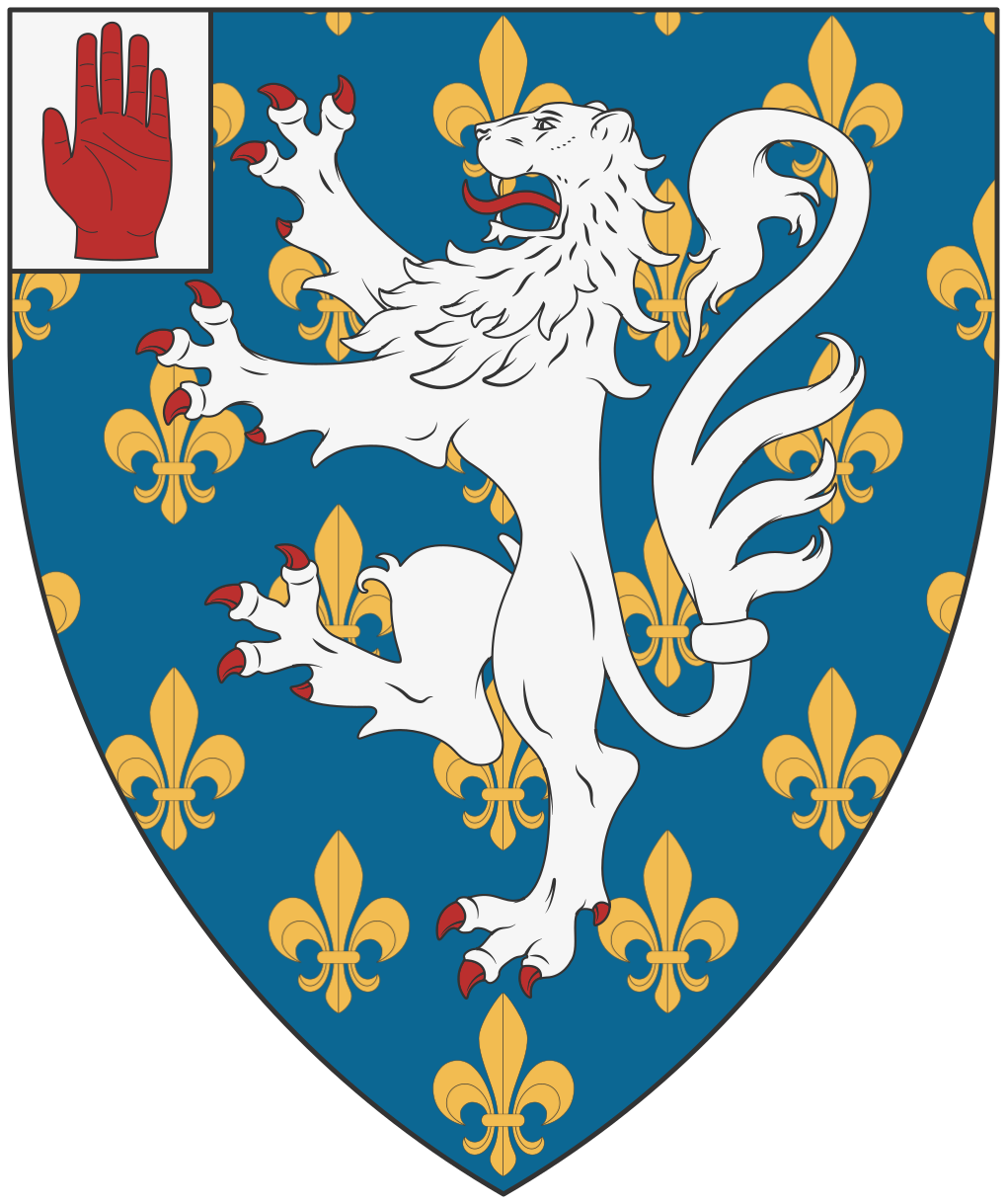
The coat of arms of the Poole baronets.

The Poole Baronetcy, of Poole in the County of Chester, was a title in the Baronetage of England. It was created on 25 October 1677 for James Poole. The title became extinct on the death of the fifth baronet in 1821.

== Poole baronets, of Poole (1677) ==
- Sir James Poole, 1st Baronet (c. 1640–c. 1710)
- Sir Francis Poole, 2nd Baronet (c. 1682–1763)
- Sir Henry Poole, 3rd Baronet (died 1767)
- Sir Ferdinando Poole, 4th Baronet (died 1804), High Sheriff of Sussex
- Sir Henry Poole, 5th Baronet (1744–1821)
