= John Williamson (footballer, born 1893) =

English footballer

John Williamson (born 1893) was an English footballer. His regular position was at full back. He was born in Manchester. He played for Manchester United and Bury.
