= Howard Dawson =

American judge (1922–2016)

Howard Athalone Dawson Jr. (October 23, 1922 – July 15, 2016) was an American jurist who served as a judge of the United States Tax Court.

Born in Okolona, Arkansas, Dawson graduated from Woodrow Wilson High School in Washington, D.C., in 1940. Following the outbreak of World War II, he served as a captain in the U.S. Army Finance Corps from 1943–45, spending two years in European Theater. He went on to earn a B.S. in commerce from University of North Carolina at Chapel Hill in 1946. Following college, he earned his J.D. with honors from The George Washington University Law School in 1949. At George Washington he was the president of the case club and secretary-treasurer of the student bar association.

He was appointed by President John F. Kennedy as judge on Tax Court of the United States, on August 21, 1962, for a term ending June 1, 1970, and was reappointed by President Richard Nixon on June 2, 1970, for a term ending June 1, 1985. This was one of several appointments which went against a previously observed senate resolution prohibiting the appointment to that body of persons recently employed by the Treasury Department. He served as chief judge of the Tax Court from July 1, 1973, to June 30, 1977, and again from July 1, 1983, to June 1, 1985. He retired on June 2, 1985. He was recalled as senior judge to perform judicial duties in 1990 and served in that role until his death in 2016.

== Career ==
Before being a judge, Dawson had been in private practice in Washington, D.C., from 1949–50. He then served in the United States Treasury Department, at the Internal Revenue Service, as an attorney and later as counsel, before his appointment to the Tax Court. After his time on the bench, in the 1980s and 1990s, he become a professor at the University of Akron Law School, the University of Baltimore Law School, and finally at the University of San Diego.

== Organizations ==
- Member of District of Columbia Bar, 1949,
- Georgia Bar
- American Bar Association (Section of Taxation)
- Federal Bar Association
- Chi Psi
- Delta Theta Phi
- George Washington University Law Alumni Association

== Note ==
Material on this page was copied from the website of the United States Tax Court, which is published by a United States government agency, and is therefore in the public domain.
