= Williams Gap =

Gap in Nebraska, US

Coordinates: 41°39′16″N 103°27′40″W

Williams Gap, at an elevation of 4,400 ft (1,300 m), is a gap in Banner County, Nebraska.

Williams Gap was named for George Williams, a pioneer who settled there.
