= Harry Haines (judge) =

American judge (1939–2026)

Senior Judge of the United States Tax Court
- In office May 30, 2009 – 2016

Judge of the United States Tax Court
- In office April 22, 2003 – May 30, 2009
- Appointed by: George W. Bush
- Preceded by: Renato Beghe
- Succeeded by: Kathleen Kerrigan

Personal details
- Born: Harry Allen Haines; May 30, 1939 Missoula, Montana, U.S.
- Died: September 22, 2026 (aged 87) Missoula, Montana, U.S.
- Education: St. Olaf College (BA); University of Montana (JD); New York University (LLM)

Harry Allen Haines (May 30, 1939 – September 22, 2026) was an American lawyer and judge who served on the United States Tax Court from 2003 to 2016, first as a regular judge and subsequently as a senior judge. Before his judicial appointment, he practiced law in Missoula, Montana, for nearly four decades and taught at the University of Montana School of Law.

== Early life, education and career ==
Born in Missoula, Montana on May 30, 1939, to Jack and Millie Haines, he attended Paxson Grade School and graduated from Missoula County High School in 1957. In 1956, he participated in an American Field Service exchange program in the Netherlands. Haines received a Bachelor of Arts degree from St. Olaf College in 1961, a Juris Doctor from the University of Montana School of Law in 1964, and a Master of Laws degree in taxation from New York University School of Law in 1966.

Haines was admitted to the Montana bar in 1964, and from 1966 to 2003, he practiced law in Missoula as a partner in the firm of Worden, Thane & Haines. He also served as an adjunct professor at the University of Montana School of Law from 1967 to 1991.

In addition to his legal practice, Haines taught taxation to legal and other professionals and members of the public.

== Judicial career ==
In 2003, Senator Max Baucus of Montana recommended Haines for appointment to the United States Tax Court. President George W. Bush nominated him to succeed Judge Renato Beghe, who was retiring.

Haines began serving as a judge of the Tax Court on April 22, 2003, with a statutory term scheduled to expire on April 21, 2018. He assumed senior judge status on May 30, 2009, and continued serving until 2016.

In October 2015, Haines received the Distinguished Service Award at the 63rd Annual Montana Tax Institute for his service to the University of Montana School of Law, Montana, and the United States.

== Personal life and death ==
Haines was married to Janet Haines and had three children. He was active in music, singing for many years with the Missoula Symphony Chorale and a church choir. During his retirement, he wrote This Side of Heaven, a book about the history of human migration into North America.

Haines died at St. Patrick Hospital in Missoula, on September 22, 2026, at the age of 87.

Legal offices
Preceded by Renato Beghe	Judge of the United States Tax Court; 2003–2009	Succeeded by Kathleen Kerrigan
