= Justice Williams =

Justice Williams may refer to:

- Ben T. Williams (c. 1911–1982), associate justice of the Oklahoma Supreme Court
- Charles K. Williams (1782–1853), chief justice of the Vermont Supreme Court
- Elias Hewitt Williams (1819–1891), associate justice of the Iowa Supreme Court
- F. A. Williams (1851–1945), associate justice of the Texas Supreme Court
- Frank J. Williams (1879–1949), chief justice of the Supreme Court of Rhode Island
- Fred L. Williams (1879–1949), associate justice of the Supreme Court of Missouri
- G. Mennen Williams (1911–1988), associate justice and chief justice of the Michigan Supreme Court
- George Henry Williams (1823–1910), chief justice of the Oregon Supreme Court
- Harold P. Williams (1882–1963), associate justice of the Massachusetts Supreme Judicial Court
- Hugh Williams (judge) (born 1939), judge of the High Court of New Zealand
- John Williams (archbishop of York) (1582–1650), Lord High Chancellor of England
- Joseph Williams (justice) (1801–1870), chief justice of the Iowa Supreme Court
- Joshua Williams (lawyer) (1837–1915), New Zealand lawyer, politician, Supreme Court judge and university chancellor
- L. Judson Williams (1856–1921), associate justice of the Supreme Court of Appeals of West Virginia
- Marshall Jay Williams (1837–1902), associate justice of the Ohio Supreme Court
- Robert L. Williams (1868–1948), chief justice of Oklahoma
- Roy Hughes Williams (1874–1946), associate justice of the Ohio Supreme Court
- Samuel Cole Williams (1864–1947), associate justice of the Tennessee Supreme Court
- Thomas Lanier Williams I (1788–1856), associate justice of the Tennessee Supreme Court
- Thomas Scott Williams (1777–1861), chief justice of the Connecticut Supreme Court
- William Muir Williams (1850–1916), associate justice of the Supreme Court of Missouri

== See also ==
- Judge Williams (disambiguation)
