= Charles Sandham =

British Army officer (1781–1869)

Charles Freeman Sandham (12 October 1781 – 14 February 1869) was a British Army officer who fought during the Napoleonic Wars and commanded a Brigade of Artillery at the Battle of Waterloo on 18 June 1815.

== Biography ==
After service in Holland in 1799 he was part of the 1807 Copenhagen Expedition. Present at four engagements during the Walcheren Campaign, he subsequently served under Sir John Moore during the 1809 retreat from Corunna. Sandham campaigned in Holland, Flanders and France during 1814 before commanding a Brigade of the Royal Artillery at the Battle of Waterloo on 18 June 1815. During the battle, his Brigade were armed with five 9-pounder cannons and one 5 1/2" howitzer. Sources claim that "the first shot fired by the allied artillery at Waterloo was fired by Sandham's brigade."

In 1833 he was appointed Deputy Lieutenant of Sussex.

After his death he was buried in the churchyard of St. Marys in Washington, Sussex.

== Bibliography ==
- Bromley, Janet; Bromley, David (2015). Wellington's Men Remembered Volume 2: A Register of Memorials to Soldiers who Fought in the Peninsular War and at Waterloo- Volume II: M to Z. Pen and Sword. ISBN 978-1-4738-5768-1.
- Dalton, Charles (1904). The Waterloo roll call. With biographical notes and anecdotes. London: Eyre and Spottiswoode.
