= Royal Waggon Train =

- RWT
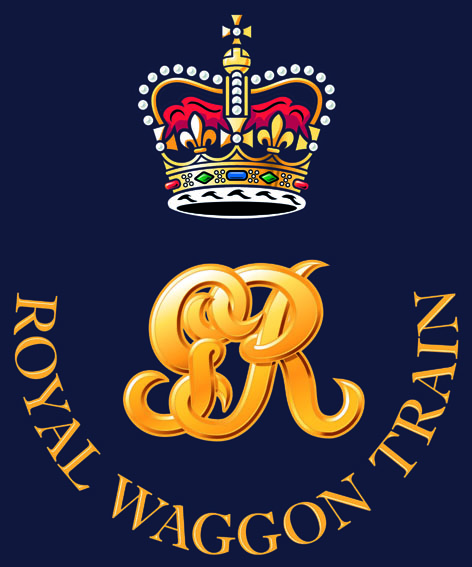
- The badge of the Royal Waggon Train from 1792 to 1832
- Active: 1793–1833
- Country: Great Britain; United Kingdom
- Branch: British Army
- March: William of The Waggon Train
- Battle honours: Peninsula; Waterloo

The Royal Waggon Train was the name originally given to the logistical branch of the British Army.

== Origins and the Royal Waggoners ==
In 1793, Revolutionary France invaded the Low Countries and declared war on Britain. Existing military plans relied on local men to provide supplies and transport for the British Army overseas, which proved to be inadequate. Therefore, the first uniformed Transport Corps, named the Royal Waggoners, was created on 7 March 1794. One year later, after British forces withdrew from the Low Countries, the Royal Waggoners were disbanded.

== Royal Waggon Train (1802–1832) ==
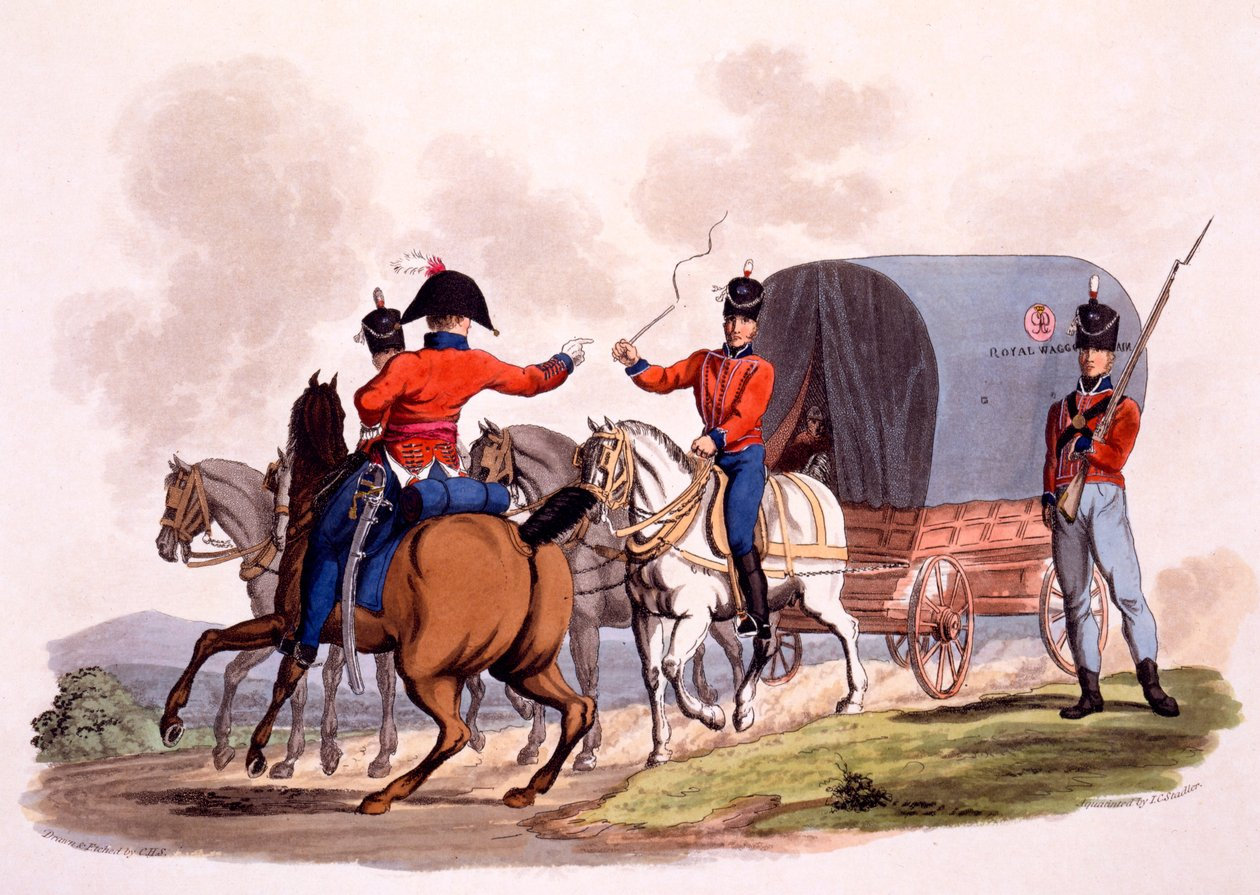
1812 engraving of the unit

In 1799, Sir Ralph Abercromby led a British expedition into North Holland to break the French hold on the strategically important Scheldt estuary. Another Transport Corps, overseen by Waggon Master General Digby Hamilton, Lieutenant Colonel (later Colonel), was created to support this effort. Initially titled the Royal Waggon Corps, it was renamed the Royal Waggon Train, ranking as a "Mounted Corps" after the 29th Dragoons. Due to the success of Abercrombie's expedition, the Royal Wagon Train of five Squadrons was reinforced by a further seven Squadrons/troops and Hamilton was promoted to Major General.

The train was required because civilian transport was controlled by the Treasury rather than the military, which did not always suit the army's requirements. It was more sophisticated than the existing transport used by the Army Medical Department and was able to ferry many of the wounded, injured and sick to safety in large convoys. However, the convoys were limited by the technology of the age; wagons were prone to breakdown and often unable to cope with rough and tortuous terrain of the battlefield and lines of communication. The animals pulling the wagons frequently died of starvation or exhaustion.

== Peninsular War ==
The Train was heavily involved in the Peninsular War, supporting Sir Arthur Wellesley's forces as they sailed from Ireland to retake the French naval base at Lisbon in 1808. After command of the British forces temporarily passed to Sir John Moore in the winter of 1809, the Train was again involved, shepherding the wounded and transporting supplies for British forces in the retreat at Corunna; a 300-mile (480 km) trek through treacherous conditions that ended in a triumphant battle against Napoleon's forces. Moore did not survive the battle, but his tactics and planning allowed many of his forces to evacuate Spain and set sail for England.

At Wellington's request, Commissary General John Bissett was then brought in to oversee the Royal Waggon Train. By 1810, newly ennobled Viscount Wellington had ordered the construction of the Lines of Torres Vedras; a series of secret forts that repelled an offensive by French commander André Masséna. Other key successes at the Siege of Badajoz between March and April 1812, the Battle of Salamanca in July of the same year, and the Storming of Saint Sebastian in August 1813 allowed Wellington's forces to drive Napoleon's forces back into France. The Royal Waggon Train was responsible for transporting supplies and wounded during these key battles and throughout the Peninsular War. With public opinion against him, Emperor Napoleon was forced to abdicate on 31 March 1814, leading to his exile on the island of Elba.

For its efforts in the Peninsular War, the Royal Waggon Train was awarded the battle honour "Peninsula", and over thirty officers were also awarded the bar "Corunna" for the Army Gold Medal.

== Waterloo ==
After Napoleon's exile, the Royal Waggon Train was reduced to five Troops. However, a year later Napoleon escaped Elba and resumed power, rekindling hostilities with the British. Plans to rebuild the Train were fast-tracked; Wellington well-aware of its importance to military success overseas. The Train expanded once more to twelve Troops, which included 1,400 horses.

On 18 June 1815, allied British and Prussian forces faced Napoleon's army at the Battle of Waterloo. Eight companies from the Royal Waggon Train were involved, along with four companies of the Foreign Waggon Train. During the battle, allied forces took up defence of Hougoumont, a chateau and farm 5 kilometres (3.1 mi) south of Waterloo. Along with supporting the front lines, the Royal Waggon Train drove much-needed supplies through enemy lines to the desperate Third Guard defending the chateau. The Train's heroics at Hougoumont were included in Sir Arthur Conan Doyle's 1891 play Waterloo.

Wellington's forces were outnumbered and outgunned, withstanding a barrage of attacks from French forces throughout the day. That evening, Prussian forces led by Field Marshal Gebhard Leberecht von Blücher broke through Napoleon's right flank. This planned attack allowed Britain and her remaining allied forces to counter-attack, driving the French Army from the battlefield. For their service during the battle, the Royal Waggon Train received their second battle honour: "Waterloo"

Victory at Waterloo brought an end to the Napoleonic Wars, and with it, 22 years of conflict between France and much of Europe. After the battle, the Royal Waggon Train was responsible for clearing over 4,000 allied dead from the battlefield. Napoleon abdicated shortly after and was exiled on Saint Helena, a mid-Atlantic island, where he remained until his death in 1821.

Following Napoleon's defeat, the Train was reduced to five troops, primarily utilised for mundane transport tasks. By 1818, only two troops remained, with one stationed in Gibraltar. The Train was finally disbanded in 1833.

== Legacy ==
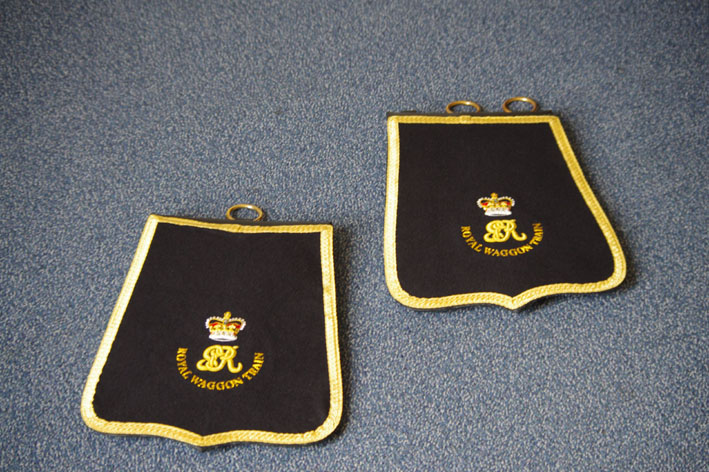
Ceremonial officer's sabretaches 1812 used at Croydon

No person can be more impressed than I am of the absolute necessity of a corps of the description of the Royal Waggon Train

— Field Marshal Arthur Wellesley, 1st Duke of Wellington.

A prolonged peace followed for Britain, until the beginning of the Crimean War in 1854. After the Train's disbandment, logistical support fell solely onto the Commissariat's shoulders. British forces suffered, as the refined infrastructure of the Royal Waggon Train was no more.

The Headquarters of the Royal Waggon Train is at Croydon and two hundred years later it is still the headquarters of 151 Regiment Royal Logistic Corps.
