= Robert Ruwe =

American judge (1941–2022)

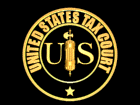

Robert Paul Ruwe (July 3, 1941 – February 12, 2022) was a judge of the United States Tax Court.

Ruwe was born in Cincinnati, Ohio, and graduated from Roger Bacon High School, St. Bernard, Ohio, in 1959. He earned his BA at Xavier University, Cincinnati, Ohio, in 1963, and was a Special Agent for the Intelligence Division of the Internal Revenue Service from 1963-70. In 1970, he received his J.D. from Salmon P. Chase College of Law in 1970, graduating first in class. He then joined the Office of Chief Counsel for the Internal Revenue Service in 1970, and held the following positions with the IRS: Trial Attorney (Indianapolis), Director, Criminal Tax Division, Deputy Associate Chief Counsel (Litigation), and Director, Tax Litigation Division. He was appointed by President Ronald Reagan as Judge, United States Tax Court, on November 20, 1987, for a term ending November 19, 2002. Ruwe retired on November 20, 2002, but continued to perform judicial duties as having senior status on recall until November 30, 2020. Ruwe died on February 12, 2022.

== Attribution ==
Material on this page was copied from the website of the United States Tax Court, which is published by a United States government agency, and is therefore in the public domain.
