= Bearhole Ditch (Dirickson Creek tributary) =

Bearhole Ditch Tributary to Dirickson Creek
- Location within Delaware Location within the United States

Location
- Country: United States
- State: Delaware
- County: Sussex

Physical characteristics
- Source: Vines Creek divide
  - location: about 1 mile north of Selbyville, Delaware
  - coordinates: 38°29′19″N 075°13′07″W
  - elevation: 40 ft (12 m)
- Mouth: Dirickson Creek
  - location: about 0.1 miles north of Johnson, Delaware
  - coordinates: 38°28′50″N 075°08′11″W
  - elevation: 0 ft (0 m)
- Length: 4.57 mi (7.35 km)
- Basin size: 7.78 square miles (20.2 km^{2})
- Discharge
  - average: 9.11 cu ft/s (0.258 m^{3}/s) at mouth with Dirickson Creek

Basin features
- Progression: generally east
- River system: Little Assawoman Bay
- Tributaries
  - left: unnamed tributaries
  - right: unnamed tributaries
- Bridges: DE 17; Gum Road; Hudson Road; Deer Run Road; Bearhole Road; Johnson Road; DE 20

Bearhole Ditch is a 4.57 mi (7.35 km) long 2nd order tributary to Dirickson Creek, in Sussex County, Delaware.

== Variant names ==
According to the Geographic Names Information System, it has also been known historically as:

- Bear Hole Ditch
- Dirickson Creek

== Course ==
Bearhole Ditch rises on the Vines Creek divide about 1 mile north of Selbyville in Sussex County, Delaware. Bearhole Ditch then flows generally east to meet Dirickson Creek about 0.1 miles north of Johnson, Delaware.

== Watershed ==
Bearhole Ditch drains 7.78 square miles (20.2 km^{2}) of area, receives about 44.8 in/year of precipitation, has a topographic wetness index of 723.32 and is about 3.5% forested.

== See also ==
- List of rivers of Delaware
