= Williamston =

Williamston is the name of several places in the United States of America:

- Williamston, Michigan
- Williamston, North Carolina
- Williamston, South Carolina
