= Williamsville, Sussex County, Delaware =

Unincorporated community in Delaware, United States

Williamsville, Delaware
- Unincorporated community
- Location within Delaware Location within the United States
- Coordinates: 38°27′36″N 75°08′00″W
- Country: United States
- State: Delaware
- County: Sussex
- Elevation: 30 ft (9.1 m)
- Time zone: UTC-5 (Eastern (EST))
  - Summer (DST): UTC-4 (EDT)
- Area code: 302
- GNIS feature ID: 216251

Williamsville is an unincorporated community in Sussex County, Delaware, United States. Williamsville is located on Delaware Route 54 between Selbyville and Fenwick Island.

It was the site of the Williamsville Colored School.
