= List of University of Houston people =

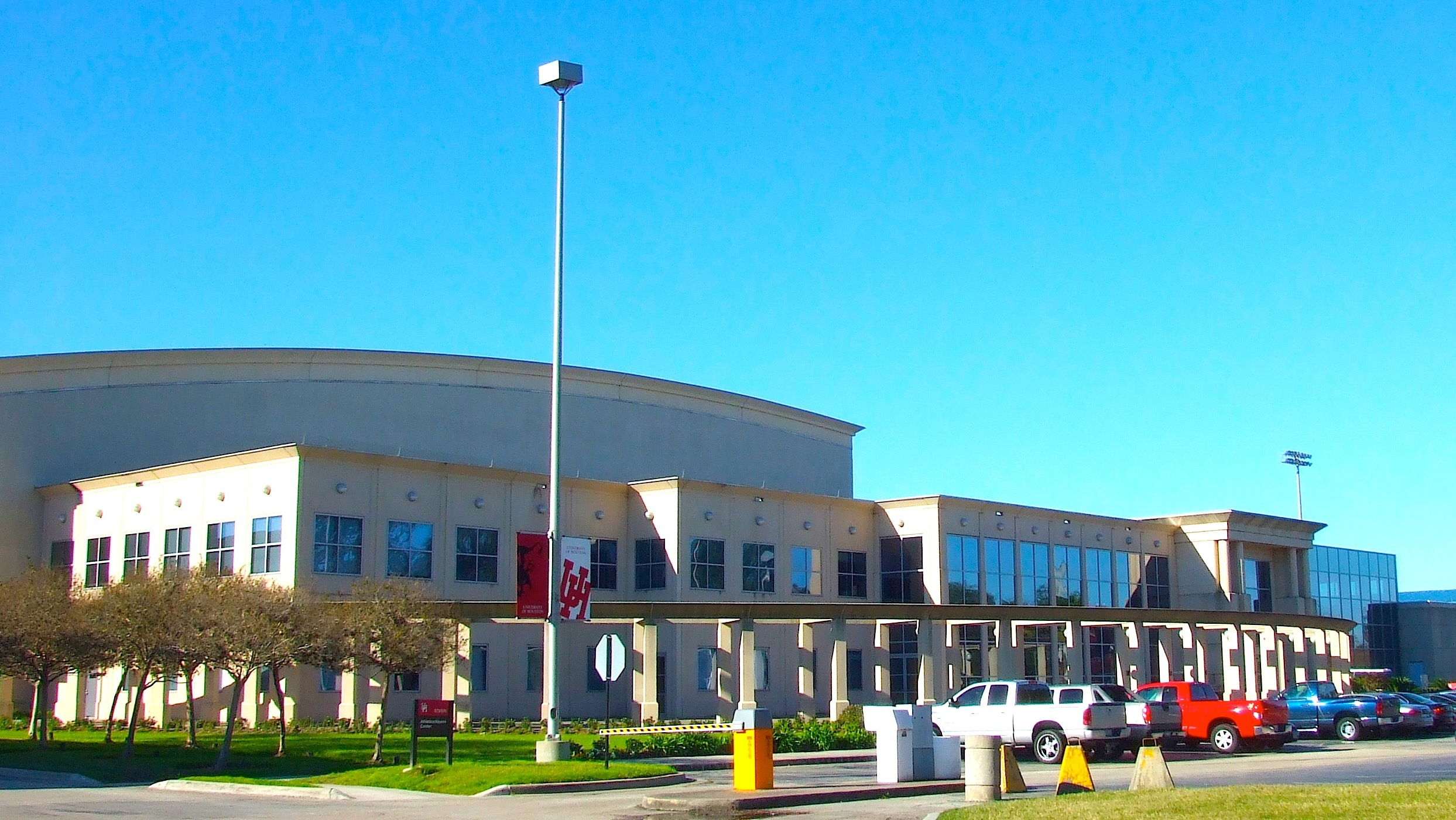
The Athletics/Alumni center at the University of Houston

The list of University of Houston people includes notable alumni, former students, and faculty of the University of Houston. Class years usually indicate the year of a graduation unless an entry is denoted by an asterisk (*). In this case, the student did not graduate from the university, and the class year indicates the last known year a former student attended. In the case of alumni with multiple graduation years, the earliest graduation year is shown.

== Legend ==
The following abbreviations and notes are used to represent UH schools and colleges:

Abbr.	Meaning
ARCH	Gerald D. Hines College of Architecture and Design
ARTS	Kathrine G. McGovern College of the Arts
BAUER	C.T. Bauer College of Business
EDU	College of Education
CULLEN	Cullen College of Engineering
HONORS	Honors College
HILTON	Conrad N. Hilton College of Global Hospitality Leadership
LAW	University of Houston Law Center
CLASS	College of Liberal Arts & Social Sciences
NSM	College of Natural Sciences & Mathematics
NURSING	College of Nursing
MED	Tilman J. Fertitta Family College of Medicine
OPT	College of Optometry
PHARM	College of Pharmacy
SOCIAL	Graduate College of Social Work
TECH	College of Technology
HOBBY	Hobby School of Public Affairs
FS	Former student (did not graduate)

== Alumni ==
=== Academia ===
Name	Class year	School	Degree	Notability	Reference
C. Anthony Anderson	1965, 1964	NSM	M.S., B.S.	Philosopher; professor of Philosophy at the University of California, Santa Barbara	
Robert L. Bradley, Jr.	1980	CLASS	M.A.	Expert on public energy policy	
James H. Bray	1980, 1978, 1976	CLASS	Ph.D., M.A., B.S.	Former president of the American Psychological Association	
Brené Brown	2002, 1996	SOCIAL	Ph.D., M.S.W.	Scholar and researcher in social work; author, speaker, and professor at University of Houston	
Max Castillo	1979	EDU	Ed.D	Former president of the University of Houston–Downtown and San Antonio College	
Juliet V. García	1970	CLASS	M.A., B.A.	President, University of Texas at Brownsville; was awarded the Presidential Medal of Freedom	
Robert W. Lawless	1964	NSM	B.S.	Former president of Texas Tech University and the University of Tulsa	
Michael D. McKinney	1973		B.S.	13th chancellor of The Texas A&M University System and former Texas House representative	
William A. Staples	1977	BAUER	D.B.A.	President of the University of Houston–Clear Lake	
Arleigh B. Templeton	1961,1949	EDU	Ph.D, M.Ed.	First president of the University of Texas at San Antonio; former president of Sam Houston State University, the University of Texas at El Paso, and Alvin Community College	
Welcome W. Wilson, Sr.	1949	BAUER	B.B.A.	Real estate developer and former chairman of the University of Houston System Board of Regents	

=== Arts and media ===
==== Architecture ====
Name	Class year	Notability	Reference(s)
Laura Bennett	1993	Contestant, Season 3 of the television show Project Runway	
Neil Denari	1980	Architect, professor	
Burdette Keeland	1950	Modernist architect, professor	
Jerrold E. Lomax	1951	Architect	
Joe Mashburn	1978	Dean, Hines College of Architecture	

==== Entertainment and performing arts ====
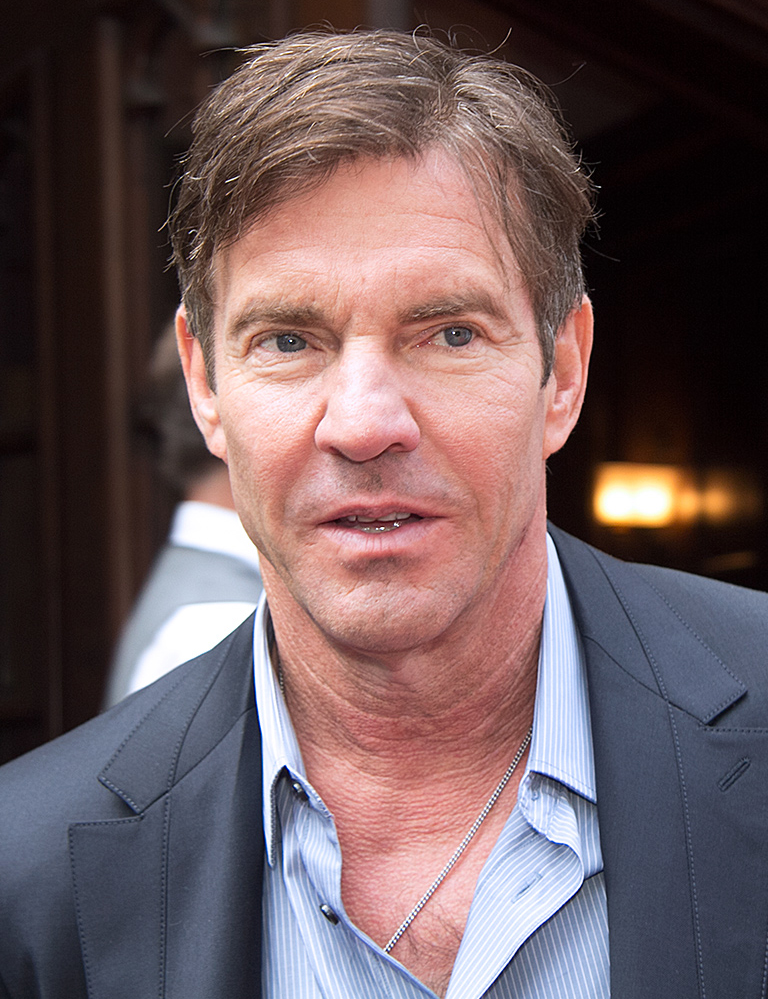
Dennis Quaid, actor

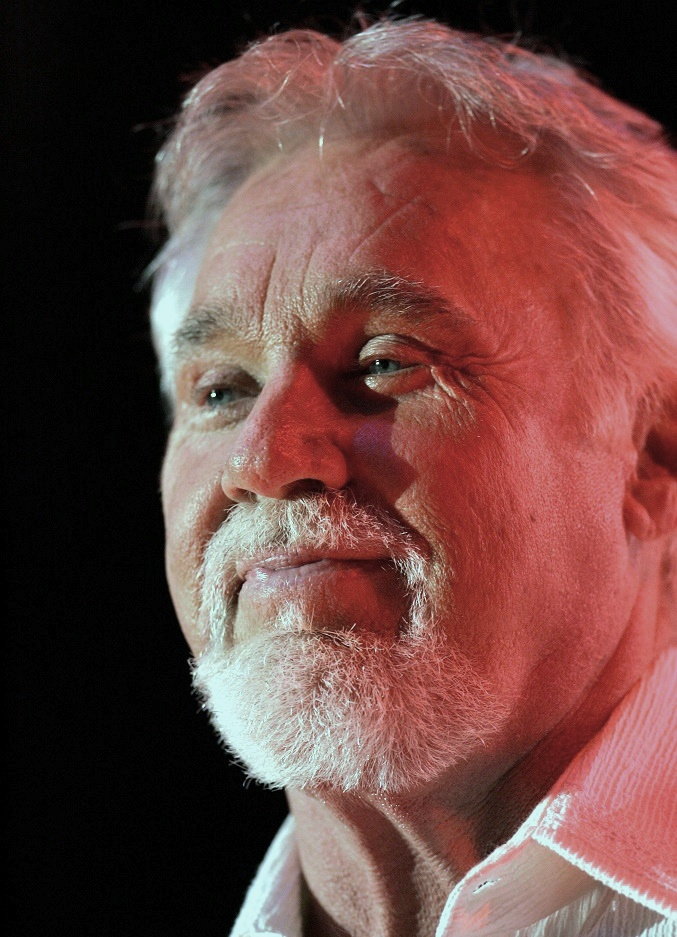
Kenny Rogers, country music singer

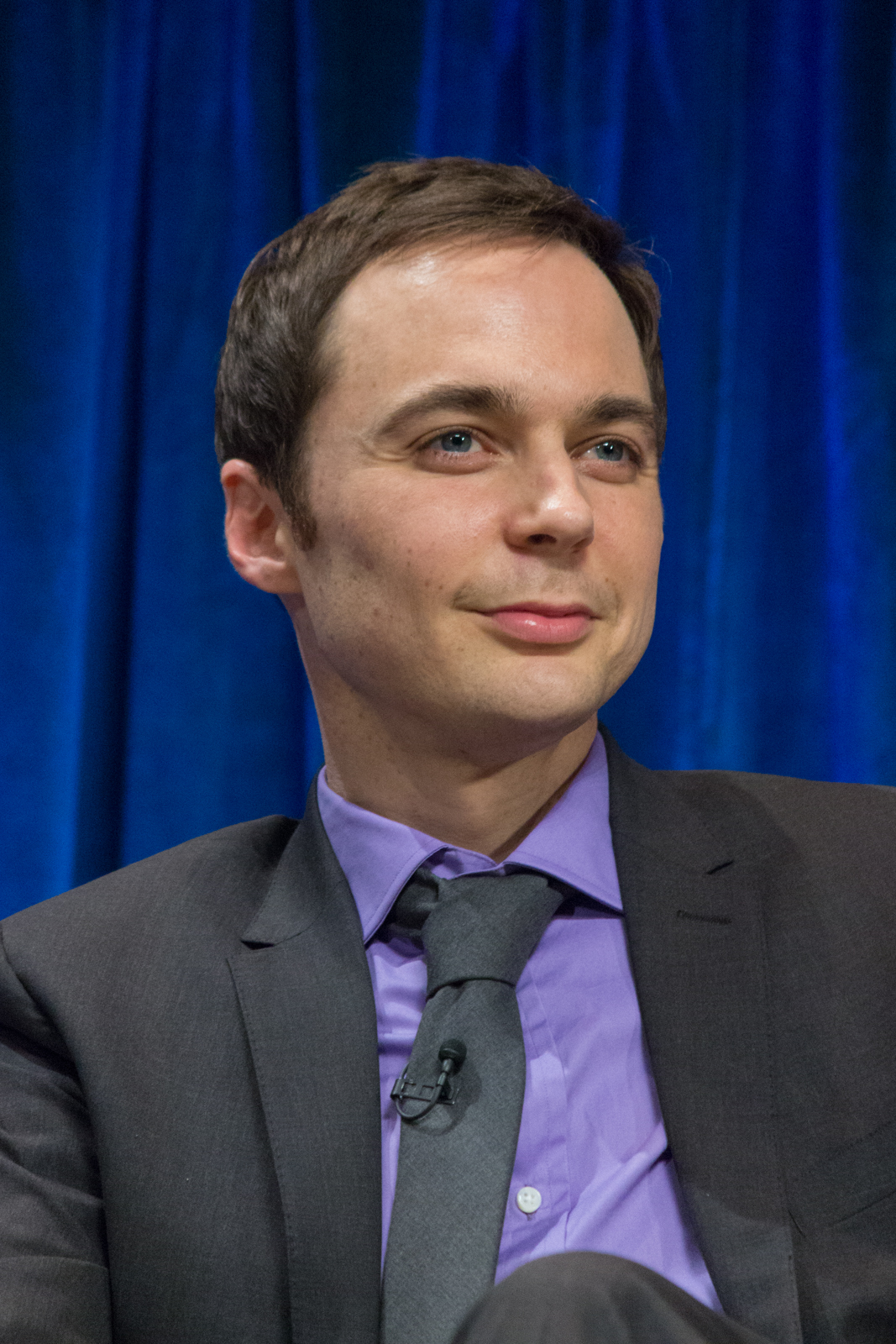
Jim Parsons, actor

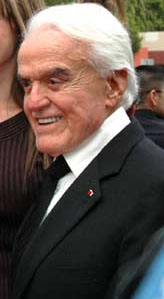
Jack Valenti, former president, Motion Picture Association of America

Name	Class year	Notability	Reference(s)
Jason Alkire		Fashion designer at Haus Alkire, artist	
Greg Baldwin		Actor	
Leila Bela		Experimental musician, actress, and writer	
Shelly Berg	1977	Jazz pianist and educator	
Big Moe (Kenneth Moore)		Rapper	
Larry Blyden	1948	Stage and television actor	
Craig Bohmler	1980	Opera and musical-theater composer	
Joe Bowman*	mid-1940s	Marksman and western entertainer	
Peter Breck		Actor	
Kenneth Broberg	2016	Classical pianist	
J. T. Buck		Theatre director, composer, lyricist (The Gospel According to Tammy Faye)	
Marcelo Bussiki	1993	Conductor	
Tom Byron		Adult-film actor	
Tony Campise		Jazz saxophonist	
Derek Cecil		Actor	
Chamillionaire*		Rapper	
Johnny Chan*	1978	Poker player	
Brett Cullen	1979	Actor	
Chloe Dao*		Season 2 contestant on Project Runway	
Loretta Devine	1971	Actress, NAACP Image Award recipient	
Magen Ellis		Beauty queen	
Fat Tony (Anthony Obi)		Hip-hop artist	
Bruce Ford*	1982	Operatic tenor	
Larry Gatlin	1970	Grammy-winning country singer and songwriter	
Denyce Graves*	1990	Operatic mezzo-soprano	
Keith Grimwood	1974	Bass player for Trout Fishing in America	
Terreon Gully		Jazz drummer	
Julie Haus		Fashion designer at Haus Alkire	
Bill Hicks*		Comedian, social critic	
Kimberly Holland	2004	Playboy model	
Larry Hovis		Actor	
Paavo Järvi*		Orchestra conductor	
Christina Kelly	2015	Voice actress	
Liza Koshy*	2015	Comedian, actress, YouTube personality	
Evelyn Lim	1994	Concert organist, educator	
Annie Lin		Singer-songwriter	
Lizzo		Rapper, singer-songwriter	
Anne Lundy	1979	Classical conductor, music educator	
Master P*		Hip-hop artist, actor, producer, and athlete	
Sally Mayes		Broadway singer and actress, rock/jazz singer	
Susanne Mentzer*	1982	Operatic mezzo-soprano	
Yvar Mikhashoff	1967	Composer, concert pianist, recording artist, music educator	
Erie Mills*	1979	Operatic soprano	
Mary Mills*	1988	Operatic soprano	
Carli Mosier		Voice actress	
Pauline Oliveros*	1952	Electronic music composer and performance artist	
Bárbara Padilla	2004	Opera singer	
Jim Parsons	1996	Emmy and Golden Globe Award-winning actor, The Big Bang Theory	
Chris Patton		Voice actor	
Cindy Pickett	1972	Actress	
Dennis Quaid*	1974	Actor	
Randy Quaid	1971	Actor; winner of Golden Globe Award; nominated for Emmy and Academy Awards	
Kenneth Radnofsky		Classical saxophonist, educator	
Timothy Rhea	1999	Director of Bands at Texas A&M University	
Kenny Rogers*	1958	Country singer; winner of multiple Grammy, American Music, Country Music Association, Academy of Country Music, and CMT Awards; USA Today "Favorite Singer of All Time"	
Brad Rushing	1986	Cinematographer	
Julian Schnabel	1973	Filmmaker; winner of Best Director prize at Cannes Film Festival; visual artist	
Elliot Segal		Disc jockey	
Guru Singh		Actor	
Brent Spiner*	1974	Actor	
Crystle Stewart	2007	Miss USA 2008	
Billy Stritch*	1981	Jazz composer, arranger, pianist	
Allison Sumrall		Voice actress	
DJ Sun		Record producer, DJ	
Christopher Theofanidis	1992	Classical composer	
John Tracy	1968	Television director	
Tommy Tune	1964	Broadway dancer, actor, Tony Award winner	
Jack Valenti	1946	President of the Motion Picture Association of America	
Townes Van Zandt*	1966	Country and folk music singer-songwriter	
Viper		Rapper	
Paul Wall	2001	Rapper and DJ	
Judy Wilson		Casting director	
Trey Wilson		Actor	
Darren Keith Woods	1982	Opera singer, general director of Fort Worth Opera	
Roger Wright	1996	Classical pianist and 2004 National Scrabble Championship winner	
Robert Wuhl	1976	Comedian, actor, and writer	
Arthur Yoria		Guitarist, singer-songwriter	
Terence Yung	2012	Concert pianist	
Stella Zambalis*	1984	Operatic soprano	
Jessica Zhu	2009	Concert pianist	

==== Journalism ====
Jim Nantz, lead CBS Sports broadcaster

Name	Class year	Notability	Reference(s)
Dan Cook*	1945	Longtime San Antonio television sports reporter and columnist	
Steve Edwards*		Talk-show host	
Fred Faour	1987	Sports commentator, talk-show host	
Robert Flores	1992	ESPN anchor	
Saul Friedman	1956	Newspaper reporter, columnist, wrote "Gray Matters" column for Newsday	
Kevin James	1988	Radio host, conservative political commentator	
Tom Jarriel	1956	Correspondent for 20/20 and ABC's evening news	
Star Jones	1986	Former co-host of the TV show The View	
Shane McAuliffe	2003	Creator and host of television program The Texas Bucket List	
Maxine Mesinger		Gossip columnist for the Houston Chronicle	
Jim Nantz	1981	Lead CBS Sports broadcaster	
Chau Nguyen	2010	Television news anchor	
Dan Rather*		Former managing editor and anchor for CBS Evening News	
Caroline Valenta*	1945	Pulitzer-nominated photojournalist at the Houston Post	
Bill Worrell	1969	Sportscaster	
Steve Zabriskie		Network television play-by-play sportscaster, ABC, ESPN, CBS	

==== Literature ====
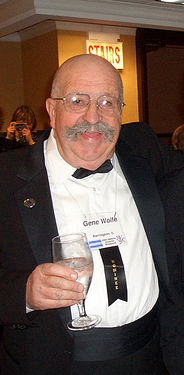
Gene Wolfe, science-fiction author

Name	Class year	Notability	Reference(s)
Donald Barthelme*	1957	Author, UH professor	
Shane Bolks	1997	Author of chick lit and historical romance novels	
Jericho Brown	2007	Poet, winner of 2020 Pulitzer Prize for Poetry, MacArthur "Genius Grant"	
Kathryn Casey	1984	Author, journalist	
Katherine Center	1998	Author	
Thomas Cobb		Author	
Jill Alexander Essbaum	1994	Poet, writer, professor	
Ibis Gómez-Vega	1976	Writer, critic	
Jennifer Grotz	2005	Poet	
Christine Hà	2013	Writer, poet, editor; chef who won the grand prize on the MasterChef cooking competition on Fox in 2012	
Mary Lynne Gasaway Hill	1997	Poet, writer, professor at St. Mary's University, Texas and fellow of the Royal Society of Arts	
Detrick Hughes	1989	Poet	
Lacy M. Johnson	2008	Writer	
Corey Marks	2000	Poet	
Leslie Adrienne Miller	1991	Poet	
Vassar Miller	1947	Poet	
David M. Parsons	1991	Poet, 1991 Poet Laureate of Texas	
George Sessions Perry*	—	Novelist, correspondent	
Padgett Powell		Author; professor at University of Florida	
Tom Reiss	1991	Pulitzer Prize-winning author, historian, journalist	
Cynthia D. Ritchie		Writer, filmmaker, social activist	
Cristina Rivera Garza	1995	Author, professor, won 2024 Pulitzer Prize	
Pattiann Rogers	1981	Poet	
Allie Rowbottom		Writer, educator	
Alice Sebold*	1985	Novelist	
Lynda Schraufnagel	1987	Poet	
Larry D. Thomas	1970	Poet, 2008 Texas State Poet Laureate	
Vanessa Angélica Villarreal	2011	Poet, essayist, and cultural critic	
Sidney Wade	1994	Poet, professor	
Bryan Washington	–	Writer	
Gene Wolfe	1956	Science fiction novelist	
Robert Clark Young		Author	

==== Visual arts ====
Name	Class year	Notability	Reference(s)
Michelle Barnes	1970	Artist and arts administrator	
Susan Budge	1987	Ceramic sculptor	
Michael Ray Charles	1993	Painter	
Michael Galbreth	1984	Contemporary performance, conceptual, visual artist	
Priscilla Hamby	2003	Illustrator, comic-book artist	
Cheryl Kelley	—	Photorealist painter	
Jack Massing	1984	Contemporary performance, conceptual, visual artist	
Eileen Maxson	2002	Video and installation artist	
Julian Schnabel	1973	Neo-expressionist painter, sculptor, photographer, and filmmaker	
Sheryl Sims		Quilter and Alexandria, Virginia Commissioner for the Arts	
Nestor Topchy	1987	Painter, sculptor, installation artist	

=== Athletics ===
==== Baseball ====
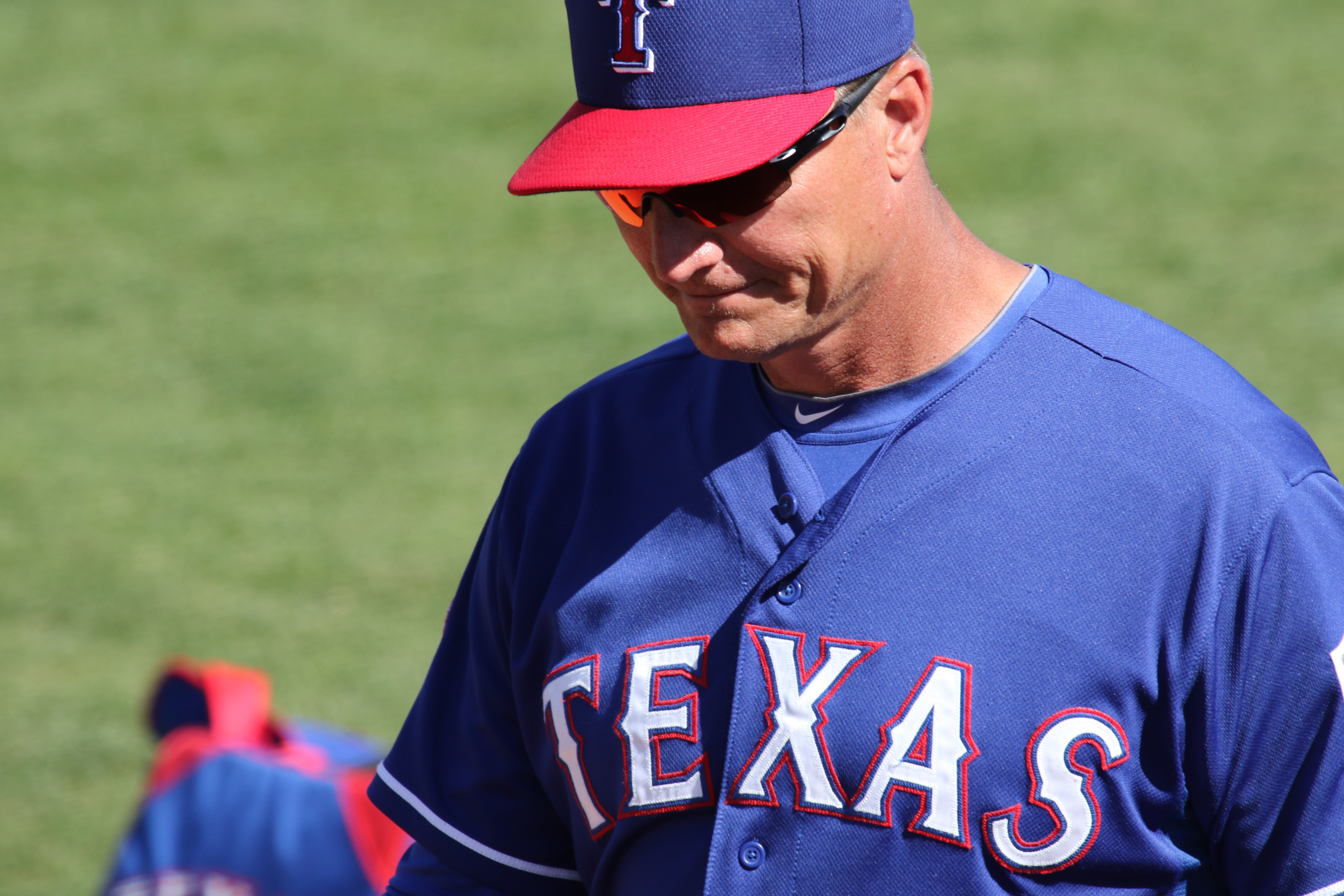
Jeff Banister, manager of the Texas Rangers

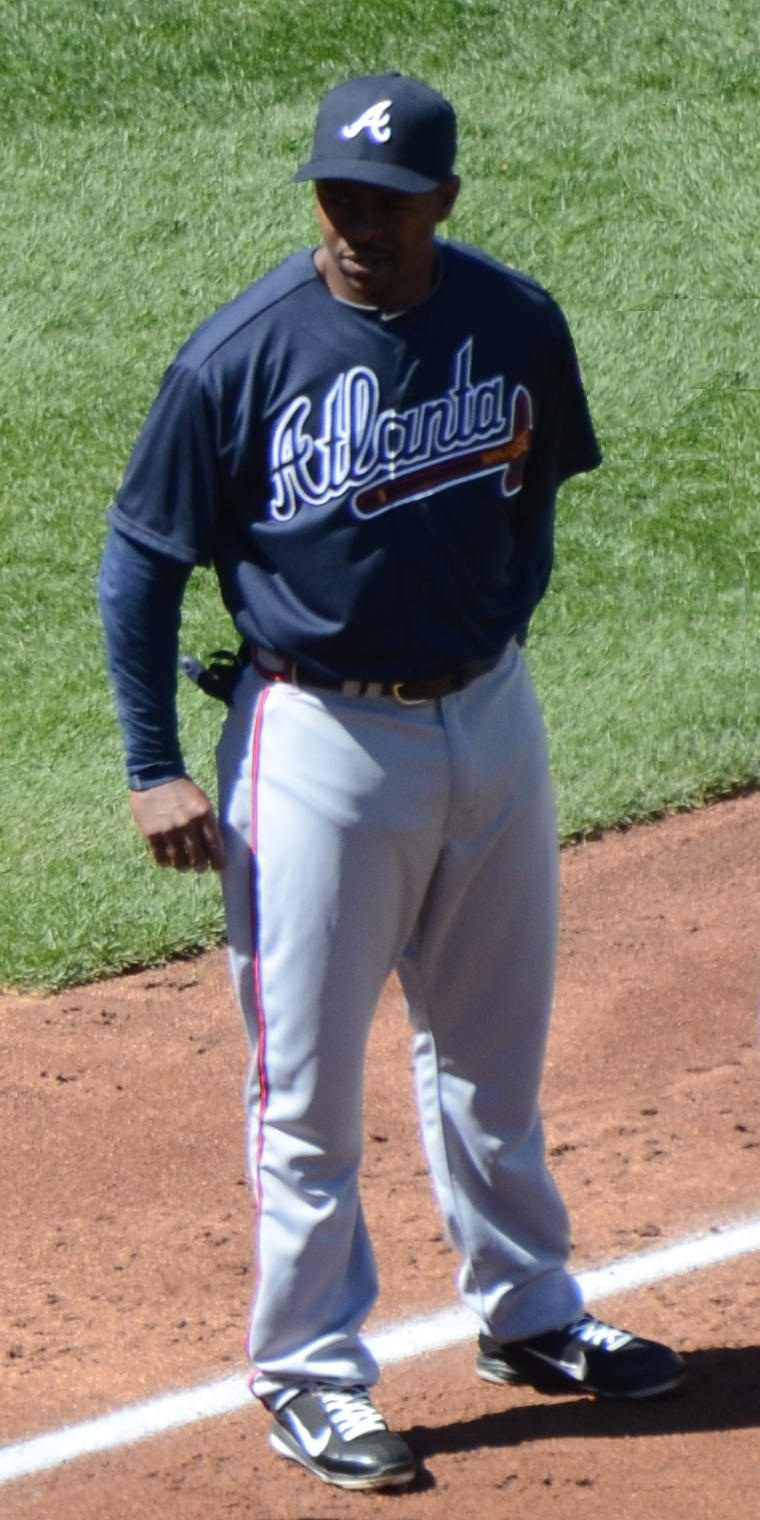
Michael Bourn, baseball outfielder

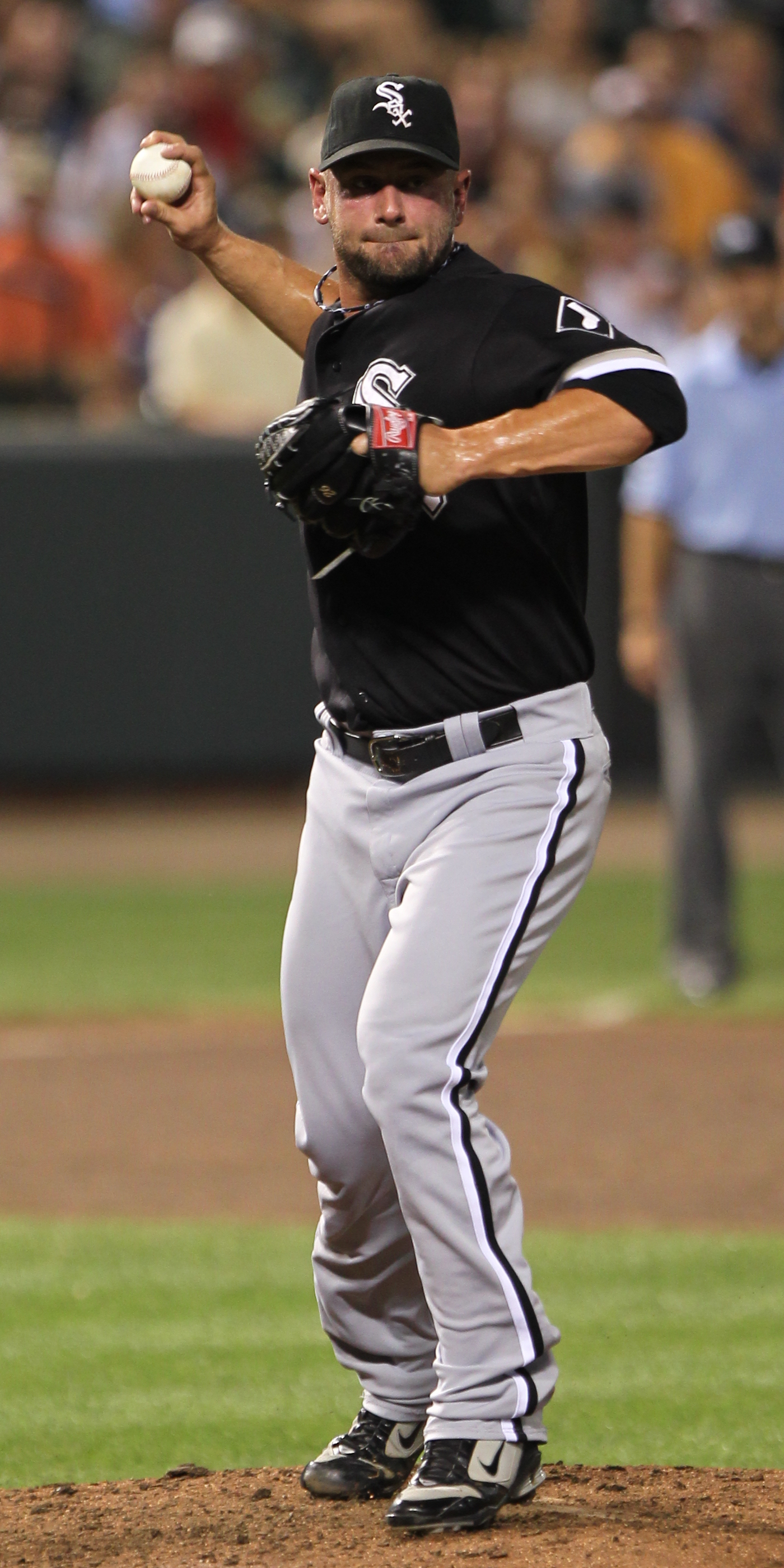
Jesse Crain, baseball pitcher

Name	Class year	Notability	Reference(s)
John Altobelli	1987	Minor league player, college coach; died in helicopter crash with Kobe Bryant	
Jeff Banister	1986	Manager, Texas Rangers; perfect 1.000 major-league career batting average	
Matt Beech	1994	Former pitcher for the Philadelphia Phillies	
Beau Bell		Infielder for St. Louis Browns, Detroit Tigers, Cleveland Indians	
Michael Bourn	2003	Outfielder for Houston Astros/Atlanta Braves	
Jesse Crain	2002	Best career start for a relief pitcher	
Steve Cummings	1986	Former pitcher for the Toronto Blue Jays	
Steve Decker*		Transferred from UH to Triton College; catcher for San Francisco Giants, Florida Marlins, Colorado Rockies, Anaheim Angels	
Larry Dierker		Pitcher for Houston Astros, St. Louis Cardinals	
Doug Drabek	1983	1990 Cy Young Award winner, 1994 All-Star	
Josh Ekness*	2023	Pitcher for Miami Marlins	
Vaughn Eshelman	1991	Former pitcher for the Boston Red Sox	
Joe Gallagher	1951	Professional baseball player and college baseball coach	
Robert Gasser*	2021	Pitcher for Milwaukee Brewers	
Wayne Graham	1973	Head coach of Rice Owls baseball	
Bill Henry	1946	Pitcher, 1960 All-Star	
Nick Hernandez*	2016	Pitcher for San Diego Padres, Houston Astros	
Antoine Jean*	2025	Minor-league pitcher	
Rob Johnson	2004	Catcher for Seattle Mariners	
Donnie Joseph	2009	Pitcher for Kansas City Royals	
Corey Julks*	2015	Player for Detroit Tigers	
John King	2017	Pitcher for Texas Rangers, St. Louis Cardinals, Miami Marlins	
Jake Lemoine*	2015	Pitcher for Oakland Athletics	
Brad Lincoln*	2006	Pittsburgh Pirates pitcher	
Jason McDonald	1993	Oakland Athletics player	
Garrett Mock	2004	Pitcher for Washington Nationals	
Shane Nance	2000	Former Milwaukee Brewers and Arizona Diamondbacks pitcher	
Rayner Noble	1988	Reached AAA level as player; later UH head baseball coach	
John Paciorek		Played one game for Houston Colt .45s; holds MLB record for most plate appearances (5) while compiling a 1.000 career batting average	
Tom Paciorek	1968	1981 All-Star; National College Baseball Hall of Fame	
David Pierce	1985	Head coach at Tulane, Rice	
Austin Pruitt	2013	Pitcher for Texas Rangers	
Seth Romero*	2017	Pitcher for Washington Nationals	
Jake Scheiner		Infielder/outfielder for Hiroshima Toyo Carp	
Scott Sheldon	1991	Oakland Athletics and Texas Rangers infielder	
Chris Snyder	2002	Arizona Diamondbacks, Pittsburgh Pirates, and Houston Astros catcher	
Chris Tremie	1992	Houston Astros catcher	
Jared Triolo*	2019	Infielder for Pittsburgh Pirates	
Ryan Wagner	2003	First Cincinnati Red to be drafted and reach the majors in the same season	
Mike Walker	1986	Former pitcher for the Seattle Mariners	
Ben Weber	1991	2002 World Series champion	
Patrick Weigel*	2015	Player for Atlanta Braves	
Gary Weiss	1978	1981 World Series champion	
Rocket Wheeler		Minor league player and manager	
Todd Whitting	1995	UH head baseball coach	
Woody Williams	1988	1993 World Series champion, 2003 All-Star	
Connor Wong*	2017	Player for Boston Red Sox	
Anthony Young	1987	Had Major League Baseball's longest losing streak	

==== Basketball ====
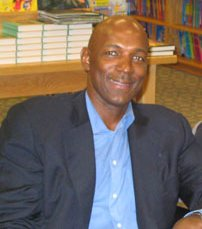
Clyde Drexler, former basketball shooting guard, ten-time NBA All-Star, and Basketball Hall of Fame member

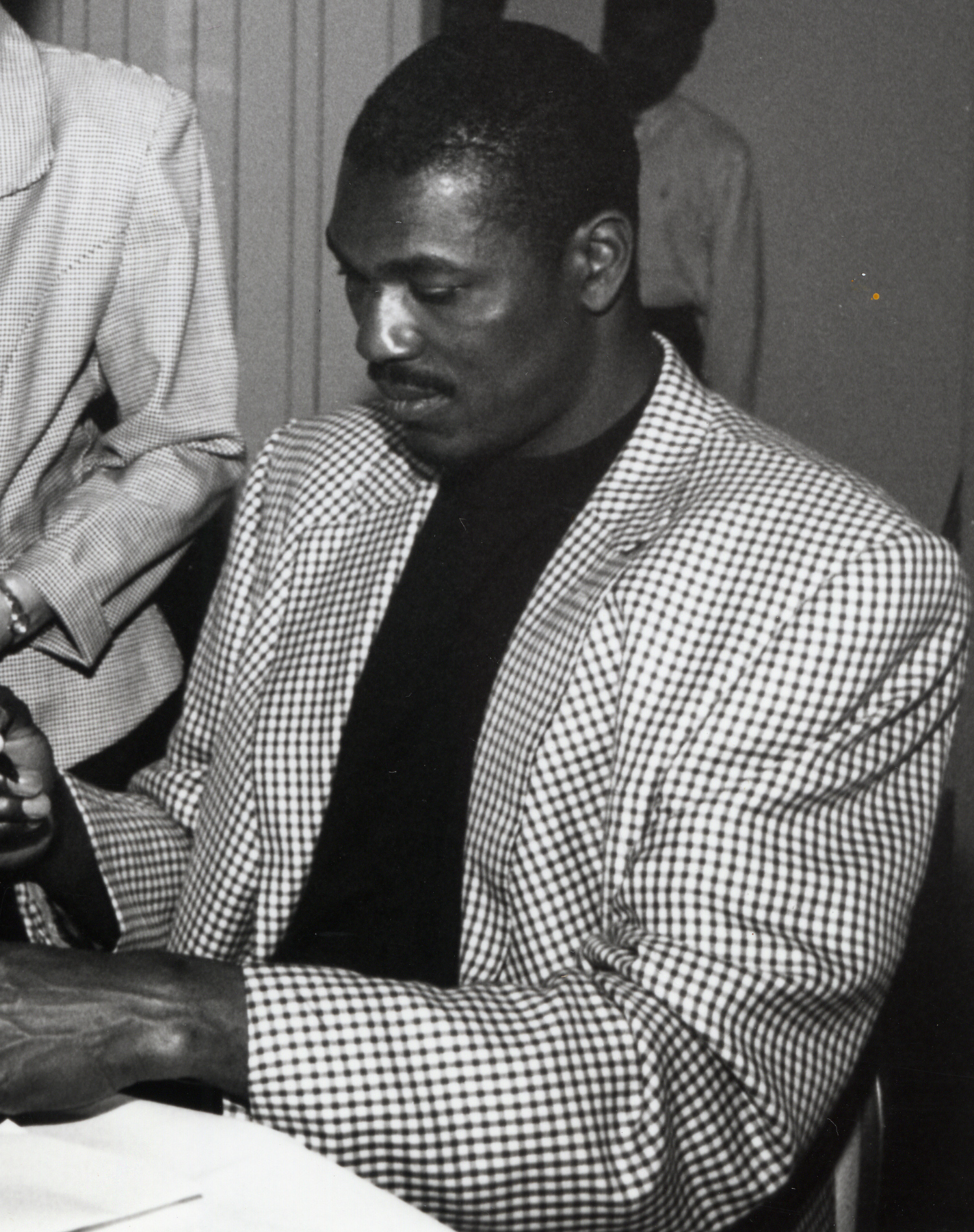
Hakeem Olajuwon, former basketball center, twelve-time NBA All-Star, and Basketball Hall of Fame member

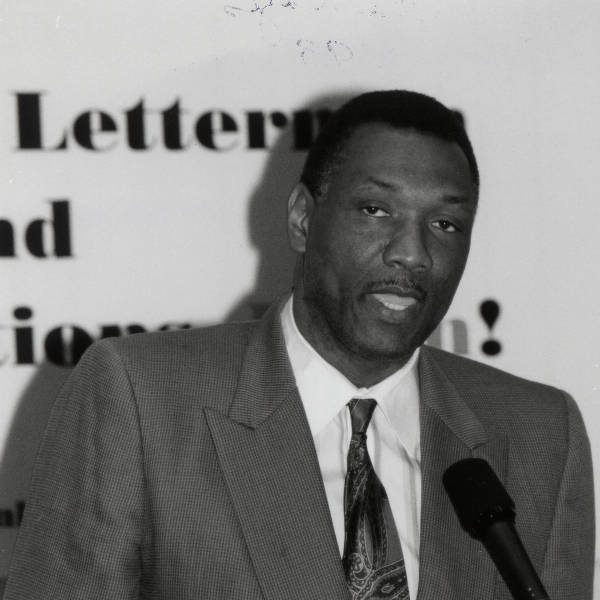
Elvin Hayes, former basketball center, twelve-time NBA All-Star, and Basketball Hall of Fame member

Name	Class year	Notability	Reference(s)
Benny Anders*	1985	Member of Phi Slama Jama; later played in South America	
Greg "Cadillac" Anderson	1987	Player for San Antonio Spurs/Milwaukee Bucks/New Jersey Nets/Denver Nuggets/Detroit Pistons/Atlanta Hawks	
Terrance Arceneaux*	2025	transferred from UH to North Carolina State	
Otis Birdsong	1977	Player for Kansas City Kings/New Jersey Nets/Boston Celtics	
Armoni Brooks*	2019	Player for Houston Rockets	
Randy Brown*	1988	Transferred from Houston to New Mexico State; player for Sacramento Kings/Chicago Bulls/Boston Celtics/Phoenix Suns; coach for Bulls	
Josh Carlton	2022	Player for Le Mans Sarthe Basket	
Chris Cenac*	2026	Player for Boston Celtics	
Don Chaney	1968	Player for Boston Celtics/Spirits of St. Louis (ABA)/Los Angeles Lakers; Head Coach of the New York Knicks, Houston Rockets, Detroit Pistons, and Los Angeles Clippers; 1969 NBA Finals and 1974 NBA Finals champion, 1991 NBA Coach of the Year Award winner	
Aubrey Coleman	2010	Led NCAA Division I Men's Basketball in scoring for 2009–2010 season; player for Aliağa Petkim of Turkish Basketball League/Austin Toros of NBA Development League/Pallacanestro Biella of Italian League	
Marcus Cousin	2010	Player for Utah Jazz	
LJ Cryer	2024	Player for Golden State Warriors	
Doug Davalos	1994	Head basketball coach at Sul Ross State University, Texas State University	
Corey Davis Jr.	2019	Player for Afyon Belediye S.K. of the Basketball Super League	
Devin Davis	2018	Player for Lakeland Magic/G.S. Lavrio B.C./ESSM Le Portel	
Dwight Davis	1972	Player for Cleveland Cavaliers/Golden State Warriors	
Sergio De Randamie	2006	Player for ABC Amsterdam/Donar/Landstede Hammers/BV Den Helder/Apollo Amsterdam/Rotterdam/ZZ Leiden	
Arafan Diané*	current student		
David Díaz	1993	Player for Venezuelan national team	
Damyean Dotson	2017	Player for New York Knicks	
Dion Dowell	2008	Player for Golden State Warriors	
Clyde Drexler	1983	Player for Portland Trail Blazers/Houston Rockets; 1995 NBA Finals Champion, NBA's 50th Anniversary All-Time Team, 2004 Naismith Memorial Basketball Hall of Fame Player inductee; gold medal, 1992 Olympic Games	
Louis Dunbar	1975	Player for Harlem Globetrotters	
Kyler Edwards	2022	Player for San Antonio Spurs, player in Israeli Basketball Premier League	
Anwar Ferguson	2004	Player for Saitama Broncos	
Rolando Ferreira	1988	Player for Portland Trail Blazers	
Kingston Flemings*	2026	Player for Atlanta Hawks	
Alton Ford	2004	Player for Phoenix Suns/Houston Rockets	
Ja'Vier Francis	2025		
Reid Gettys	1989	Member of Phi Slama Jama, player for Albany Patroons	
Anthony Goldwire	2020	Player for Charlotte Hornets/Denver Nuggets/San Antonio Spurs/Washington Wizards/New Jersey Nets/Minnesota Timberwolves/Detroit Pistons/Milwaukee Bucks/Los Angeles Clippers; earned UH degree after professional career	
Or Goren	1980	Player for Hapoel Megido, Hapoel Gvat/Yagur, Hapoel Ramat Gan, Elitzur Netanya, Hapoel Galil Elyon, Beitar Tel Aviv, and Maccabi Hadera	
Justin Gorham	2021	Player in the Israeli Basketball Premier League	
Rob Gray	2017	Finished UH career as all-time AAC scoring leader; player for JL Bourg Basket	
Quentin Grimes*	2021	Player for New York Knicks/Detroit Pistons/ Dallas Mavericks/Philadelphia 76ers/Los Angeles Lakers	
Joe Hamood	1966	Player for Houston Mavericks (ABA)	
Isiah Harwell*	2026	transferred from UH to Gonzaga	
Elvin Hayes	1968	Player for San Diego/Houston Rockets, Baltimore/Capital/Washington Bullets; player in the "NCAA Game of the Century", 1978 NBA Finals Champion, 1990 Naismith Memorial Basketball Hall of Fame Player inductee, NBA's 50th Anniversary All-Time Team member	
Carl Herrera	1990	Player for Houston Rockets/San Antonio Spurs/Vancouver Grizzlies/Denver Nuggets; 1994 NBA Finals and 1995 NBA Finals Champion	
Nate Hinton*	2020	Player for Dallas Mavericks	
Danuel House Jr.*	2014	Player for Washington Wizards/Phoenix Suns/Houston Rockets	
DeJon Jarreau	2020	Player for Memphis Grizzlies	
Ronnie Johnson*	2016	Player for Niagara River Lions	
Chandi Jones	2004	Player for Detroit Shock/Minnesota Lynx	
Damon Jones	1998	Player for New Jersey Nets/Boston Celtics/Golden State Warriors/Dallas Mavericks/Vancouver Grizzlies/Detroit Pistons/Sacramento Kings/Milwaukee Bucks/Miami Heat/Cleveland Cavaliers	
Dwight Jones	1973	Player for Atlanta Hawks/Houston Rockets/Chicago Bulls/Los Angeles Lakers	
Oliver Lafayette	2007	Player for Boston Celtics	
Monica Lamb-Powell*	1985	Player for Houston Comets	
Leary Lentz	1970	Player for Houston Mavericks/New York Nets (both ABA)	
Guy Lewis	1947	UH head basketball coach (see Faculty and staff section below)	
Kelvin Lewis	2010	Player for Houston Rockets Summer League team/Texas Legends of the NBA Development League	
Ted Luckenbill	1961	Player for Philadelphia/San Francisco Warriors	
Sancho Lyttle	2005	Player for Atlanta Dream	
Sam Mack	1992	Player for San Antonio Spurs/Houston Rockets/Vancouver Grizzlies/Golden State Warriors/Miami Heat	
Larry Micheaux	1983	Player for Kansas City Kings/Houston Rockets	
Caleb Mills*	2021	Transferred from UH to Florida State	
Zamal Nixon	2011	Player for Hertener Loewen/Nürnberg Falcons BC/Flyers Wels/Phoenix Hagen/G.S. Lavrio B.C./Limoges CSP/USC Heidelberg/Riesen Ludwigsburg/Promitheas Patras B.C.	
Hakeem Olajuwon*	1984	Player for Houston Rockets/Toronto Raptors; 1994 NBA MVP, 1994 NBA Finals and 1995 NBA Finals Champion, 1994 and 1995 NBA Finals MVP, NBA's 50th Anniversary All-Time Team; Gold Medal, 1996 Olympic Games; 2008 Hall of Fame inductee	
Charles "Bo" Outlaw	1993	Player for Los Angeles Clippers/Orlando Magic/Phoenix Suns/Memphis Grizzlies	
Andre Owens	2005	Player for Utah Jazz	
Gary Phillips	1961	Player for Boston Celtics/San Francisco Warriors	
Devonta Pollard	2016	Player for BK Liepājas Lauvas/Koroivos B.C./Al Sadd Basketball Team/Niagara River Lions/Pioneros de Los Mochis	
George Reynolds	1969	Player for Detroit Pistons	
J'Wan Roberts	2023		
Galen Robinson Jr.	2019	Player for Austin Spurs	
Dave Rose	1983	Member of Phi Slama Jama; head basketball coach at Brigham Young University	
Walker Russell*	1980	Player for Detroit Pistons/Atlanta Hawks/Indiana Pacers; coach for Toronto Raptors; scout for New York Knicks	
Marcus Sasser*	2023	Player for Detroit Pistons	
Emanuel Sharp	2026		
Jamal Shead	2024	Player for Toronto Raptors	
Jaaron Simmons*	2014	Transferred to Ohio; player for Union Neuchâtel Basket	
Jonathon Simmons*	2012	Player for San Antonio Spurs/Orlando Magic	
Byron Smith	1991	Head coach, Prairie View A&M	
Ken Spain	1969	Player for Pittsburgh Condors (ABA)	
Ollie Taylor	1970	Player for New York Nets/San Diego Conquistadors/Carolina Cougars (all ABA)	
Álvaro Teherán	1991	Player in Colombia	
Dedan Thomas Jr.*	current student		
TaShawn Thomas*	2014	Transferred to Oklahoma; player for Hapoel Jerusalem B.C.	
Jahmar Thorpe	2007	Player for BG Göttingen/Austin Spurs/Vilpas Vikings/Bakken Bears/Changan Group Guangdong/Saigon Heat/Forssan Koripoiat/Saint-Brieuc Basket Cotes D'Armor/Randers Cimbria/Link Tochigi Brex/Levanga Hokkaido/Basket Esch/Sun Rockers Shibuya/Iwate Big Bulls/Osaka Evessa/Bambitious Nara/Tokyo Hachioji Bee Trains/Kumamoto Volters/Kawasaki Brave Thunders/Saga Ballooners/Sendai 89ers/Rizing Zephyr Fukuoka/Alvark Tokyo/Kanazawa Samuraiz	
Louis Truscott	2003	Player for Gary Steelheads/London Towers/Asheville Altitude/BC Mureș	
Joseph Tugler*	current student		
Milos Uzan	2026		
Wesley Van Beck	2018	Player for South Bay Lakers/Tigrillos Medellín/Palmer Alma Mediterránea/BC Kalev/Niners Chemnitz/Petkim Spor/La Laguna Tenerife	
Jarace Walker*	2023	Player for Indiana Pacers	
Fabian White Jr.	2022	Player for South Bay Lakers	
Rob Williams	1982	Player for Denver Nuggets	
Rickie Winslow	1987	Player for Milwaukee Bucks	
Joe Young*	2013	Transferred after sophomore year at UH to Oregon; player for Indiana Pacers	
Michael Young	2003	Player for Phoenix Suns/Philadelphia 76ers/Los Angeles Clippers (finished UH degree after NBA career)	

==== Bobsled ====
Name	Class year	Notability	Reference(s)
Seun Adigun	2009	Bobsledder	
Ngozi Onwumere	2014	Bobsledder	

==== Bodybuilding ====
Name	Class year	Notability	Reference(s)
Lee Labrada	1984	Bodybuilder, nutritionist; IFBB Mr. Universe weight-class world champion 1985, twice runner-up in Mr. Olympia international competition	

==== Breakdancing ====
Name	Class year	Notability	Reference(s)
Jeffrey Louis	2018	Olympic breakdancer, aka B-Boy Jeffro	

==== Football ====
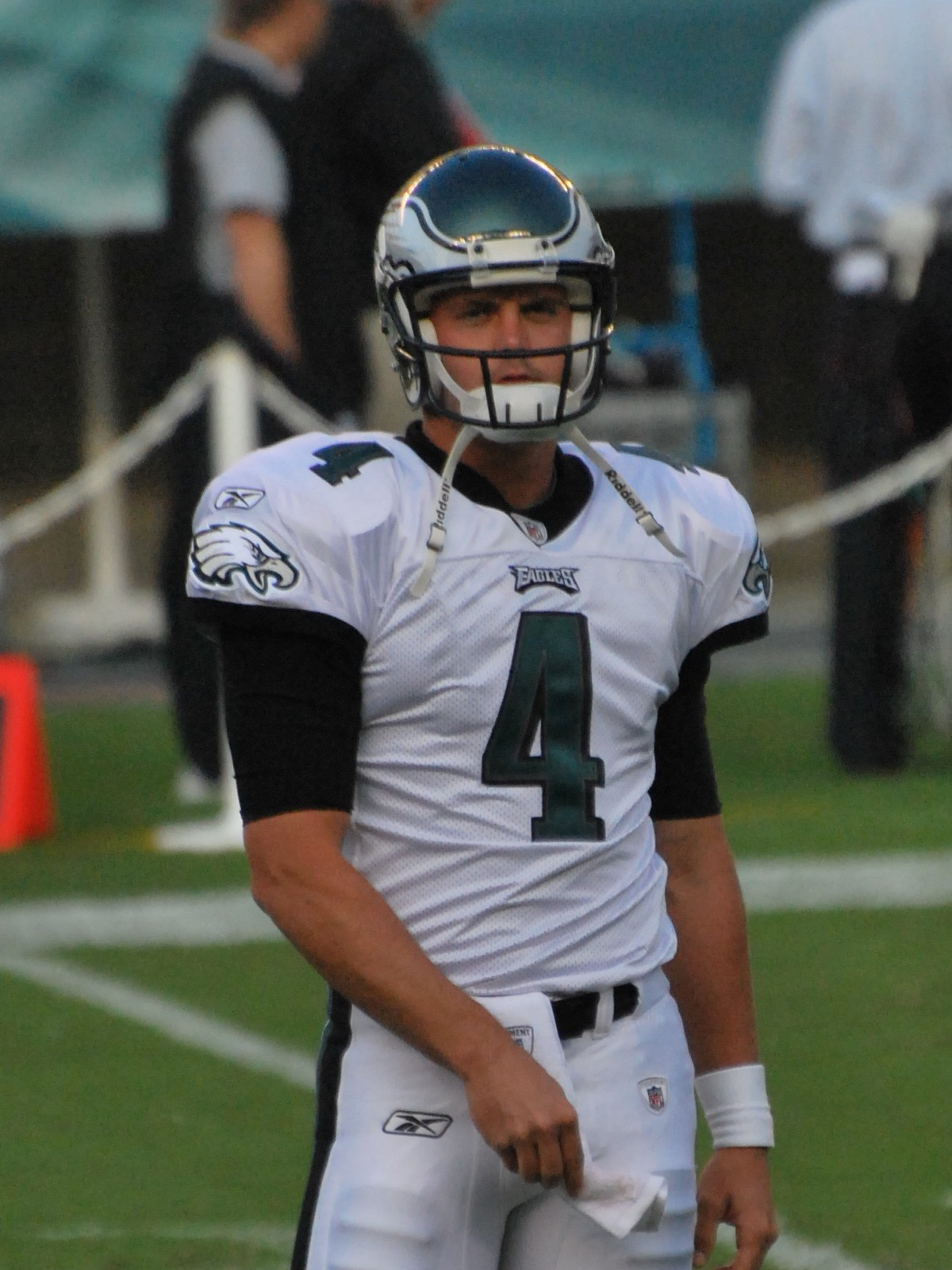
Kevin Kolb, football quarterback

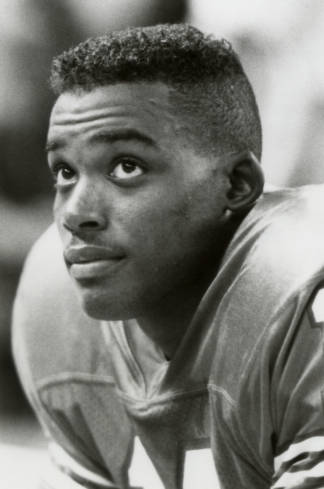
Andre Ware, former football quarterback, Heisman Trophy recipient, College Football Hall of Fame member, sports analyst

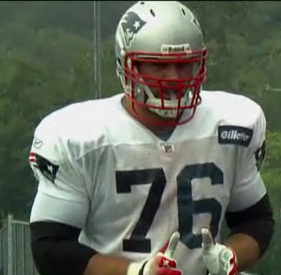
Sebastian Vollmer, football offensive tackle

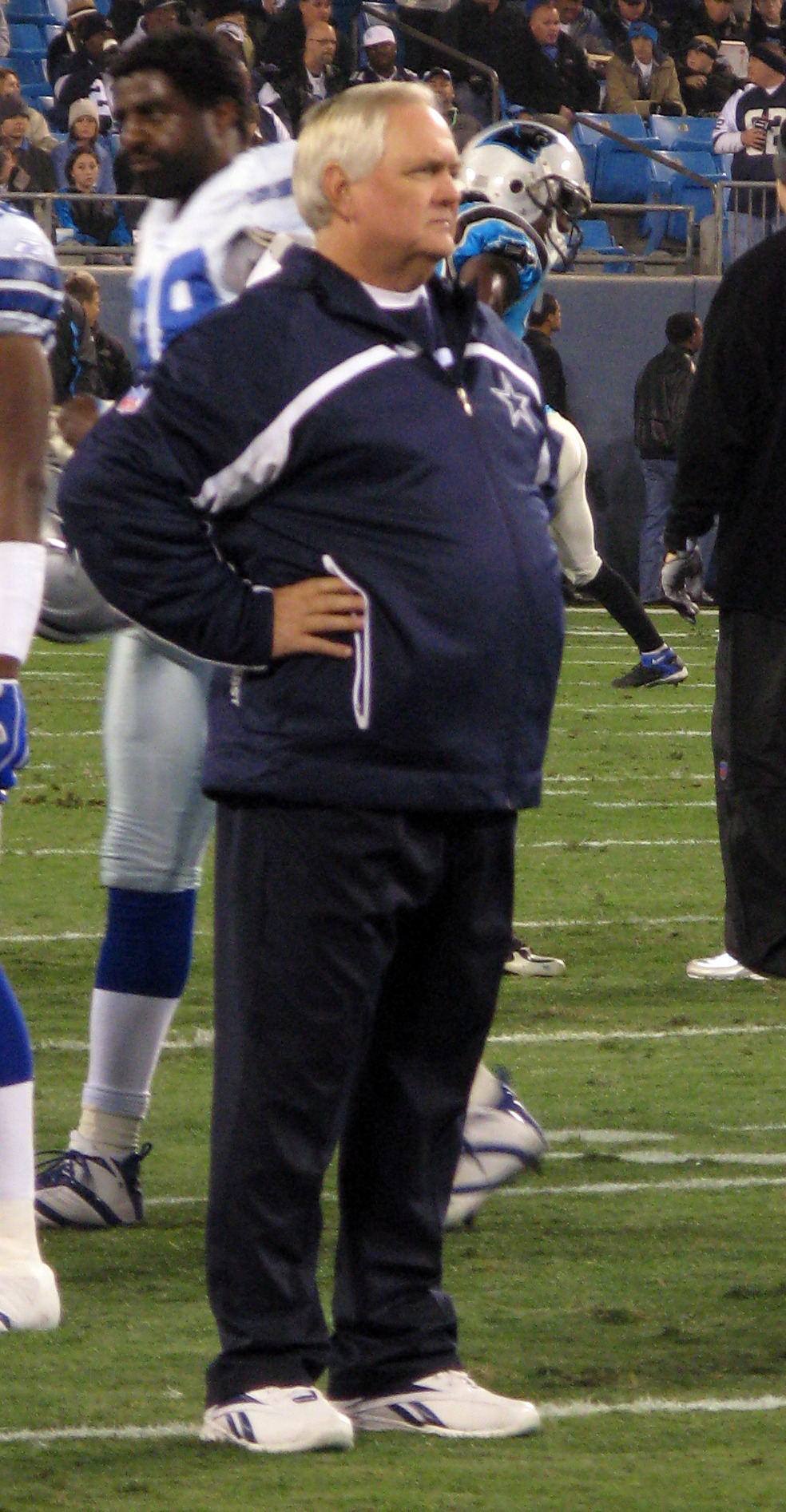
Wade Phillips, football defensive coordinator, former head coach of the Dallas Cowboys, Denver Broncos, and Buffalo Bills

Name	Class year	Notability	Reference(s)
Matthew Adams	2018	Linebacker, Indianapolis Colts	
Willis Adams	1982	Wide receiver, Cleveland Browns	
Allen Aldridge	2002	Lineman, Denver Broncos/Detroit Lions	
Dalva Allen	1957	Lineman, Houston Oilers/Oakland Raiders, 1960 AFL Championship and 1961 AFL Championship winner	
Kyle Allen	2017	Quarterback, Carolina Panthers/Washington Football Team	
Anthony Alridge	2008	Wide receiver, Denver Broncos (also played running back while at UH)	
Kimble Anders	—	Fullback, Kansas City Chiefs, 1995 Pro Bowl, 1996 Pro Bowl, and 1997 Pro Bowl player	
Roman Anderson	1992	Kicker, Sacramento Gold Miners/San Antonio Texans (CFL)	
David Anenih	2022	Linebacker, Phoenix Cardinals	
Donnie Avery	2008	Wide receiver, St. Louis Rams	
Demarcus Ayers*	2015	Wide receiver, Pittsburgh Steelers	
Joey Banes	—	Lineman, Indianapolis Colts	
Don Bass	—	Tight end, Cincinnati Bengals/New Orleans Saints	
Jackie Battle	—	Running back, Dallas Cowboys/Kansas City Chiefs	
Tom Beer	1971	Tight end, Denver Broncos/Boston–New England Patriots	
Val Belcher	1977	Lineman, Ottawa Rough Riders/Winnipeg Blue Bombers (CFL)	
Adriano Belli	2001	Lineman, Atlanta Falcons/New York Giants/Cleveland Browns (NFL); Las Vegas Outlaws (XFL); BC Lions/Montreal Alouettes/Hamilton Tiger-Cats/Toronto Argonauts (CFL)	
Earl Bennett	2022	Director of player development, Vanderbilt Commodores football; previously played six seasons as wide receiver for NFL Chicago Bears	
Royce Berry	—	Linebacker, Cincinnati Bengals/Chicago Bears	
Dan Birdwell	—	Lineman, Oakland Raiders, 1968 Pro Bowl player	
Alois Blackwell	1978	Running back, Dallas Cowboys	
Anthony Boswell*	Current student	Offensive lineman	
Tyus Bowser	2016	Linebacker, Baltimore Ravens	
Kent Branstetter	1974	Lineman, Green Bay Packers	
Greg Brezina	1970	Linebacker, Atlanta Falcons, 1969 Pro Bowl Player	
Bill Bridges	—	Lineman, Buffalo Bills	
Art Briles*	1977	Head coach at UH and Baylor University	
Kendal Briles	2005	Quarterback, wide receiver in college; assistant coach for Baylor, Florida Atlantic, Houston	
Terrance Broadway*	2012	Quarterback, transferred from UH to Louisiana–Lafayette	
Charlie Brown	—	Offensive tackle, Oakland Raiders	
Don Brown	—	Running back, Houston Oilers	
Guy Brown	—	Linebacker, Dallas Cowboys	
Sam Brown*	2023	Wide receiver; transferred from UH to Miami	
Sammy Brown	2012	Linebacker, St. Louis Rams	
Wilbert Brown	—	Lineman, Tampa Bay Buccaneers/Washington Redskins/New England Patriots	
Reggie Burnette	1991	Linebacker, Green Bay Packers/Tampa Bay Buccaneers	
Bo Burris	—	Defensive back, New Orleans Saints	
Glenn Cadrez	1993	Linebacker, New York Jets/Denver Broncos/Kansas City Chiefs	
Patrick Carr	2020	Running back, Seattle Seahawks, Milano Seamen	
Paul Carr	1956	Defensive back, San Francisco 49ers	
Tyron Carrier	2012	Wide receiver, Montreal Alouettes (CFL)	
Ajani Carter*	2024	Defensive back, Houston Texans	
Nelson Ceaser	2023	Lineman, signed by Seattle Seahawks	
Zeon Chriss*	2025	Quarterback, transferred from UH to Tulane	
Rusty Clark	1970	Quarterback, Edmonton Eskimos, BC Lions	
Bobby Clatterbuck	1953	Quarterback, New York Giants	
Chuck Clements	1996	Quarterback, New York Jets	
Mike Clendenen	1984	Kicker, Denver Broncos	
James Cleveland	2011	Wide receiver, Dallas Cowboys, New Mexico Stars (LSFL)	
Larry Cole*	1967	Lineman, Dallas Cowboys; transferred from Houston to Hawaii	
Jim Colvin	1959	Lineman, Baltimore Colts/Dallas Cowboys/New York Giants	
Dean Connors*	2025	Running back, Los Angeles Rams	
Keith Cooper	2025	Lineman, Detroit Lions	
Billy Cosh	2015	Quarterback; college head coach	
Carl Cunningham	1966	Linebacker, Denver Broncos/New Orleans Saints	
Tank Dell*	2023	Wide receiver, Houston Texans	
Jim Dickey	1957	Head coach, Kansas State Wildcats	
Tom Dimmick	1955	Lineman/linebacker, Philadelphia Eagles/Dallas Texans (AFL)	
James Dixon	1988	Wide receiver, Dallas Cowboys	
Quinten Dormady*	2019	Quarterback, Orlando Guardians (transferred to Central Michigan after one year at UH)	
Steven Dunbar Jr.	2018	Wide receiver, Edmonton Elks	
Patrick Edwards	2012	Wide receiver, Detroit Lions	
Emeke Egbule	2018	Linebacker, Los Angeles Chargers	
Kenneth Farrow	2015	Running back, San Diego Chargers	
Wiley Feagin	1960	Lineman, Baltimore Colts/Washington Redskins	
Simon Fletcher	1984	Lineman, Denver Broncos	
Don Flynn	1956	Defensive back, Dallas Texans (AFL)/New York Jets	
Charlie Ford	1970	Defensive back, Chicago Bears/Philadelphia Eagles/Buffalo Bills/New York Giants	
Robert Ford	1973	Assistant coach for multiple professional and college teams	
Eddie Foster	1976	Split end, Houston Oilers	
Charlie Fowler	1966	Lineman, Miami Dolphins	
Nolan Frese	2015	Long snapper, Seattle Seahawks	
Ben Fricke	1997	Lineman, Dallas Cowboys	
Thomas Gafford	2004	Lineman, Green Bay Packers/Kansas City Chiefs	
Terrance Ganaway*	2008	Running back, New York Jets; transferred from UH to Baylor after his freshman season	
Willie Gaston	2007	Defensive back, Baltimore Ravens	
Steve George	1972	Lineman, St. Louis Cardinals/Atlanta Falcons	
Paul Gipson	1968	Fullback, Atlanta Falcons/Detroit Lions/New England Patriots	
Mike Gisler	1991	Lineman, New England Patriots/New York Jets	
Matthew Golden*	2023	Wide receiver; transferred to Texas	
Mike Green	1999	Running back, Tennessee Titans/Cincinnati Bengals	
Deontay Greenberry*	2014	Wide receiver	
Rex Hadnot	2003	Lineman, Miami Dolphins	
Charlie Hall	1967	Linebacker, Cleveland Browns	
Logan Hall	2021	Lineman, Tampa Bay Buccaneers	
Brandon Hartson	2013	Lineman, Chicago Bears	
A. J. Haulcy*	2025	Defensive back; transferred to LSU	
D. J. Hayden	2013	Defensive back, Oakland Raiders	
Manny Hazard	1991	Wide receiver, Toronto Argonauts; set NCAA record for receptions in a season	
Ken Hebert	1967	Wide receiver, Pittsburgh Steelers	
Clay Helton	1994	Quarterback, became head coach at USC	
Tyson Helton	1999	Quarterback, became head coach at Western Kentucky	
Keisean Henderson*	Current student	Quarterback	
Charlie Hennigan	—	Wide receiver, Houston Oilers (attended UH after football career)	
Jimmy Herndon	1995	Lineman, Jacksonville Jaguars/Chicago Bears/Houston Texans	
Carl Hilton	1985	Tight end, Minnesota Vikings	
Gus Hollomon	1967	Defensive back, Denver Broncos/New York Jets	
A.J. Holmes Jr.*	2024	Defensive lineman; transferred to Texas Tech	
Makhi Hughes*	current student	Running back	
Phillip Hunt	2009	Defensive end, Winnipeg Blue Bombers/Philadelphia Eagles	
David Hunter	2012	Defensive lineman, Houston Texans	
Shadre Hurst*	current student	Offensive lineman	
Joe Bob Isbell	1961	Lineman, Dallas Cowboys/Cleveland Browns	
Johnnie Jackson	1988	Defensive back, San Francisco 49ers/Green Bay Packers	
Tremaine Jackson	2006	Head coach, Prairie View A&M	
William Jackson III	2015	Cornerback, Cincinnati Bengals/Washington Football Team	
Curley Johnson	1956	Lineman/running back/kicker, Dallas Texans (AFL)/New York Jets/New York Giants	
Isaiah Johnson	2018	Cornerback, Oakland Raiders/Pittsburgh Steelers	
Josh Jones	2020	Offensive lineman, Arizona Cardinals/Houston Texans/Baltimore Ravens/Seattle Seahawks	
Marcus Jones	2021	Defensive back, return specialist, New England Patriots	
Melvin Jones	1979	Lineman, Washington Redskins	
Case Keenum	2010	Quarterback, Houston Texans/St. Louis Rams/Los Angeles Rams/Minnesota Vikings/Denver Broncos/Washington Redskins/Cleveland Browns/Buffalo Bills/Chicago Bears; during UH career became all-time NCAA FBS record holder in career passing yards, total offense, passing touchdowns, completions, 300-yard games, 5000-yard seasons	
J. D. Kimmel	1952	Lineman, Washington Redskins/Green Bay Packers	
D'Eriq King	2019	Quarterback, transferred from Houston to Miami, signed by New England Patriots	
David Klingler	1991	Quarterback, Cincinnati Bengals/Oakland Raiders/Green Bay Packers	
Jimmy Klingler	1994	Quarterback, Birmingham Barracudas/Texas Terror	
Wade Koehl		Linebacker, Team Texas	
Kevin Kolb	2006	Quarterback, Philadelphia Eagles/Arizona Cardinals/Buffalo Bills	
Tanner Koziol*	2025	Tight end, Jacksonville Jaguars	
Tom Landry	1952	Defensive back, New York Yankees (AAFC)/New York Giants, 1956 NFL Championship winner; coach, Dallas Cowboys, Super Bowl VI and Super Bowl XII champion, Pro Football Hall of Fame coach inductee (1990), inventor of the 4-3 defense formation	
Lamar Lathon	1989	Linebacker, Houston Oilers/Carolina Panthers, 1996 Pro Bowl player	
Richie Leone	2013	Punter and kicker, BC Lions	
Harold Lewis	1958	Running back/defensive back, Baltimore Colts/Buffalo Bills/Oakland Raiders	
Errol Linden	1960	Lineman, Cleveland Browns/Minnesota Vikings/Atlanta Falcons/New Orleans Saints	
Everett Little	1975	Lineman, Tampa Bay Buccaneers	
Eugene Lockhart	1983	Linebacker, Dallas Cowboys/New England Patriots, 1989 All-Pro Team	
Randy Love	1978	Running back, St. Louis Cardinals	
Josh Lovelady	2000	Lineman, Detroit Lions	
Jesus Machado*	2025	Linebacker, transferred to Rice	
Cameron Malveaux	2016	Lineman, Miami Dolphins	
Vincent Marshall	2007	Wide receiver, Saskatchewan Roughriders/Calgary Stampeders/Winnipeg Blue Bombers	
Dedric Mathis	1995	Defensive back, Indianapolis Colts	
Matt Mattox	2004	Lineman; assistant coach at Houston and Texas	
Jalen Mayo*	Current student	Defensive back	
Joey Mbu	2015	Defensive tackle, Atlanta Falcons	
Alton McCaskill*	2022	Running back; transferred to Colorado	
Latrell McCutchin Sr.	2025	Defensive back	
Marcus McGraw	2012	Linebacker, Arizona Cardinals	
Audray McMillian	1984	Defensive back, Houston Oilers/Minnesota Vikings	
Warren McVea	1967	Running back, Cincinnati Bengals/Kansas City Chiefs, Super Bowl IV champion	
Mekhi Mews	2025	Wide receiver, Montreal Alouettes	
Brandon Middleton	2003	Wide receiver, St. Louis Rams	
Ostell Miles	1991	Running back, Cincinnati Bengals	
Hamin Milligan	2001	Defensive specialist, Dallas Desperados (Arena Football League)	
Hanik Milligan	2001	Defensive back, San Diego Chargers, 2006 Pro Bowl player	
Billy Milner	1994	Lineman, Miami Dolphins/St. Louis Rams	
Leonard Mitchell	1980	Lineman, Philadelphia Eagles/Atlanta Falcons	
Mack Mitchell	1974	Lineman, Cleveland Browns/Cincinnati Bengals	
Alton Montgomery	1989	Defensive back, Denver Broncos/Atlanta Falcons	
Glenn Montgomery	1988	Lineman, Houston Oilers/Seattle Seahawks	
Monty Montgomery	1996	Defensive back, Indianapolis Colts/San Francisco 49ers/Philadelphia Eagles/New Orleans Saints	
Barrick Nealy*	2003	Quarterback, Calgary Stampeders	
Robert Newhouse	1971	Running back, Dallas Cowboys, Super Bowl XI champion	
Riley Odoms	1971	Lineman, Denver Broncos, 1973 Pro Bowl, 1974 Pro Bowl, 1975 Pro Bowl, and 1978 Pro Bowl player	
Alfred Oglesby	1990	Lineman, Miami Dolphins/Green Bay Packers/New York Jets/Cincinnati Bengals	
John O'Korn*	2014	Quarterback; transferred from UH to Michigan	
Ed Oliver*	2018	Lineman, Buffalo Bills	
Fendi Onobun	2010	Tight end, St. Louis Rams/Chicago Bears	
Chad O'Shea	1995	Coaching staffs of Minnesota Vikings, New England Patriots	
Patrick Overmyer*	Current student	Tight end	
Gervarrius Owens	2023	Defensive back, New York Giants	
Derek Parish	2022	Fullback, lineman, Jacksonville Jaguars	
Mike Parker	1998	Linebacker, Tennessee Oilers/Minnesota Vikings	
Patrick Paul	2023	Lineman, Miami Dolphins	
Johnny Peacock	1968	Defensive back, Houston Oilers	
Kenny Perry	1992	College and XFL coach	
Jason Phillips	1988	Wide receiver, Detroit Lions/Atlanta Falcons	
Wade Phillips	1968	Head coach of Dallas Cowboys; previous coaching positions with Houston Oilers, New Orleans Saints, Philadelphia Eagles, Denver Broncos, Buffalo Bills, Atlanta Falcons, San Diego Chargers	
Dickie Post	1966	Running back, San Diego Chargers/Denver Broncos/Houston Oilers	
Joffrey Reynolds	2002	Running back, St. Louis Rams	
Elandon Roberts*	2015	Linebacker, New England Patriots	
Willie Roberts	1969	Defensive back, Chicago Bears	
SirVincent Rogers	2009	Offensive lineman, Toronto Argonauts	
Stanford Routt	2004	Cornerback, Oakland Raiders	
Myles Rowser*	current student	Defensive back	
Kody Russey	2022	Lineman, New England Patriots	
Nick Saenz	2012	Defensive back, Buffalo Bills	
Ra'Shaad Samples	2018	Assistant coach, Los Angeles Rams	
Ethan Sanchez	2025	Placekicker	
Rocky Schwartz	2008	Safety, signed by New Orleans Saints	
Darrell Shepard*	1979	Quarterback, transferred to University of Oklahoma	
Mike Simpson	1968	Defensive back, San Francisco 49ers	
Charles Sims	2012	Running back, Tampa Bay Buccaneers	
Antowain Smith	1996	Running back, Buffalo Bills/New England Patriots/Tennessee Titans/New Orleans Saints/Houston Texans, Super Bowl XXXVI and Super Bowl XXXVIII champion; inventor of the "deke" move	
Donovan Smith	2024	Quarterback	
Lamar Smith	1993	Running back, Seattle Seahawks/Miami Dolphins/New Orleans Saints/Carolina Panthers	
Marcus Spriggs	1996	Lineman, Buffalo Bills/Miami Dolphins/Green Bay Packers	
Marquez Stevenson	2021	Wide receiver, Buffalo Bills	
Phillip Steward	2013	Linebacker, St. Louis Rams	
Rich Stotter	1967	Linebacker, Houston Oilers	
Jim Strong	1969	Running back, San Francisco 49ers/New Orleans Saints	
Grant Stuard	2021	Linebacker, Tampa Bay Buccaneers	
Pat Studstill	1959	Wide receiver, Detroit Lions/Los Angeles Rams/New England Patriots	
Hosea Taylor	1980	Lineman, Baltimore Colts	
Amare Thomas*	Current student	Wide receiver	
Earl Thomas	1970	Wide receiver/tight end, Chicago Bears/St. Louis Cardinals/Houston Oilers	
Randy Thornton	1987	Denver Broncos, Super Bowl XXXII and Super Bowl XXXIII champion	
Nick Thurman	2018	Lineman, New England Patriots	
Matangi Tonga	2010	Football player	
Nadame Tucker*	2024	Defensive lineman; transferred to Western Michigan	
Clayton Tune*	2023	Quarterback	
Payton Turner	2021	Defensive end, New Orleans Saints	
T. J. Turner	1985	Lineman, Miami Dolphins	
Craig Veasey	1989	Lineman, Pittsburgh Steelers/Houston Oilers/Miami Dolphins	
Zelmar Vedder	2026	Defensive back	
Sebastian Vollmer	2009	Lineman, New England Patriots	
Trent Walker*	current student	Wide receiver	
Greg Ward*	2016	Wide receiver, Philadelphia Eagles; was a starting quarterback at UH	
Andre Ware	1989	Quarterback, Oakland Raiders/Detroit Lions/CFL, Recipient of the 1989 Heisman Trophy and Davey O'Brien Award	
Chuck Weatherspoon	1990	Running back, Detroit Lions/Philadelphia Eagles/Tampa Bay Buccaneers	
Conner Weigman*	current student	Quarterback	
Hogan Wharton	1958	Lineman, Houston Oilers	
Wilson Whitley	1976	Lineman, Cincinnati Bengals/Houston Oilers	
Damarion Williams	2021	Defensive back, Baltimore Ravens	
Jarrid Williams*	2020	Lineman, transferred from UH to Miami	
Jermaine Williams	1996	Running back, Jacksonville Jaguars/Oakland Raiders	
Shomari Williams*	2009	Lineman, Saskatchewan Roughriders	
Brandon Wilson	2016	Defensive back, Cincinnati Bengals	
Howard Wilson	2016	Defensive back, Cleveland Browns	
Elmo Wright	1970	Wide receiver, Kansas City Chiefs/New England Patriots/Houston Oilers, inventor of the touchdown victory dance	
George Wright	1969	Lineman, Baltimore Colts	

==== Golf ====
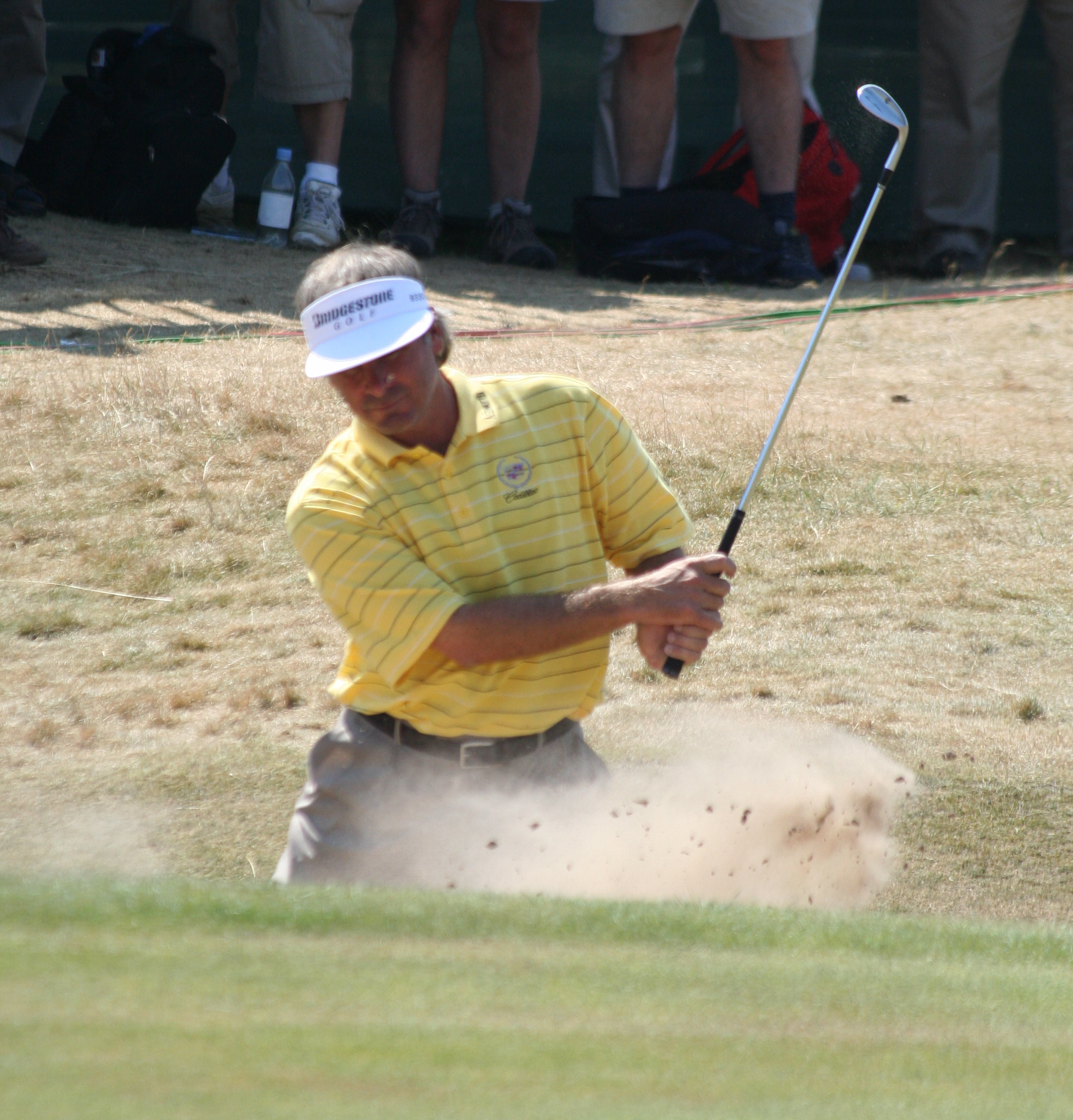
Fred Couples, PGA Tour and Champions Tour golfer

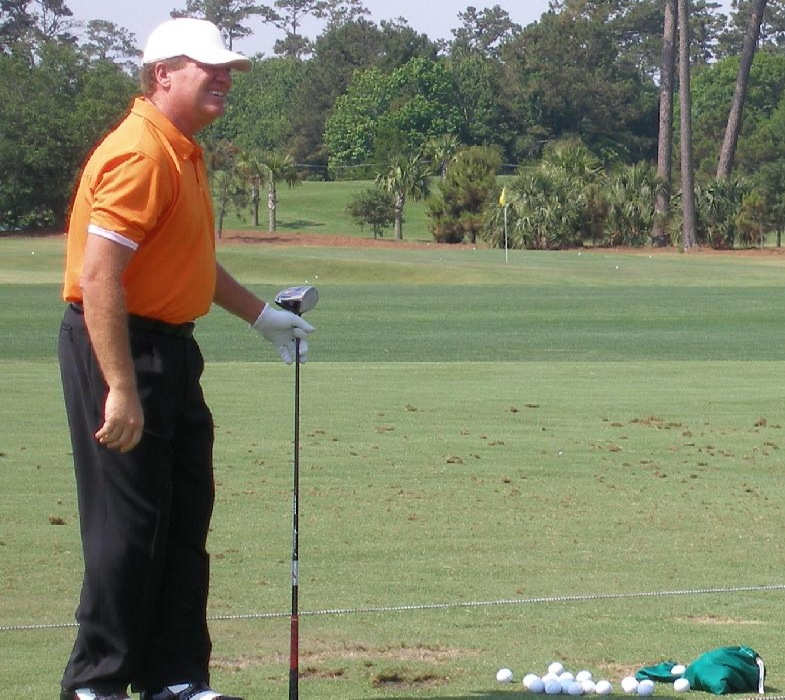
Steve Elkington, PGA Tour golfer

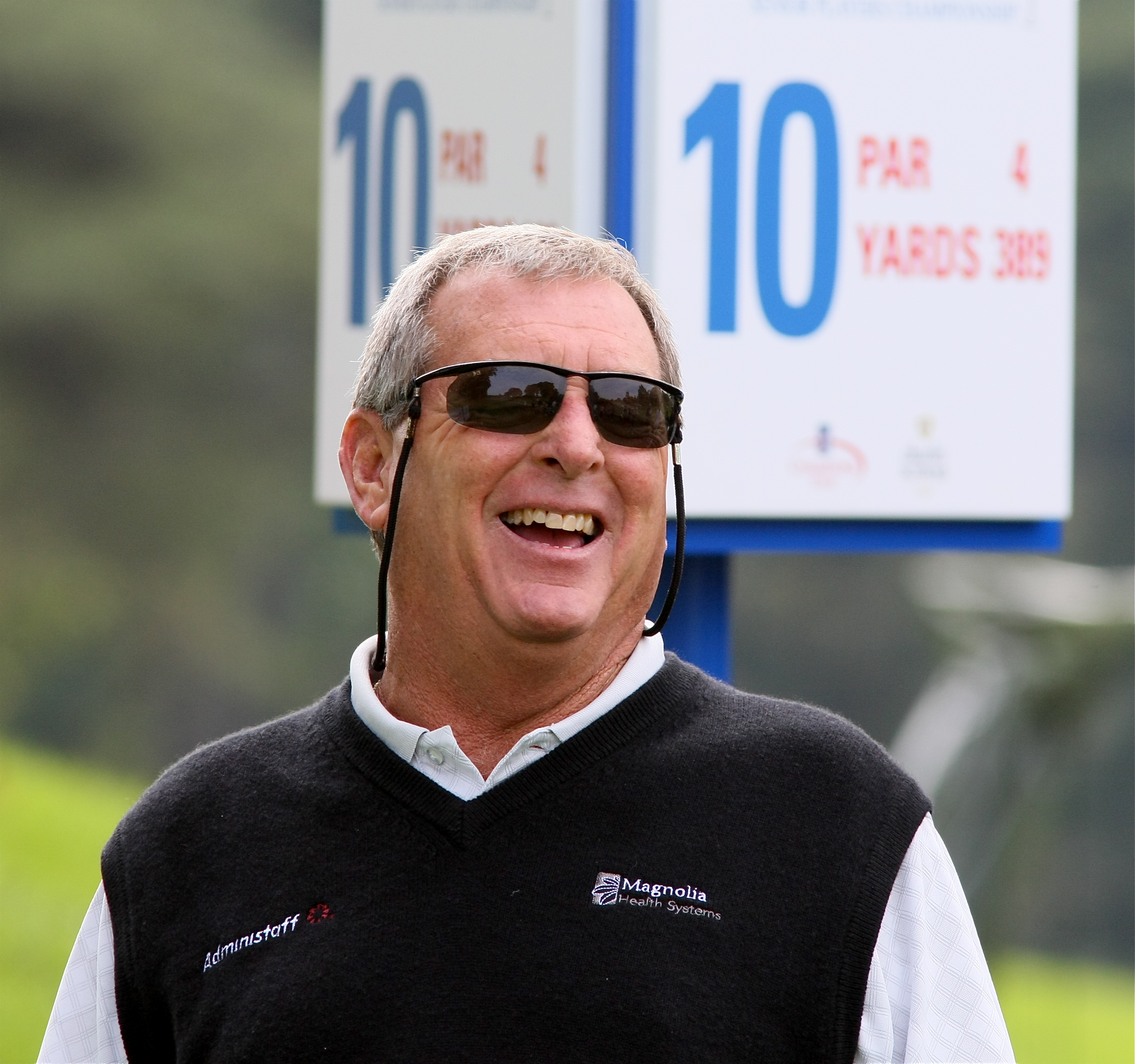
Fuzzy Zoeller, PGA Tour and Champions Tour golfer

Name	Class year	Notability	Reference(s)
Rex Baxter	1957	1 PGA victory	
Larry Beck	1960	PGA Tour professional	
Homero Blancas	1962	4 PGA victories, 1 Senior victory; 1965 PGA Rookie of the Year, US Ryder Cup team; record holder for lowest round in the history of competitive golf	
Billy Ray Brown	1985	3 PGA victories before injuries ended career	
Fred Couples	1980	15 PGA victories including 1 major (1992 Masters); first American to reach No. 1 world rank; World Golf Hall of Fame	
Richard Crawford	1961	2 PGA victories	
Jacky Cupit	1959	4 PGA victories	
Steve Elkington	1985	10 PGA victories including 1 major (1995 PGA Championship)	
Brad Fabel*	1975	PGA Tour professional, 2 Nationwide Tour victories	
Nick Faldo*	1976	9 PGA victories including 6 majors (1987, 1990, and 1992 British Opens; 1989, 1990, and 1996 Masters); 30 European Tour victories; held world #1 ranking for 98 weeks; World Golf Hall of Fame	
Keith Fergus	1976	3 PGA victories, 2 Nationwide Tour victories, 1 Champions Tour victory	
Ed Fiori*	1977	4 PGA victories, 1 Champions Tour victory	
Marty Fleckman	1966	1 PGA victory	
Kirk Hanefeld	1977	PGA, Champions tours	
Anders Hansen	1995	PGA Tour professional, 3 European Tour victories, 2 Sunshine Tour victories	
Leonie Harm	2019	Champion, The Women's Amateur Championship	
Butch Harmon	—	Golf instructor; coached Tiger Woods and many other PGA champions	
Jeff Hawkes	1975	PGA Tour professional, 1 European Tour victory, 1 Southern Africa Tour victory	
Babe Hiskey	1962	2 PGA victories	
David Ishii	1977	1 PGA victory, 14 Japan Golf Tour victories	
Tom Jenkins	1971	1 PGA victory, 7 Champions Tour victories	
Bruce Lietzke	1973	13 PGA victories, 7 Champions Tour victories including Senior Open	
John Mahaffey	1969	10 PGA victories including 1 major (1978 PGA Championship)	
Dave Marr	1952	3 PGA victories including 1 major (1965 PGA Championship); PGA Golfer of the Year for 1965	
Fred Marti	1963	2 PGA victories	
Blaine McCallister	1981	5 PGA victories, 1 Champions Tour victory	
Wade Ormsby*	2001	Asian Tour, European Tour, others	
Phil Rodgers	1958	5 PGA victories	
Bill Rogers	1973	6 PGA victories including 1 major (1981 British Open); 1981 PGA Golfer of the Year	
Jack Rule, Jr.*	1959	2 PGA Tour victories	
Jay Sigel*	—	PGA Champions Tour professional, 8 PGA Champions Tour victories	
Jim Simons*	1969	3 PGA victories	
Mike Standly	1986	1 PGA victory	
Warren Sye	1980	2 Canadian Amateur Championship victories	
Rocky Thompson	1962	PGA Tour professional, 3 Champions Tour victories	
Hal Underwood	1967	2 PGA Tour of Australasia victories, 1 European Tour victory	
Bobby Wadkins*	1970	PGA Tour professional, 1 European Tour victory, 2 Japan Golf Tour victories, 4 Champions Tour victories	
Kermit Zarley	1963	2 PGA victories, 1 Senior PGA victory	
Fuzzy Zoeller*	1973	10 PGA victories including 2 majors (1979 Masters, 1984 U. S. Open), 2 Champions Tour victories including Senior PGA	

==== Gymnastics ====
Name	Class year	Notability	Reference(s)
Shannon Miller	2003	Most decorated American gymnast	
Mo Mitchell	1995	Gymnastics coach, University of Kentucky	

==== Swimming and diving ====
Name	Class year	Notability	Reference(s)
Azul Almazán	—	Diver, Olympic competitor for Mexico	
Ang Peng Siong	1984	Swimming	
Micaela Bouter	2018	Diver, qualified for South Africa Olympic team	
Tania Cagnotto*	2007	Olympic medalist for Italy; first Italian female diver to win a medal in a World Championship	
Doug Campbell	1983	Competed for Scotland in Olympics; set British record for 200m backstroke	
Carin Cone	1962	Olympic medalist, set 7 world records; featured on cover of Sports Illustrated	
Jane Figueiredo	1987	Diver, UH diving coach	
Nicola Fibbens	–	Swimming, Olympic competitor for England	
Hilary Grivich*	1997	Nationally ranked diver at UH; had been an Olympic medalist and US junior all-around champion in gymnastics as a teen	
Debbie Hill	–	Swimmer and diver, Olympic competitor for Great Britain and Zimbabwe	
Vera Ilyina	—	Olympic medalist for Russia	
Anne Jardin	—	Olympic medalist for Canada; set world record in 50m freestyle	
David Lim	—	Swimmer, Olympic competitor for Singapore	
David Lowe	—	Olympic medalist for Great Britain	
Yuliya Pakhalina	2002	Won two silver medals for Russian diving team at 2008 Olympics	
Anastasia Pozdniakova	2009	Won silver medal for Russian diving team at 2008 Olympics	
Teresa Rivera	—	Pan-American Games medalist for Mexico	
Beverley Rose	–	Swimming, Olympic competitor for Great Britain	
Michelle Smith de Bruin	—	Swimming	
Ginni van Katwijk	–	Diver, specializing in high diving/cliff diving	
Antonette Wilken	–	Diver, Olympic competitor for Zimbabwe	

==== Tennis ====
Name	Class year	Notability	Reference(s)
Sarah Borwell	2002	65 in the world for doubles, number 1 GBR doubles player, played every Grand Slam, represented Great Britain 3 times and won a bronze medal at the Commonwealth Games Player for New York Buzz (WTT)	
Ricardo Ycaza	—	World top-ten junior, Davis Cup stalwart, world top-fifty touring professional	

==== Track and field ====
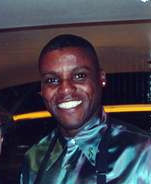
Carl Lewis, track and field legend, 10 Olympic medals (9 gold, 1 bronze)

Name	Class year	Notability	Reference(s)
Jenny Adams	2000	Hurdler	
Seun Adigun	2009	Hurdler, African champion	
Kirk Baptiste	1985	Sprinter	
Brianne Bethel	2020	Sprinter	
Andrea Blackett	2001	Sprinter; coach at Rice University	
Mario Burke	2019	Sprinter, Barbados national champion	
Cameron Burrell	2018	Sprinter	
Dawn Burrell	1996	World champion long jumper	
Leroy Burrell	1990	World record-breaking sprinter, replaced track coach Tom Tellez	
Chris Carter	2011	Triple jumper	
Kym Carter		Heptathlete	
Ollan Cassell	1961	Sprinter, Olympic gold medalist	
Cletus Clark	1985	Hurdler, Pan American Games gold medalist	
Pat Clohessy	1962	Distance runner and coach	
Michelle Collins		Sprinter	
Dennis Darling	—	Sprinter, World Championships medalist for Bahamas	
Joe DeLoach		Sprinter, 1988 Olympic 200 m champion	
Tristan Evelyn	2020	Sprinter	
Stanley Floyd	—	Sprinter, set several world records	
Sandra Glover	1991	Hurdler	
Elijah Hall	2018	Sprinter	
Darrell Hill*	2012	Shot put; transferred from UH to Penn State	
Leonard Hilton	1971	Long-distance runner	
Louie Hinchliffe*	current student	Sprinter, Olympic medalist for Great Britain	
Obi Igbokwe	2019	Sprinter	
Grégoire Illorson		Sprinter	
Jolanda Jones	1989	City of Houston Council member, U.S. heptathlon champion, contestant on Survivor	
Amere Lattin	2019	Hurdler	
Allan Lawrence	1963	Distance runner, Olympic medalist for Australia, set several US records	
Carl Lewis	1985	Track and field legend, 10 Olympic medals (9 gold, 1 bronze) in long jump and sprint events	
Carol Lewis	1989	Record-breaking long jumper; bronze medal, World Championship (1983)	
Shaun Maswanganyi	2024	Sprinter, Olympic medalist for South Africa	
Kahmari Montgomery	2019	Sprinter	
Errol Nolan	2014	Sprinter; gold and bronze medals at World Junior Championships	
Jack Parrington		Sprinter	
Frank Rutherford	1988	Triple jumper, Olympic medalist (first ever Olympic medals for Bahamas); awarded Order of the British Empire	
Lyndon Sands		Triple jumper	
LaMont Smith		Sprinter	
Brian Stanton		High jumper	
Cecilia Tamayo-Garza	2022	Sprinter	
Nuuausala Tuilefano	—	Shotputter	

==== Volleyball ====
Name	Class year	Notability	Reference(s)
Lucille Charuk	2012	Canadian National Volleyball Team	
Rita Crockett*	1977	Volleyball	
Flo Hyman*	1977	Volleyball	
Rose Magers	1981	Volleyball	
Sophie Paine	2016	Australian National Volleyball Team	

=== Business ===
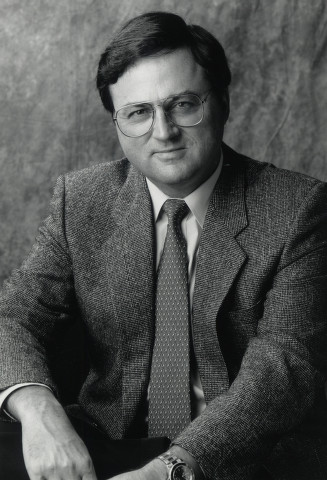
John Moores, Co-founder of BMC Software, co-owner of San Diego Padres

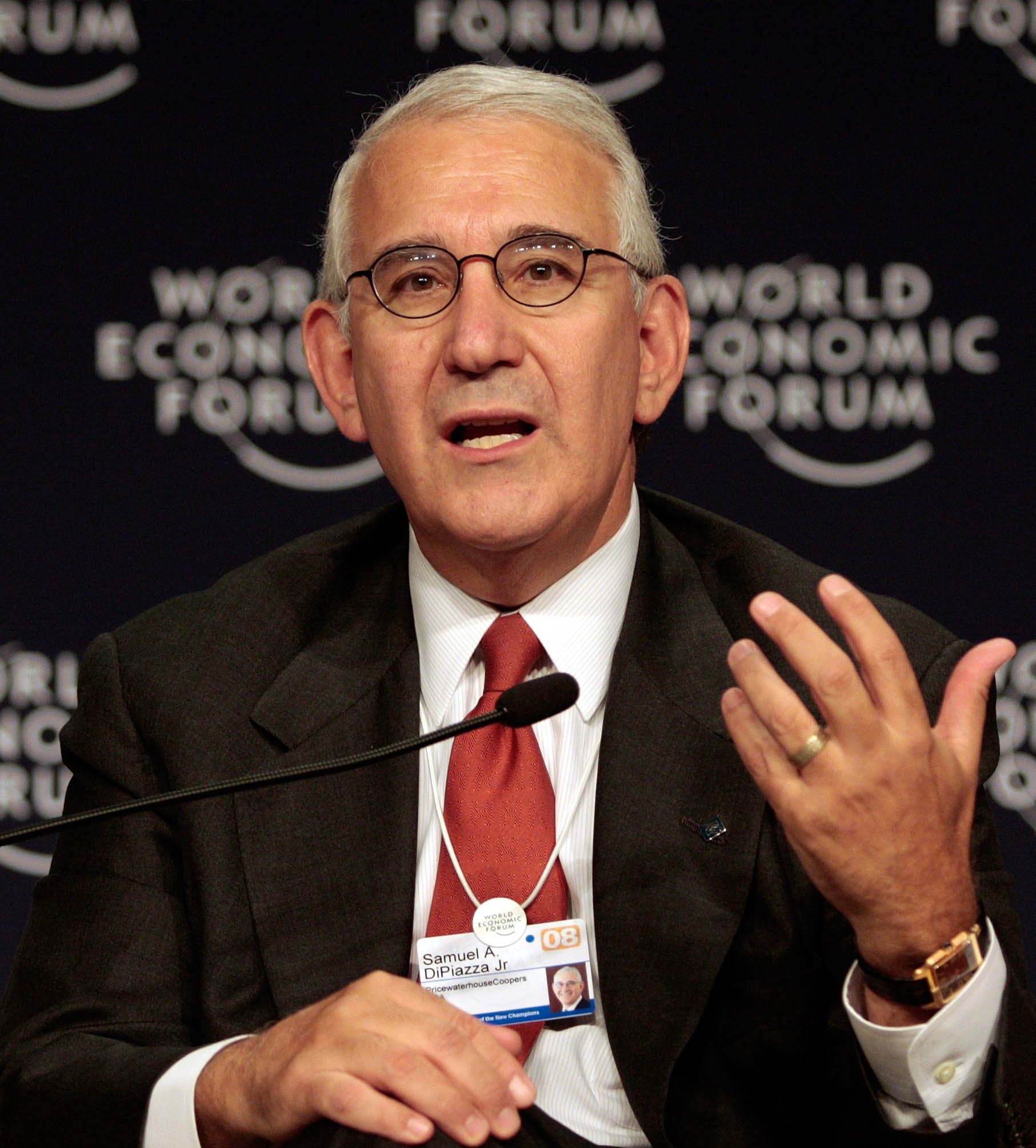
Samuel DiPiazza, CEO of PricewaterhouseCoopers

Name	Class year	Notability	Reference(s)
Mary Kay Ash*	1943	Founder, Mary Kay Cosmetics	
Bruce D. Broussard	1989	CEO and president, Humana	
Rod Canion	1966	Co-founder, Compaq	
Samuel DiPiazza	1973	Chairman and Global CEO, PricewaterhouseCoopers	
Tilman J. Fertitta		President and CEO, Landry's Restaurants	
Milane Frantz	1998	Investor, billionaire	
Alan Gershenhorn	1982	Executive vice president and chief commercial officer, United Parcel Service	
Karen Katz	1982	President and CEO, Neiman Marcus	
Kenneth Lay	1970	Former CEO, Enron	
Aylwin Lewis	1990	President and CEO, Kmart, Sears	
James E. Lyon		Houston developer and Republican political activist	
Tracy Malechek-Ezekiel		Chef and restaurateur	
Mike McShaffry	1990	Video-game programmer, entrepreneur, author; founder, Tornado Alley	
Jack B. Moore	1977	President and CEO, Cameron	
John Moores	1970	Founder, Peregrine Systems; co-founder, BMC Software; owner, San Diego Padres; major contributor to University of Houston and San Diego State University	
Matt Mullenweg*	2004	Founding developer of WordPress; founder of Automattic	
Dominic Ng	1980	Chairman and CEO, East West Bancorp, Inc.	
Marvin Odum	1995	President, Shell Oil Company; CEO, Intergen	
Dan Rapoport	1991	President of Rapoport Capital, financier and philanthropist	
Kristy Scott	2016	Social media personality and content creator	
John Stubblefield	1970	Former CFO, Sysco Corporation	
Averie Swanson		Brewmaster	
Ramiz Tafilaj		Oil business executive; activist who has helped liberate Kosovo and Albania	
Henry Taub*		Founder, Automatic Data Processing	
Kenneth Thomas	1972	CFO, United States Chess Federation	
David A. Williams	1992	President and CEO, Make-A-Wish Foundation	
Randa Williams	1988	Businesswoman, billionaire	
Bruce Williamson	1995	Chairman, CEO, and president, Dynegy	
Welcome W. Wilson, Sr.	1949	Chairman of GSL Welcome Group, chairman of University of Houston System Board of Regents	

=== Government, politics, and law ===
==== Government ====
Name	Class year	Notability	Reference(s)
Carol E. Dinkins	1971	Former U.S. deputy attorney general	
Michael P. Jackson	1977	Former United States Deputy Secretary of Homeland Security and former United States Deputy Secretary of Transportation	
Kamal Kharazi	1976	Former Iranian Minister of Foreign Affairs; former Iranian Ambassador to the United Nations	
Brian D. Montgomery	1986	Assistant Secretary for Housing and former Deputy Assistant to the President and Cabinet Secretary	
Jon Rosenthal	2016	Railroad Commissioner-elect of Texas	
Peter Roussel	1965	Former White House Deputy Press Secretary	
Philip D. Zelikow	1977	Executive director of 9/11 Commission	

==== Politics ====
Name	Class year	Notability	Reference(s)
Alma A. Allen	1992	Texas state representative	
Thad Altman	1976 & 1977	Current Florida state representative; former Florida state senator; former Brevard County commissioner	
Carol Alvarado	1992 & 2008	Texas state representative	
Ray Barnhart	1993 (M.A. in speech and theatre)	State representative from Pasadena 1973–75, Republican Party state chairman 1977–79, and director of the Federal Highway Administration 1981–87	
Michael Berry	1993	Former Houston city councilman and current talk show host	
Elton Bomer		Texas state representative from Anderson County and former Texas Secretary of State	
Peter Hoyt Brown	1958	Houston city councilman, 2009 Houston Mayoral Candidate	
Briscoe Cain		Texas state representative for District 128, beginning 2017; lawyer in Deer Park; received B.S. in Communications	
Bill Callegari	1972	Texas state representative, 2001–2015; engineer and businessman	
Robert R. Casey	1934	Former Texas state representative; former U.S. congressman	
David Cobb	1987	2004 presidential candidate of the Green Party	
Jasmine Crockett	2006	U.S. congresswoman, former Texas state representative	
Henry Cuellar*		United States and Texas state representative	
John E. Davis		Republican member of the Texas House of Representatives from District 129 in Houston since 1999	
Tom DeLay	1970	Former U.S. congressman; former deputy minority whip; former House majority whip; former House majority leader	
Eni Faleomavaega	1972	U.S. congressman, delegate to the U.S. House of Representatives from American Samoa; former lieutenant governor of American Samoa; former attorney general of American Samoa	
Jessica Farrar	1995	Texas state representative	
Gene Green	1971	U.S. congressman	
Henry Grover	1962	Texas Republican politician, gubernatorial nominee in 1972	
David Heitmeier	1987	Member of the Louisiana State Senate for New Orleans; optometrist	
Al Hoang	1989		
Fred Hofheinz	1964	Houston mayor, son of Roy Hofheinz	
Roy Hofheinz	1931	Houston mayor, Harris County judge, Texas state representative; also entrepreneur who led efforts to create Houston Colt .45s, Astrodome, Astroturf	
Dean A. Hrbacek	1986	Former mayor of Sugar Land, Texas	
Lacey Hull		Texas state representative	
Julie Johnson	1991	U.S. Representative, attorney	
Daylin Leach	1986	Pennsylvania state representative	
Melissa Noriega	1977	Houston city councilperson	
Rick Noriega	1984	Former Texas state representative	
Colion Noir	2005	National Rifle Association spokesperson	
Dora Olivo	1975	Texas state representative	
Larry Phillips	1990	Texas state representative, state judge	
Ted Poe	1973	U.S. congressman	
Howard Wallace Pollock	1955	Former U.S. congressman	
Barbara Ann Radnofsky	1976	U.S. Senate nominee, Texas attorney general candidate	
Richard T. Schulze*	1949	Former U.S. congressman	
Steve Stockman	1990	U.S. representative from Texas, 1995–97, 2013-; candidate for U.S. Senate in 2014 Republican primary	
Azam Khan Swati	–	Member, Pakistani Senate	
Robert Talton	1971	Member of the Texas House of Representatives 1993–2009; candidate for chief justice of the Texas Supreme Court in 2014 Republican primary election	
Senfronia Thompson	1996	Texas state representative	
Sylvester Turner	1977	Texas state representative, mayor of Houston, United States House of Representatives	
Leticia R. Van de Putte*		Texas state senator	
Richard Viguerie	1958	Conservative activist, writer	
Hubert Vo	1983	Texas state representative; first and only Vietnamese American to be elected to the Texas Legislature	
Armando Walle	2004	Texas state representative	
Elizabeth Warren	1970	United States senator from Massachusetts; special advisor of U.S. Consumer Financial Protection Bureau; chair of Congressional Oversight Panel; Harvard law professor; bankruptcy expert; one of Time magazine's 100 Most Influential People in the World	
Royce West	1979	Texas state senator	
James E. White	M.S. 2010 and Ph.D. 2012	Member of the Texas House of Representatives from District 19 in Tyler County; educator and rancher	
John Whitmire	1975	Texas state senator, dean of the Texas Senate	
Kathryn J. Whitmire	1977	Former City of Houston mayor	
Martha Wong	1976	Former Texas state representative	
Beverly Woolley	1993	Texas state representative	
Joseph P. Wyatt, Jr.*	1970	U.S. congressman	
Judith Zaffirini		Texas state senator	

==== Law and law enforcement ====
Name	Class year	Notability	Reference(s)
Fortunato Benavides	1968	U. S. federal judge	
Alfred H. Bennett	1988	U. S. district judge	
Tony Buzbee	1997	Trial lawyer	
Anne Clutterbuck	1987	Attorney	
Cathy Cochran	1984	State appeals judge	
Marcia A. Crone	1978	U. S. district judge	
Larry Joe Doherty	1970	Judge for TV show Texas Justice, 2008 Congressional candidate	
William F. Downes	1974	U. S. district judge	
Phyllis Frye	1981	First openly transgender judge appointed in the United States	
Vanessa Gilmore	1981	US Federal judge (youngest in the nation at the time of her appointment)	
Richard "Racehorse" Haynes	1956	Criminal Defense attorney	
Randy Hendricks	1968	Sports attorney and agent	
Patricia R. "Pat" Lykos	1967	Harris County District Attorney	
I. D. McMaster	1950	US district judge	
Gray H. Miller	1974	US federal judge	
David Newell	1993	Judge of the Texas Court of Criminal Appeals, Place 9	
John O'Quinn	1965	Highest paid attorney in Texas	
Larry Phillips	1990	Texas state judge, state representative	
Michael H. Schneider Sr.	1971	federal judge	
Ruby Kless Sondock	1959	First female Texas Supreme Court justice	
Mini Timmaraju	1999	Attorney, reproductive rights advocate	
Olen Underwood	1970	State judge, NFL football player	
Juan F. Vasquez	1977	Attorney, U.S. Tax Court judge	
Richard Waites	1982	Attorney, social psychologist	
Brent Webster	2005	Texas Attorney General	
Samuel F. Wright	1976	Attorney	

=== Religion ===
Name	Class year	Notability	Reference(s)
Shaker Elsayed		Muslim Imam of the Dar Al-Hijrah mosque in Falls Church, Virginia	
René Henry Gracida	1950	Former Catholic bishop	
Jason Grote	2007	Reformed Episcopal Church bishop	
Hal Lindsey*		Christian evangelist and writer	
Victoria Osteen*		Co-pastor of Lakewood Church, the largest church in the nation; spouse of Joel Osteen	
Abu Ammaar Yasir Qadhi		Muslim scholar, writer, educator	
Hyman Judah Schachtel	1948	Longtime Houston rabbi and deliverer of Lyndon B. Johnson's inaugural prayer	
Priscilla Shirer		Christian speaker, author	
Thomas B. Warren		Church of Christ minister and Restorationist Philosopher and Theologian	
Kenneth W. Wright		Church of Christ minister	

=== Science and technology ===
==== Astronauts ====
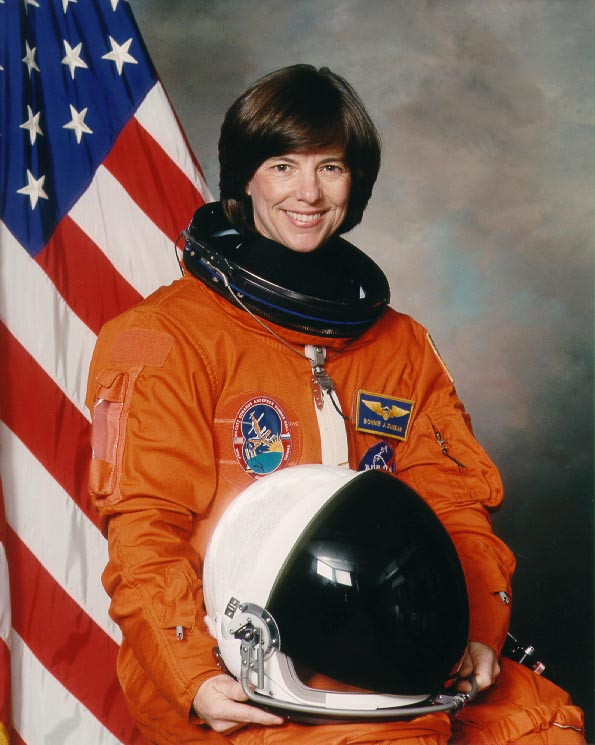
Bonnie J. Dunbar, former NASA astronaut

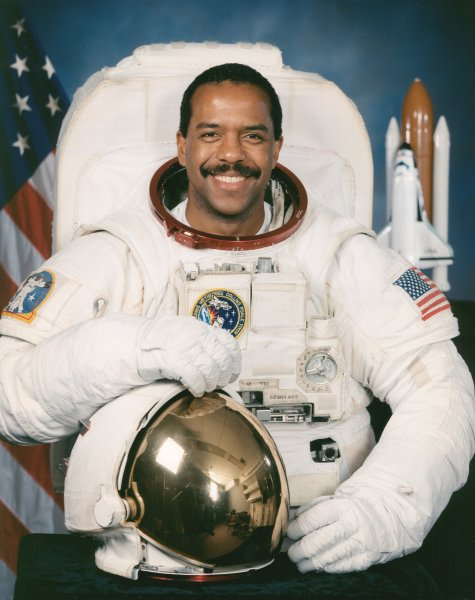
Bernard A. Harris, Jr., former NASA astronaut

Name	Class year	Notability	Reference(s)
Maurizio Cheli	1994	ESA astronaut	
Nancy J. Currie-Gregg	1997	NASA astronaut	
Bonnie J. Dunbar	1983	Former NASA astronaut; president of the Museum of Flight; member of National Academy of Engineering	
William Frederick Fisher	1980	Former NASA astronaut; longest space walk in history	
Bernard A. Harris, Jr.	1978	Former NASA astronaut; first African-American to walk in space	
Donald Holmquest	1988	NASA astronaut	
Akihiko Hoshide	1997	JAXA astronaut	
John D. Olivas	1993	NASA astronaut	
Rex J. Walheim	1989	NASA astronaut	

==== Other scientists and engineers ====
Name	Class year	Notability	Reference(s)
Abdeldjelil Belarbi	1986	Chair, Department of Civil and Environmental Engineering at the University of Houston	
Brigitte Boisselier		Raëlian bishop and CEO of Clonaid	
Savas Dimopoulos		Particle physicist	
Eddy Goldfarb*	1942	Invented chattering teeth and hundreds of other toys	
Duy-Loan Le	1989	Engineer	
Emily Leproust	2001	Bioscientist, entrepreneur, CEO and co-founder of Twist Bioscience	
Keqin Li	1990	Computer scientist, SUNY Distinguished Professor, IEEE Fellow	
David W. Murhammer	1989	Department chair of Chemical and Biochemical Engineering at the University of Iowa	
Frances Northcutt	1984	NASA engineer, attorney	
Dennis Paul		Engineer; Republican member of the Texas House of Representatives from Harris County; earlier worked to clean up Armand Bayou	

=== Other ===
Name	Class year	Notability	Reference(s)
Justin Whitlock Dart, Jr.	1953	Activist, father of Americans with Disabilities Act of 1990	
Lynn Eusan	1970	First black Homecoming queen at UH	
Antonio Molina		Member of first same-sex married couple in Texas; played football for UH Cougars	
Olga Rodriguez	1970	Chicano activist	
Charles Rogers		Implicated in John F. Kennedy assassination	
Jon Schillaci		Former fugitive on the FBI Ten Most Wanted Fugitives	
Aafia Siddiqui*	1991	Neuroscientist (alleged Al-Qaeda operative), convicted of assaulting with a deadly weapon and attempting to kill U.S. soldiers and FBI agents	
Andrea Yates*	1984	Drowned her five children; highly publicized legal case ensued	

== Honorary degrees ==
Individuals who have received honorary degrees from the University of Houston include Edward Albee, Donald Barthelme, Irvin Borish, George H. W. Bush, Rafael Ángel Calderón Fournier, Ernesto Cortes, Hugh Roy Cullen, Jan de Hartog, Loretta Devine, Christoph Eschenbach, Cristina Rivera Garza, David Gockley, Glenn Goerke, Barron Hilton, Eric Hilton, Gerald D. Hines, Oveta Culp Hobby, William P. Hobby Jr., Philip Guthrie Hoffman, Brien Holden, Philip Johnson, Edith Irby Jones, Bob Lanier, Jacques-Louis Lions, Lyle Lovett, Jim McIngvale, Carlos Menem, George P. Mitchell, François Mitterrand, John Moores, Robert Mosbacher, Jim Nantz, Edison E. Oberholtzer, Rod Paige, Arnold Schwarzenegger, Ruth Simmons, Dinesh Singh, Song Jian, Margaret Spellings, Ron Stone, Herman D. Suit, Jack Valenti, Catalina Vasquez Villalpando, Welcome W. Wilson Sr., and Daniel Yergin.
(Bold names indicate UH alumni.)

== Faculty and staff ==
=== Administration ===
Name	Department	Years	Notability	Reference
Marguerite Ross Barnett	Administration	1990–1992	President of University of Houston	
A. D. Bruce	Administration	1954–1956	President of University of Houston	
Diane Zaino Chase	Administration	2023–present	Provost, senior vice president for academic affairs	
Hugh Roy Cullen	Administration	1937–1957	Chairman of Board of Regents	
James A. Elkins	Administration	—	Board of Regents	
Glenn Goerke	Administration	1995–1997	President of University of Houston	
Jay Gogue	Administration	2003–2007	President of University of Houston, chancellor of University of Houston System	
Philip Guthrie Hoffman	Administration	1961–1977	President of University of Houston, chancellor of University of Houston System	
Renu Khator	Administration	2008–	President of University of Houston, chancellor of University of Houston System	
Barry Munitz	Administration	1977–1982	President of University of Houston	
Edison E. Oberholtzer	Administration	1927–1950	Founder and first president of University of Houston	
Michael Pelletier	Institute for Global Engagement	2021–present	Executive director, IGE	
Richard L. Van Horn	Administration	1983–1989	President of University of Houston	
Welcome W. Wilson, Sr.	Administration	2006–	Chairman of Board of Regents	

=== Athletics ===
Name	Department	Notability	Reference
John Altobelli	Athletics	Assistant baseball coach 1987	
Frank Anderson	Athletics	Assistant baseball coach 2013–2017	
Major Applewhite	Athletics	Assistant football coach 2015–2016; head football coach 2016–2018	
Dave Aranda	Athletics	Assistant football coach 2003–2004	
Joe Arenas	Athletics	Assistant football coach 1963–1986	
Austin Armstrong	Athletics	Assistant football coach 2025–present	
Kevin Barbay	Athletics	Assistant football coach 2024	
Clancy Barone	Athletics	Assistant football coach 2000–2002	
Doug Belk	Athletics	Assistant football coach 2019–2023	
Shawn Bell	Athletics	Assistant football coach 2024–present	
John R. Bender	Athletics	PE instructor 1927–1928, coined "Cougars" nickname	
Michael Bishop	Athletics	Assistant football coach 2025–present	
Marquel Blackwell	Athletics	Assistant football coach 2019–2021	
Tom Boisture	Athletics	Assistant football coach 1962–1965	
Art Briles	Athletics	Head football coach 2003–2007	
Kendal Briles	Athletics	Assistant football coach 2018	
Alvin Brooks	Athletics	Head basketball coach 1993–1998, assistant basketball coach 2010–2021	
Melvin Brown	Athletics	Assistant football coach 1962–1977	
Jamie Bryant	Athletics	Assistant football coach 2011–2012	
Todd Buchanan	Athletics	Head women's basketball coach 2010–2013	
Dick Bumpas	Athletics	Assistant football coach 1999–2002	
Leroy Burrell	Athletics	Head track coach 1998–2022	
Leon Burtnett	Athletics	Assistant football coach 2008–2011	
Travis Bush	Athletics	Assistant football coach 2012–2014	
Neil Callaway	Athletics	Assistant football coach 1993–1997	
Bill Carr	Athletics	Athletic director 1993–1997	
Tyron Carrier	Athletics	Assistant football coach 2019–2020	
James Casey	Athletics	Assistant football coach 2016–2018	
Kerron Clement	Athletics	Assistant track coach	
Red Conkright	Athletics	Assistant football coach 1957–1958	
Kevin Cook	Athletics	Assistant women's basketball coach 1995–1997	
Harden Cooper	Athletics	Assistant football coach 1950–1954	
Larry Coyer	Athletics	Assistant football coach 1990	
Jack Cressend	Athletics	Assistant baseball coach 2010–2012	
Joe Curl	Athletics	Head women's basketball coach 1998–2010; National Coach of the Year 2003–2004	
Rudy Davalos	Athletics	Athletic director 1987–1992	
Will Davis	Athletics	Head baseball coach 2026–present	
Shannon Dawson	Athletics	Assistant football coach 2019–2022	
Cedric Dempsey	Athletics	Athletic director 1979–1982	
James Dickey	Athletics	Head basketball coach 2010–2014	
Jim Dickey	Athletics	Assistant football coach 1964–1965	
Dana Dimel	Athletics	Head football coach 2000–2002	
Mark D'Onofrio	Athletics	Assistant football coach 2017–2018	
Clyde Drexler	Athletics	Head basketball coach 1998–2000	
Jim Eddy	Athletics	Assistant football coach 1986–1989	
Zac Etheridge	Athletics	Assistant football coach 2019–2020, 2024	
Chuck Fairbanks	Athletics	Assistant football coach 1962–1965	
Keith Fergus	Athletics	Golf coach 1988–1994	
Debbie Ferguson-McKenzie	Athletics	Assistant track coach 2014–2018	
Jane Figueiredo	Athletics	Assistant diving coach 1988–1990, head diving coach 1990–2014	
Pat Foster	Athletics	Head basketball coach 1986–1993	
Harry Fouke	Athletics	Athletic director 1946–1979	
Willie Fritz	Athletics	Head football coach 2023–present	
Reid Gettys	Athletics	Assistant basketball coach 1998	
David Gibbs	Athletics	Assistant football coach 2013–2014; interim head football coach 2014	
Sterlin Gilbert	Athletics	Assistant football coach 2005	
Chet Gladchuk Jr.	Athletics	Athletic director 1997–2001	
Anthony Goldwire	Athletics	Basketball staff 2021–present	
Kenny Guiton	Athletics	Assistant football coach 2017–2018	
Brick Haley	Athletics	Assistant football coach 1997	
Phill Hansell	Athletics	Swimming and diving coach, 1957–1996	
Floyd Heard	Athletics	Assistant track coach 2012–2017	
Clay Helton	Athletics	Assistant football coach 1997–1999	
Kim Helton	Athletics	Head football coach 1993–1999	
Tom Herman	Athletics	Head football coach 2015–2016	
Lovette Hill	Athletics	Head baseball coach 1950–1974, assistant football coach 1949–1961	
Dana Holgorsen	Athletics	Assistant football coach 2008–2009; head football coach 2019–2023	
Ronald Hughey	Athletics	Head women's basketball coach 2014–2025	
Joel Hunt	Athletics	Assistant football coach 1955	
Ben Hurt	Athletics	Assistant football coach 1965–1971	
Jim Jeffcoat	Athletics	Assistant football coach 2008–2010	
John Jenkins	Athletics	Head football coach 1990–1992	
Mike Jinks	Athletics	Assistant football coach 2022–2023	
Brian Johnson	Athletics	Assistant football coach 2017	
Scott Kellar	Athletics	Assistant football coach 2001–2004	
Malcolm Kelly	Athletics	Assistant football coach 2017–2018	
Jessie Kenlaw	Athletics	Assistant women's basketball coach 1988–1990, head women's basketball coach 1990–1998	
Kliff Kingsbury	Athletics	Football staff 2008–2011	
Les Koenning, Jr.	Athletics	Assistant football coach 1999	
Hal Lahar	Athletics	Head football coach 1957–1961	
Clyde Lee	Athletics	Head football coach 1948–1954	
Tony Levine	Athletics	Assistant football coach 2008–2011; head football coach 2011–2014	
Carl Lewis	Athletics	Assistant track coach 2014–2022; head track coach 2023–present	
Carol Lewis	Athletics	Assistant track coach 2026–present	
Guy Lewis	Athletics	Head basketball coach 1956–1986: 592 wins; 27 consecutive seasons without a losing record; five Final Four appearances, including two NCAA finals; National Collegiate Basketball Hall of Fame 2007; Naismith Memorial Basketball Hall of Fame 2013	
John Lott	Athletics	Assistant football coach 1991–1996	
Dave Maggard	Athletics	Athletic director 2002–2009	
Mickey Matthews	Athletics	Assistant football coach 1986	
Matt Mattox	Athletics	Assistant football coach 2005–2006	
Ray McCallum	Athletics	Head basketball coach 2000–2004	
Marcus McGraw	Athletics	Assistant football coach 2014–2016	
Bill Meek	Athletics	Head football coach 1955–1956	
Brandon Middleton	Athletics	Assistant football coach 2012–2013	
Matthew Mitchell	Athletics	Head women's basketball coach 2025–present	
Philip Montgomery	Athletics	Assistant football coach 2003–2005	
Eric Morris	Athletics	Assistant football coach 2010–2011	
Eman Naghavi	Athletics	Assistant football coach 2023–present	
Slade Nagle	Athletics	Assistant football coach 2025–present	
Ruth Nelson	Athletics	Head women's volleyball coach 1974–1980	
Mike Nesbitt	Athletics	Assistant football coach 2012	
Rayner Noble	Athletics	Head baseball coach 1994–2010	
Todd Orlando	Athletics	Assistant football coach 2015–2016; interim head football coach 2016	
Chad O'Shea	Athletics	Assistant football coach 1996–1999	
Yulia Pakhalina	Athletics	Diving coach 2014–2015	
Jack Pardee	Athletics	Head football coach 1987–1989	
Alden Pasche	Athletics	Head basketball coach 1946–1956	
Tom Penders	Athletics	Head basketball coach 2004–2010	
Bradley Dale Peveto	Athletics	Assistant football coach 1999–2002	
Dan Pfaff	Athletics	Assistant track coach 1980–1981	
Bum Phillips	Athletics	Assistant football coach 1965–1966	
Jason Phillips	Athletics	Assistant football coach 2010–2011	
Wade Phillips	Athletics	Assistant football coach 1969	
Hollis Price	Athletics	Assistant basketball coach 2014–present	
Mack Rhoades	Athletics	Athletic director 2009–2015	
Melvin Robertson	Athletics	Assistant football coach 1965–1971, 1991–1993	
Terry Rooney	Athletics	Assistant baseball coach 2017–2021	
Doc Sadler	Athletics	Assistant basketball coach 1986	
Kellen Sampson	Athletics	Assistant basketball coach 2014–present	
Kelvin Sampson	Athletics	Head basketball coach 2014–present	
Chris Scelfo	Athletics	Assistant football coach 2017	
John Skladany	Athletics	Assistant football coach 2008–2009	
DeNesha Stallworth	Athletics	Assistant women's basketball coach 2025–present	
Brian Stewart	Athletics	Assistant football coach 2010–2011	
Kevin Sumlin	Athletics	Head football coach 2008–2011	
Tom Tellez	Athletics	Head track coach 1976–1998, volunteer assistant track coach 1998–present; legendary coach of numerous world champions and Olympic gold medalists, head coach of U.S. national team for World Championships and Pan American Games, namesake of UH's Tom Tellez Track at Carl Lewis International Complex	
Pat Thomas	Athletics	Assistant football coach 1985–1989	
Ned Thompson	Athletics	Head baseball coach 1947, assistant football coach 1946–1948, associate athletic director 1946–1976	
Chris Thurmond	Athletics	Interim head football coach 2007	
Don Todd	Athletics	Assistant football coach 1972–1985	
Marcus Tubbs	Athletics	Assistant athletics director 2016–2019	
Kristin Vesely	Athletics	Assistant softball coach 2011–2016; head softball coach 2017–2025	
Jewell Wallace	Athletics	Head football coach 1946–1947	
Rolan Walton	Athletics	Head baseball coach 1975–1986	
Alan Weddell	Athletics	Assistant football coach 2005–2007	
Quannas White	Athletics	Assistant basketball coach 2017–2025	
Todd Whitting	Athletics	Head baseball coach 2010–2026	
Dave Williams	Athletics	Head golf coach 1952–1987; won 16 national championships	
Greg Williams	Athletics	Head women's basketball coach 1985–1990	
Gregg Williams	Athletics	Assistant football coach 1988–1989	
Woody Williams	Athletics	Assistant baseball coach 2024–2025	
Ryan Wochomurka	Athletics	Head swimming and diving coach 2015–2021	
Shiel Wood	Athletics	Assistant football coach 2024	
Bill Yeoman	Athletics	Head football coach 1962–1986	
Steve Yoder	Athletics	Assistant basketball coach 2014–2017	

=== Government, politics, and law ===
Name	Department	Notability	Reference
Cathy Cochran	Law	Judge, professor, editor	
Frances Farenthold	Law	Educator, lawyer, politician, college administrator, activist	
Alberto Gonzales	Law	80th United States attorney general	
Elwyn Lee	Law	Vice president for Student Affairs, UH; vice chancellor, UH System	
Raymond Nimmer	Law	Dean of UH Law School	
Alan Stone	Political science	Professor, writer	
Elizabeth Warren	Law	U.S. Senator, consumer advocate, professor	
Kirk Watson	Public Affairs	Dean, UH Hobby School of Public Affairs	

=== Liberal arts ===
Name	Department	Notability	Reference
Alfred Arteaga	English	Poet, writer, scholar	
Donald Barthelme	English	Author and co-founder of Creative Writing School	
J. Don Boney	Psychology, Education	Educator	
Robert Boswell	English	Short-story writer, novelist	
Brené Brown	Social work	Scholar, author, public speaker	
Rosellen Brown	English	Author	
Elizabeth Brown-Guillory	English	Playwright, performer, academic	
Alessandro Carrera	Italian studies	Poet, translator; director of Italian Studies at UH	
Arlen F. Chase	Comparative Cultural Studies	Archeologist, explorer	
Carol L. Dennis	English	Author, editor, teacher	
Chitra Banerjee Divakaruni	English	Author, poet, and professor of English	
Mark Doty	English	Poet, memoirist	
Nick Flynn	English	Writer, poet	
Sandra Gin	Communication	Television journalist, Emmy Award-winning producer of Cristina's Court	
William Goyen	English	Author	
Elena Grigorenko	Psychology	Clinical psychologist, geneticist	
Edward Hirsch	English	Poet	
Tony Hoagland	English	Poet, winner of 2008 Jackson Prize	
Alan Hollinghurst	English	Novelist	
Frank Holt	History	Authority on Ancient Greece and Rome; numismatist	
Gerald Horne	History	Historian	
Richard Howard	English	Poet, critic, essayist	
Chinhui Juhn	Economics	Labor economist	
Mat Johnson	English	Fiction writer	
Nicolás Kanellos	Hispanic Studies	Founder and director of Arte Público Press	
Justin Leiber	Philosophy	Philosopher, science fiction writer	
Philip Levine	English	Poet	
Joe Leydon	Communication	Film critic and author, adjunct professor of Journalism	
Paul Lisicky	English	Novelist, memoirist	
Phillip Lopate	English	Film critic, essayist, fiction writer, poet, teacher	
Rubén Martínez	English	Journalist, author, musician	
William Matthews	English	Poet, essayist	
Martin V. Melosi	History	Environmental historian	
David Mikics	English	Author, professor	
Steven Mintz	History	Author, professor	
Ange Mlinko	English	Poet; Guggenheim Fellow	
Antonya Nelson	English	Author	
Lynn Okagaki	Education	Head, National Center for Education Research	
Robert Phillips	English	Poet	
Kevin Prufer	English	Poet, essayist	
Pamela Anne Quiroz	Sociology	Director, UH Center for Mexican American Studies, Hispanic Association of Colleges and Universities Fellow	
Claudia Rankine	English	Poet	
Cristina Rivera Garza	Hispanic Studies, Creative Writing	Author, won 2024 Pulitzer Prize	
Mary Robison	English	Short-story writer, novelist	
Allie Rowbottom	English	Writer	
Alexander F. Schilt	Education	Education professor; former chancellor of UH System and president or chancellor of several other colleges and universities	
Dale Schunk	Education	Educational psychologist	
Daniel Stern	English	Novelist	
Mark Strand	English	Poet, essayist	
Mercedes Valdivieso	English	Novelist, journalist	
Jody Williams	Social work	Nobel laureate, professor of Social Work and Global Justice	
Meg Wolitzer	English	Writer	
Charles Wright	English	Poet	

=== Performing arts ===
Name	Department	Notability	Reference
Edward Albee	Theatre	Playwright; Kennedy Center honoree, three Pulitzer Prizes, Tony Award	
Steven Ansell	Music	Violist; principal, Boston Symphony Orchestra	
James Austin	Music	Trumpet player; principal, Houston Symphony	
Daniel Belcher	Music	Opera singer	
Emanuel Borok	Music	Violinist; concertmaster, Dallas Symphony Orchestra	
Igor Buketoff	Music	Conductor	
Tony Campise	Music	Jazz saxophonist; director of UH Jazz Ensemble	
Lois Chiles	Theatre	Actress	
Katherine Ciesinski	Music	Opera singer	
Wayne Crouse	Music	Violist; principal, Houston Symphony	
Lisa D'Amour	Theatre	Playwright	
Joseph Evans	Music	Opera singer	
Carlisle Floyd	Music	Opera composer; American Academy of Arts and Letters, National Medal of Arts (U.S.)	
Leonid Grin	Music	Conductor	
Horacio Gutiérrez	Music	Concert pianist	
Sidney Harth	Music	Violinist, conductor; concertmaster, New York Philharmonic, Chicago Symphony Orchestra, and Los Angeles Philharmonic	
Michael Horvit	Music	Composer	
Frank Huang	Music	Violinist; concertmaster, New York Philharmonic	
Benjamin Kamins	Music	Bassoonist; principal, Houston Symphony	
Milton Katims	Music	Violist and conductor; principal violist, NBC Symphony Orchestra; music director, Seattle Symphony Orchestra	
Fredell Lack	Music	Violinist	
Martyna Majok	Theatre	Pulitzer Prize-winning playwright	
Mark Medoff	Theatre	Playwright, screenwriter, actor; Tony Award, Oscar nomination	
Brett Mitchell	Music	Conductor; music director, Colorado Symphony	
Bill Moffit	Music	Director of marching bands at UH and other universities; composer, arranger ("Soundpower Series"), and marching innovator	
Elena Nikolaidi	Music	Opera singer	
Stuart Ostrow	Theatre	Playwright, theatrical director, and Tony Award-winning producer	
Howard Pollack	Music	Musicologist	
Theresa Rebeck	Theatre	Playwright	
Kevin Rigdon	Theatre	Scenic designer	
Hal Robinson	Music	Classical string bassist; principal, Philadelphia Orchestra and National Symphony Orchestra (U.S.)	
A. Clyde Roller	Music	Conductor	
Beatrice Schroeder Rose	Music	Harpist; principal, Houston Symphony	
Jade Simmons	Arts leadership	Pianist, arts advocate, former beauty queen	
Abbey Simon	Music	Pianist	
W. Stephen Smith	Music	Voice teacher and author of The Naked Voice; faculty 1990–98	
Patsy Swayze	Theatre	Film choreographer; taught dance at the University of Houston for 18 years	
Laszlo Varga	Music	Cellist; principal, New York Philharmonic	
Lanford Wilson	Theatre	Playwright; won Pulitzer Prize for Talley's Folly	

=== Visual arts ===
Name	Department	Notability	Reference
Keliy Anderson-Staley	Art	Photographer	
Michael Ray Charles	Art	Painter	
Luis Jiménez	Art	Sculptor	
George Krause	Art	Established UH photography program	
Rick Lowe	Art	Visual artist, social activist, MacArthur Fellow	
Abinadi Meza	Art	Sound artist, conceptual artist, filmmaker; was awarded a Rome Prize	
Masaru Takiguchi	Art	Sculptor, educator	

=== Science and technology ===
Name	Department	Notability	Reference
Neal Amundson	Chemical and Biomolecular Engineering	Research on air quality issues; United States National Academy of Sciences, National Academy of Engineering, American Academy of Arts and Sciences, Guggenheim Fellow, NAE Founders' Award	
David P. Anderson	Computer science	Space research scientist	
Kevin Bassler	Physics, Mathematics	Fellow of the American Physical Society	
Peter C. Bishop	Future studies	Futurist	
Eric R. Bittner	Chemistry	Guggenheim Fellow	
Irvin Borish	Optometry	Optometrist, educator	
Maurice Brookhart	Chemistry	Research in organometallic chemistry; member, National Academy of Sciences	
Patrick Callaerts	Biology	Molecular biologist	
Shiing-Shen Chern	Mathematics	Research in differential geometry	
Wynne Chin	Decision and Information Sciences	Information technologist	
Chu Ching-wu (Paul Chu)	Physics	Leader in superconductivity research, U.S. National Medal of Science	
Vaughn Climenhaga	Mathematics	Distinguished professor at the University of North Carolina at Charlotte	
Joseph Colaco	Architecture	Structural engineer, architect; member, National Academy of Engineers	
David Criswell	Space systems	Director of the Institute for Space Systems Operations at UH	
Bonnie Dunbar	Engineering	Director, UH STEM Center; former NASA astronaut, president of the Museum of Flight, member of National Academy of Engineering	
Siemion Fajtlowicz	Mathematics	Developed Graffiti computer program	
George E. Fox	Biology	Researcher in cell biology	
Roland Glowinski	Mathematics	Research in partial differential equations, variational inequalities	
Jan-Åke Gustafsson	Biosciences & Nutrition	Leading researcher in hormone function; Royal Swedish Academy of Sciences, Royal Swedish Academy of Engineering Sciences, United States National Academy of Sciences	
Eva Harth	Chemistry	Director, Welch Center of Excellence in Polymer Chemistry, UH	
Andy Hines	Future studies	Futurist	
Fazle Hussain	Mechanical engineering	Engineer	
Lennart Johnsson	Computer science	Hugh and Lillie Roy Cranz Cullen Distinguished Chair of Computer Science, Mathematics, and Electrical and Computer Engineering, UH; research in grid computing	
Ioannis Kakadiaris	Computer science	Developed an identity verification system	
Alamgir Karim	Chemical and Biomolecular Engineering	Dow Chair and Welch Foundation Professor; director, International Polymer & Soft Matter Center	
Włodzimierz Kuperberg	Mathematics	Research in geometry and topology	
John H. Lienhard	Mechanical engineering	Writer and host of PBS program The Engines of Our Ingenuity; National Academy of Engineering; UH professor emeritus	
R. Bowen Loftin	Computer science	Former chair of UH Department of Computer Science; now president of Texas A&M University	
Dan Luss	Chemical engineering	Chemical engineer, National Academy of Engineering	
Archer John Porter Martin	Chemistry	Winner of 1952 Nobel Prize in Chemistry for invention of partition chromatography	
Joseph L. McCauley	Physics	Research in econophysics, nonlinear dynamics, statistical physics	
Claudia Neuhauser	Research	UH associate vice president/associate vice chancellor for Research and Technology Transfer	
Yih-Ho Michael Pao	Mechanical engineering	Hydro-engineer, entrepreneur, National Academy of Engineering	
Steven Pennings	Biology, biochemistry	Research on coastal ecosystems	
B. Montgomery Pettitt	Chemistry	Cullen Professor	
Andrea Prosperetti	Mechanical engineering	Distinguished professor; research in multiphase flow, scientific computing, fluid dynamics, applied mathematics, bubble dynamics; National Academy of Engineering	
Megan Robertson (scientist)	Chemical and Biomolecular Engineering	Polymer materials scientist; fellow, American Chemical Society; director, UH Materials Science and Engineering Program	
Badri Roysam	Electrical and computer engineering	Image processing; Fellow, Institute of Electrical and Electronics Engineers (IEEE); chair, UH Department of Electrical and Computer Engineering	
Barbara A. Schaal	Biology	Evolutionary biologist	
Jerome Schultz	Engineering	Bioengineer	
Ronald M. Sega	Physics	NASA astronaut	
Venkat Selvamanickam	Mechanical engineering, physics	Chair, UH Mechanical Engineering Department; director of Applied Research Hub, Texas Center for Superconductivity	
John Suppe	Geology	Geologist, United States National Academy of Sciences	
Leon Thomsen	Earth and atmospheric sciences	UH professor of geophysics, proposed Thomsen parameters to characterize transversely isotropic materials	
Adam Thrasher	Health and Human Performance	Author of Space Moose	
Arthur C. Vailas	Biology, mechanical engineering	Biochemist, scholar; later president of Idaho State University	
Mary Wheeler	Mathematics	Research in partial differential equations	
Richard C. Willson	Chemical and Biomolecular Engineering	Biochemical engineer; National Academy of Inventors	
Donald R. Wilton	Electrical and Computer Engineering	Electrical engineer, National Academy of Engineering	
