= Mo Mitchell =

Mo Mitchell may refer to:

- Little Mo Mitchell, a fictional character from the BBC soap opera EastEnders, played by Kacey Ainsworth
- Mo Mitchell (coach), head gymnastics coach at the University of Kentucky
- Mow Mitchell (1886–1980), American rugby union player
- Mo Mitchell (singer), a Filipino singer, rapper, and actor
