= Steven Pennings =

American biologist and biochemist

Steven C. Pennings is an American biologist and biochemist currently the John and Rebecca Moores Professor at University of Houston.
