= Ioannis Kakadiaris =

Greek-born American computer scientist

Ioannis A. Kakadiaris is a Greek-born American computer scientist who has developed an identity verification system at the University of Houston. He is a Hugh Roy and Lillie Cranz Cullen University Professor of Computer Science, Electrical & Computer Engineering, and Biomedical Engineering at the University of Houston, a position to which he was appointed in 2011.

== Early life and education ==
Ioannis A. Kakadiaris received his BSc in physics (1989) from the University of Athens. After moving to the United States, he received MSc in computer science (1991) from Northeastern University (Boston, MA) and his PhD in computer science (1997) from the University of Pennsylvania (Philadelphia, PA).

== Identity verification system ==
The system works by extracting a unique biometric signature of a person's face based on combination of 3D shape, texture, infrared, and time variables. While earlier face recognition methods have focused on appearance - capturing, representing, and matching facial characteristics as they appear on 2D images in the visible spectrum, the proposed URxD system uses a webcam to capture a continuous video stream which is used to detect whether a person is facing the 3D camera, and if the subject is facing the camera relatively still for more than two seconds, the system triggers the optical scanner and the 3D data are captured. It can also determine whether the person is wearing glasses. The system has achieved the best published results when tried to 4,007 datasets as a part of the international face recognition Grand Challenge organized by NIST in 2007.
