= Kevin Bassler =

American physicist

Academic background
- Education: Carnegie Mellon University

Kevin E. Bassler is an American physicist, currently the John and Rebecca Moores Professor of Physics and Mathematics at the University of Houston.

In 2014, Bassler was elected a Fellow of the American Physical Society "for seminal and sustained contributions to the understanding of the dynamics of complex systems, particularly concerning non-equilibrium phase transitions, emergent behavior, and dynamics in adaptive networks."
