= Chinhui Juhn =

American labor economist

- Born: South Korea
- Education: Yale University (BA); University of Chicago (PhD)
- Spouse: Edward R. Allen III
- Children: 2
- Scientific career
- Fields: labor economics
- Workplaces: University of Houston
- Website: https://www.uh.edu/~cjuhn/

Chinhui Juhn is the Henry Graham Professor of Economics at the University of Houston, a Research Associate of the National Bureau of Economic Research, and a Research Fellow of IZA Institute of Labor Economics. She graduated from Yale University in 1984, and completed her PhD in economics at the University of Chicago in 1991. She is an Editor of the American Economic Review, one of the most cited journals in the world. Together with her husband, Edward R. Allen III, she is a patron of the arts in Houston.

== Research ==
Juhn's dozens of published papers have included such topics as wage inequality, labor force participation, earnings instability, and the impact of trade policies on gender inequality. Her work describing various features of the labor market has been cited many times in the New York Times.

=== Selected works ===
- Juhn, Chinhui, Kevin M. Murphy, and Brooks Pierce. "Wage inequality and the rise in returns to skill." Journal of political Economy 101, no. 3 (1993): 410–442.
- Juhn, Chinhui, Kevin M. Murphy, and Brooks Pierce. "Accounting for the slowdown in black-white wage convergence." Workers and their wages (1991): 107–43.
- Juhn, Chinhui, and Kevin M. Murphy. "Wage inequality and family labor supply." Journal of labor economics 15, no. 1, Part 1 (1997): 72–97.
- Juhn, Chinhui, Kevin M. Murphy, Robert H. Topel, Janet L. Yellen, and Martin Neil Baily. "Why has the natural rate of unemployment increased over time?." Brookings Papers on Economic Activity 1991, no. 2 (1991): 75–142.
- Juhn, Chinhui. "Decline of male labor market participation: The role of declining market opportunities." The Quarterly Journal of Economics 107, no. 1 (1992): 79–121.
- Juhn, Chinhui, Gergely Ujhelyi, and Carolina Villegas-Sanchez. "Men, women, and machines: How trade impacts gender inequality." Journal of Development Economics 106 (2014): 179–193.
