= Karen Katz =

American author and illustrator

- Born: Karen Katz; September 16, 1947 (age 78); Newark, New Jersey, United States
- Citizenship: American
- Occupation(s): Writer, illustrator
- Years active: 1997–present
- Spouse: Gary Richards (m. 1999)
- Children: 1
- Website: www.karenkatz.com

Karen Katz (born September 16, 1947) is an American author and illustrator of children's books.

Her first book, Over the Moon, was inspired by the experience of adopting her daughter Lena from Central America.

== Partial bibliography ==
- Over the Moon: An Adoption Tale, Henry Holt and Co., 1997
- The Colors of Us, Henry Holt and Co., 1999
- Where Is Baby's Belly Button?, Little Simon, 2000
- Counting Kisses, Margaret K. McElderry, 2001
- Where is Baby's Mommy?, Little Simon, 2001
- Grandma and Me, Little Simon, 2002
- Excuse Me!: A Little Book of Manners, Grosset & Dunlap, 2002
- No Biting!, Grosset & Dunlap, 2002
- Toes, Ears & Nose!, Little Simon, 2003
- Daddy and Me, Little Simon, 2003
- Counting Christmas, Margaret K. McElderry, 2003
- My First Kwanzaa, Henry Holt and Co., 2003
- Grandpa and Me, Little Simon, 2004
- I Can Share!, Grosset & Dunlap, 2004
- No Hitting!, Grosset & Dunlap, 2004
- What Does Baby Say?, Little Simon, 2004
- A Potty for Me!, Little Simon, 2005
- Daddy Hugs, Margaret K. McElderry, 2005
- My First Chinese New Year, Henry Holt and Co., 2005
- Ten Tiny Tickles, Margaret K. McElderry, 2005
- Can You Say Peace?, Henry Holt and Co., 2006
- Mommy Hugs, Margaret K. McElderry, 2006
- Wiggle Your Toes, Little Simon, 2006
- Best-Ever Big Brother, Grosset & Dunlap, 2006
- Best-Ever Big Sister, Grosset & Dunlap, 2006
- Where Is Baby's Pumpkin?, Little Simon, 2006
- Where Is Baby's Valentine?, Little Simon, 2006
- Peek-A-Baby, Little Simon, 2007
- My First Ramadan, Henry Holt and Co., 2007
- Where Is Baby's Dreidel?, Little Simon, 2007
- Baby's Day, Little Simon, 2007
- Princess Baby, Random House, 2008
- Ten Tiny Babies, Margaret K. McElderry, 2008
- Where Are Baby's Easter Eggs?, Little Simon, 2008
- Where Is Baby's Birthday Cake?,

Little Simon, 2008

- Princess Baby, Night-Night, Random House, 2009
- Shake It Up, Baby!, Little Simon, 2009
- Where Is Baby's Beach Ball?, Little Simon, 2009
- Beddy-Bye, Baby, Little Simon, 2009
- Where Is Baby's Christmas Present?, Little Simon, 2009
- Baby at the Farm, Little Simon, 2009
- Baby's Colors, Little Simon, 2010
- Baby's Shapes, Little Simon, 2010
- Baby's Numbers, Little Simon, 2010
- Where is Baby's Puppy?, Little Simon, 2011
- The Babies on the Bus, Henry Holt and Co., 2011
