= Sandra Gin =

American journalist

- Occupation: News anchor/Reporter
- Years active: 1994 – 2002

Sandra Gin is a broadcast journalist who served as news anchor/reporter for KHOU-TV in Houston, Texas from 1994 to 2002.

Sandra was a news anchor and reporter with KHOU-TV in Houston from 1994 to 2002.

== Awards ==
- 1997, won Suncoast Regional Emmy Award for best News Oriented Special on International Issues, Hong Kong: Under the Dragon, an examination of the handover of Hong Kong to Communist China
- 2009, won Daytime Emmy Award as producer of the series Christina's Court
