= Keqin Li =

Chinese computer scientist (born 1963)

Keqin Li (Chinese: 李克勤) was born in Songjiang, Shanghai, China, on May 26, 1963. He received a B.S. degree in computer science from Tsinghua University in 1985, and a Ph.D. degree in computer science from the University of Houston in 1990. He is a Distinguished Alumnus of the Computer Science Department at the University of Houston.

He is currently a SUNY Distinguished Professor in the State University of New York at New Paltz. He is also a member of the SUNY Distinguished Academy.

He was the originator of processor allocation and job scheduling in partitionable mesh connected systems. With Kam-Hoi Cheng, he was the initiator of three-dimensional box packing. He was one of the creators of the linear array with a reconfigurable pipelined bus system (LARPBS) computing model and also a principal contributor to parallel computing using optical interconnections.

He was elevated to Fellow of the Institute of Electrical and Electronics Engineers (IEEE) and the IEEE Computer Society in 2015 for contributions to parallel and distributed computing.
