= Mo Mitchell (coach) =

American gymnastics coach

Mo Mitchell is an athletic coach. He was the head gymnastics coach at the University of Kentucky. He coached the Wildcats gymnastics program from 2005 to 2010. In 2006, he led Kentucky to its first winning season in 13 years, and only the second in program history. In 2008, he duplicated it, by earning his second winning season, including the program's third consecutive trip to the NCAA regionals. In 2006, he earned NCAA Central Region Coach of the Year honors. He is an alumnus of the University of Houston. He is now coaching at Michigan State University.
