= Larry Bell (architect) =

American architect

Larry Bell is an American architect known for his work in space architecture. He is an endowed professor in the University of Houston's Hines College of Architecture. He is also the founding director of the Sasakawa International Center for Space Architecture at the University of Houston, which he founded in 1987, as well as the founder of the Graduate Program in Space Architecture there. He rejects the scientific consensus on climate change. In 2011, for instance, he argued that "The climate issue is one of politics, not of science" and that "...climate changes. It has done so for millions of years. ... But not because of global warming."
