= Badri Roysam =

Indian-American professor and researcher (born 1961)

- Born: Badrinath Roysam; 1961 (age 64–65); India
- Occupation: Professor
- Years active: 1989–present
- Known for: Biological Image Analysis/Brain Tissue Mapping

Badrinath "Badri" Roysam (born 1961) is an Indian-American professor and researcher. He is the current chairman of the Department of Electrical and Computer Engineering at the University of Houston Cullen College of Engineering. Dr. Roysam is notable as the creator of the FARSIGHT project, which is a collaborative effort to create an open source software toolkit to analyze multidimensional images. Roysam's work as a researcher focuses on cancer immunotherapy and neuroscience.

In addition to interdisciplinary collaborations such as FARSIGHT, Dr. Roysam is also a proponent of the Electrical Power Analytics Consortium, which aims to improve the state of the power grid in the hurricane-prone Houston area.

== Education ==
Roysam received his Bachelor of Technology degree from the Indian Institute of Technology (IIT) in 1984. He then went on to earn his master's degree from Washington University in St. Louis in 1987, and his Doctor of Science degree from the same institution in 1989.

== Career ==
Roysam began his career at Rensselaer Polytechnic Institute in Troy, New York in 1989, where he was a professor of electrical and computer engineering. Here, he became director of the Rensselaer branch of the Center for Subsurface Imaging and Sensing Systems (CenSISS) from 2001 until his departure in 2010. CenSISS is a multi-institution and multidisciplinary NSF funded center. In 2006, it was endowed by the Bernard Marshall Gordon foundation and renamed the Bernard Marshall Gordon Center for Subsurface Imaging and Sensing Systems (Gordon-CenSISS).

Roysam initiated the development of FARSIGHT while at RPI, with the intention of developing an interdisciplinary resource for imaging tools. The development of the FARSIGHT project triggered interest, and subsequently funding, from federal institutions such as DARPA and the NIH. The success of FARSIGHT also led to industry collaborations, such as with Kitware, a local New York City company founded by an RPI alumnus.

In 2010, Roysam left RPI for the University of Houston, becoming the Hugh Roy and Lillie Cranz Cullen endowed professor, as well as an administrative role as the chairman of the Electrical and Computer Engineering Department. Here he continued his work with FARSIGHT, and was part of the collaborative effort to develop a tool for the analysis of high dimensional data (STrenD). In recent years, Roysam has been recognized for his research in cancer immunotherapy using bioinformatics. Working in partnership with M.D. Anderson Cancer Center and the Chemical and Biomolecular Engineering Department of the University of Houston, Roysam and his colleagues have developed software that can single out cancer cells and profile their interactions on a cell-to-cell level. This allows close study of immune system cells and how they can be used to neutralize cancer cells.
