= Nippon Foundation =

Japanese non-profit organization

The Nippon Foundation
- Founded: 1 October 1962
- Founder: Ryōichi Sasakawa
- Purpose: Education, healthcare, maritime industry
- Location: 1–2–2 Akasaka, Minato-ku, Tokyo, Japan
- Region served: Global
- Method: Donations and Grants
- Key people: Takeju Ogata, chairman
- Revenue: 30,938,893,000JPY (FY2012)
- Employees: 94 (2012)
- Website: www.nippon-foundation.or.jp/en/

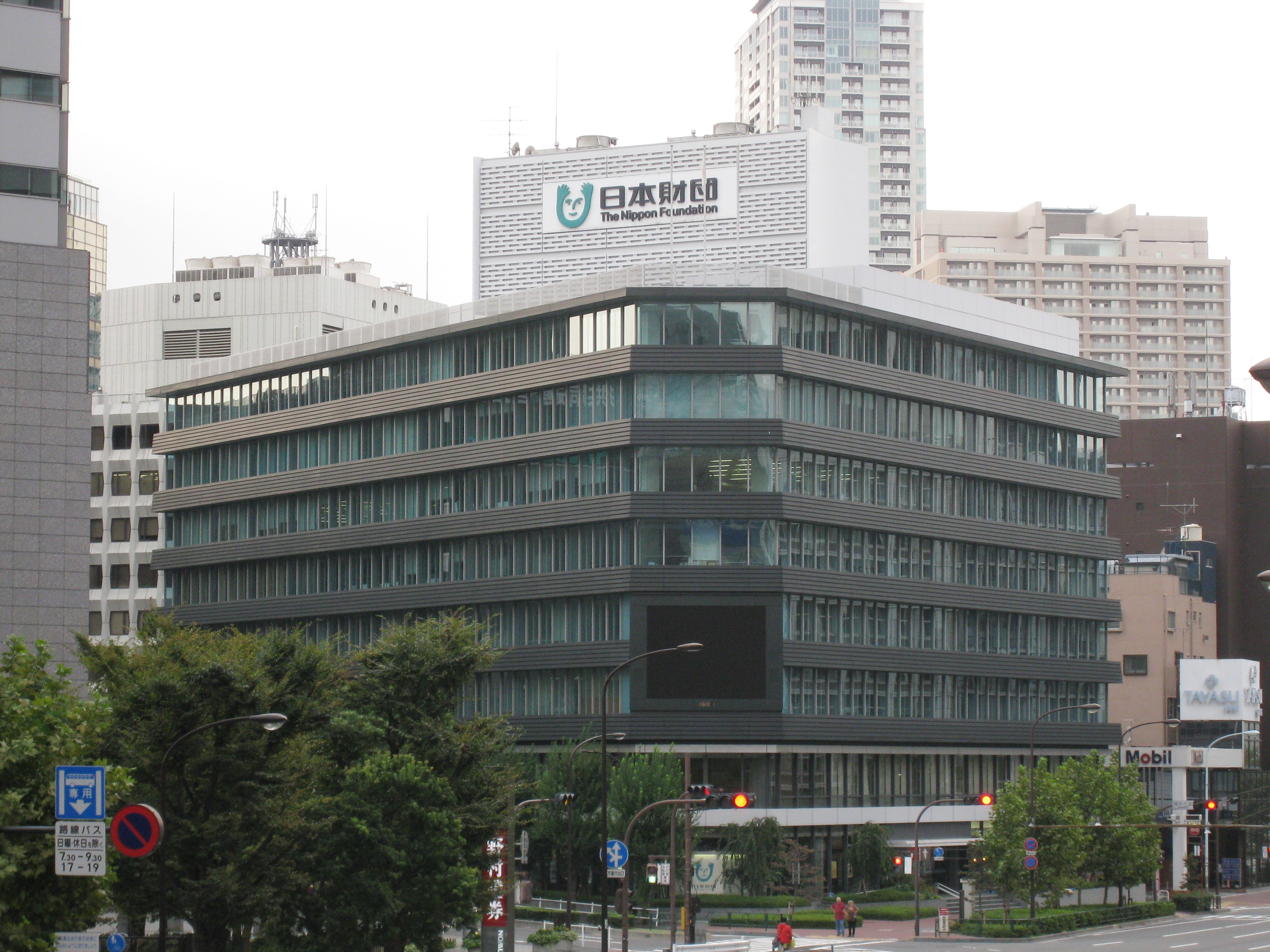
Nippon Foundation headquarters in Akasaka, Tokyo

The Nippon Foundation (日本財団, Nipponzaidan) of Tokyo, Japan, is a private organization promoting humanitarian work, industrial maritime development, and diplomacy. Its chairman is Takeju Ogata.

It was established in 1962 by Ryōichi Sasakawa. His son Yōhei Sasakawa was chairman from 2005 to 2025. The foundation's mission is to direct Japanese motorboat racing revenue into humanitarian work, both at home and abroad, focusing on such fields as public health and education. The foundation is also involved in diplomatic activities through the Sasakawa Peace Foundation. It has also been criticized for promoting Japanese historical negationism, particularly in whitewashing Japanese war crimes.

Chairman of the foundation have been:

- 1962–1995 – Ryōichi Sasakawa: suspected war criminal, businessman, far-right politician, and philanthropist
- 1996–2005 – Ayako Sono: novelist and far-right advocate
- 2005–2025 – Yōhei Sasakawa: World Health Organization Goodwill Ambassador for Leprosy Elimination.
- From 2025: Takeju Ogata

== Examples of major initiatives ==
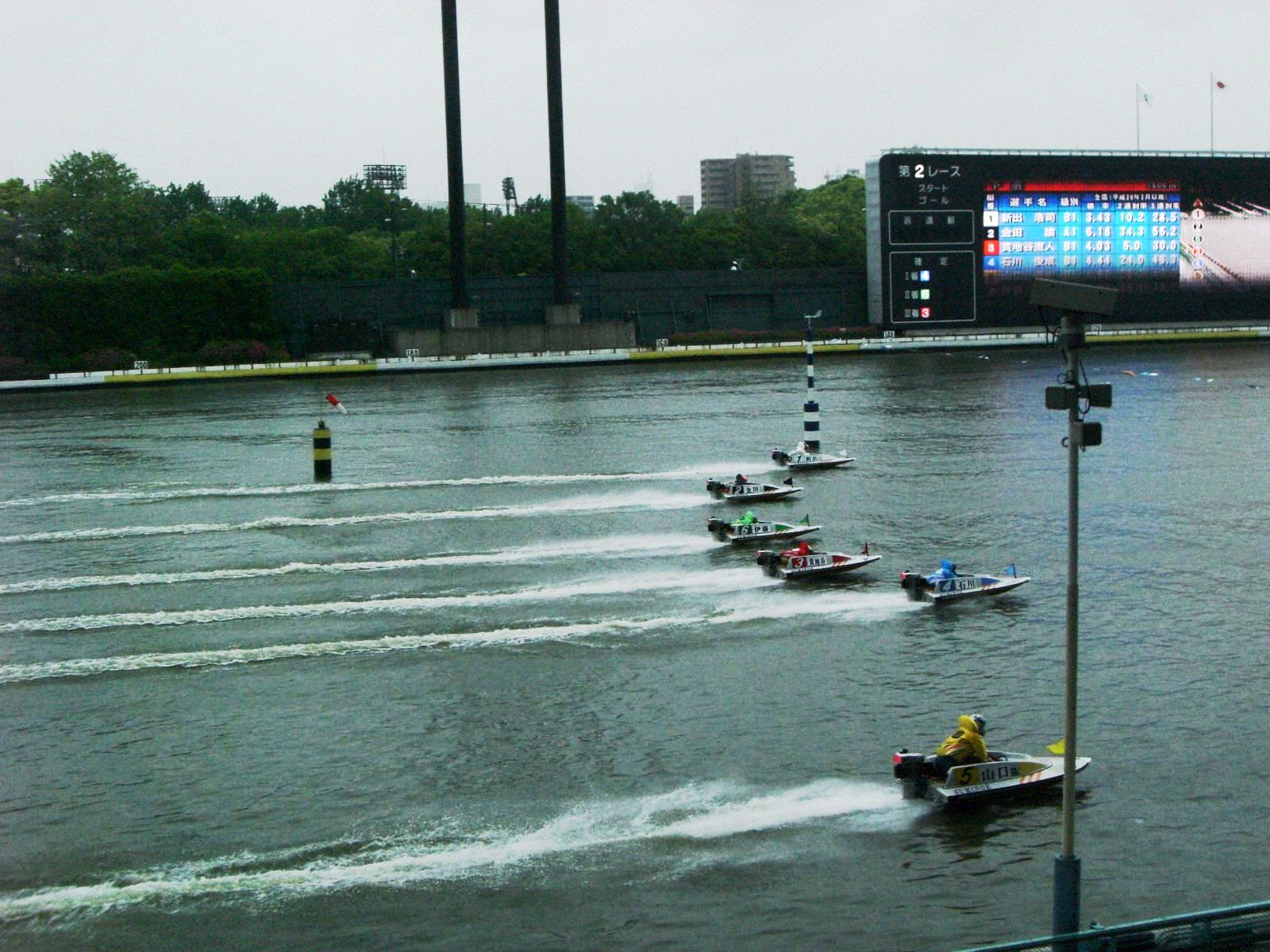
Kyotei boat race

=== 1962–1970 ===
In 1962, The Nippon Foundation was established as the Japan Shipbuilding Industry Foundation under the auspices of the Japanese Motorboat Racing Law. The law and the foundation were initiatives of Ryōichi Sasakawa who, officially used them to both help rebuild the Japanese shipbuilding sector, and to conduct philanthropic activities around the world. This system of using gambling revenue to provide aid to needy sectors was a novel one in Japan at that time, and came under intense scrutiny.

Initiatives pursued in this period include research for the development of super tankers and their engines, direct support for the shipbuilding industry, and the protection of safety in the Strait of Malacca—vital to Japan's national security, due to the fact that more than 80 percent of her oil passes this way.

In the field of public welfare, the foundation pursued such youth-oriented initiatives as the building of sports facilities, the building of day care centers and the promotion of traffic safety education. In addition, it began donating mobile clinics and blood-mobiles, as well as constructing blood banks around the country.

=== 1971–1980 ===
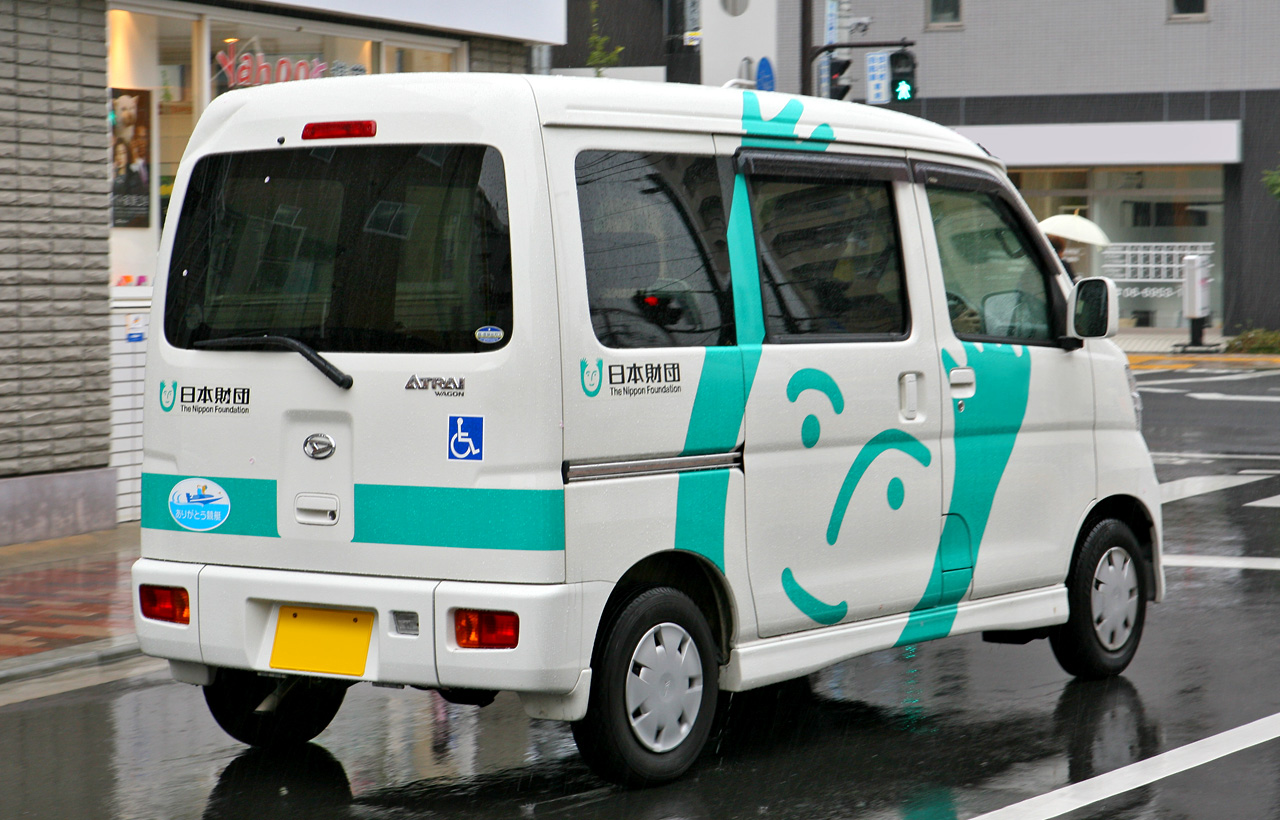
Vehicle with wheelchair slope

In the 1970s, the foundation continued to pursue its efforts to improve social services through such measures as the distribution of ambulances, training in the use of fire fighting equipment, the development of preventative measures for earthquakes and PR for the fire-fighting sector. It also donated medical ships to provide medical aid for people living on remote islands in Japan's inland sea.

In 1974, establishment of the Sasakawa Memorial Health Foundation for the purpose of eliminating leprosy as a public health problem—an effort that has resulted in its elimination in all but 1 of the 122 countries where the disease was initially prevalent.

=== 1981–1990 ===
Support for the maritime world remained an important focus in the 1980s, building on the work of the previous decade. Examples of projects include "Swift Wings", which was a sail system designed for modern cargo ships, and research toward a "Techno Superliner", a 1,000-ton cargo vessel that could attain speeds of up to 50 knots.

On the international cooperative support front, the foundation involved itself heavily in disaster relief, sending aid to help the victims of major disasters in countries around the world, and establishing the United Nations Sasakawa Award for Disaster Relief.

Health initiatives that began in this decade include the establishment of the WHO Sasakawa Health prize and a massive project to aid the victims of the Chernobyl nuclear power disaster, under which the foundation spent a total of more than US$50 million over ten years, screening over 200,000 children for thyroid cancer.

In response to the Ethiopian famine of the mid-1980s, the foundation began a program of agricultural education throughout sub-Saharan Africa that eventually reached 14 countries, improving farmers' yields by up to six times in some places.

Finally, as a part of its human resources development program, the foundation created the Sasakawa Young Leaders' Fellowship Fund, a program that would eventually establish million-dollar funds at a total of 68 major universities around the world.

=== 1991–2000 ===
In the 1990s, on the home front, the Nippon Foundation invested heavily in the elderly of Japan, pushing for the improvement of retirement homes, building model retirement homes, and helping the nation to develop its hospice system nearly from the ground up. Related to this field, the foundation also began donating specially equipped vehicles to social welfare facilities and groups, enabling them to provide mobility services to the elderly and those with disability.

The decade also saw one of Japan's worst earthquakes of the 20th century, and the disorganization of volunteer groups in the wake of the quake lead the foundation to put special attention on bringing these many groups together under one umbrella—the volunteer support center—a central body that coordinated volunteer effort in the event of a major disaster.

In the maritime development field, the foundation began to turn its eye to the disparity in the level of training received by maritime experts in various countries. As a result, it provided funding for a scholarship for people from developing countries to attend the World Maritime University in Malmö, Sweden. In perhaps an even broader effort, it created the International Association of Maritime Universities, uniting 50 institutions around the world, in an effort to standardize both the level of education and the materials used.

=== 2001–present ===
The Foundation supported both a display of a North Korean spy vessel that had been sunk by the Japanese Self Defense Forces, and a survey of Okinotori Island, disputed by China, South Korea, and Taïwan.

In addition, the foundation is providing support toward the establishment of a user-pays system to help the nations surrounding the Strait of Malacca in their efforts to both police the waters and maintain their environmental integrity.

In international affairs, the foundation has most recently built more than 100 elementary schools in Myanmar and 100 in Cambodia. It has established a novel program to provide Mongolian nomadic families with boxes full of traditional medicines that can be replenished, at the cost only of those medicines used, a few times a year, when they come to market.

Following the start of the Russian invasion of Ukraine, the Nippon Foundation has provided aid to 1,921 Ukrainians for travel and living expenses in Japan as evacuees, a status distinct from refugees, whom Japan accepts in limited numbers. The foundation's support, totaling 8.58 billion yen ($64 million), is committed for three years and will be limited to 2,000 recipients. In June 2024, the Nippon Foundation also established the Ukrainian Evacuees Assistance Fund. The fund was closed at the end of March 2024 (circa 200 million yen donations as of March 5, 2024).

== Controversies ==
=== Peru National Program for Reproductive Health and Family Planning ===
According to conclusion of the Investigative Commission appointed by the Peru Congress, the Nippon Foundation was one of the organizations providing financial support for the forced sterilizations of impoverished Peruvians, initially laid out in the leaked documents of "Plan Verde" and subsequently executed by the Alberto Fujimori government as part of its National Population Program.

=== Fukushima accident ===
On September 11 and 12, 2011, six months after the earthquake that devastated the Tohoku region, an international conference on the effects of ionizing radiation on health was held at the Fukushima Faculty of Medicine. The conference was funded by the Nippon Foundation, among others.

Some speakers downplayed the health effects of low-level radiation and also denounced the paranoid fear of the population, including controversial endocrynologist Shunichi Yamashita.

== Organizations established ==
- The Blue Sea and Green Land Foundation
- Fondation Franco-Japonaise Sasakawa
- Foundation for Encouragement of Social Contribution
- The Great Britain Sasakawa Foundation
- Japan Gateball Union
- The Japan Science Society
- Japan Social Innovation Investment Foundation
- The Japanese Foundation for the Promotion of Maritime Science and The Museum of Maritime Science
- Marine Sports Foundation
- Nippon Ginkenshibu Foundation
- Nippon Music Foundation
- Nippon Taiko Foundation
- The Nippon Foundation Human Milk Bank
- The Nippon Foundation SPOGOMI Federation
- Ocean Policy Research Foundation
- Sasakawa Africa Association
- Sasakawa Health Science Foundation
- The Sasakawa Japan-China Friendship Fund
- Sasakawa Memorial Health Foundation
- The Sasakawa Peace Foundation
- The Sasakawa Pan-Asia Fund
- Sasakawa Sports Foundation
- The Scandinavia-Japan Sasakawa Foundation
- The Tokyo Foundation for Policy Research
- The Sasakawa International Center for Space Architecture (SICSA)
- Nereus Program
