= Laurie Bell =

Laurie Bell may refer to:

- Laurie Bell (footballer) (born 1992), English footballer
- Laurie Bell (Scottish footballer) (1875–1933), Scottish footballer

== See also ==
- Lawrence Bell (disambiguation)
- Lauren Bell (disambiguation)
- Larry Bell (disambiguation)
- Lurrie Bell (born 1958), American musician
