= Lauren Bell (disambiguation) =

Lauren Bell (born 2001) is an English cricketer.

Lauren Bell may also refer to:

- Lauren Bell (cyclist) (born 1999), Scottish cyclist
- Lauren Bell, English activist in the search for her mother's killer in the Murder of Penny Bell
- Lauren Bell, fictional character in Slam (1998 film)

== See also ==
- Laurie Bell (disambiguation)
- Lawrence Bell (disambiguation)
