= Larry Bell =

Larry Bell may refer to:

- Larry Bell (architect), American architect and professor at the University of Houston
- Larry Bell (artist) (born 1939), contemporary artist based in Los Angeles, California and Taos, New Mexico
- Larry Bell, founder of Bell's Brewery
- Larry Gene Bell (1949–1996), double murderer in Lexington County, South Carolina
- Larry M. Bell (born 1939), Democratic member of the North Carolina General Assembly
- Larry Thomas Bell (born 1952), American composer, pianist and music professor
- Lawrence Dale Bell (1894–1956), founder of Bell Aircraft Corporation
- Larry Bell (javelin thrower) (born 1916), American javelin thrower, runner-up at the 1938 NCAA track and field championships

== See also ==
- Lawrence Bell (disambiguation)
