= Space architecture =

Architecture of off-planet habitable structures

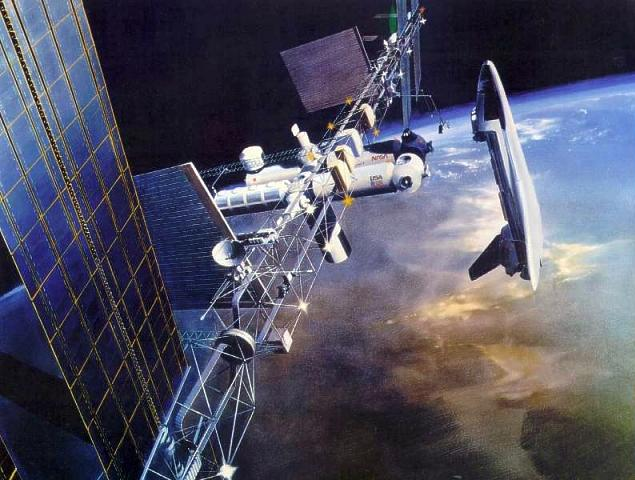
A 1990 artist rendering of Space Station Freedom, a project that eventually evolved into the International Space Station

Space architecture is the theory and practice of designing and building inhabited environments in outer space. It borrows from multiple forms of niche architecture to accomplish the task of ensuring human beings can live and work in space.

The architectural approach to spacecraft design addresses the total built environment. It combines the fields of architecture and engineering (especially aerospace engineering), and also involves diverse disciplines such as industrial design, physiology, psychology, and sociology.

== Etymology ==
This mission statement for space architecture was developed in 2002 by participants in the 1st Space Architecture Symposium, organized at the World Space Congress in Houston, by the Aerospace Architecture Subcommittee, Design Engineering Technical Committee (DETC), American Institute of Aeronautics and Astronautics (AIAA).The subcommittee rose to the status of an independent Space Architecture Technical Committee (SATC) of the AIAA in 2008. The SATC routinely organizes technical sessions at several conferences, including AIAA ASCEND, the International Conference on Environmental Systems (ICES), the International Astronautical Congress (IAC), and the American Society of Civil Engineers (ASCE) Earth & Space conference.

There is some debate over the terminology of space architecture. Some consider the field to be a specialty within architecture that applies architectural principles to space applications. Others such as Theodore W. Hall of the University of Michigan see space architects as generalists, with what is traditionally considered architecture (Earth-bound or terrestrial architecture) being a subset of a broader space architecture. Any structures that fly in space will likely remain for some time highly dependent on Earth-based infrastructure and personnel for financing, development, construction, launch, and operation. Therefore, it is a matter of discussion how much of these earthly assets are to be considered part of space architecture. The technicalities of the term space architecture are open to some level of interpretation.

== History ==
Ideas of people traveling to space were first published in science fiction stories, like Jules Verne's 1865 From the Earth to the Moon. Elements then imagined necessary for space travel included telescopes, pickaxes and shovels, firearms, oxygen generators, and even trees. A curved sofa was built into the floor and walls and windows near the tip of the spacecraft were accessible by ladder. The projectile was shaped like a bullet because it was gun-launched from the ground, a method infeasible for transporting man to space due to the high acceleration forces produced. It would take rocketry to get humans to the cosmos.

An illustration of Wernher von Braun's rotating space station concept

The first serious theoretical work published on space travel by means of rocket power was by Konstantin Tsiolkovsky in 1903. Besides being the father of astronautics he conceived such ideas as the space elevator (inspired by the Eiffel Tower), a rotating space station that created artificial gravity along the outer circumference, airlocks, space suits for extra-vehicular activity (EVA), closed ecosystems to provide food and oxygen, and solar power in space. Tsiolkovsky believed human occupation of space was the inevitable path for our species. In 1952 Wernher von Braun published his own inhabited space station concept in a series of magazine articles. His design was an upgrade of earlier concepts, but he took the unique step in going directly to the public with it. The spinning space station would have three decks and was to function as a navigational aid, meteorological station, Earth observatory, military platform, and way point for further exploration missions to outer space. It is said that the space station depicted in the 1968 film 2001: A Space Odyssey traces its design heritage to Von Braun's work. Wernher von Braun went on to devise mission schemes to the Moon and Mars, each time publishing his grand plans in Collier's Weekly.

The flight of Yuri Gagarin on April 12, 1961, was humanity's maiden spaceflight. While the mission was a necessary first step, Gagarin was more or less confined to a chair with a small view port from which to observe the cosmos – a far cry from the possibilities of life in space. Following space missions gradually improved living conditions and quality of life in low Earth orbit. Expanding room for movement, physical exercise regimens, sanitation facilities, improved food quality, and recreational activities all accompanied longer mission durations. Architectural involvement in space was realized in 1968 when a group of architects and industrial designers led by Raymond Loewy, over objections from engineers, prevailed in convincing NASA to include an observation window in the Skylab orbital laboratory. This milestone represents the introduction of the human psychological dimension to spacecraft design. Space architecture was born.

The practice of involving architects in the space program grew out of the Space Race, although its origins can be seen much earlier. The need for their involvement stemmed from the push to extend space mission durations and address the needs of astronauts beyond minimum survival needs.

Much space architecture work has focused on design concepts for orbital space stations and lunar and Martian exploration ships and surface bases for the world's space agencies, including NASA, ESA, JAXA, CSA, Roscosmos, and CNSA.

== Theory ==
The subject of architectural theory has much application in space architecture. Some considerations, though are uniquely applicable in the space context.

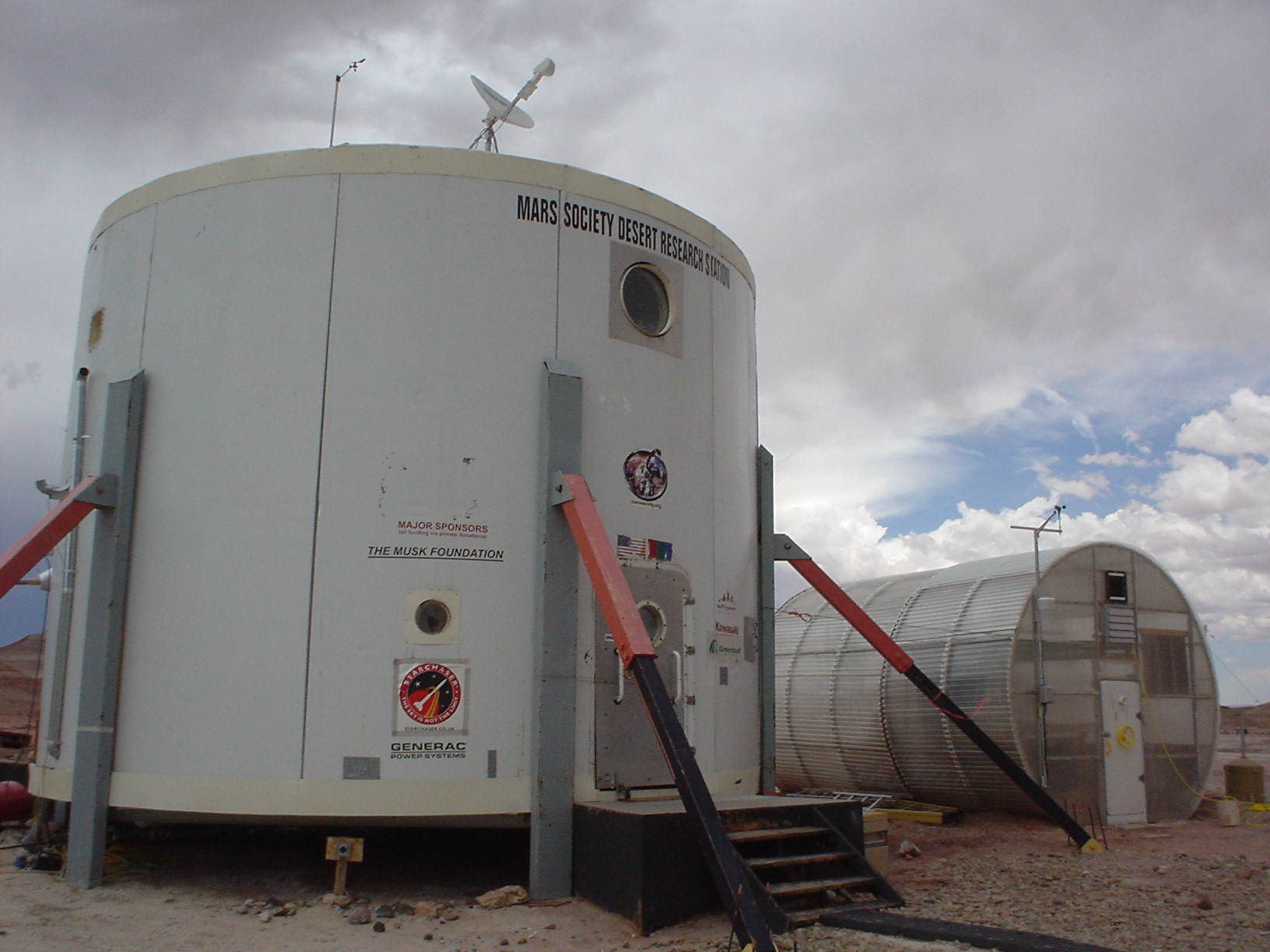
The Mars Desert Research Station is located in the Utah desert because of its relative similarity to the Martian surface

A starting point for space architecture theory is the search for extreme environments in terrestrial settings for the formation of analogs between these environments and space.Many of these analogs can actively define design references for space systems. Space station life support systems and astronaut survival gear for emergency landings are similarity to submarine life support systems and military pilot survival kits, respectively.

Human spaceflight require extensive preparation,where a well defined ECLSS can serve as testbeds to further develop technologies for space applications and train astronaut crews. Contemporary examples included Mars 500 and the Flashline Mars Arctic Research Station is a simulated Mars base. To train for EVAs in microgravity, space agencies make broad use of underwater and simulator training. The Neutral Buoyancy Laboratory, NASA's underwater training facility, contains full-scale mockups of the Space Shuttle cargo bay and International Space Station modules. Technology development and astronaut training in space-analogous environments are essential to making living in space possible.

=== In space ===
Fundamental to space architecture is designing for physical and psychological wellness in space. Rigorous exercise regimens are required to alleviate muscular atrophy and other effects of space on the body. Space missions are often fixed in duration that can lead to stress from isolation. This problem is not unlike that faced in remote research stations or military tours of duty, although non-standard gravity conditions can exacerbate feelings of unfamiliarity and homesickness. Furthermore, confinement in limited and unchanging physical spaces appears to magnify interpersonal tensions in small crews and contribute to other negative psychological effects. These stresses can be mitigated by establishing regular contact with family and friends on Earth, maintaining health, incorporating recreational activities, and bringing along familiar items such as photographs and green plants. The importance of these psychological measures were most noticeably seen in the 1968 Soviet 'DLB Lunar Base' design:

...it was planned that the units on the Moon would have a false window, showing scenes of the Earth countryside that would change to correspond with the season back in Moscow. The exercise bicycle was equipped with a synchronized film projector, that allowed the cosmonaut to take a 'ride' out of Moscow with return.

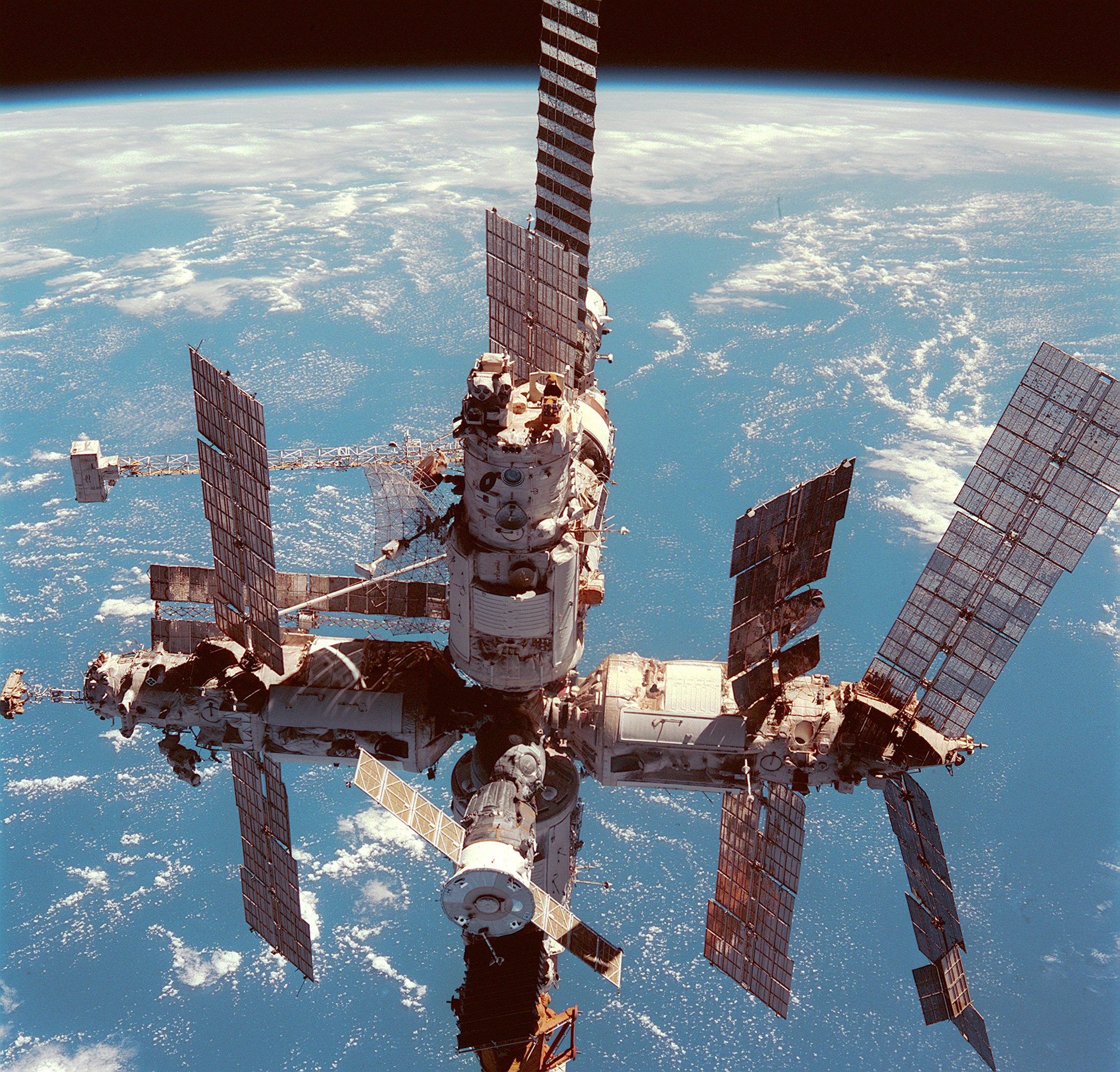
Mir was the first true 'modular' space station. This approach allows a habitat to function before assembly is complete and its design can be changed by swapping modules.

The challenge of getting anything at all to space, due to launch constraints, has had a profound effect on the physical shapes of space architecture. All space habitats to date have either been launched as a unit or have used modular architecture design. Payload fairing dimensions of launch vehicles limit the size of rigid components launched into space. This approach to building large scale structures in space involves launching multiple modules separately and then manually assembling them afterward. Modular architecture results in a layout similar to a tunnel system where passage through several modules is often required to reach any particular destination. It also tends to standardize the internal diameter or width of pressurized rooms, with machinery and furniture placed along the circumference. These types of space stations and surface bases can generally only grow by adding additional modules in one or more direction. Finding adequate working and living space is often a major challenge with modular architecture. As a solution, flexible furniture units have been used to transform interiors for different functions and change the partitioning between private and group space.

Eugène Viollet-le-Duc advocated different architectural forms for different materials. This is especially important in space architecture. The mass constraints with launching push engineers to find ever lighter materials with adequate material properties. Moreover, challenges unique to the orbital space environment, such as rapid thermal expansion due to abrupt changes in solar exposure, and corrosion caused by particle and atomic oxygen bombardment, require unique materials solutions. Just as the industrial age produced new materials and opened up new architectural possibilities, advances in materials technology will change the prospects of space architecture. Carbon-fiber is already being incorporated into space hardware because of its high strength-to-weight ratio. Investigations are underway to see whether carbon-fiber or other composite materials will be adopted for major structural components in space. The architectural principle that champions using the most appropriate materials and leaving their nature unadorned is called truth to materials.

=== Ground infrastructure ===
Human spaceflight currently requires a great deal of supporting infrastructure on Earth. All human orbital missions to date have been government-orchestrated. The organizational body that manages space missions is typically a national space agency, NASA in the case of the United States and Roscosmos for Russia. These agencies are funded at the federal level. At NASA, flight controllers are responsible for real-time mission operations and work onsite at NASA Centers. Most engineering development work involved with space vehicles is contracted-out to private companies, who in turn may employ subcontractors of their own, while fundamental research and conceptual design is often done in academia through research funding.

A notable difference between the orbital context of space architecture and Earth-based architecture is that structures in orbit do not need to support their own weight. This is possible because of the microgravity condition of objects in free fall. In fact much space hardware, such as the Space Shuttle's robotic arm, is designed only to function in orbit and would not be able to lift its own weight on the Earth's surface. Microgravity also allows an astronaut to move an object of practically any mass, albeit slowly, provided he or she is adequately constrained to another object. Therefore, structural considerations for the orbital environment are dramatically different from those of terrestrial buildings, and the biggest challenge to holding a space station together is usually launching and assembling the components intact. Construction on extraterrestrial surfaces still needs to be designed to support its own weight, but its weight will depend on the strength of the local gravitational field.

== Varieties ==
=== Orbital ===
Orbital architecture is the architecture of structures designed to orbit around the Earth or another astronomical object. Examples of currently-operational orbital architecture are the International Space Station,Tiangong, Soyuz and Shenzhou spacecraft. Historical craft include the Mir space station, Skylab, the Space Shuttle and the Apollo spacecraft. Orbital architecture usually addresses the condition of weightlessness, a lack of atmospheric and magnetospheric protection from solar and cosmic radiation, rapid day/night cycles, and possibly risk of orbital debris collision. In addition, re-entry vehicles must also be adapted both to weightlessness and to the high temperatures and accelerations experienced during atmospheric reentry. The coming of the space station would bring effective life support systems with waste management and water reclamation technologies.

==== International Space Station ====
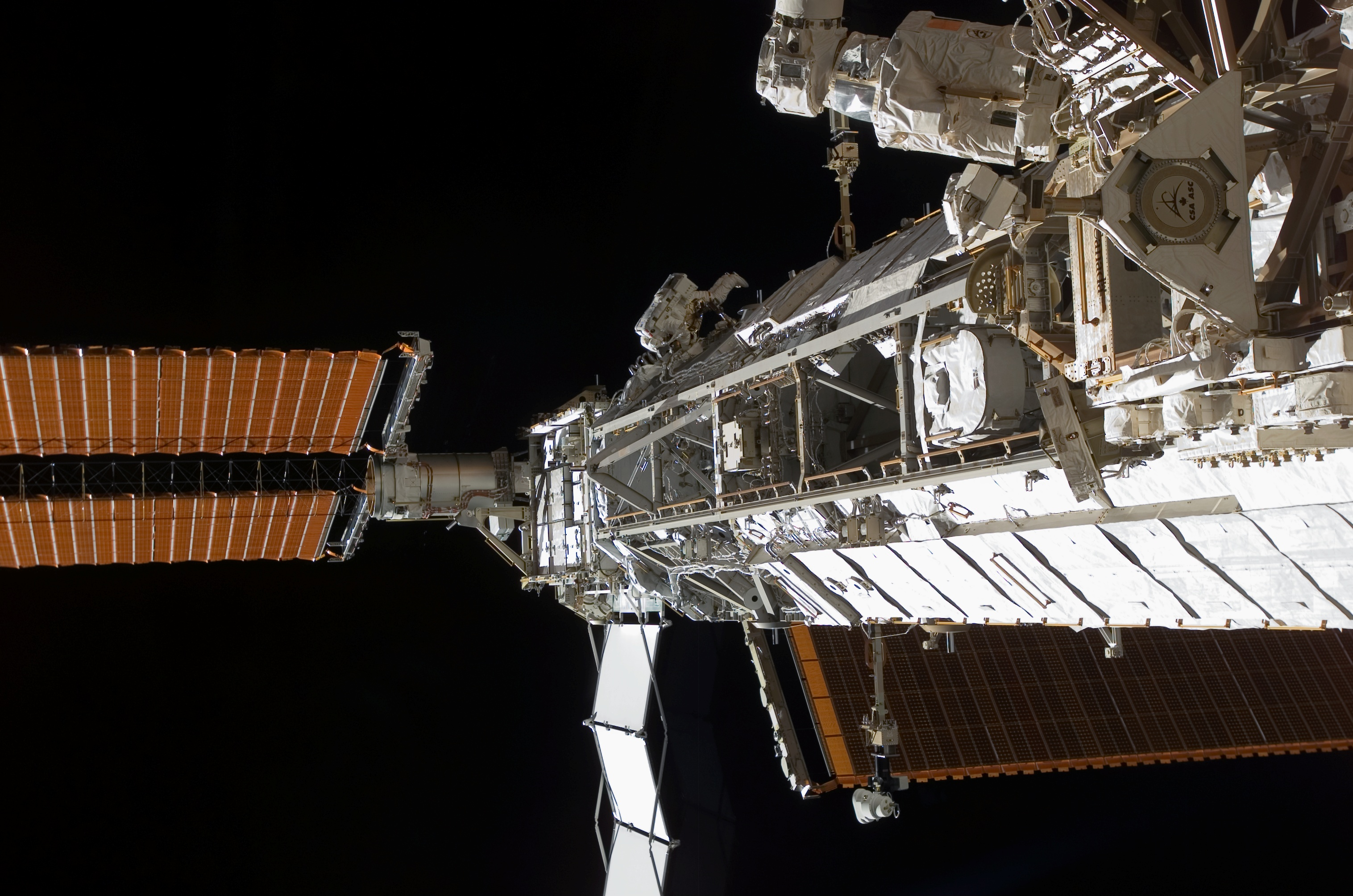
Astronaut (upper center) works on the Integrated Truss Structure of the ISS

The International Space Station (ISS) is the size of an American football field and has a crew of six. With a living volume of 358 m³, it has more interior room than the cargo beds of two American 18-wheeler trucks. However, because of the microgravity environment of the space station, there are not always well-defined walls, floors, and ceilings and all pressurized areas can be used as living and working space. The International Space Station is still under construction. Modules were primarily launched using the Space Shuttle until its deactivation and were assembled by its crew with the help of the working crew on board the space station. ISS modules were often designed and built to barely fit inside the shuttle's payload bay, which is cylindrical with a 4.6 meter diameter.

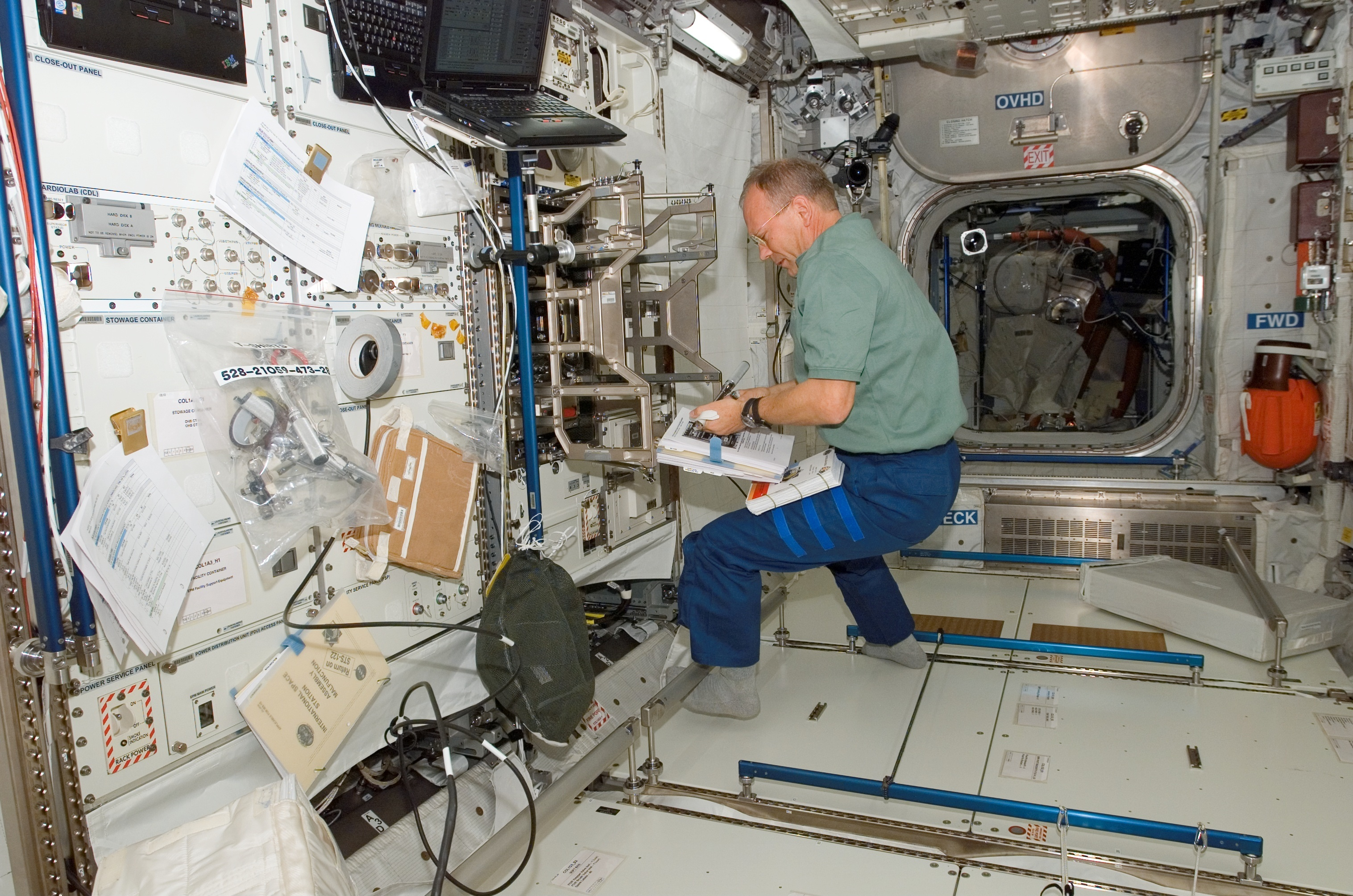
An interior view of the Columbus module

Life aboard the space station is distinct from terrestrial life in some very interesting ways. Astronauts commonly "float" objects to one another; for example they will give a clipboard an initial nudge and it will coast to its receiver across the room. In fact, an astronaut can become so accustomed to this habit that they forget that it doesn't work anymore when they return to Earth. The diet of ISS spacefarers is a combination of participating nations' space food. Each astronaut selects a personalized menu before flight. Many food choices reflect the cultural differences of the astronauts, such as bacon and eggs vs. fish products for breakfast (for the United States and Russia, respectively). More recently such delicacies as Japanense beef curry, kimchi, and swordfish (Riviera style) have been featured on the orbiting outpost. As much of ISS food is dehydrated or sealed in pouches MRE-style, astronauts are quite excited to get relatively fresh food from shuttle and Progress resupply missions. Food is stored in packages that facilitate eating in microgravity by keeping the food constrained to the table. Spent packaging and trash must be collected to load into an available spacecraft for disposal. Waste management is not nearly as straight forward as it is on Earth. The ISS has many windows for observing Earth and space, one of the astronauts' favorite leisure activities. Since the Sun rises every 90 minutes, the windows are covered at "night" to help maintain the 24-hour sleep cycle.

When a shuttle is operating in low Earth orbit, the ISS serves as a safety refuge in case of emergency. ISS astronauts operate with the mindset that they may be called upon to give sanctuary to a Shuttle crew should something happen to compromise a mission. The inability to fall back on the safety of the ISS during the latest Hubble Space Telescope Servicing Mission (because of different orbital inclinations) was the reason a backup shuttle was summoned to the launch pad. The International Space Station is a cooperative project between many nations. The prevailing atmosphere on board is one of diversity and tolerance. This does not mean that it is perfectly harmonious. Astronauts experience the same frustrations and interpersonal quarrels as their Earth-based counterparts.

A typical day on the station might start with wakeup at 6:00 am inside a private soundproof booth in the crew quarters. Astronauts would probably find their sleeping bags in an upright position tied to the wall, because orientation does not matter in space. The astronaut's thighs would be lifted about 50 degrees off the vertical. This is the neutral body posture in weightlessness – it would be excessively tiring to "sit" or "stand" as is common on Earth. Crawling out of their booth, an astronaut may chat with other astronauts about the day's science experiments, mission control conferences, interviews with Earthlings, and perhaps even a space walk or space shuttle arrival.

==== Bigelow Aerospace ====
Bigelow Aerospace took the unique step in securing two patents NASA held from development of the Transhab concept in regard to inflatable space structures. The company now has sole rights to commercial development of the inflatable module technology. On July 12, 2006, the Genesis I experimental space habitat was launched into low Earth orbit. Genesis I demonstrated the basic viability of inflatable space structures, even carrying a payload of life science experiments. The second module, Genesis II, was launched into orbit on June 28, 2007, and tested out several improvements over its predecessor. Among these are reaction wheel assemblies, a precision measurement system for guidance, nine additional cameras, improved gas control for module inflation, and an improved on-board sensor suite.

While Bigelow architecture is still modular, the inflatable configuration allows for much more interior volume than rigid modules. The BA-330, Bigelow's full-scale production model, has more than twice the volume of the largest module on the ISS. Inflatable modules can be docked to rigid modules and are especially well suited for crew living and working quarters. In 2009 NASA began considering attaching a Bigelow module to the ISS, after abandoning the Transhab concept more than a decade before. The modules will likely have a solid inner core for structural support. Surrounding usable space could be partitioned into different rooms and floors. The Bigelow Expandable Activity Module (BEAM) was transported to ISS arriving on April 10, 2016, inside the unpressurized cargo trunk of a SpaceX Dragon during the SpaceX CRS-8 cargo mission.

Bigelow Aerospace may choose to launch many of their modules independently, leasing their use to a wide variety of companies, organizations, and countries that can't afford their own space programs. Possible uses of this space include microgravity research and space manufacturing. Or we may see a private space hotel composed of numerous Bigelow modules for rooms, observatories, or even a recreational padded gymnasium. There is the option of using such modules for habitation quarters on long-term space missions in the Solar System. One amazing aspect of spaceflight is that once a craft leaves an atmosphere, aerodynamic shape is a non-issue. For instance it's possible to apply a Trans Lunar Injection to an entire space station and send it to fly by the Moon. Bigelow has expressed the possibility of their modules being modified for lunar and Martian surface systems as well. However, it is out of business since March 2020.

=== Lunar ===
Lunar architecture exists both in theory and in practice. The Apollo Lunar Module descent stages are the only example of a system that has been used for such an endeavor. The leading hypothesis on the origin of the Moon did not gain its current status until after lunar rock samples were analyzed. The Moon still remains the furthest any human has ever ventured from their home.

==== Apollo ====
Apollo 17 Lunar Module ascent stage blasts off the Moon in 1972, leaving the descent stage behind. View from TV camera on Lunar rover.

On the cruise to the Moon, Apollo astronauts had two "rooms" to choose from – the Command Module (CM) or the Lunar Module (LM). Passage between the two modules was possible through a pressurized docking tunnel. The Command Module featured five windows made of three thick panes of glass. The two inner panes, made of aluminosilicate, ensured no cabin air leaked into space. The outer pane served as a debris shield and part of the heat shield needed for atmospheric reentry. The CM was a sophisticated spacecraft with all the systems required for successful flight but with an interior volume of 6.17 m^{3} could be considered cramped for three astronauts. Another one of its design weaknesses was not possessing a space toilet.

The Lunar Module had two stages. A pressurized upper stage, termed the ascent stage, was the first true spaceship as it could only operate in the vacuum of space. The descent stage carried the engine used for descent, landing gear and radar, fuel and consumables, the famous ladder, and the Lunar Roving Vehicle during later Apollo missions. The idea behind staging is to reduce mass later in a flight, and is the same strategy used in an Earth-launched multistage rocket. The LM pilot stood up during the descent to the Moon. Landing was achieved via automated control with a manual backup mode. There was no airlock on the LM so the entire cabin had to be evacuated (air vented to space) in order to send an astronaut out to walk on the surface. To stay alive, both astronauts in the LM would have to get in their space suits at this point. The Lunar Module worked well for what it was designed to do. However, a big unknown remained throughout the design process – the effects of lunar dust.

Every astronaut who walked on the Moon tracked in lunar dust, contaminating the LM and later the CM during Lunar Orbit Rendezvous. These dust particles can't be brushed away in a vacuum, and have been described by John Young of Apollo 16 as being like tiny razor blades. It was soon realized that for humans to live on the Moon, dust mitigation was one of many issues that had to be taken seriously.

==== Constellation program ====
The Exploration Systems Architecture Study that followed the Vision for Space Exploration of 2004 recommended the development of a new class of vehicles that have similar capabilities to their Apollo predecessors with several key differences. In part to retain some of the Space Shuttle program workforce and ground infrastructure, the launch vehicles were to use Shuttle-derived technologies. Secondly, rather than launching the crew and cargo on the same rocket, the smaller Ares I was to launch the crew with the larger Ares V to handle the heavier cargo. The two payloads were to rendezvous in low Earth orbit and then head to the Moon from there. The Apollo Lunar Module could not carry enough fuel to reach the polar regions of the Moon but the Altair lunar lander was intended to access any part of the Moon. While the Altair and surface systems would have been equally necessary for Constellation program to reach fruition, the focus was on developing the Orion spacecraft to shorten the gap in U.S. access to orbit following the retirement of the Space Shuttle in 2010.

Even NASA has described Constellation architecture as 'Apollo on steroids'. Nonetheless, a return to the proven capsule design was a move welcomed by many.

=== Martian ===
Martian architecture is architecture designed to sustain human life on the surface of Mars, and all the supporting systems necessary to make this possible. The direct sampling of water ice on the surface, and evidence for geyser-like water flows within the last decade, have made Mars the most likely extraterrestrial environment for finding liquid water, and therefore alien life, in the Solar System. Moreover, some geologic evidence suggests that Mars could have been warm and wet on a global scale in its distant past. Intense geologic activity has reshaped the surface of the Earth, erasing evidence of our earliest history. Martian rocks can be even older than Earth rocks, though, so exploring Mars may help us decipher the story of our own geologic evolution including the origin of life on Earth. Mars has an atmosphere, though its surface pressure is less than 1% of Earth's. Its surface gravity is about 38% of Earth's. Although a human expedition to Mars has not yet taken place, there has been significant work on Martian habitat design. Martian architecture would usually fall into one of two categories: architecture imported from Earth fully assembled and architecture making use of local resources.

==== Von Braun and other early proposals ====
Wernher von Braun was the first to come up with a technically comprehensive proposal for a crewed Mars expedition. Rather than a minimal mission profile like Apollo, von Braun envisioned a crew of 70 astronauts aboard a fleet of ten massive spacecraft. Each vessel would be constructed in low Earth orbit, requiring nearly 100 separate launches before one was fully assembled. Seven of the spacecraft would be for crew while three were designated as cargo ships. There were even designs for small "boats" to shuttle crew and supplies between ships during the cruise to the Red Planet, which was to follow a minimum-energy Hohmann transfer trajectory. This mission plan would involve one-way transit times on the order of eight months and a long stay at Mars, creating the need for long-term living accommodations in space. Upon arrival at the Red Planet, the fleet would brake into Mars orbit and would remain there until the seven human vessels were ready to return to Earth. Only landing gliders, which were stored in the cargo ships, and their associated ascent stages would travel to the surface. Inflatable habitats would be constructed on the surface along with a landing strip to facilitate further glider landings. All necessary propellant and consumables were to be brought from Earth in von Braun's proposal. Some crew remained in the passenger ships during the mission for orbit-based observation of Mars and to maintain the ships. The passenger ships had habitation spheres 20 meters in diameter. Because the average crew member would spend much time in these ships (around 16 months of transit plus rotating shifts in Mars orbit), habitat design for the ships was an integral part of this mission.

Von Braun was aware of the threat posed by extended exposure to weightlessness. He suggested either tethering passenger ships together to spin about a common center of mass or including self-rotating, dumbbell-shaped "gravity cells" to drift alongside the flotilla to provide each crew member with a few hours of artificial gravity each day. At the time of von Braun's proposal, little was known of the dangers of solar radiation beyond Earth and it was cosmic radiation that was thought to present the more formidable challenge. The discovery of the Van Allen belts in 1958 demonstrated that the Earth was shielded from high energy solar particles. For the surface portion of the mission, inflatable habitats suggest the desire to maximize living space. It is clear von Braun considered the members of the expedition part of a community with much traffic and interaction between vessels.

The Soviet Union conducted studies of human exploration of Mars and came up with slightly less epic mission designs (though not short on exotic technologies) in 1960 and 1969. The first of which used electric propulsion for interplanetary transit and nuclear reactors as the power plants. On spacecraft that combine human crew and nuclear reactors, the reactor is usually placed at a maximum distance from the crew quarters, often at the end of a long pole, for radiation safety. An interesting component of the 1960 mission was the surface architecture. A "train" with wheels for rough terrain was to be assembled of landed research modules, one of which was a crew cabin. The train was to traverse the surface of Mars from south pole to north pole, an extremely ambitious goal even by today's standards. Other Soviet plans such as the TMK eschewed the large costs associated with landing on the Martian surface and advocated piloted (crewed) flybys of Mars. Flyby missions, like the lunar Apollo 8, extend the human presence to other worlds with less risk than landings. Most early Soviet proposals called for launches using the ill-fated N1 rocket. They also usually involved fewer crew than their American counterparts. Early Martian architecture concepts generally featured assembly in low Earth orbit, bringing all needed consumables from Earth, and designated work vs. living areas. The modern outlook on Mars exploration is not the same.

==== Recent initiatives ====
In every serious study of what it would take to land humans on Mars, keep them alive, and then return them to Earth, the total mass required for the mission is simply stunning. The problem lies in that to launch the amount of consumables (oxygen, food and water) even a small crew would go through during a multi-year Mars mission, it would take a very large rocket with the vast majority of its own mass being propellant. This is where multiple launches and assembly in Earth orbit come from. However even if such a ship stocked full of goods could be put together in orbit, it would need an additional (large) supply of propellant to send it to Mars. The delta-v, or change in velocity, required to insert a spacecraft from Earth orbit to a Mars transfer orbit is many kilometers per second. When we think of getting astronauts to the surface of Mars and back home we quickly realize that an enormous amount of propellant is needed if everything is taken from the Earth. This was the conclusion reached in the 1989 '90-Day Study' initiated by NASA in response to the Space Exploration Initiative.

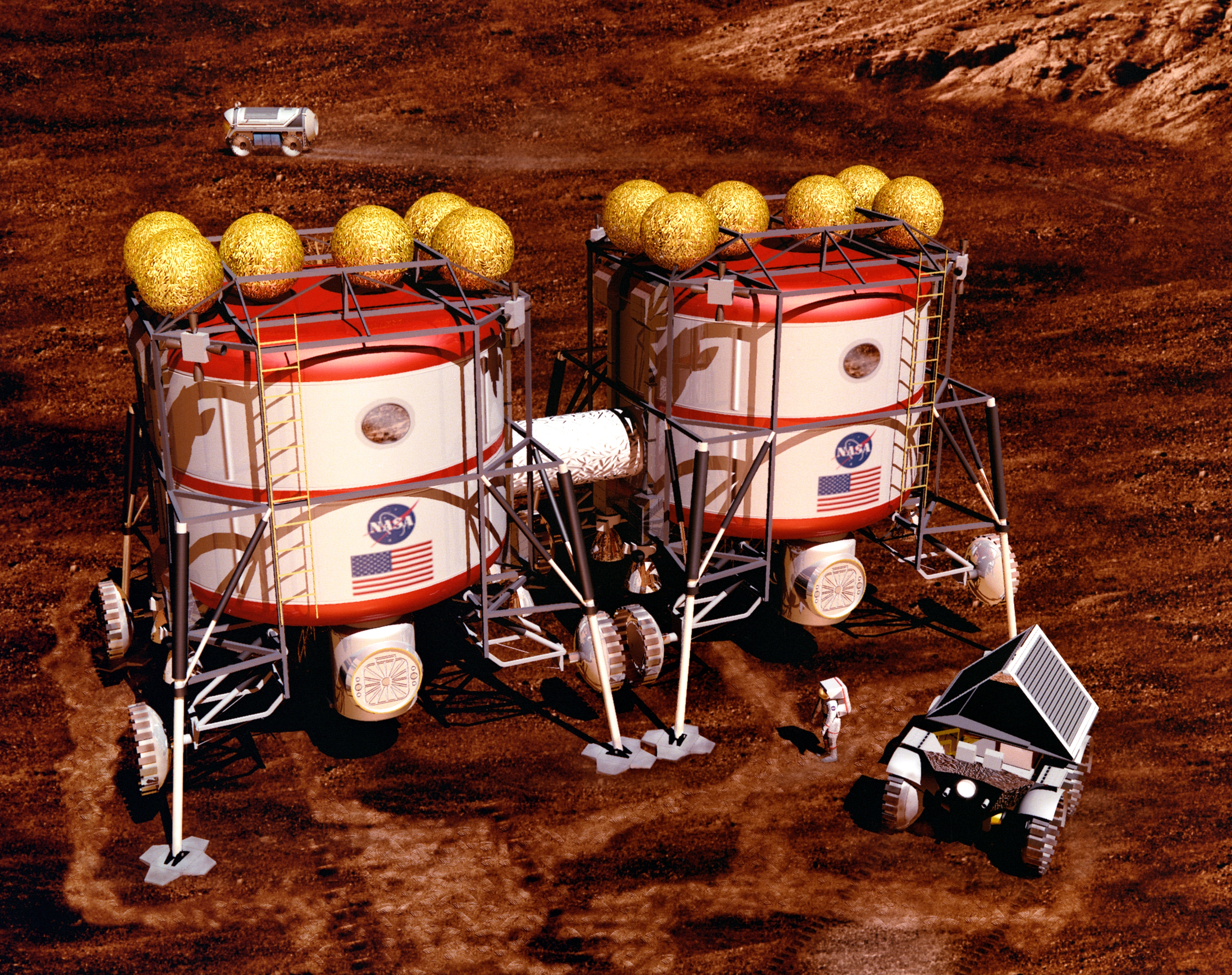
The NASA Design Reference Mission 3.0 incorporated many concepts from the Mars Direct proposal

Several techniques have changed the outlook on Mars exploration. The most powerful of which is in-situ resource utilization. Using hydrogen imported from Earth and carbon dioxide from the Martian atmosphere, the Sabatier reaction can be used to manufacture methane (for rocket propellant) and water (for drinking and for oxygen production through electrolysis). Another technique to reduce Earth-brought propellant requirements is aerobraking. Aerobraking involves skimming the upper layers of an atmosphere, over many passes, to slow a spacecraft down. It's a time-intensive process that shows most promise in slowing down cargo shipments of food and supplies. NASA's Constellation program does call for landing humans on Mars after a permanent base on the Moon is demonstrated, but details of the base architecture are far from established. It is likely that the first permanent settlement will consist of consecutive crews landing prefabricated habitat modules in the same location and linking them together to form a base.

In some of these modern, economy models of the Mars mission, we see the crew size reduced to a minimal 4 or 6. Such a loss in variety of social relationships can lead to challenges in forming balanced social responses and forming a complete sense of identity. It follows that if long-duration missions are to be carried out with very small crews, then intelligent selection of crew is of primary importance. Role assignments is another open issue in Mars mission planning. The primary role of 'pilot' is obsolete when landing takes only a few minutes of a mission lasting hundreds of days, and when that landing will be automated anyway. Assignment of roles will depend heavily on the work to be done on the surface and will require astronauts to assume multiple responsibilities. As for surface architecture inflatable habitats, perhaps even provided by Bigelow Aerospace, remain a possible option for maximizing living space. In later missions, bricks could be made from a Martian regolith mixture for shielding or even primary, airtight structural components. The environment on Mars offers different opportunities for space suit design, even something like the skin-tight Bio-Suit.

A number of specific habitat design proposals have been put forward, to varying degrees of architectural and engineering analysis. One recent proposal—and the winner of NASA's 2015 Mars Habitat Competition—is Mars Ice House. The design concept is for a Mars surface habitat, 3d-printed in layers out of water ice on the interior of an Earth-manufactured inflatable pressure-retention membrane. The completed structure would be semi-transparent, absorbing harmful radiation in several wavelengths, while admitting approximately 50 percent of light in the visible spectrum. The habitat is proposed to be entirely set up and built from an autonomous robotic spacecraft and bots, although human habitation with approximately 2–4 inhabitants is envisioned once the habitat is fully built and tested.

=== Suborbital ===
Structures that cross the boundary of space but do not reach orbital speeds are considered suborbital architecture. For spaceplanes, the architecture has much in common with airliner architecture, especially those of small business jets.

==== SpaceShip ====
A mockup of the SpaceShipTwo interior

On June 21, 2004 Mike Melvill reached space funded entirely by private means for the Ansari X prize. The vehicle, SpaceShipOne, was developed by Scaled Composites as an precursor to a privately operated fleet of spaceplanes for suborbital space tourism. Because SS1 is not designed to go into orbit around the Earth, it is an example of suborbital or aerospace architecture.

The architecture of the succeeding SpaceShipTwo vehicle is somewhat different from what is common in previous space vehicles. Unlike the cluttered interiors with protruding machinery and many switches of previous vehicles, SS2 has adopted a more conformal interior design. Both SS2 and the White Knight Two carrier aircraft are being built from lightweight composite materials instead of metal. Upon reaching Space, the rocket motor will be turned off, ending the noise and vibration whereupon passengers would be able to experience weightlessness. Numerous double-paned windows that encircle the cabin offer them views in nearly all directions. Cushioned seats will recline flat into the floor to maximize room for floating.

=== Autonomous ===
Autonomous space architecture refers to the design and realization of large-scale space structures using robotic systems, modular components, and distributed control. It had been developed as part of space systems engineering to enable autonomous in-space assembly. Different constraints namely limited launch mass, remote operations and prolonged missions have been addressed in this architectural setup. It also integrates advances in robotics, structural engineering, and computational planning

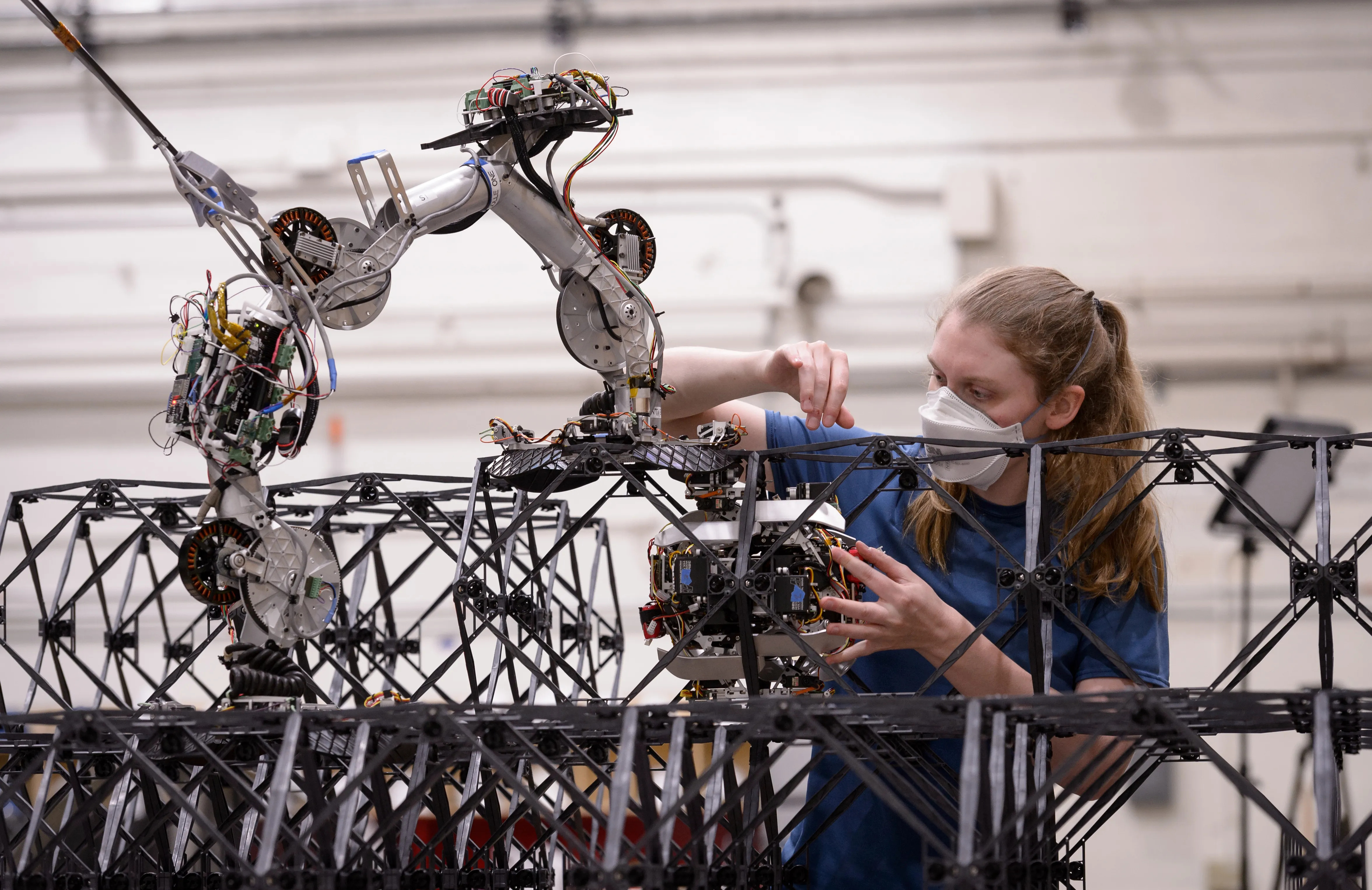
Assembly of large scale truss with MMIC-I at NASA

==== Robotic assembly ====
From the 1990s to the early 2000s, NASA demonstrated automated assembly technologies, including machine vision-based control and monitoring systems for constructing truss structures, as well as robotic methods for assembling large truss structures, through ground experiments.

In 2003, researchers at the University of Southern California explored distributed and modular approaches to assembling space structures, and also conducted research on distributed collaboration and reconfigurable assembly systems.

Robots working autonomously as a team, to assemble a meters-scale shelter structure using hundreds of building blocks at Ames Research Center

In 2019, the Massachusetts Institute of Technology (MIT) and NASA Ames Research Center studied and validated a modular construction system that uses algorithms and semi-autonomous processes to iteratively assemble elements for building large scale structures with reconfigurable structural architectures. The MOSAR project, funded by the EU's Horizon 2020 program, involves a repositionable symmetrical walking robotic manipulator that can capture, manipulate, and position modules, and simultaneously reposition directly onto modules of space structures.

==== Structural self-assembly ====
In 2003, ISAS proposed a conceptual approach to assembly based on local interactions between autonomous modules without centralized control.

At the Aurelia Institute of MIT since 2017, TESSERAE, a tessellation-type electromagnetic and self-organizing space architecture, has been researched and developed. It is aimed at exploring reconfigurable and highly adaptable environments. In March 2020, TESSERAE v3 hardware tiles were delivered to the International Space Station by SpaceX (CRS-20) for a 30-day mission. In 2022, a prototype launched on Axiom Space's Axiom Mission 1 demonstrated a module equipped with extensive sensing and electromagnetic permanent magnet arrays for monitoring diagnostic information, understanding the coupling state between tiles, and controlling shape.

== Robotic ==
It is widely accepted that robotic reconnaissance and trail-blazer missions will precede human exploration of other worlds. Making an informed decision on which specific destinations warrant sending human explorers requires more data than what the best Earth-based telescopes can provide. For example, landing site selection for the Apollo Moon landings drew on data from three different robotic programs: the Ranger program, the Lunar Orbiter program, and the Surveyor program. Before a human was sent, robotic spacecraft mapped the lunar surface, proved the feasibility of soft landings, filmed the terrain up close with television cameras, and scooped and analysed the soil.

A robotic exploration mission is generally designed to carry a wide variety of scientific instruments, ranging from cameras sensitive to particular wavelengths, telescopes, spectrometers, radar devices, accelerometers, radiometers, and particle detectors. The function of these instruments is usually to return scientific data but it can also be to give an intuitive "feel" of the state of the spacecraft, allowing a subconscious familiarization with the territory being explored, through telepresence.

The modern, balanced approach to exploring an extraterrestrial destination involves several phases of exploration, each of which needs to produce rationale for progressing to the next phase. The phase immediately preceding human exploration can be described as anthropocentric sensing, that is, sensing designed to give humans as realistic a feeling as possible of actually exploring in person. More, the line between a human system and a robotic system in space is not always going to be clear. As a general rule, the more formidable the environment, the more essential robotic technology is. Robotic systems can be broadly considered part of space architecture when their purpose is to facilitate the habitation of space or extend the range of the physiological senses into space.

== Future ==
The future of space architecture hinges on the expansion of human presence in space. Under the historical model of government-orchestrated exploration missions initiated by single political administrations, space structures are likely to be limited to small-scale habitats and orbital modules with design life cycles of only several years or decades. The designs, and thus architecture, will generally be fixed and without real time feedback from the spacefarers themselves. The technology to repair and upgrade existing habitats, a practice widespread on Earth, is not likely to be developed under short term exploration goals. If exploration takes on a multi-administration or international character, the prospects for space architecture development by the inhabitants themselves will be broader. Private space tourism is a way the development of space and a space transportation infrastructure can be accelerated. Virgin Galactic has indicated plans for an orbital craft, SpaceShipThree. The demand for space tourism is one without bound. Another impetus to become a spacefaring species is planetary defense.

The classic space mission is the Earth-colliding asteroid interception mission. Using nuclear detonations to split or deflect the asteroid is risky at best. Such a tactic could actually make the problem worse by increasing the amount of asteroid fragments that do end up hitting the Earth. Robert Zubrin writes:

If bombs are to be used as asteroid deflectors, they cannot just be launched willy-nilly. No, before any bombs are detonated, the asteroid will have to be thoroughly explored, its geology assessed, and subsurface bomb placements carefully determined and precisely located on the basis of such knowledge. A human crew, consisting of surveyors, geologists, miners, drillers, and demolition experts, will be needed on the scene to do the job right.

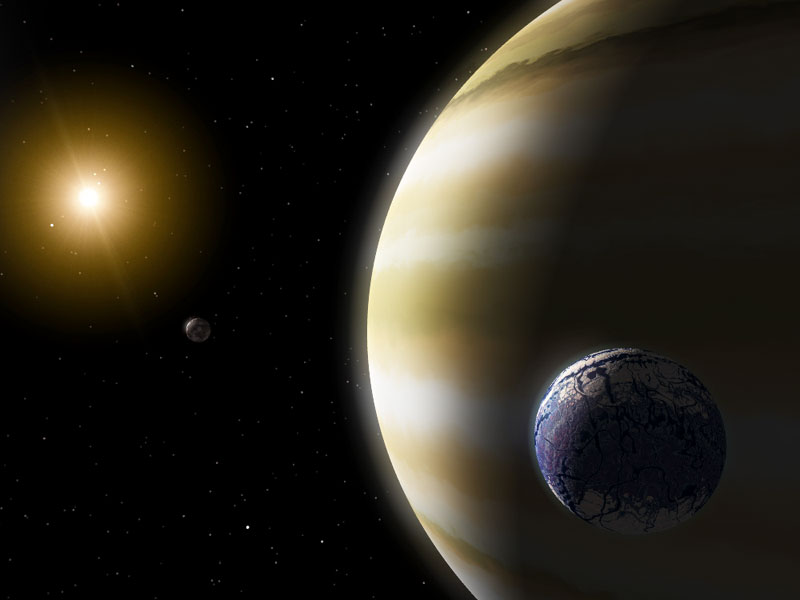
Robotic probes have explored much of the Solar System but humans have not yet left the Earth's influence

If such a crew is to be summoned to a distant asteroid, there may be less risky ways to divert the asteroid. Another promising asteroid mitigation strategy is to land a crew on the asteroid well ahead of its impact date and to begin diverting some its mass into space to slowly alter its trajectory. This is a form of rocket propulsion by virtue of Newton's third law with the asteroid's mass as the propellant. Whether exploding nuclear weapons or diversion of mass is used, a sizable human crew may need to be sent into space for many months if not years to accomplish this mission. Questions such as what the astronauts will live in and what the ship will be like are questions for the space architect.

When motivations to go into space are realized, work on mitigating the most serious threats can begin. One of the biggest threats to astronaut safety in space is sudden radiation events from solar flares. The violent solar storm of August 1972, which occurred between the Apollo 16 and Apollo 17 missions, could have produced fatal consequences had astronauts been caught exposed on the lunar surface. The best known protection against radiation in space is shielding; an especially effective shield is water contained in large tanks surrounding the astronauts. Unfortunately water has a mass of 1000 kilograms per cubic meter. A more practical approach would be to construct solar "storm shelters" that spacefarers can retreat to during peak events. For this to work, however, there would need to be a space weather broadcasting system in place to warn astronauts of upcoming storms, much like a tsunami warning system warns coastal inhabitants of impending danger. Perhaps one day a fleet of robotic spacecraft will orbit close to the Sun, monitoring solar activity and sending precious minutes of warning before waves of dangerous particles arrive at inhabited regions of space.

Specialized space-architecture education is currently offered in several institutions. The Sasakawa International Center for Space Architecture (SICSA) is an academic unit within the University of Houston that offers a Master of Science in Space Architecture. SICSA also works on design contracts with corporations and space agencies. In Europe, the Vienna University of Technology (TU Wien) and the International Space University are involved in space architecture research. The TU Wien offers an EMBA in Space Architecture.

== Gallery ==
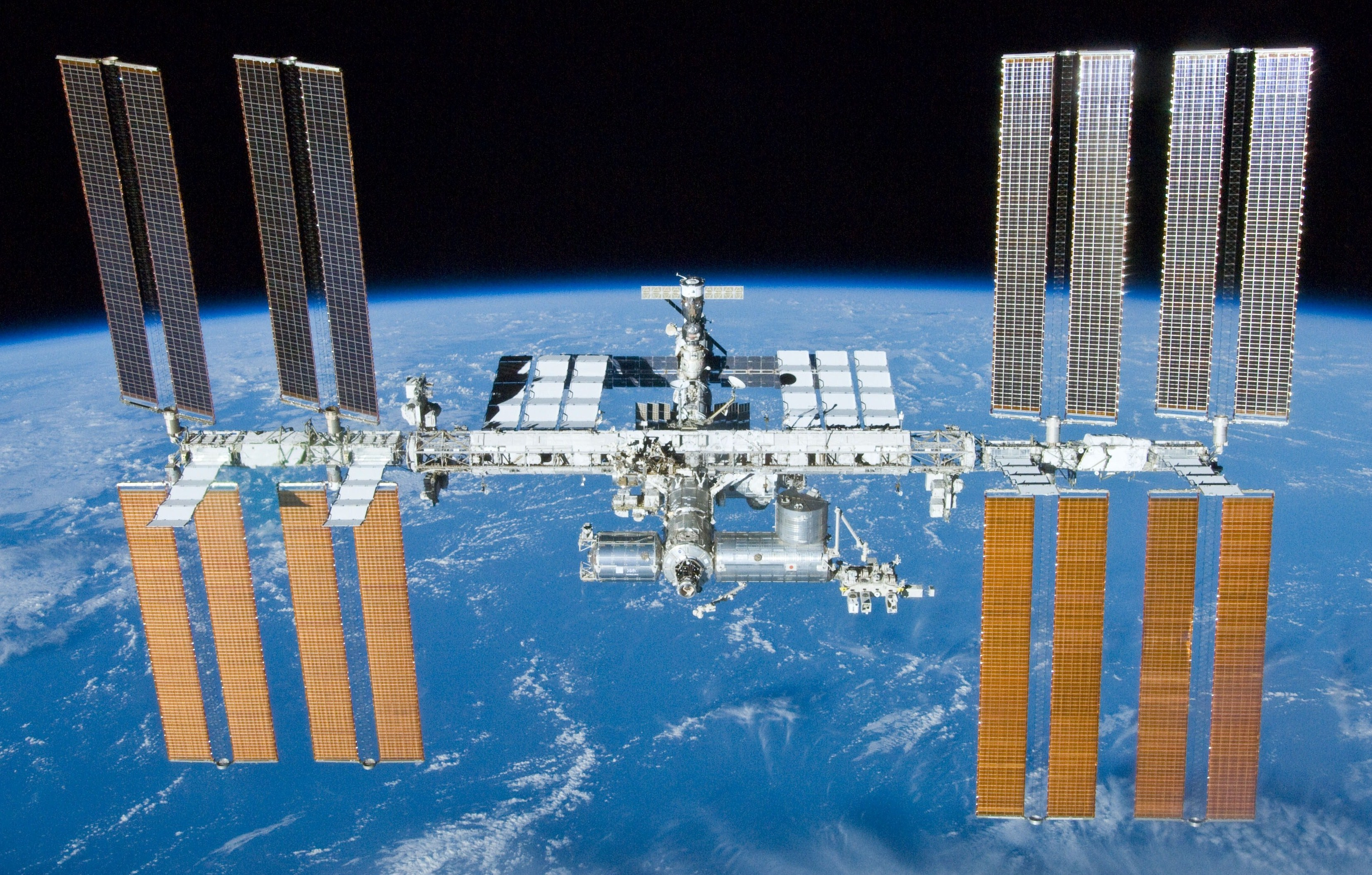
The International Space Station in its 2010 configuration

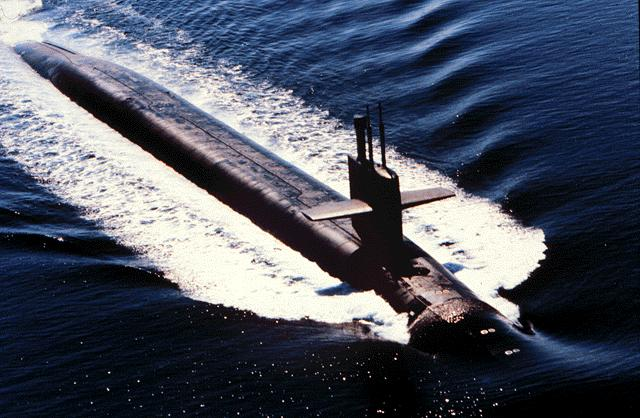
Many life support technologies have been adapted from the submarine.

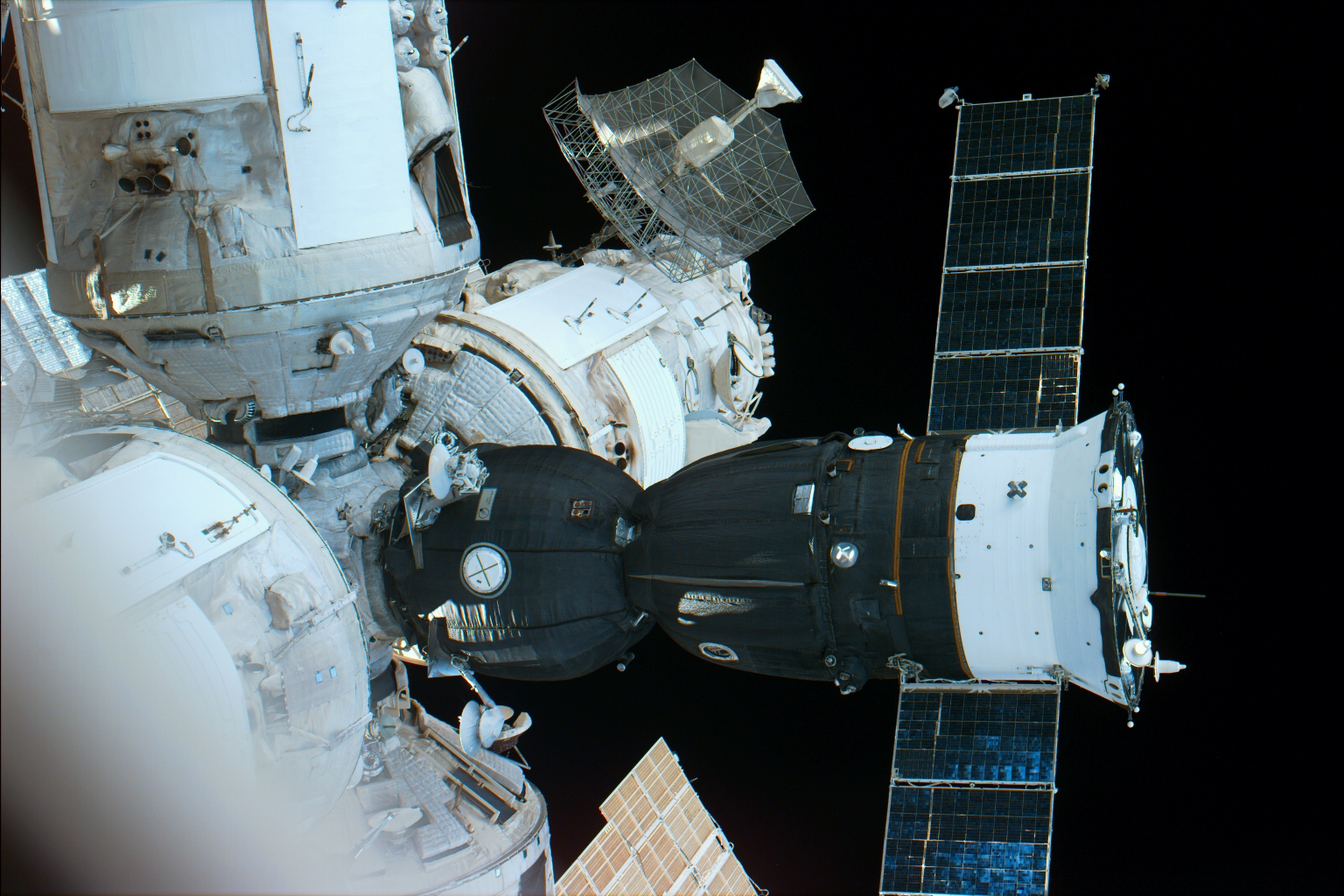
A Soyuz spacecraft docked to the Mir Core Module.

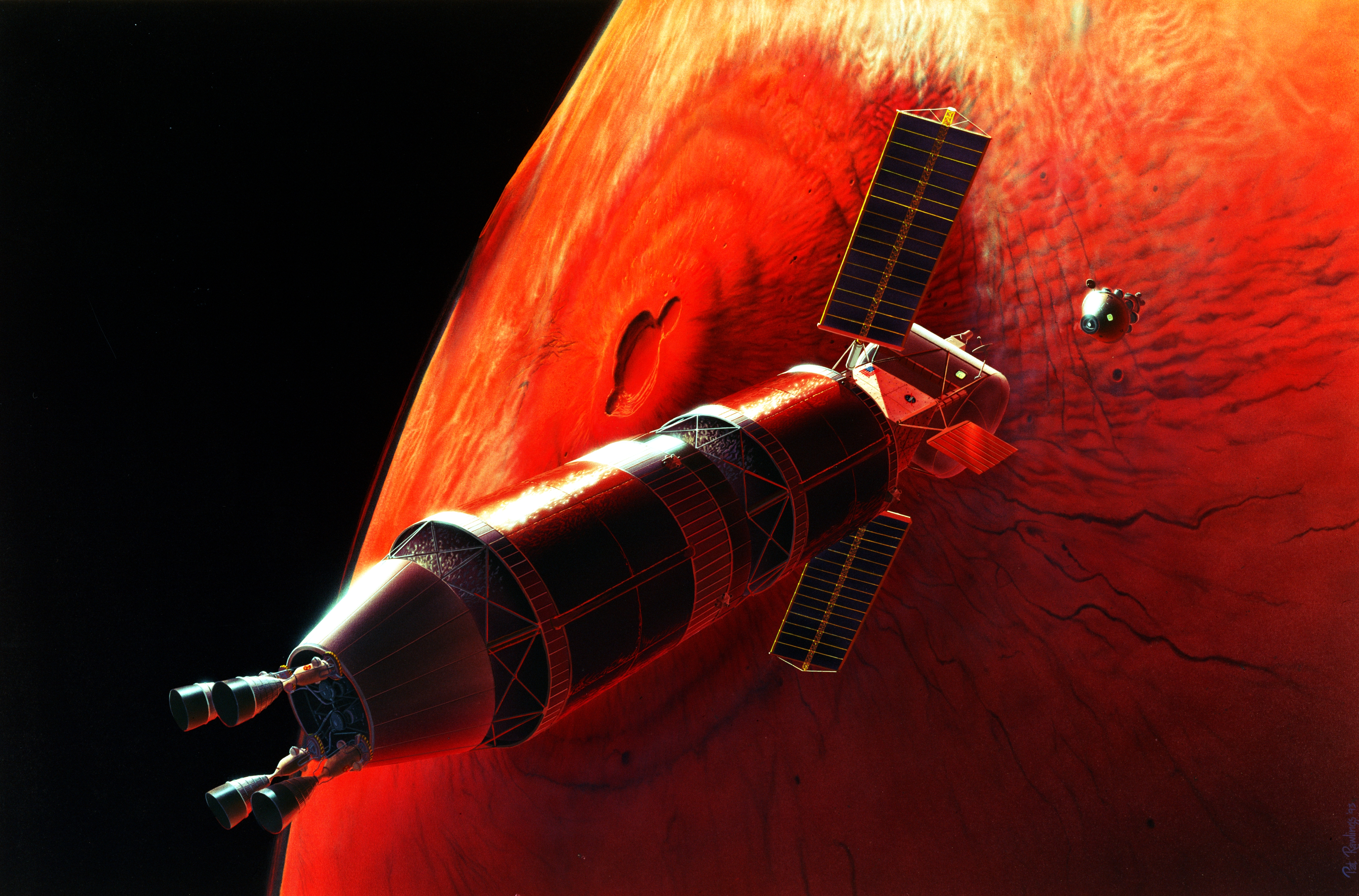
A hypothetical spacecraft performing Mars orbit rendezvous.

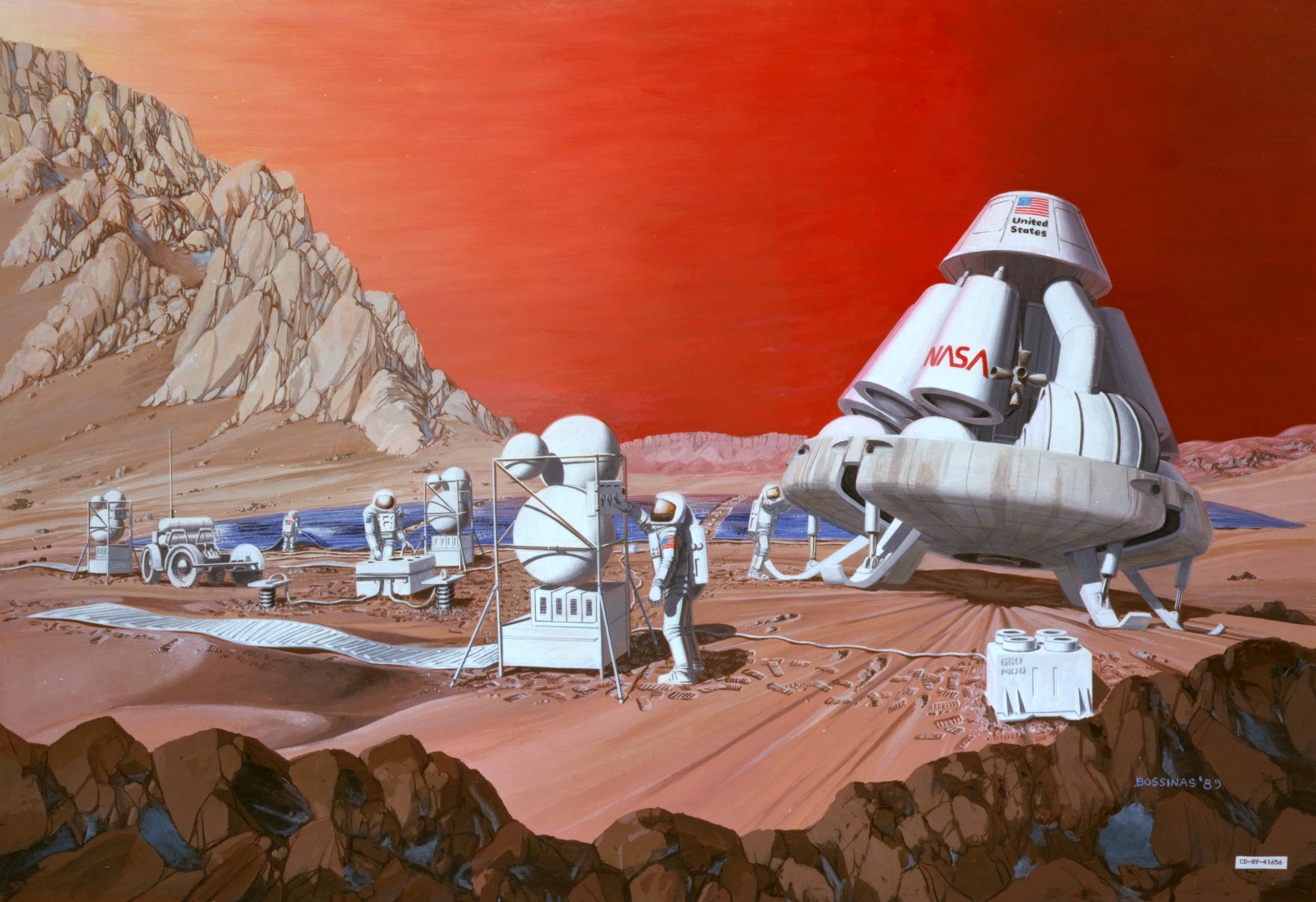
1989 painting of Mars surface operations.

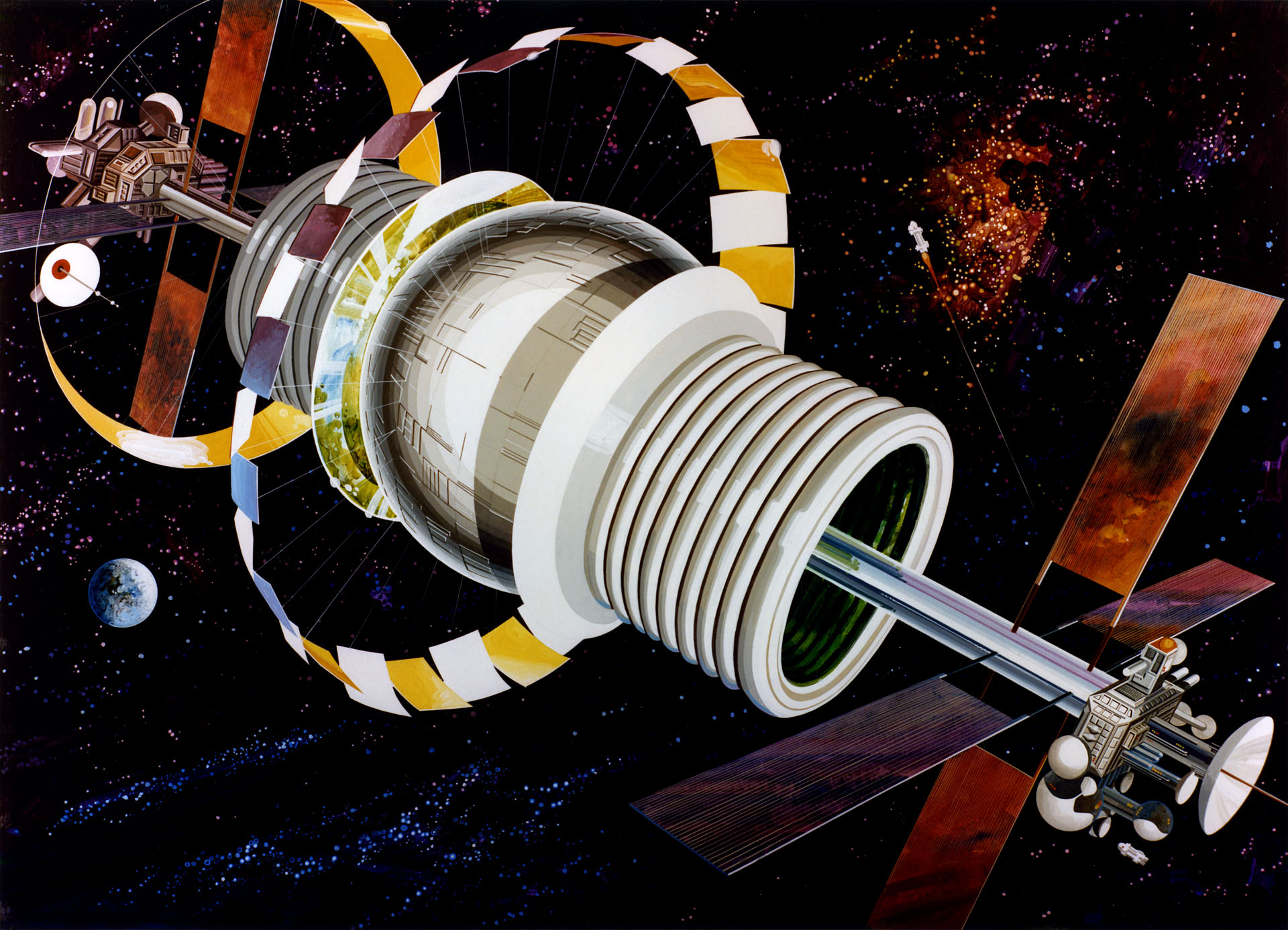
The Bernal sphere is an example of non-modular space architecture.

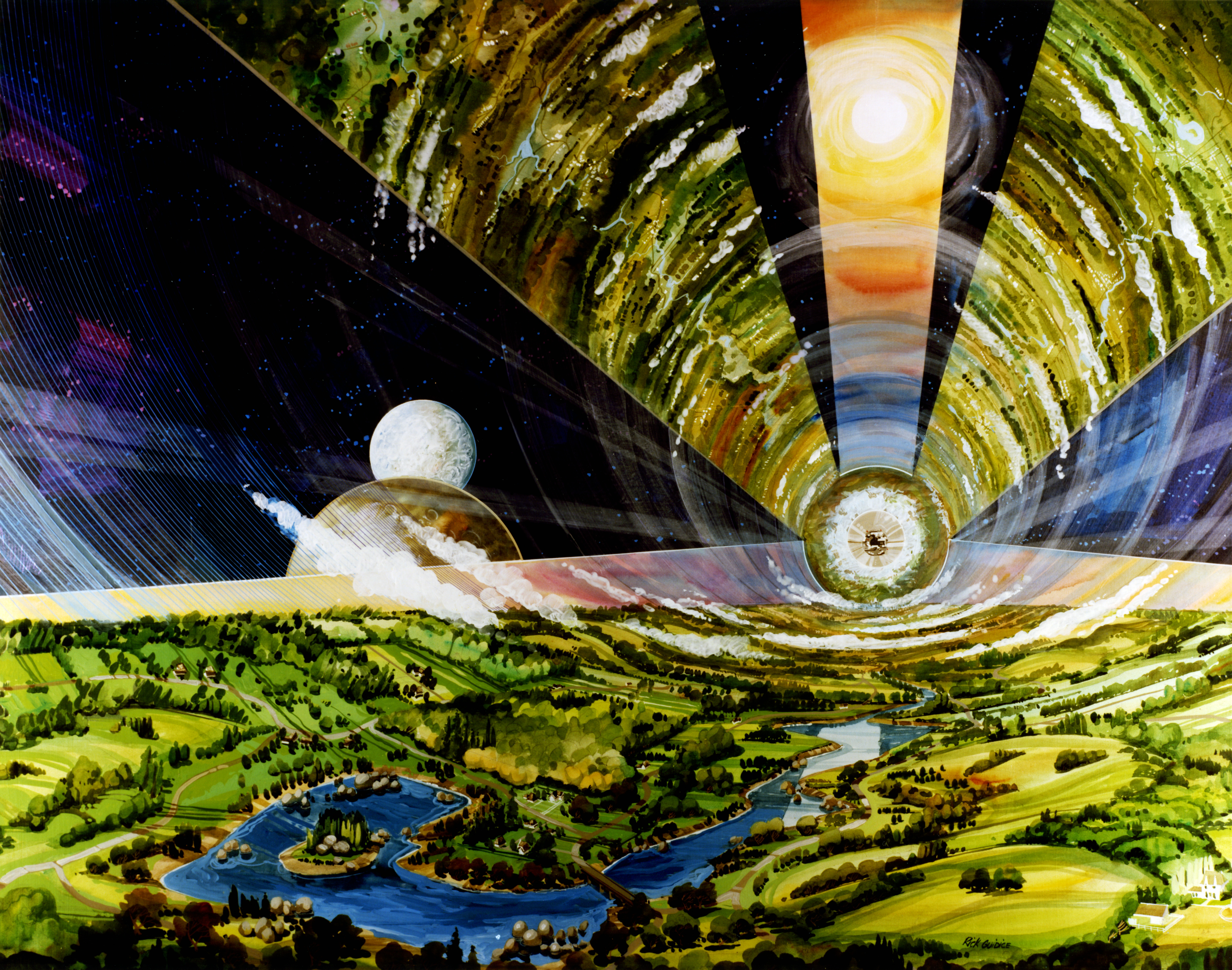
Artificial gravity can be created by spinning a space colony.

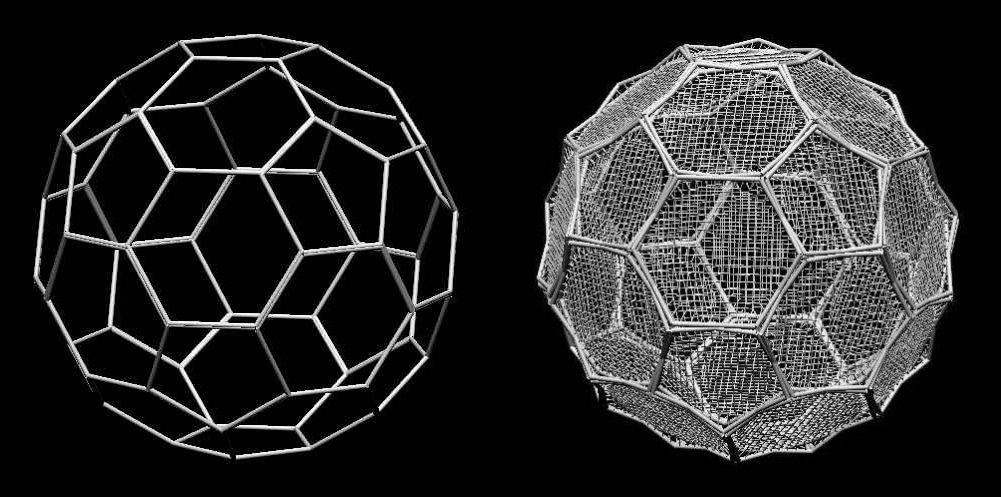
Dyson Sphere is the structure for creating space settlements in space and Dyson spheres around different space objects

== See also ==
- Aerospace architecture – Discipline of architectural design
- Infrastructure – Facilities and systems serving society
- Infrastructure-based development – Development based on long-term infrastructure investments
- Planetary surface construction – Construction of structures on planetary surface
- Research station – Facility for scientific research
- Space colonization – Concept of permanent human habitation outside of Earth
- Shackleton Energy Company – American moon mining company
- Space telescope, also known as Space observatory – Instrument in space to study astronomical objects
- Space tourism – Human space travel for recreation
- Underground construction – Field of engineering for the design and construction of structures below the ground
- Underwater construction – Industrial construction in an underwater environment
