= Ryōichi Sasakawa =

Japanese businessman, politician and philanthropist (1899–1995)

- 笹川 良一
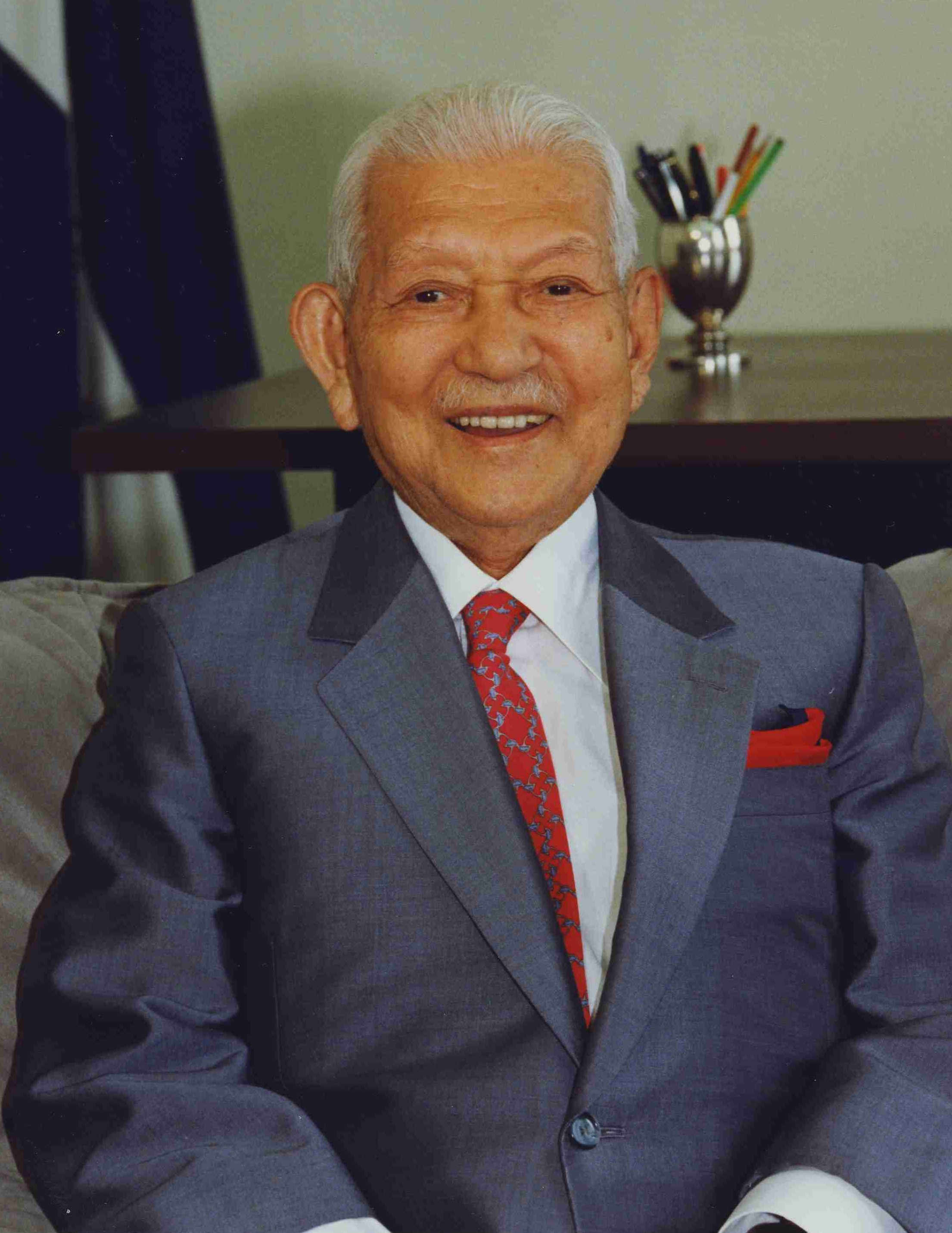
- Sasakawa in 1990

Member of the House of Representatives
- In office 1 May 1942 – c. December 1945
- Preceded by: Man'itsu Tanaka
- Succeeded by: Constituency abolished
- Constituency: Osaka 5th

Personal details
- Born: 4 May 1899 Mishima, Osaka, Japan
- Died: 18 July 1995 (aged 96) Tokyo, Japan
- Children: Takashi Sasagawa; Yōhei Sasakawa
- Relatives: Hiroyoshi Sasagawa (grandson)
- Occupation: Businessman, sports administrator

Ryōichi Sasakawa (笹川 良一, Sasakawa Ryōichi; May 4, 1899 – July 18, 1995) was a Japanese businessman, far-right politician, suspected class A war criminal, and philanthropist.

In the 1930s and during the Second World War, he was active both in finance and in politics, actively supporting the Japanese war effort. He served in the House of Representatives from 1942 to 1945. After Japan's defeat he was accused of war crimes and imprisoned for a time. After his release, he found financial success in various business ventures, including motorboat-racing gambling events (Kyōtei) and ship building. He supported anti-communist activities, including the World Anti-Communist League. In 1962 he founded the Nippon Foundation and became its first chairman. The foundation has done charitable work around the world, for which it and Sasakawa have received many official honors.

== Pre-war political activity ==
In the 1930s, during the Sino-Japanese War, Sasakawa rose to prominence by using wealth gained in rice speculation to build a voluntary flying squad within Japan for the purpose of providing trained pilots in case of a national emergency. He also built an air defense field, donating it to the army. Once Japan began to coordinate its air power in 1941, Sasakawa dissolved his voluntary flying group and gave all of its facilities and aircraft to the nation. In addition, he used the various mining interests that he had accumulated to support the army in a more concrete fashion. Sasakawa was more interested in supporting the war effort than making a profit, with one biographer noting that "his family records show ... that his mining ventures were not as profitable in wartime as they could have been".

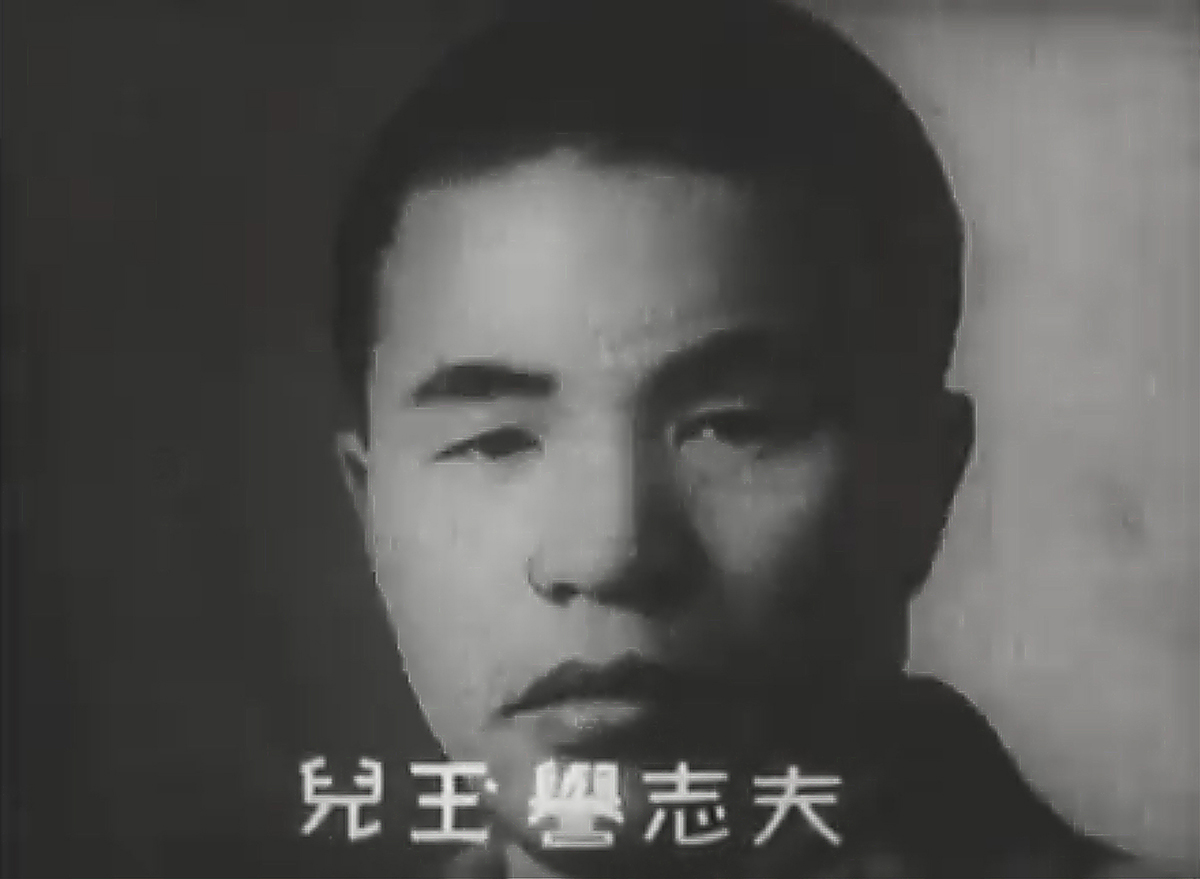
Sasakawa's right wing compatriot ultranationalist, Yoshio Kodama, who late became a prominent figure in post-war Japan's organized crime groups.

The 1930s saw Sasakawa take the helm of the Kokusui Taishu-to, or Patriotic People's Party (PPP). This small organization was one of the many right-wing groups that sprang up in Japan in the lead-up to World War II. It was in this connection that he first met Yoshio Kodama, who was at that time a member. In 1935, Sasakawa and twelve other leading members of the PPP were arrested and held for three years on suspicion of having ordered the blackmail of several leading companies, such as Takashimaya, the Hankyu Railway, and Tokyo Life Insurance. Though he was eventually acquitted, the jail time and the subsequent appeals process took a total of six years, leading up the opening year of World War II. In the end, the prosecution itself revealed that the charges against him had been based more on perception of the PPP as "dangerous", than on actual evidence of blackmail. In 1939, Sasakawa flew his air squadron to Rome to meet his personal hero Benito Mussolini, whom he admired as "the perfect fascist and dictator".

Sasakawa's trials ended in August 1941. In December that year, World War II broke out in the Pacific, and in April 1942, Sasakawa won a seat in the Japanese Diet, taking one of only 85 out of 466 seats that were captured by non-government-backed candidates. The reason that such candidates were so few was that it was wartime, and those in power were doing all they could to control policy while maintaining a mask of parliamentary democracy.

In the Diet, he stood against the government's suppression of the freedom of speech and its pressure for the conformity of all parliamentarians. However, his efforts in this vein were largely unsuccessful, and he spent much of the war outside of the Diet, touring Manchuria and China, visiting prisons around the country, and cheering those on the home front.

== War crime arrest ==
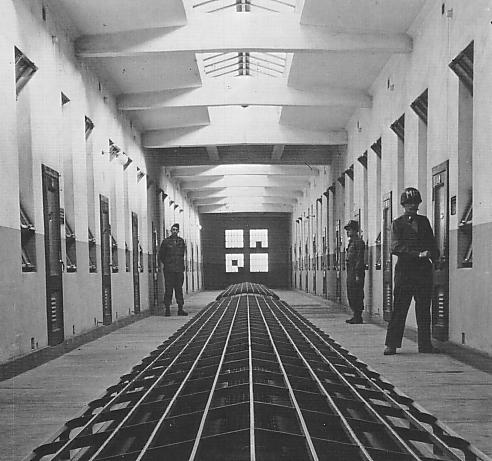
Sugamo prison

At the end of the war, Sasakawa entered the occupation-run Sugamo prison and spent more than three years there as a suspected war criminal. While until a short time before his arrest, there was little possibility of his detainment, much less as a Class A war crimes suspect, from October to November, 1945, he launched a campaign of twenty or so speeches in Osaka, decrying victor's justice and demanding to be taken as a prisoner so that he could help defend Japan in the Tokyo war crimes trials. He was "motivated by a desire to speak out in defense of the emperor and in the interests of Japan at the Tokyo Trials".

The US summary for his arrest, dated December 4, 1945 reads as follows:

Sasakawa should be arrested for the following reasons: first, for leading campaigns instigating aggression, nationalism and hostility against the United States. And second, for his continued vigorous activities in an organization that strongly impedes the development of democracy in Japan.

While in prison, Sasakawa was able to establish connections with many of the men who had led Japan during the war, and who would go on to reassume these roles after their release. He also came into further contact with Yoshio Kodama, though the exact nature of their prison relationship does not seem to have been as positive as it had been when they were both members of the PPP. In prison, Kodama pursued a policy of collaborating with his captors, naming names and making questionable statements that put other prisoners at a disadvantage. As part of this policy, he asked that his testimony about Sasakawa be kept secret, and it would appear that Sasakawa never found out about it.

On December 23, 1948, Hideki Tojo and six other Class A war criminals were hanged. The next day, all Class A suspects who had not been indicted were released (aside from the seven who were executed, eighteen were given very long or life sentences.) Sasakawa and Kodama were among those who were released. There is much speculation surrounding Sasakawa's release. While some suggest that there was simply not enough evidence to indict him of Class A war crimes, others believe it was due to a lack of resources available to carry out trials of all suspected war criminals. The two men subsequently chose different paths in life, but maintained their friendship until the death of Kodama in 1984.

== Post-war activities ==
Sasakawa became deeply involved in the post-war reconstruction; though he never again entered politics, he used his considerable influence to bolster business and political parties. The most effective of his post-war activities was the creation of a gambling industry that is still in existence today. Along with his friends Syngman Rhee, the first President of Korea, and Chiang Kai-shek, the Chinese nationalist leader, he founded the World Anti-Communist League. Among other coups, the league claims to have played a part in the 1966 overthrow of Indonesia's President Sukarno. Sasakawa stated once: "I am the world's richest fascist."

Sasakawa supported the controversial Unification Church founder Sun Myung Moon (Moonies) in his anti-communist activities. From 1968 to 1972, Sasakawa was the honorary president and patron of the Japanese branch of International Federation for Victory over Communism (Kokusai Shokyo Rengo), which would forge intimate ties with Japan's conservative politicians. Allen Tate Wood, a former top American political leader of the Unification Church of the United States, recalled his surprise upon hearing Sasakawa telling an audience, referring to himself, "I am Mr. Moon’s dog".

=== Nippon Foundation ===
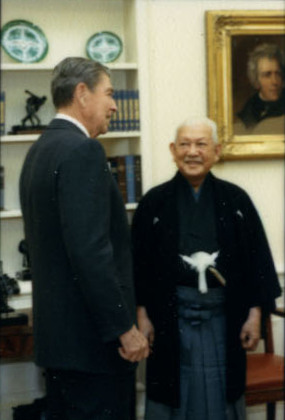
With Ronald Reagan in 1988

In 1951 – after extensive lobbying and bribery of parliamentarians on its behalf – the Japanese Diet passed the Motorboat Racing Law – an invention of Sasakawa's. Under this law, motorboat races are held at 24 locations around the nation for the purpose of both bolstering the local economies and providing the revenue needed to support the reconstruction of Japan's maritime industry and welfare projects around the country. In later years, international projects were also added. An amendment of the law in 1962 provided that the distribution of funds was to be performed by the Japan Shipbuilding Industry Foundation, which eventually came to be known as the Nippon Foundation. Sasakawa became the foundation's chairman. Public and governmental scrutiny on the issue drove Sasakawa to take pains to make the system as clear as possible.

Kyōtei, a form of state-operated boat-racing betting events, a gambling industry is allowed in Japan, established as a means to help with restoring the nation's shipbuilding industry. It was largely responsible for Japan's meteoric rise to become one of the world's maritime leaders by the 1960s. The system is regulated by the Ministry of Transport, and many of the foundations Sasakawa later created through grants by The Nippon Foundation were led by previous employees of the ministry. The system of farming out former government employees to businesses and foundations has long been a common, legal practice in Japan, though one that Sasakawa himself viewed with suspicion.

Under Sasakawa's leadership, The Nippon Foundation made charitable contributions both in Japan and around the world, working with the United Nations on maritime law and with the World Health Organization, donating over $70m to fight leprosy.

The group also founded or funded a number of other organizations, such as the United States–Japan Foundation; The Sasakawa Peace Foundation; the Sasakawa Africa Association, an expansion of Norman Borlaug's Green Revolution to Africa with the help of former US President Jimmy Carter; and the University of Houston's Sasakawa International Center for Space Architecture (SICSA). The Nippon Foundation also runs the Ryoichi Sasakawa Young Leaders Fellowship Fund (SYLFF) for university students across the world.

== Personal life ==
Sasakawa helped form the World Union of Karate-do Organizations in 1970, also serving as its president.

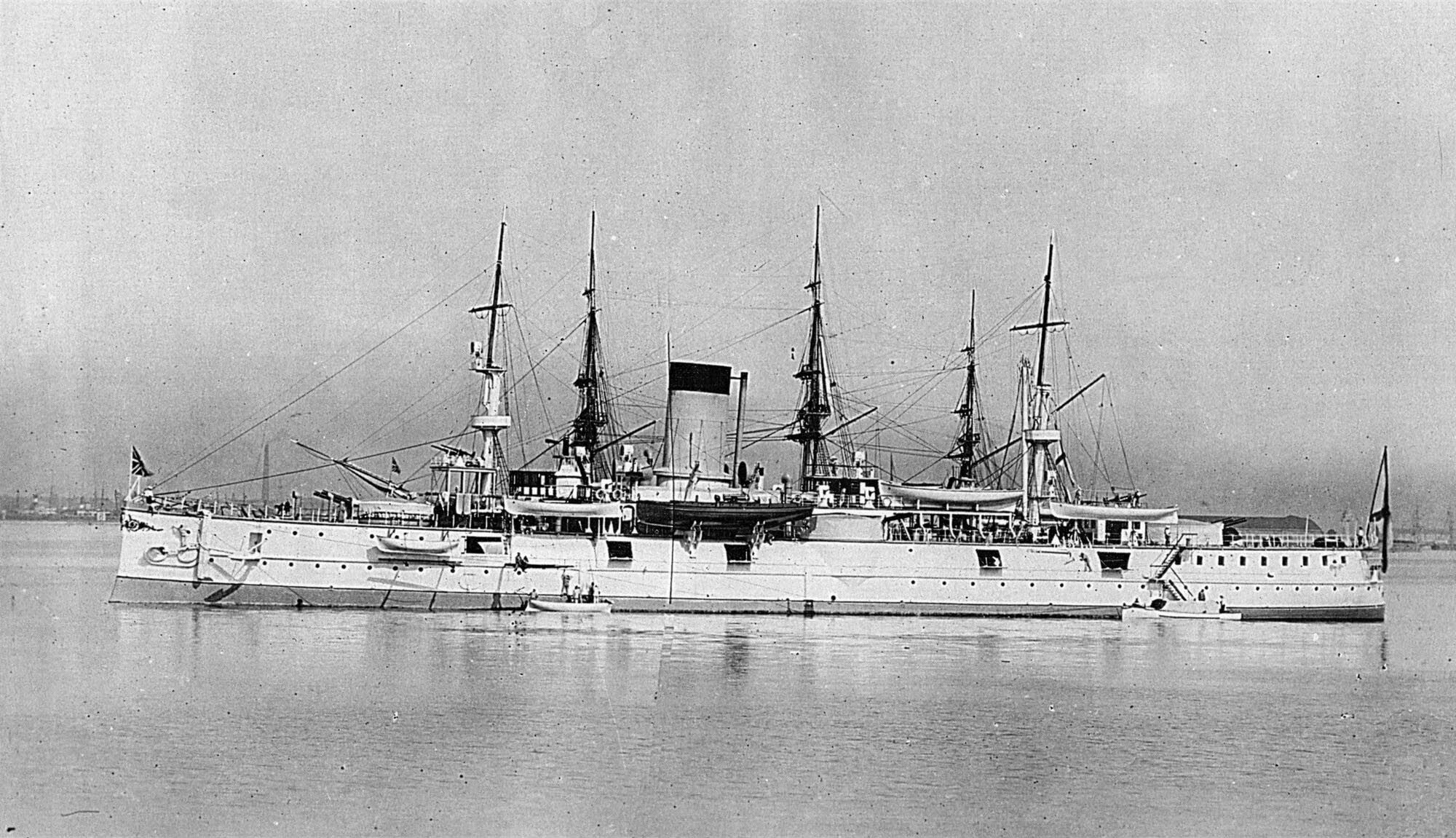
Admiral Nakhimov side view

In 1980, Sasakawa claimed to have salvaged the wreckage of the Russian cruiser Admiral Nakhimov over the strong protests of the Soviet Government. Sasakawa later publicized photos of what appeared to be a valuable cargo of gold bullion, platinum ingots, and British sovereigns, as well as crates of precious jewels. Sasakawa claimed that the treasure was worth over $36 billion in modern currency, but offered to turn it over to the Soviet Union, in return for the Kuril Islands to Japan. Sasakawa's credibility was damaged when it turned out that the metal shards he allegedly recovered from aboard the Admiral Nakhimov had the density of lead, but not platinum.

Sasakawa died July 18, 1995. He had three sons: Masatada, Takashi and Yōhei.

== Honours ==
- 1976: Order of Diplomatic Service Merit, 1st class (Republic of Korea)
- 1977: Order of Brilliant Star, Grand Cordon (Republic of China)
- 1978: Order of the Sacred Treasure, 1st class, Grand Cordon (Japan)
- 1980: Order of the Golden Heart (Philippines)
- 1987: Order of the Rising Sun, 1st Class, Grand Cordon (Japan)
- 1989: Order of the White Elephant, Knight Grand Cross (Thailand)
- 1993: Ordre des Arts et des Lettres, Commandeur (France)

== See also ==
- Deng Xiaoping
- Gandhi Memorial International Foundation
- Russian cruiser Admiral Nakhimov (1885)
