= Pradeep Sharma (academic) =

Indian-American Mechanical Engineer

Pradeep Sharma is an Indian-American mechanical engineer, physicist, and materials scientist. He is the Hugh Roy and Lillie Cranz Cullen Distinguished University Professor and Dean of the Cullen College of Engineering at the University of Houston.

== Early life and education ==
Sharma was born in 1973 to a family in Punjab, India. Most of his school education was dispersed across several countries due to his parents' being in the diplomatic services. He earned a Bachelor of Science in Mechanical Engineering from the M.S. University of Baroda, India (1990–1994). He then moved to America in 1995, where he earned an M.S. in Mechanical Engineering (2000) and a Ph.D. in Mechanical Engineering (2000) from the University of Maryland, College Park. He holds professional accreditations as a licensed Professional Engineer in Texas (since 2016).

== Career ==
From September 2000 to October 2003, Sharma worked as a research scientist at General Electric Research & Development in Schenectady, New York. He joined the University of Houston in January 2004 as an assistant professor in the Department of Mechanical Engineering. Subsequently, he held endowed faculty positions, including the Bill Cook Endowed Assistant Professorship (2005–2008) and the Bill Cook Endowed Associate Professorship (2008–2011). He served as M.D. Anderson Professor and Chair of the Department of Mechanical Engineering (2012–2023). He was named interim dean of the Cullen College of Engineering on November 15, 2023, and appointed the 7^{th} permanent dean effective July 1, 2024.

== Awards and honors ==
- Daniel C. Drucker Medal, American Society of Mechanical Engineers (2024)
- Cozzarelli Prize, National Academy of Sciences (2024)
- Election to the U.S. National Academy of Engineering (2022)
- Guggenheim Fellowship (2020)
- James R. Rice Medal, Society of Engineering Science (2019)
- Charles Russ Richards Memorial Award, Pi Tau Sigma and ASME (2019)
- ASME Melville Medal (2015)
- ASME Fellow (2013)
- Fulbright Fellowship (2013)
- Thomas J. R. Hughes Young Investigator Award, ASME Applied Mechanics Division (2009)
- ONR Young Investigator Award (2005)

== Professional service and leadership ==
- Editor-in-Chief, American Society of Mechanical Engineers Journal of Applied Mechanics (2022–present).
- Associate Editor, Journal of the Mechanics and Physics of Solids;
- Associate Editor, Mathematics and Mechanics of Solids
- President, Society of Engineering Science (2015); member, Board of the Society of Engineering Science (2012–2016).
- Secretary and fundraiser for the Eshelby Mechanics Award for Young Faculty, launched in 2012.

== Patents ==
- Monolithic light-emitting devices based on wide bandgap semiconductor nanostructures and methods for making same. US Patent, issued Oct 17, 2006.
- Fabrication of self-assembling nanostructures. US Patent, issued Mar 27, 2008.

== See also ==
- Applied Mechanics Division (ASME)
