= Lawrence Bell =

Lawrence or Laurence Bell may refer to:

- Lawrence Dale Bell (1894–1956), American industrialist and founder of Bell Aircraft Corporation
- Lawrence Bell (footballer) (1875–1955), Scottish football player
- Lawrence Bell (politician) in 1973 Manitoba general election
- Laurence Bell, founder of Domino Recording Company

== See also ==
- Larry Bell (disambiguation)
- Laurie Bell (disambiguation)
- Lauren Bell (disambiguation)
