= Cullen College of Engineering =

Academic college at the University of Houston

Coordinates: 29.723°N 95.341°W

University of Houston Cullen College of Engineering
- Type: Public
- Established: 1941
- Parent institution: University of Houston
- Dean: Pradeep Sharma
- Undergraduates: 2,569
- Postgraduates: 710
- Location: Houston, Texas
- Campus: Urban
- Website: www.egr.uh.edu

The Cullen College of Engineering, one of twelve academic colleges at the University of Houston, was established in 1941 and is accredited by the Engineering Accreditation Commission of ABET. Nearly 10,000 students are enrolled in engineering courses—7,869 undergraduates, 2,121 master's and doctoral students.

The Cullen College of Engineering offers over 22 undergraduate degree programs and 28 graduate degree programs in leading fields, including chemical engineering, mechanical and aerospace engineering, cybersecurity and more.

The college's master's program in subsea engineering is the first of its kind in the United States. Its chemical and mechanical engineering programs have ranked among the top programs nationally.

Of 207 total tenure and tenure-track faculty members, fifteen belong to the National Academy of Engineering.

== Academics ==
The UH Cullen College of Engineering offers undergraduate and graduate programs through seven academic departments and two major programs:

- Department of Biomedical Engineering
- William A. Brookshire Department of Chemical and Biomolecular Engineering
- Department of Civil and Environmental Engineering
- Department of Electrical and Computer Engineering
- Department of Industrial Engineering
- Department of Mechanical Engineering
- Department of Petroleum Engineering
- Materials Engineering Program
- Sasakawa International Center for Space Architecture
- Subsea Engineering Program

The Cullen College also offers the Honors Engineering Program in association with The Honors College at the University of Houston.

In 2018, an engineering building at the Cullen College was renamed the Durga D. and Sushila Agrawal Engineering Research Building.

== Research ==
The Cullen College posted research expenditures of $30+ million in the fiscal year 2019.

=== Research thrust areas ===
Biomedical-related research at the college had expenditures totaling $4.2 million in the 2011 fiscal year. Projects include research into biosensing/bioimaging, molecular recognition, neuroengineering and drug development/delivery. The college's research expenditures in the energy arena totaled approximately $4.8 million during 2011 fiscal year. Projects include investigations into superconductivity, lean burn engines, biofuels, offshore wind power, and tight gas deposits. The college's sustainability research thrust covers investigations into infrastructure and the environment. These include investigations into diesel vehicle emissions and retrofit testing, urban ground watershed modeling, severe storm management, airborne laser mapping, and concrete structures.

=== Research centers ===
The Cullen College has four research centers: the National Center for Airborne Laser Mapping, the Texas Center for Clean Engines, Emissions & Fuels, the Energy Devices Fabrication Laboratory, and the University of Houston Nanofabrication Facility.

==== Nanofabrication Facility ====
Managed by the Cullen College of Engineering, the University of Houston Nanofabrication facility was developed in cooperation with the Alliance for NanoHealth. The facility features a 3,300 square feet of cleanroom space equipped with devices for prototyping and characterization.

==== National Center for Airborne Laser Mapping ====
The National Center for Airborne Laser Mapping acquires airborne light detection and ranging (LiDAR) imagery for clients on a fee for service basis. The Center is operated in partnership with the University of California, Berkeley. NCALM is supported by the National Science Foundation and is associated with the multi-disciplinary Geosensing Systems Engineering and Science graduate program at the University of Houston.

== Notable alumni ==
- Bill Callegari, member of the Texas House of Representatives
- Rod Canion, co-founder and former president and chief executive officer of Compaq Computers
- Maurizio Cheli, European Space Agency astronaut
- Nancy Currie, NASA Astronaut
- Bonnie Dunbar, NASA astronaut, former president of the Museum of Flight
- J.D. Kimmel, former professional football player for the Washington Redskins and Green Bay Packers.
- Hubert Vo, member of the Texas House of Representatives
- Rex Walheim, NASA astronaut
