= Hines College of Architecture =

Architecture school of the University of Houston

University of Houston Gerald D. Hines College of Architecture
- Type: Public
- Established: 1956
- Parent institution: University of Houston
- Dean: Patricia Belton Oliver
- Undergraduates: 700+
- Postgraduates: 100+
- Location: Houston, Texas, United States; 29.724398°N 95.341554°W
- Campus: Urban
- Website: www.uh.edu/architecture/

The Gerald D. Hines College of Architecture is the architecture school of the University of Houston, a public research university in Houston, Texas. It was founded in 1956 and is one of twelve academic colleges of the university. It offers both undergraduate and graduate level degree programs. In March 1997, Gerald D. Hines donated $7 million to the College of Architecture and the school responded by renaming the architecture school after him. The gift was the largest ever received by the architecture school and among the 10 largest gifts received by the University of Houston.

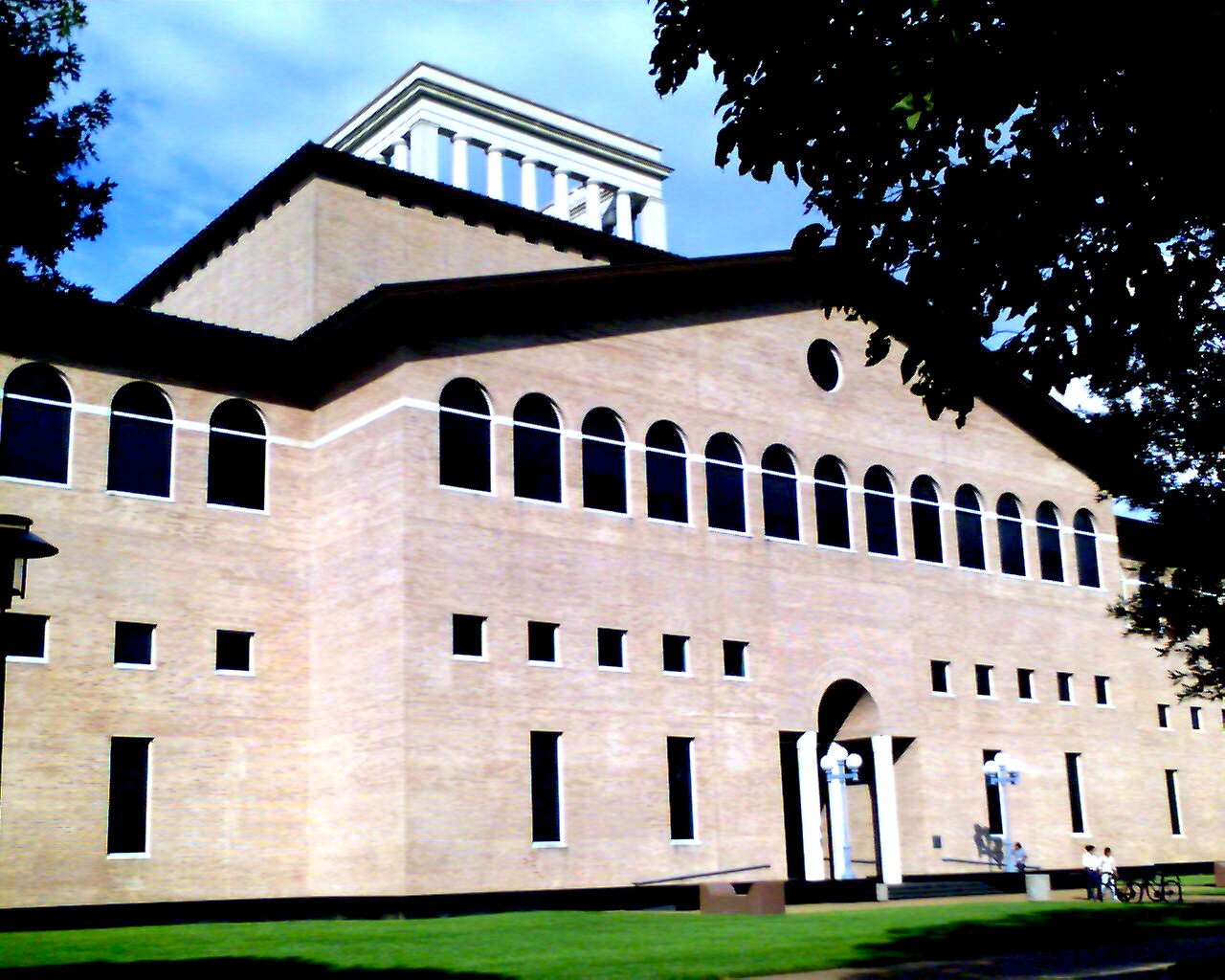
The UH College of Architecture building designed by Philip Johnson, modeled after Claude Nicolas Ledoux's School of Education.

== SICSA ==
The Sasakawa International Center for Space Architecture (SICSA) was originally housed within the Hines College of Architecture building. It was later moved to the Cullen College of Engineering but the student and faculty spaces are still located on the third floor of the building.
