= Nippon Taiko Foundation =

Japanese governmental organization

- 日本太鼓財団
- Formation: November 7, 1997
- Founder: Daihachi Oguchi
- Headquarters: Tokyo, Japan
- Location: The Nippon Foundation Bldg., 5F 1-2-2, Akasaka, Minato-ku, Tokyo 107-8523, Japan
- Chairman: Hideaki Matsumoto
- Affiliations: The Nippon Foundation
- Website: http://nippon-taiko.or.jp/english/

The Nippon Taiko Foundation (日本太鼓財団, Nippon taiko zaidan), formerly referred to as Nippon taiko renmei (日本太鼓連盟) is the largest Japanese organization of taiko performance groups active in Japan. As of 2012, the Foundation represents over 800 taiko groups, approximately 20,000 individuals, and is made up of 34 leagues corresponding to some Japanese prefectures.

== History ==
The predecessor to the current Nippon Taiko Foundation was founded in 1979 by Daihachi Oguchi, the developer of contemporary taiko performance. Generally, membership in this organization only included groups that Oguchi had taught or trained. The group had two goals: to develop productive relations with active taiko groups, and to publicize and teach taiko performance techniques.

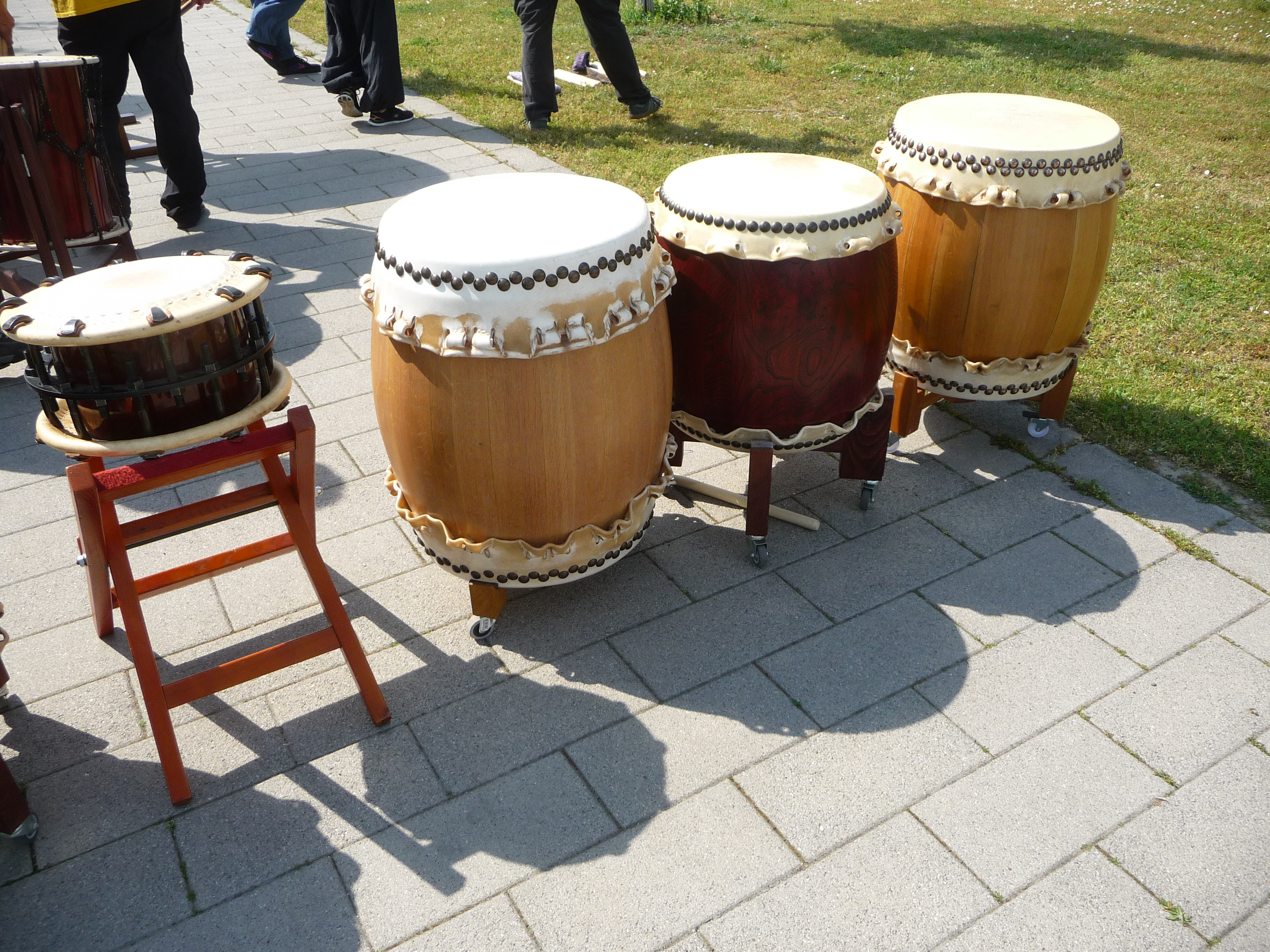
Taïko drums

Membership in the Foundation increased substantially in the 1980s. There were few experienced teachers who were available to teach newer members, and prompted concerns from organizational leadership that it would not be feasible to accommodate demand, particularly because taiko was normally taught orally. To resolve this problem, Oguchi developed a textbook called Japan Taiko (日本の太鼓) that was published in 1994. However, leadership at the Foundation were not satisfied with the publication because they felt it was written too heavily in favor of Oguchi's specific performance methods, and that it lacked a general set of fundamental performance techniques that would allow for an organized certification process. The Foundation later published a more recent textbook in 2001 called the Nihon Taiko Textbook (日本太鼓教本, Nihon taiko kyōhon) that provides a set of basic techniques, such as how to hold a percussion mallet and suggested stretching methods to prepare for performance. The textbook has been revised and was republished in 2006.

In 1997, the organization was renamed in Japanese from Nippon taiko renmei (日本太鼓連盟) to Nippon taiko zaidan (日本太鼓財団), but is still referred to as the Nippon Taiko Foundation in English.

== Membership ==
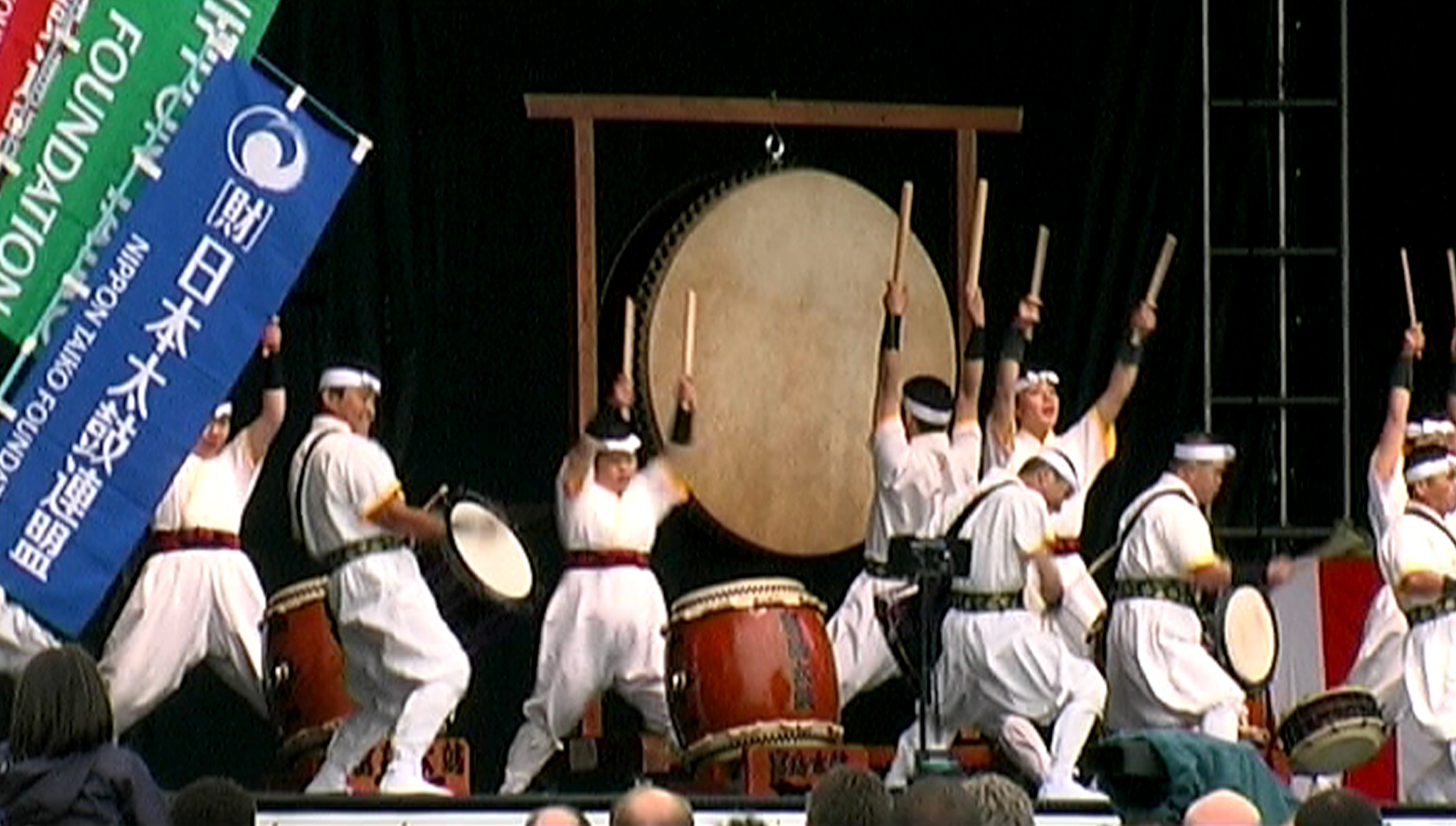
Performance from representatives of the Nippon Taiko Foundation at Hyde Park in London from 2001.

The Foundation has generally been recognized for its work in connecting taiko performance groups across Japan and internationally. As of 2012, the Foundation represents over 800 taiko groups, approximately 20,000 individuals, and is made up of 34 leagues corresponding to some Japanese prefectures. It also has a membership of over 8000 certified instructors of taiko performance at various levels both within and outside Japan.
