= Sasakawa International Center for Space Architecture =

Institute for research and planning of extreme-conditions habitats

Coordinates: 29°43′29″N 95°20′33″W

- Former name: The Center for Experimental Architecture (1986–1987)
- Type: Public
- Established: 1986
- Parent institution: University of Houston
- Director: Olga Bannova
- Location: Houston, Texas, U.S.
- Campus: Urban
- Colors: Pantone 2191 U
- Website: sicsa.egr.uh.edu

The Sasakawa International Center for Space Architecture (SICSA) is a nonprofit academic research and planning organization at the University of Houston. It was founded in 1987 following an endowment from Japanese industrialist Ryōichi Sasakawa. The institute supports the world's first and only Space Architecture program, which focuses on the development of habitats and structures in extreme environments on Earth, other planets, and outer space.

== History ==
SICSA's foundations were established by James Calaway, Guillermo Trotti, and Larry Bell after founding private space startups Space Industries Incorporated and Bell & Trotti, Inc. Because the idea of private sector space research and development was at the time unheard of, the organization was formally realized by the help of Japan Shipbuilding Industry Foundation Chairman Ryōichi Sasakawa, who provided a $3 million endowment to kick-start the schools programs. This was the largest foreign gift ever received by the University of Houston and the organization was renamed from The Center for Experimental Architecture to the Sasakawa International Center for Space Architecture in his honor. In 2003, its multidisciplinary Masters of Space Architecture degree program was designated by the Texas Higher Education Coordinating Board as a Masters of Science "STEM degree" instead of a Masters of Arts.

== Research ==
SICSA Students with Apollo 11 Astronaut Buzz Aldrin

SICSA Graduate testing equipment in NASA's zero gravity flight simulator

SICSA's central mission is providing research and education programs to advance peaceful and beneficial uses of space and space technologies. The program is growing and partnering with other universities and aerospace companies. It is presently involved in conceptual design of the Houston Spaceport at Ellington Field and working with Boeing on Mars Transit Habitat designs. The faculty is mostly composed of architects and former or current NASA employees.

== Facilities ==
Despite the department's re-location to the Cullen College of Engineering at the University of Houston in 2014, SICSA's facility remains within the Gerald D. Hines College of Architecture's main building designed by Philip Johnson. The School was founded in Houston because of its proximity to NASA's Johnson Space Center and other aerospace industries.
