= John O'Quinn =

American lawyer (1941–2009)

John M. O'Quinn
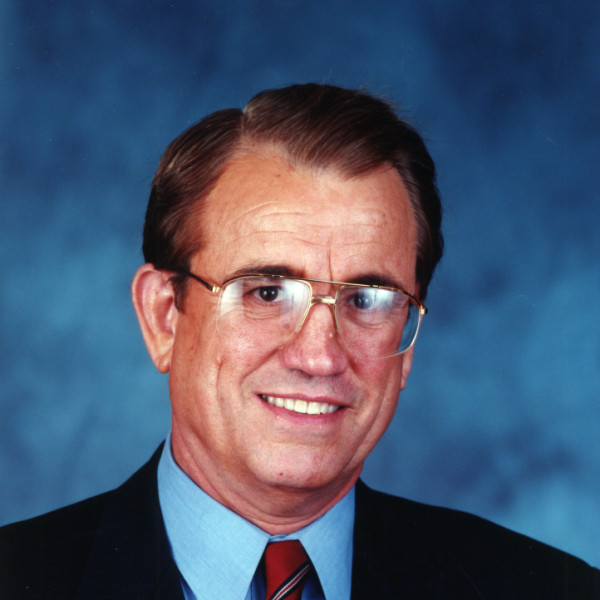
- Born: September 4, 1941; Baton Rouge, Louisiana, United States
- Died: October 29, 2009 (aged 68); Houston, Texas, United States
- Education: University of Houston
- Occupation: Lawyer
- Website: http://www.oqlaw.com

John Maurice O'Quinn (September 4, 1941 – October 29, 2009) was a Texas trial lawyer and founding partner of The O'Quinn Law Firm (formerly known as O'Quinn & Laminack). His firm made its business handling plaintiff's litigation, including representing clients suing breast implant manufacturers, medical facilities, and tobacco companies. In 2009, O'Quinn, along with his passenger, died in a single car crash in Houston, Texas.

== Biography ==
=== Early life ===
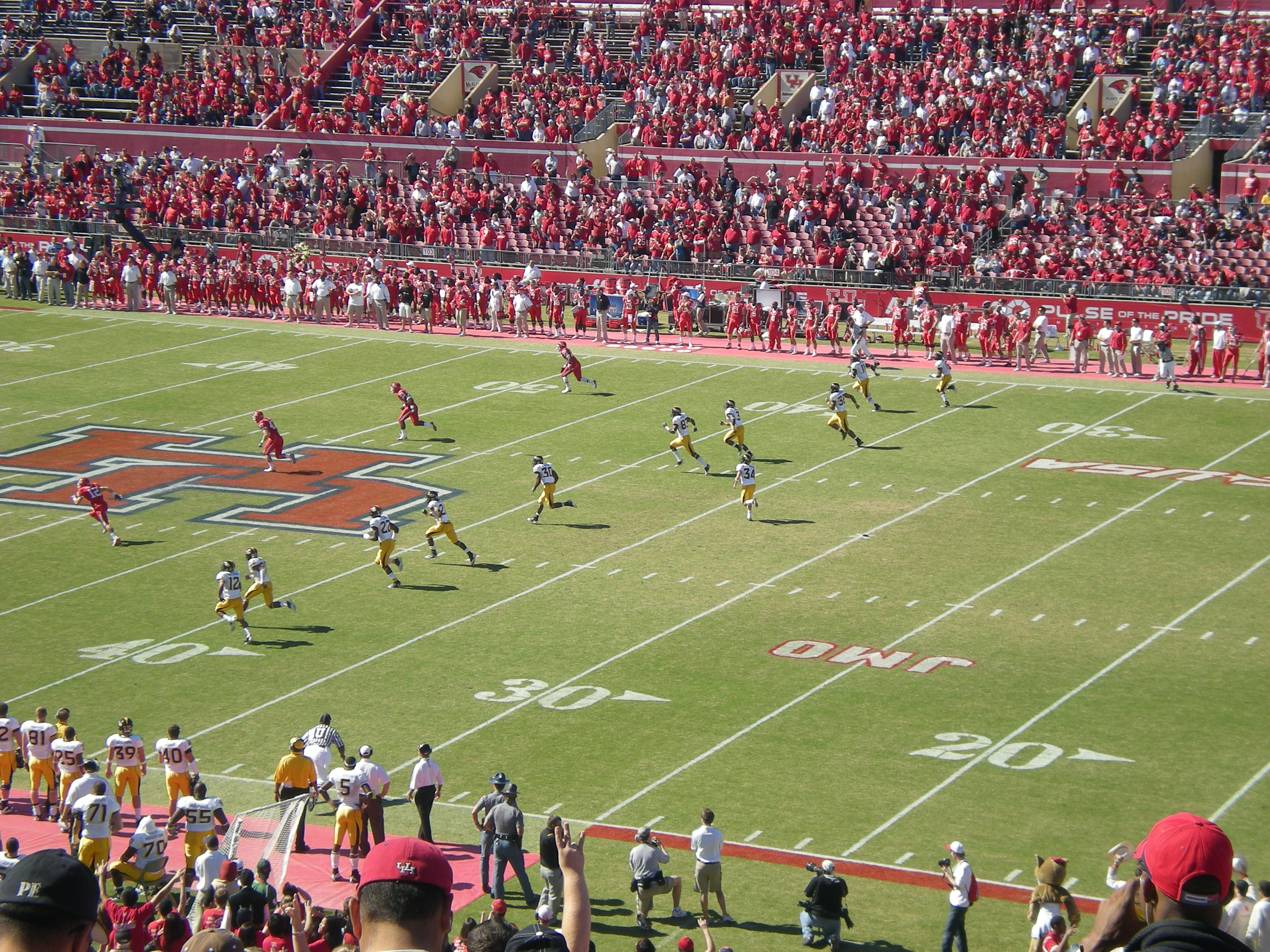
O'Quinn's initials were placed on the field at John O'Quinn Field at Robertson Stadium by the University of Houston during a football game to commemorate the benefactor after his fatal accident two days prior.

Born to Leonard and Jean Wilkes O’Quinn, John Maurice O'Quinn spent his early years in Baton Rouge, Louisiana. The family moved to Houston when O’Quinn was a toddler, but his mother, an alcoholic, left the family when he was 4, not to return. O'Quinn was raised in a post-war era bungalow in Houston's West University Place and worked in his father's car garage. He was a top student at Houston's Lamar High School, showing an aptitude in math and science, and enrolled at Rice University, majoring in engineering; however, after being placed on academic probation for "three of the six semesters there", he spoke with a vocational counselor who recommended career testing to determine the best bet for his future. Q'Quinn reflected, "After the test, I was told I was a people person, I liked to help people, fight for beliefs, punish bullies and that I should be a trial lawyer." At the time, admission to law school did not require a college degree; 90 hours of credit would suffice, so after receiving his father's blessing, he enrolled that fall.

O'Quinn graduated first in his class from the University of Houston Law Center in 1967, served as editor of the Houston Law Review, and won a state moot court championship. O'Quinn was such an intellectual powerhouse that he was the first attorney hired from U of H by the law firm Baker Botts. O'Quinn was divorced and had no children. In 1999, the playing field at Robertson Stadium was named O'Quinn Field in honor of his generosity and support of the stadium renovations. After the demolition of that stadium, the "O'Quinn Field" name was subsequently used for its successor, John O'Quinn Field at TDECU Stadium.

=== Legal career ===
Making his name in handling plaintiff's litigation, among O'Quinn's biggest wins were a $1 billion verdict in 2006 against Wyeth Laboratory for its diet drugs, fen-phen, $17.3 billion tobacco settlement for the state of Texas, and $100 million for silicone breast implants made by Dow Corning.

In total, O'Quinn is estimated to have won $1.5 billion for his firm. The firm went through several names during the 1990s, among them O’Quinn, Kerensky & McAninch; O’Quinn, Kerensky, McAninch & Laminack; and O’Quinn & Laminack. Pirtle became a name partner in September 2001, and the firm name became O’Quinn, Laminack & Pirtle. According to a 2006 article in Forbes, O'Quinn's firm had pending cases against stock brokers and hedge funds for shorting the shares of weak companies, and against Ford for rollover accidents caused by the Ford Explorer. In the past decade, O'Quinn won, through settlement and/or verdicts, more than $20 billion for his clients.

=== Death ===
Around 8:00 a.m. on October 29, 2009, O'Quinn was driving his Chevrolet Suburban on Allen Parkway in Houston, Texas in rainy weather when the vehicle struck a curb, crossed a grassy median and three lanes of oncoming traffic, and crashed into a tree. Both O'Quinn and the other occupant, his assistant, Johnny Lee Cutliff, died instantly of blunt force injuries. Neither man was wearing a seat belt. According to Capt. Bill Staney of the Houston Police Department's Vehicular Crimes Division, the Suburban's crash data computer showed the vehicle traveling at 76 mph just before impact, and that O'Quinn never applied his brakes. The posted speed limit on that section of Allen Parkway was 40 mph.

=== Car collector ===
O'Quinn attended an exhibition of Duesenbergs as a child at the Sam Houston Coliseum, to see what his father called "the greatest car ever built." In 2003, O'Quinn saw a 1932 Duesenberg Derham Tourister for sale at a Houston auction, at which he bought 14 cars that day including the Duesenberg for $405,000.

O'Quinn maintained an extensive collection of cars. The collection had a total value of over $100 million and included at least 618 cars in 2006, and by the time of his death in 2009 he had collected about 800 cars. The collection included: seven Duesenbergs; the 1911 Rolls-Royce Silver Ghost featured in the film Titanic; John F Kennedy's 1962 Lincoln Continental Bubble Top limo, and a 1937 Bugatti Type 57 Atlantic.

In September 2006, he bought: a 2005 Lamborghini Gallardo covered with 33 celebrity autographs ($500,000); the Batmobile used in the filming of Batman Forever ($335,000), a 1941 Packard limousine used by President Franklin D. Roosevelt ($290,000), a 1938 Talbot-Lago ($3,350,000); and a 1938 Town Car used by Pope Pius XII ($250,000).

The centerpiece of the collection is a plain grey 1975 Ford Escort GL, once owned by Polish priest Karol Wojtyla – before he went on to become Pope John Paul II. Bought at the Kruse auction at SEMA, the car was sold by the Pope at auction for charity to Chicago restaurateur Jim Rich in 1995, who paid $102,000 for the car. O'Quinn paid $690,000 for the car October 2005.

In late 2006 O'Quinn discovered that several cars were missing from his collection, including a Ferrari 575M and a 1965 Ford Shelby Mustang GT350. O'Quinn tried to get in touch with Zev Isgur, a 32-year-old ex-con whom he'd befriended and entrusted with the management of his collection of classic cars. Isgur was later convicted of embezzlement.

On October 10, 2011, a car from O'Quinn's collection which is said to be the world's oldest running motor car, a historic 1884 De Dion Bouton et Trepardoux Dos-a-Dos Steam Runabout, sold at auction for $4.62 million in Hershey, Pennsylvania.
