= Randy Hendricks =

American attorney and sports agent (born 1945)

Randal "Randy" Hendricks (born November 18, 1945, in Kansas City, Missouri) is an American attorney and sports agent. He was raised in Westwood, Kansas and is a 1963 graduate of Shawnee Mission North High School, where he was a finalist in the National Merit Scholarship Program. He is managing partner of Hendricks Sports Management, L.P., and managing member of Hendricks Interests LLC, both in Houston, Texas.

== Education ==
- Bachelor of Science degree in pre law/finance, with honors, University of Houston, 1968
- Doctor of Jurisprudence, with honors, University of Houston Law Center, 1970
- Chancellor, Order of the Barons, University of Houston Law Center, 1969, Articles Editor, Houston Law Review, 1969-70.

== Career ==
He practiced law with the Houston firm of Baker Botts out of law school. While there, he represented his first professional athlete in Elmo Wright and became an agent when he was 24. In 1971, he joined with his brother, Alan, to form Hendricks Sports Management. Hendricks was involved in the movement for free agency, a change for professional athletes from the reserve system. Hendricks concentrated on this area until the players earned their free agency in the late 1970s. He continuously represented a significant number of professional athletes for over 40 years. They decided to focus their attention on baseball athletes in the 1980s as opposed to focusing on both baseball and football players.

The Hendricks brothers formed Hendricks Sports Management and built an agency which represented approximately 10% of all major league baseball players for nearly 20 years. In 1999, the Hendricks sold their company to SFX Entertainment for $15.7 million in cash with $5 million in deferred payments and the chance to earn additional bonuses (at the time, SFX was in the market for acquiring several sports agents prior to itself being acquired in 2000). Randy was later named Chairman and CEO of the baseball group. In late 2003, it was announced that the Hendricks brothers would re-form Hendricks Sports Management, which reestablished their profile as leaders in their industry. In 2013 Hendricks transitioned from the representation of active players to advising a number of retired players.

Hendricks is the author of Inside the Strike Zone, published in 1994 and nominated for the Casey Award for best baseball book for that year. Also in that year, alongside Tom Reich and Ron Shapiro, Hendricks was a back-channel negotiator during the league strike that lasted over eight months. Hendricks has negotiated many record contracts, including several for Roger Clemens and his $28 million one-year contract for Roger Clemens was the highest in the history of baseball.

== Recognition ==
Hendricks was appointed as a member of the Houston/Harris County Public Sports Advisory Committee in 1995 by Houston Mayor Bob Lanier. Hendricks wrote the election day editorial for the Houston Chronicle in favor of the referendum for new sports stadia in Houston and Harris County, Texas. The measure passed in a close vote and led to the construction of new sports facilities for professional teams, including Daikin Park for the Houston Astros, NRG Stadium for the Houston Texans and Toyota Center for the Houston Rockets.

== See also ==
- Sports agent: for listing of prominent sports agents, by field.
