= TDECU Stadium =

Football stadium at the University of Houston

John O'Quinn Field at TDECU Stadium
- "The Cage"

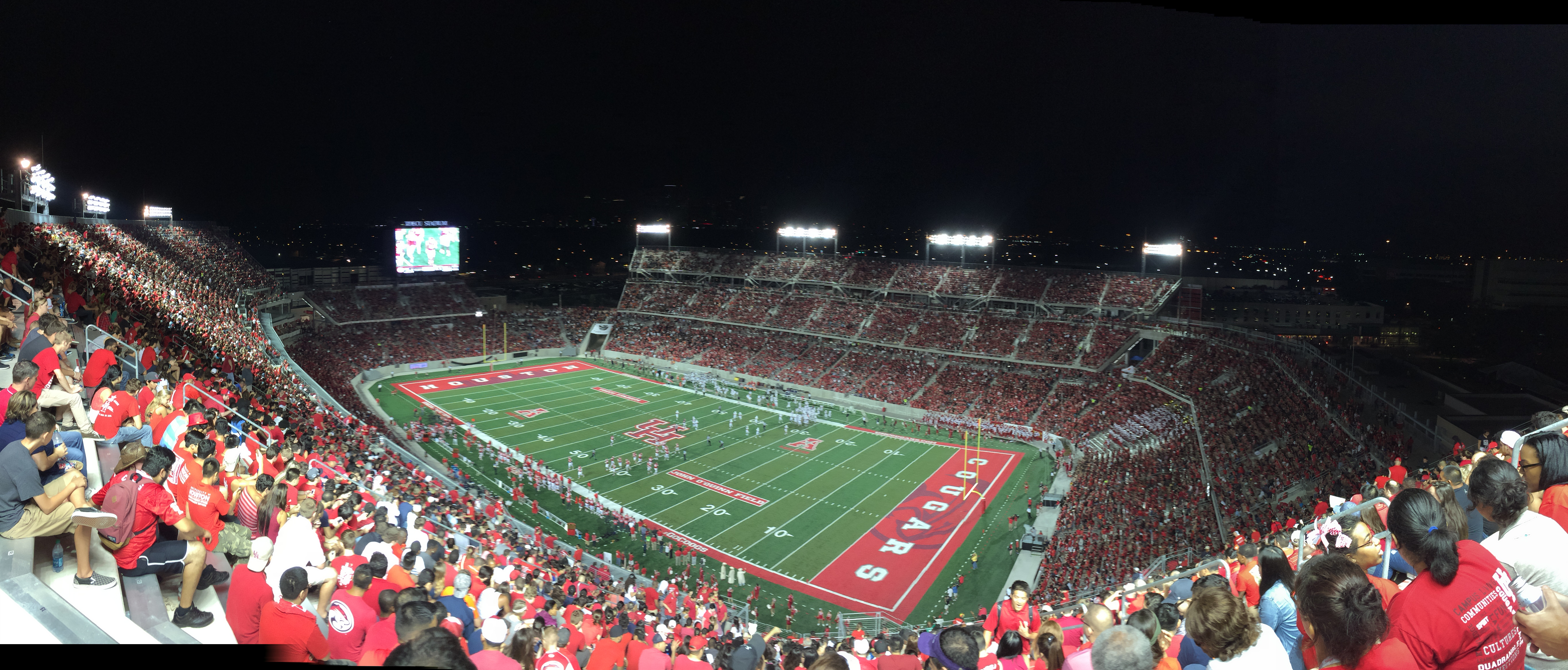
- The interior of TDECU Stadium

- Location in Texas Location in the United States
- Location: 3874 Holman Street; Houston, Texas 77004
- Coordinates: 29°43′19″N 95°20′57″W
- Owner: University of Houston System
- Operator: University of Houston
- Capacity: 39,700 + SRO
- Executive suites: 26 Suites, 42 Loge Boxes, 766 Club Seats, 2 Suite Decks, 4 Party Decks
- Surface: Act Global UBU Speed Series S5-M synthetic turf
- Scoreboard: Panasonic LED HD 160' by 45'
- Record attendance: 42,822 (November 17, 2016)
- Public transit: TSU/UH Athletics District

Construction
- Groundbreaking: February 8, 2013
- Opened: August 29, 2014
- Cost: $128 million
- Architects: DLR Group; PageSoutherlandPage; Smith & Company Architects
- Project managers: Broaddus & Associates
- Structural engineer: Walter P Moore/Henderson + Rogers
- General contractor: Manhattan Construction

Tenants
- Houston Cougars football (NCAA) (2014–present); Houston Roughnecks (UFL) (2020, 2023, 2025)

Website
- Official website

John O'Quinn Field at TDECU Stadium is an American football stadium on the campus of the University of Houston. The stadium serves as the home of the Houston Cougars football team, which represents the University of Houston in collegiate football. In September 2024, it was announced that the stadium would be renamed to Space City Financial Stadium beginning with the 2025 season. It was later delayed until the 2026 season.

TDECU Stadium was built on the former site of Robertson Stadium, which was the intermittent home of the school's football program since 1946. Its official name is derived from Texas Dow Employees Credit Union (TDECU), the largest credit union in Houston, which purchased its naming rights in what was then the largest-ever naming rights deal for a college football stadium.

Plans for a new or renovated football venue were developed by the university's athletics department and their contractors as early as 2010. Demolition of Robertson Stadium began on December 3, 2012, and the official groundbreaking for the new stadium was celebrated on February 8, 2013. TDECU Stadium cost US$128 million to build. The University of Houston opened the new stadium on Friday, August 29, 2014, in a contest with UTSA.

== History ==
=== Planning and funding ===
==== Feasibility study ====
On February 10, 2010, Houston athletics director Mack Rhoades announced that the University of Houston had hired consultant JMI Sports and engineering/architectural design firm AECOM to conduct a feasibility study regarding possible renovations or reconstruction of Houston's Robertson Stadium and Hofheinz Pavilion. Based on the study, Houston officials announced on June 10, 2010, their intention to raze Robertson Stadium in preparation for a new stadium to be built on the same location and to perform major renovations on Hofheinz Pavilion. The plan included a new football stadium with an initial capacity of 40,000 seats with expandability to 60,000. At an estimated $120 million cost, Houston athletics also announced the start of a fundraising drive.

==== Lead gift ====
On August 18, 2011, the University of Houston announced that they had received the largest single donation for the stadium when co-CEOs and co-founders of Austin-based Data Foundry, Ron and Carolyn Yokubaitis, donated US$10 million to the project. Ron Yokubaitis is an alumnus of the University of Houston and former Cougar football player. Houston officials also reported that $60 million had been raised for the stadium, whereas approximately $80–$85 million was needed to break ground on construction.

==== Student stadium fee ====
On November 14, 2011, the Student Fees Advisory Committee (SFAC), a joint student-faculty committee which advises university administration about compulsory student fees, recommended an increase of student fees to specifically construct, maintain, and operate athletic facilities. The committee also recommended that input from the student body was necessary, and that this would be appropriate through a student referendum made possible by future legislation in the Student Government Association (SGA).

On November 30, 2011, Student Senator Jared Gogets introduced the bill SGAR48007 to the Senate in SGA authorizing a referendum for a student service fee increase to be voted on by students as advised by the SFAC two weeks prior. The bill was passed, and a referendum was then organized.

From January 31 to February 1, 2012, UH students voted on a referendum to allow a fee increase to help fund stadium projects. After the votes were tallied, a total of 7,334 students (73.9%) voted in favor of the fee increase, while 2,589 students (26.1%) voted against it. The voter turnout of the student body was the largest in the history of the university.

==== Request for proposal ====
Following the conclusion of the 2011 regular football season, the Big East Conference invited Houston to become a full member. (By the time Houston joined in 2013, the conference had split in two along football lines, with Houston joining the football-sponsoring legal successor now known as the American Athletic Conference.) During the University of Houston's official announcement of its acceptance to the athletic conference on December 9, 2011, Chairwoman of the University of Houston System Board of Regents Nelda Luce Blair announced that the university would issue a request for qualifications (RFQ) to the public in order to obtain new architectural plans. She also noted that ground-breaking was expected to occur in October 2012.

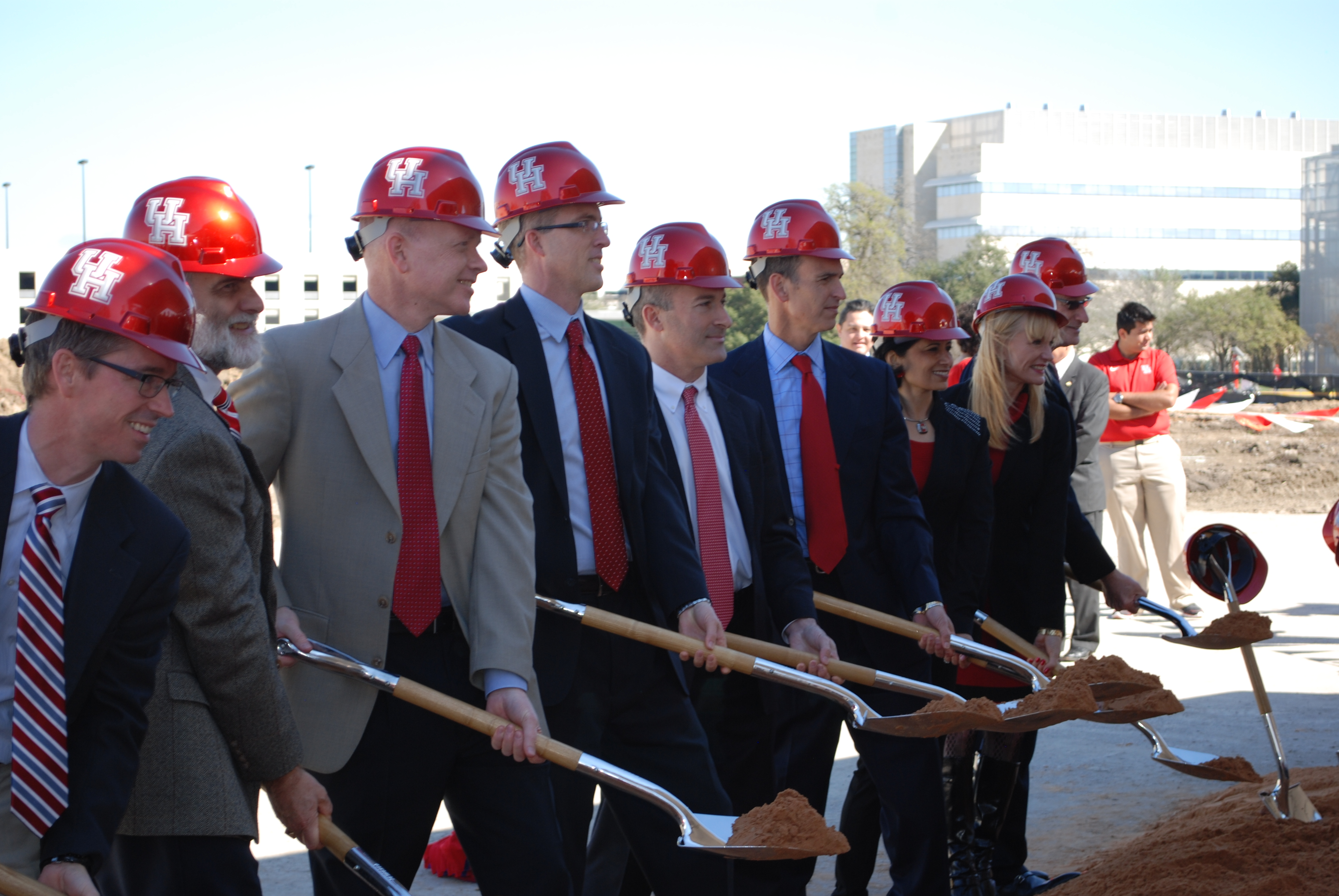
The official groundbreaking ceremony for the stadium took place on February 8, 2013

The ground-breaking date was later revised to December 2012 when the RFQ was officially presented to the public on January 9, 2012. It was also revealed that the planned completion date would be in July 2014 in time for the 2014 football season.

==== Site selection ====
During a regularly scheduled meeting by the University of Houston System Board of Regents on February 15, 2012, the board was expected to vote on approval for the stadium's construction, but instead elected to table the matter in order to re-evaluate the proposed stadium's site until their next meeting. Other possible sites such as the on-campus intramural fields directly adjacent to Interstate 45 and an undeveloped area of campus—adjacent to MacGregor Park—were candidates. On March 28, 2012, the Board of Regents officially decided to continue with the original plan of construction on the Robertson Stadium site, and cited added costs and difficulty in future expansion as reason for not using the alternate sites.

==== Architects named ====
On June 12, 2012, the University of Houston announced that they had hired PageSoutherlandPage and DLR Group as joint architects for the facility. The university also updated its estimated cost to $105 million from the previous $120 million estimate from the 2010 feasibility study.

==== Board of Regents approval ====
University of Houston System's Board of Regents approved an $85 million funding package on August 15, 2012, to finance the first phase of stadium construction. At that time, the university's athletics department noted that they were on-schedule to gather the rest of the funds as necessary for the construction schedule, and the board of regents later approved the final $20 million financing package for the stadium at its May 14, 2013 meeting. At their August 15, 2013 meeting, the UH System Board of Regents approved Phase III funding for the football stadium in the amount of $15 million, bringing the total cost of the stadium back to $120 million.

==== Naming Rights ====
Reports surfaced on July 7, 2014, that Texas Dow Employees Credit Union (TDECU) had purchased the naming rights to the stadium. TDECU is the largest credit union in the Houston area. On July 8, 2014, the University of Houston held a joint press conference with TDECU to formally announce the partnership. TDECU agreed to pay the school $15 million over 10 years for the venue to be called "TDECU Stadium." In addition to naming rights, TDECU enjoys a 50-yard line suite, and their members and employees receive ticket discounts. Further, TDECU opened a branch office in the University Center on campus. The parties have an option to extend the agreement for five additional years at $7.5 million.

On September 17, 2024, TDECU announced a merger with Space City Credit Union accompanying a rebrand of its company name as "Space City Financial". Following the announcement, via social media posts, the company also acknowledged that the stadium would be renamed to "Space City Financial Stadium". The name change was expected to occur for the 2025 season.

=== Design and construction ===
Major demolition of Robertson Stadium, Houston's previous home, officially began on December 10, 2012, however the south end zone was removed by December 6. On December 19, 2012, the Houston athletics department released architectural renderings of the stadium to the public. In conjunction with a press conference, a new website for the stadium was launched.

DLR Group and Page, formerly known as PageSoutherlandPage, jointly designed the stadium to match the adjacent buildings including the new stadium parking garage that had been constructed earlier during the year, but also wanted a unique architectural design for the project. The stadium was designed with a "corrugated metal exterior skin" that allows for optimal air flow and natural lighting. A sun shade study was conducted to determine the best orientation for the new stadium. As a result, unlike the previous stadium, the orientation of the new stadium was designed to be in an "East-West" configuration to provide for greater comfort for fans and athletes. Simultaneously, the orientation allows for a maximized view of the Houston skyline. The stadium site, at its on-campus location, is less than three miles from Downtown Houston.

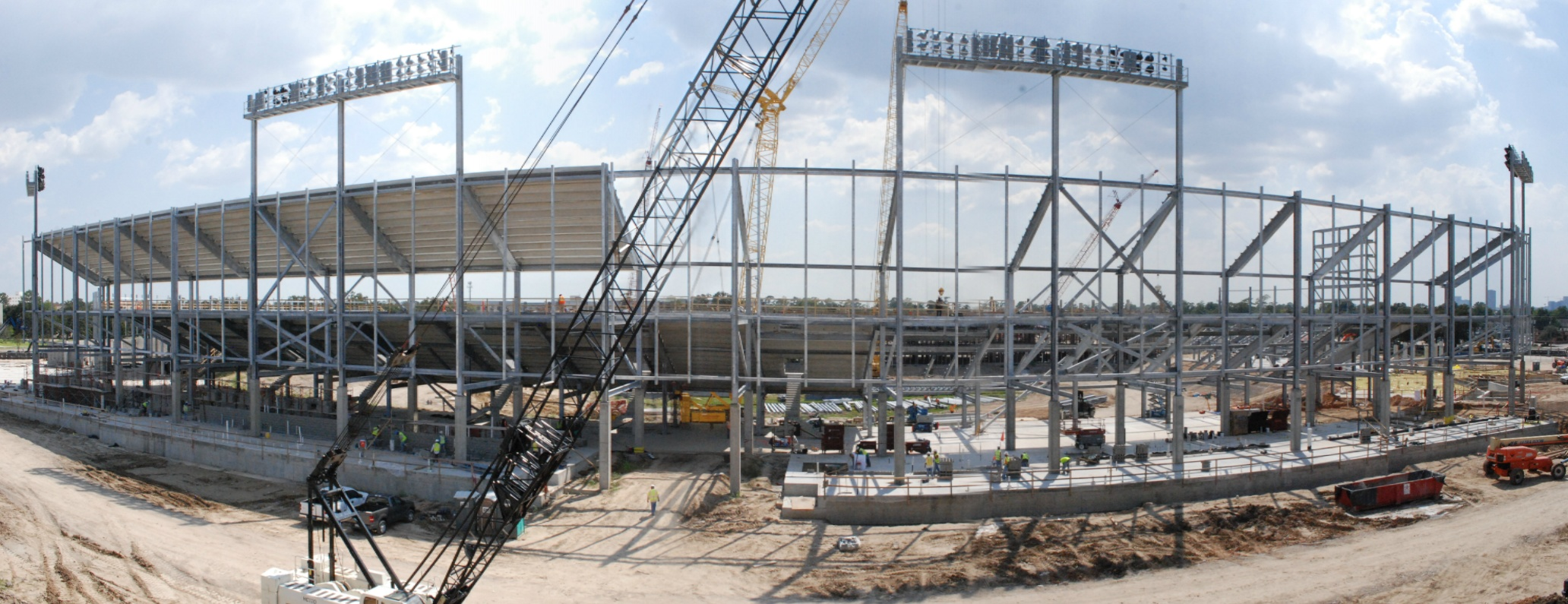
Construction of the north side stands in September 2013

The stadium is an open concourse design with a complete lower bowl built twenty five feet below grade and seating 20,000 fans on top of the field. The premium suites, loge boxes and club level are built on the concourse level in the middle of the home stands instead of on top of the grandstand like many college stadiums. As a result, these premium seats are as close to the field as any stadium in college football.

On February 8, 2013, the university hosted a formal groundbreaking ceremony at the stadium site featuring longtime Houston Rockets commentator and alumnus Bill Worrell with President Renu Khator, athletics director Mack Rhoades, and chairwoman Nelda Luce Blair.

The official seating chart for the new stadium was released on July 19, 2013. In an effort to allow for fans to remain connected to the internet via their mobile devices while at the stadium, in April 2014, it was announced that Boingo Wireless would install, manage, and operate a distributed antenna system thereby enhancing cellular connections. In addition, the company would deploy multiple Wi-Fi networks across the stadium that would be accessible by fans, and support other information systems as well as staff.

In November 2014, The Daily Cougar student newspaper published an article stating that construction on TDECU Stadium is not yet completed, and the stadium is $16 million over budget. Subsequently, the Daily Cougar reported that the cost of the stadium is as much as $128 million, and that an audit was being conducted about whether state funds were used appropriately.

=== Awards ===
In 2015, TDECU Stadium received several accolades for its design and construction. The Houston Business Journal named the stadium its Landmark Award winner in the "Public Assembly" category. The annual Landmark Awards recognize real estate projects that make a significant impression on the Houston landscape and improve the look, feel and image of the city. In addition, TDECU Stadium claimed top honors in the "Commercial Built" category by the Austin chapter of the American Institute of Architects (AIA). The annual AIA Austin Design Awards program showcases excellence in design produced by AIA Austin members as selected by a panel of distinguished jurors. TDECU Stadium added a third design award to its distinguished resume as the facility received top honors in the AIA Houston chapter's over 50,000 square feet (4,600 m^{2}) category. Finally, the stadium won the 2015 Merit Award from the AIA Nebraska chapter. The AIA Nebraska jury commented, "Wonderful example of doing more with less. The jury appreciated the overall straightforwardness of the design.”

== Access ==
=== Transportation ===
TDECU Stadium is accessible via multiple modes of transportation. Houston METRORail's Southeast Line provides light rail access to the venue with a station less than 100 yards from the Southwest entrance of the stadium. In the future, the stadium will also be accessible by the University Line. While the University Line is still in planning stages, construction on the Southeast Line is complete and the line became operational several months before the 2015 season. Built at a cost in excess of $800 million, the Southeast Line connects the Houston Theater District to the Astros' Daikin Park, the Dynamo's Shell Energy Stadium, the Cougars' new TDECU Stadium, and beyond to MacGregor Park.

TDECU Stadium is located between multiple roadways in a central area of Houston and within a mile of Interstate 45. The stadium is also accessible via several lines of the Metropolitan Transit Authority of Harris County. Taxis, Uber, and cycle rickshaws continue to service the stadium.

=== Parking ===
There are a total of 3,382 parking spaces adjacent to TDECU stadium after the loss of 353 spaces due to the indoor practice facility. The $26 million stadium garage, which opened in 2012, provides 2,268 spots. In addition, there are 1,114 surface spots in the immediate vicinity of the stadium. There are thousands of additional parking places in satellite lots and other parking garages around campus.

== Features ==
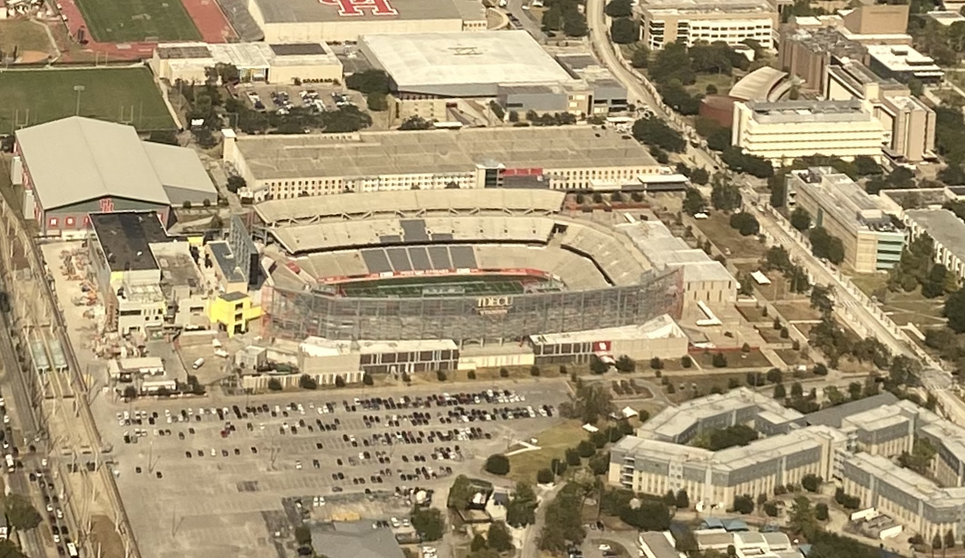
Aerial view of the stadium in 2024

=== Bert F. Winston Band and Performance Center ===
The family of former marching band member Bert Winston made a generous donation to build a new home for the Cougar "Spirit of Houston" marching band in his honor. A 39,089-square-foot (3,631.5 m^{2}) building on the east end of the TDECU Stadium provides three recital halls of varying sizes in addition to classroom and storage space. The Spirit of Houston enters the east stadium concourse directly from the Winston Center, and sets up in the student section of the East lower bowl.

=== Skyline view ===
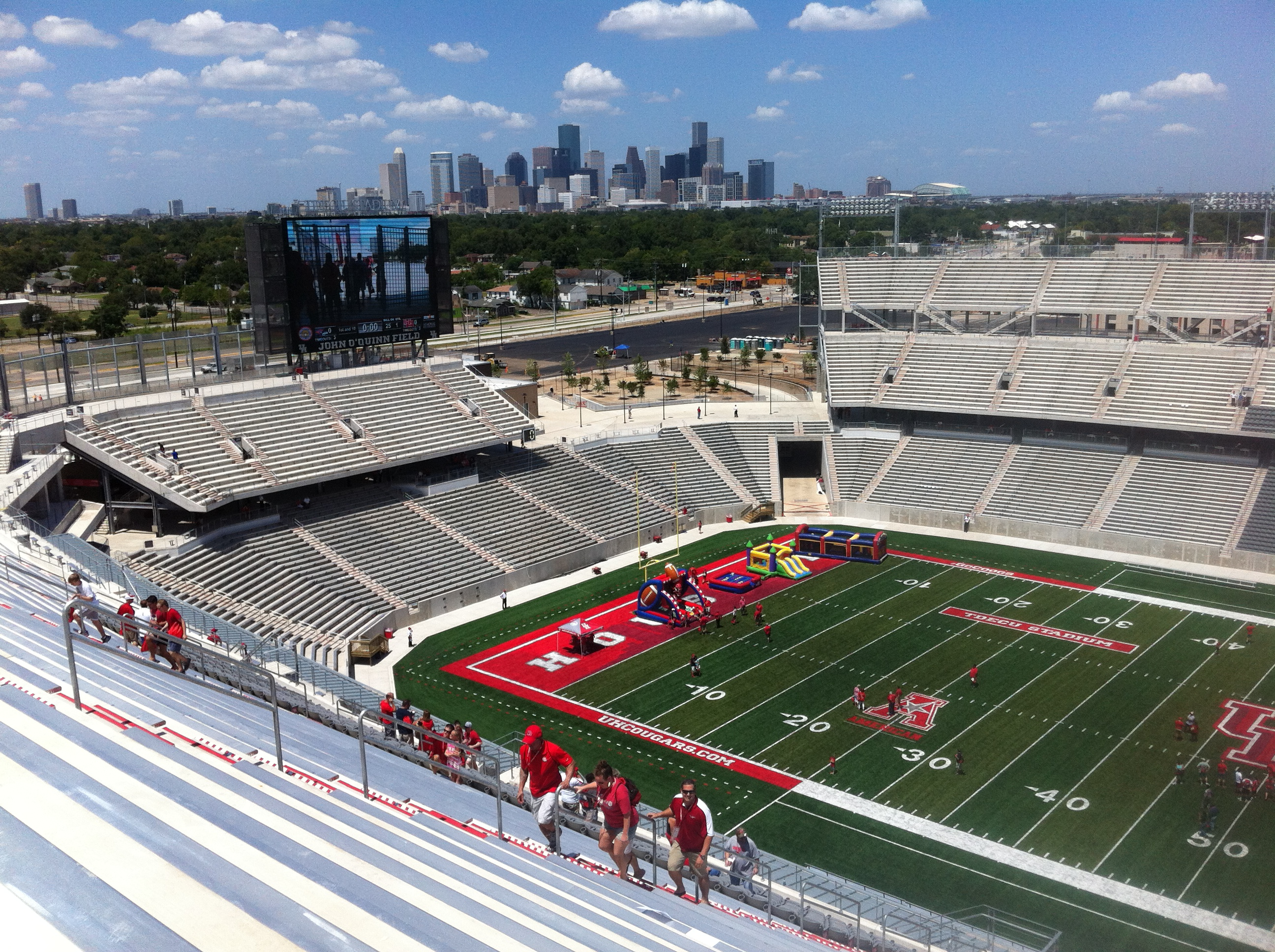
A view of Downtown Houston from TDECU Stadium prior to the construction of the indoor practice facility

TDECU Stadium was designed to showcase the Houston skyline in the northwest corner of the stadium to remind all visitors and television audiences that UH is Houston's university. After a sun study, the orientation of the field was turned more east–west than the former Robertson Stadium. In addition to creating more efficient parking and fitting the stadium in line with the university's grid system campus layout, the change in orientation provided the skyline view to the south side of the stadium including the stadium club, suites and press box. Finally, while the lower seating bowl encircles the playing field, a gap in the upper levels of seating was left open in the northwest corner of the stadium to highlight the skyline view. After construction of the indoor practice facility in 2017, fans in the South upper grandstand (300 level - see picture to the right) retained their skyline view. However, the indoor practice facility occludes the skyline view for fans sitting in the suite level and club level below.

=== Legends Plaza ===
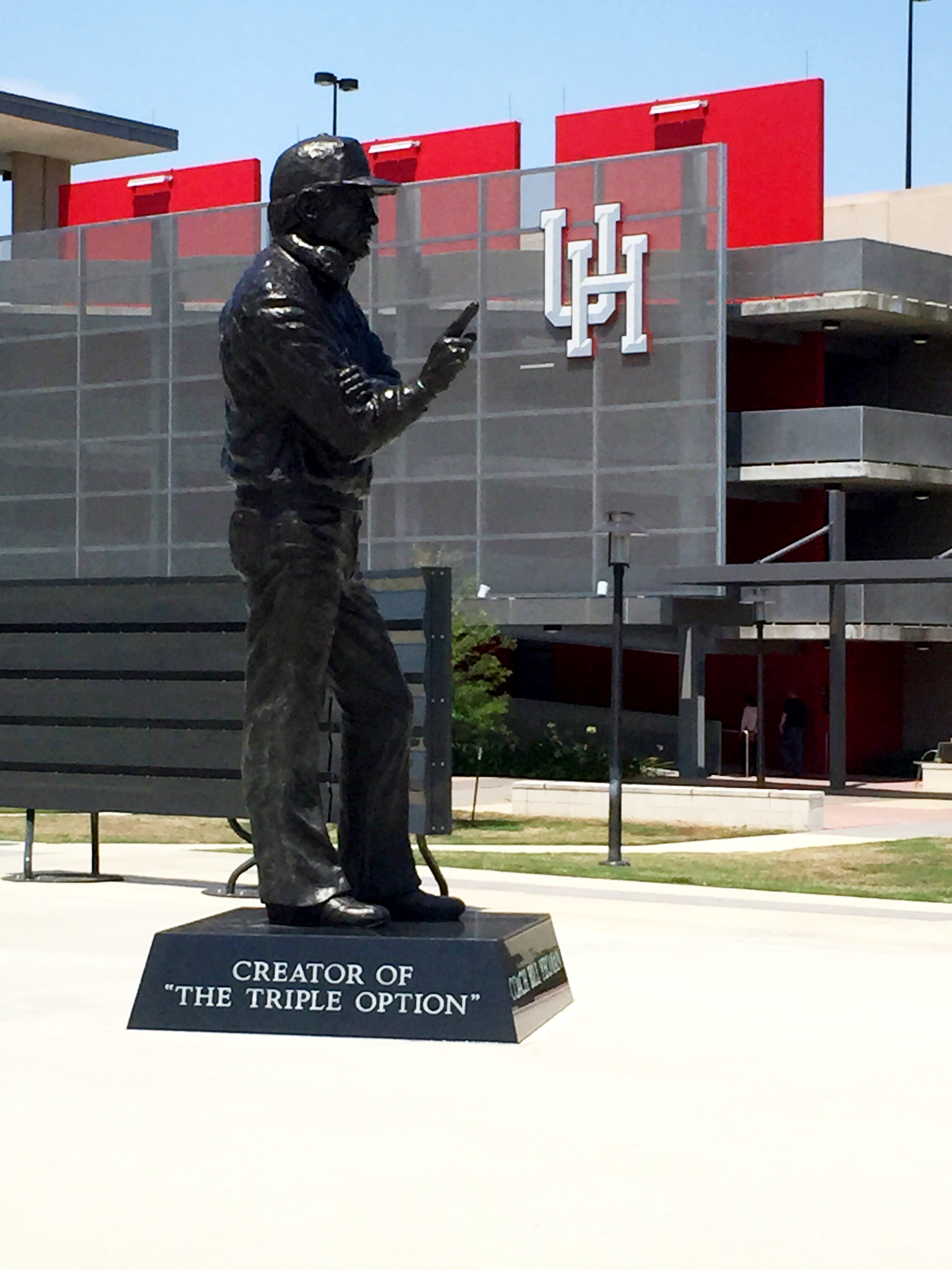
Statue of Hall of Fame Coach Bill Yeoman in Legends Plaza outside Gate 1 of TDECU Stadium at the University of Houston

TDECU Stadium contains a plaza area outside the northeast entrance recognizing the historical significance of Houston Cougar football, including a statue of College Football Hall of Fame Coach Bill Yeoman. Coach Yeoman not only invented the triple option Veer offense which revolutionized college and high school football, he led the Cougars to four Southwest Conference (SWC) titles, two Cotton Bowl victories and 11 Top 20 finishes in the AP Poll while helping to pioneer the integration of college football in Texas in the 1960s. In addition to the Yeoman statue, Legends Plaza contains displays commemorating the accomplishments of Heisman Trophy winner Andre Ware and Lombardi Award winner Wilson Whitley, as well as a bronze Cougar donated by the Brezina family who had six brothers and a grandson play football for UH throughout the decades.

=== Yeoman Red and White Hall ===
Named for Hall of Fame Houston coach Bill Yeoman, the Yeoman Red and White Hall is a 2,000-square-foot (190 m^{2}) tribute area to University of Houston history located on the northeast corner of TDECU Stadium. It serves as a gameday club for ticket holders in Section 129 and the north side loge boxes.

=== Doris Nantz Press Box ===
The Doris Nantz Press Box, named for the mother of Cougar golf alumnus and CBS sportscaster Jim Nantz, contains seats for 70 working media along with a press dining area. Post-game press conferences take place in a wired field-level photographer work room.

=== John O'Quinn Field ===
The Cougars, who pioneered the football use of Astroturf in 1966, return to an artificial surface after playing on natural grass at Robertson Stadium since 1995. The playing field is named for late UH benefactor John O'Quinn whose estate donated $5M for stadium construction. O'Quinn gave millions to UH over the years, including the lead donation to renovate and expand Robertston Stadium in the late 1990s.

Houston installed Act Global UBU Speed Series S5-M turf at TDECU Stadium. The 2013 and 2014 Super Bowls were played on UBU Speed Series S5-M turf. The Cougars installed the same surface last year on one of their practice fields, joining the Houston Texans and several other NFL franchises who practice on UBU Speed Series S5-M.

The playing field itself is uniquely marked. The eleven yard line commemorates Heisman winner Andre Ware's retired jersey number. The endzones are red with white lettering, and are accented with shadows of the Houston skyline and the Cougar mascot. Specifically, the west endzone (where the "gap" in the stadium allows spectators to view the Houston skyline) is labeled "Houston" and contains a silhouette of the skyline. The east endzone (where the students and band sit) is labeled "Cougars" and contains a silhouette of the Cougar mascot.

=== Seating and scoreboard ===
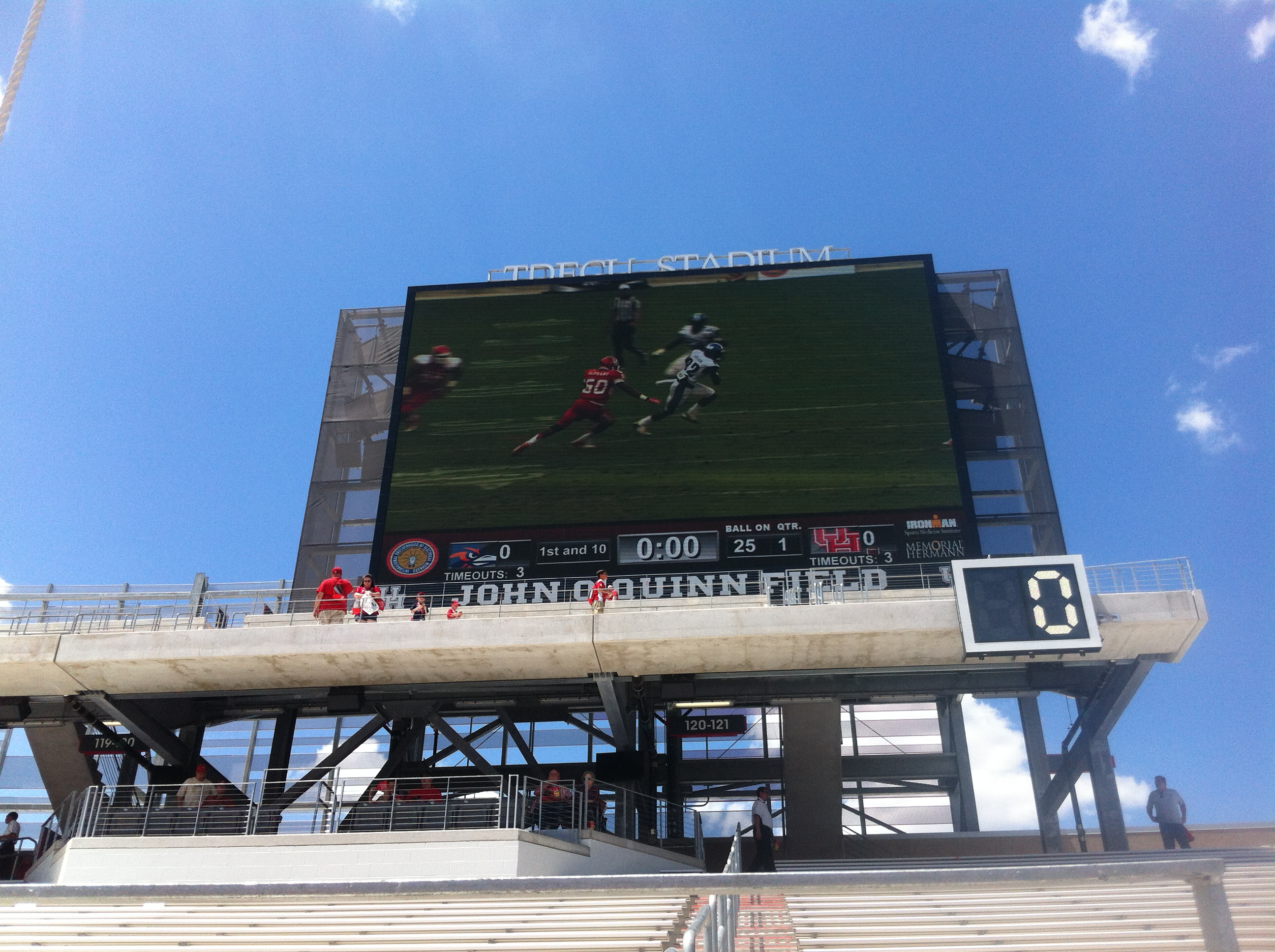
The video board at TDECU Stadium

With 26 suites, 42 loge boxes, 766 club seats, two suite decks, four party plazas and the Section 129 club, TDECU Stadium offers a variety of premium seating throughout the venue. In addition to the sections listed above, there are 3,778 chairback seats and 1,210 benchback seats. The remaining 34,000 seats are traditional benches.

Unlike many college stadiums with premium seating at the top of the upper grandstand, UH built its 12,400-square-foot (1,150 m^{2}) stadium club at ground level. This required the field level to be built 25 feet (7.6 m) below the main concourse level. The padded club level seats are located in the south lower seating bowl with the loge boxes on the concourse level, while the suites are located one floor above the club. Through a 20-foot (6.1 m) glass wall, the club level patrons will enjoy an exclusive view of the team as they travel between their locker room and the tunnel accessing the field.

The new scoreboard measures 68' by 51' with an LED HD video display 68' wide by 38' tall. The video board, designed by Panasonic using Nichia technology, is among the 35 largest in college football, and among the 20 largest in terms of square feet per seating capacity. Houston also installed ribbon scoreboards between the 20 yard lines on each side of the stadium as well as an auxiliary scoreboard in the southeast corner of the stadium.

On the February 23, 2017, the Board of Regents granted authority to the Chancellor to extend UH's contract with IMG Sports. Part of the contract extension calls for IMG to pay $2.5 million for additional LED ribbon boards at TDECU Stadium. Athletic Director Hunter Yurachek told the Regents that ribbon boards will now encircle the entire field.

Additionally, UH announced in January 2017 that it will install 1,000 new chairback seats in Sections 127 and 131 for the 2017 season, replacing the original bench seating.

=== Cougar Cage ===
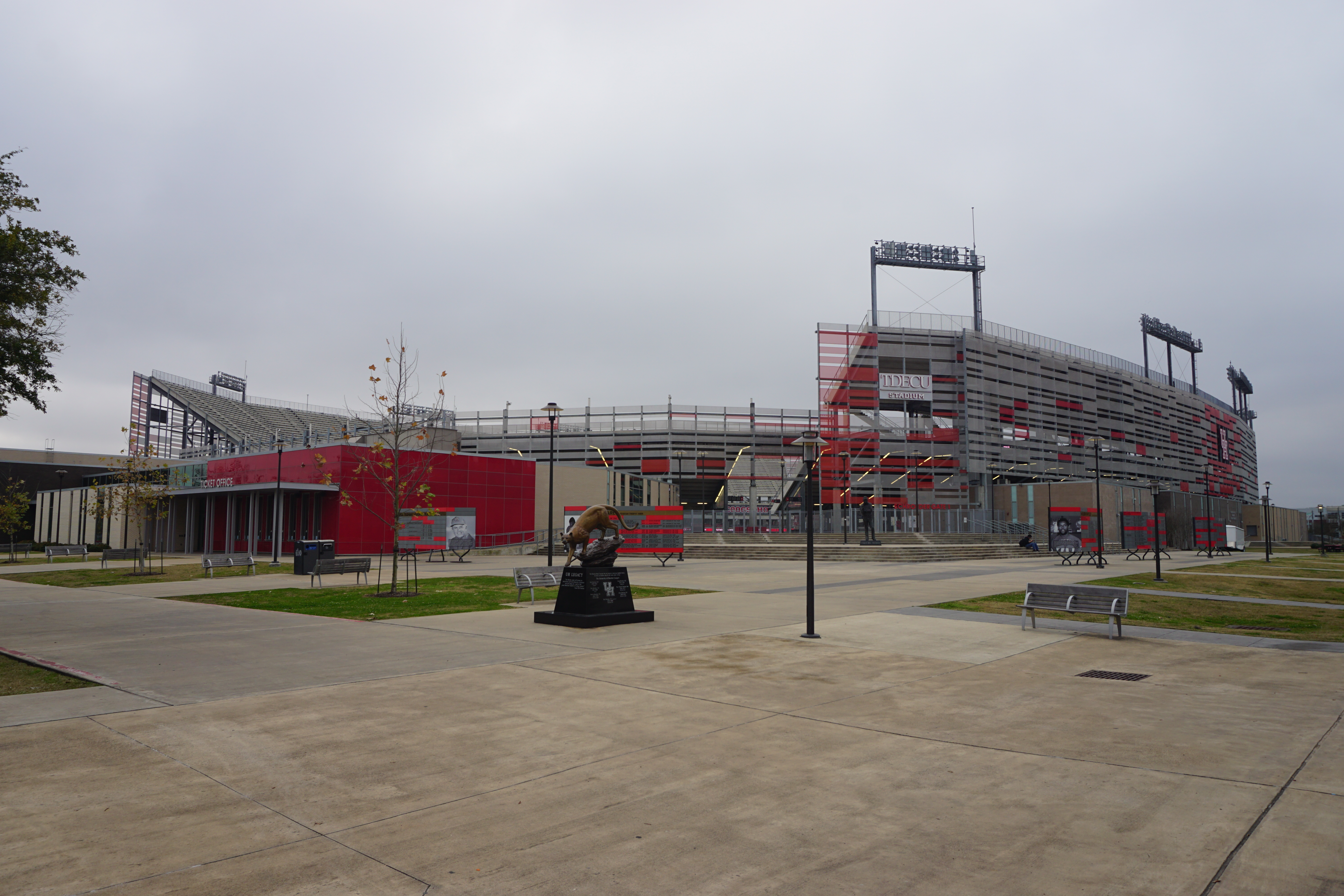
Cougar Cage Exterior - entrance terrace

The upper stadium bowl exterior skin is a combination of red powder-coated corrugated metal and aluminum panels providing long-term durability with minimal maintenance. Goals behind the design of the exterior skin included allowing natural light into the concourse while still protecting fans from the elements, and assuring ample air flow throughout the concourse and stadium for fan comfort without hindering the performance of student athletes.

=== Adjacent Indoor Practice Facility ===
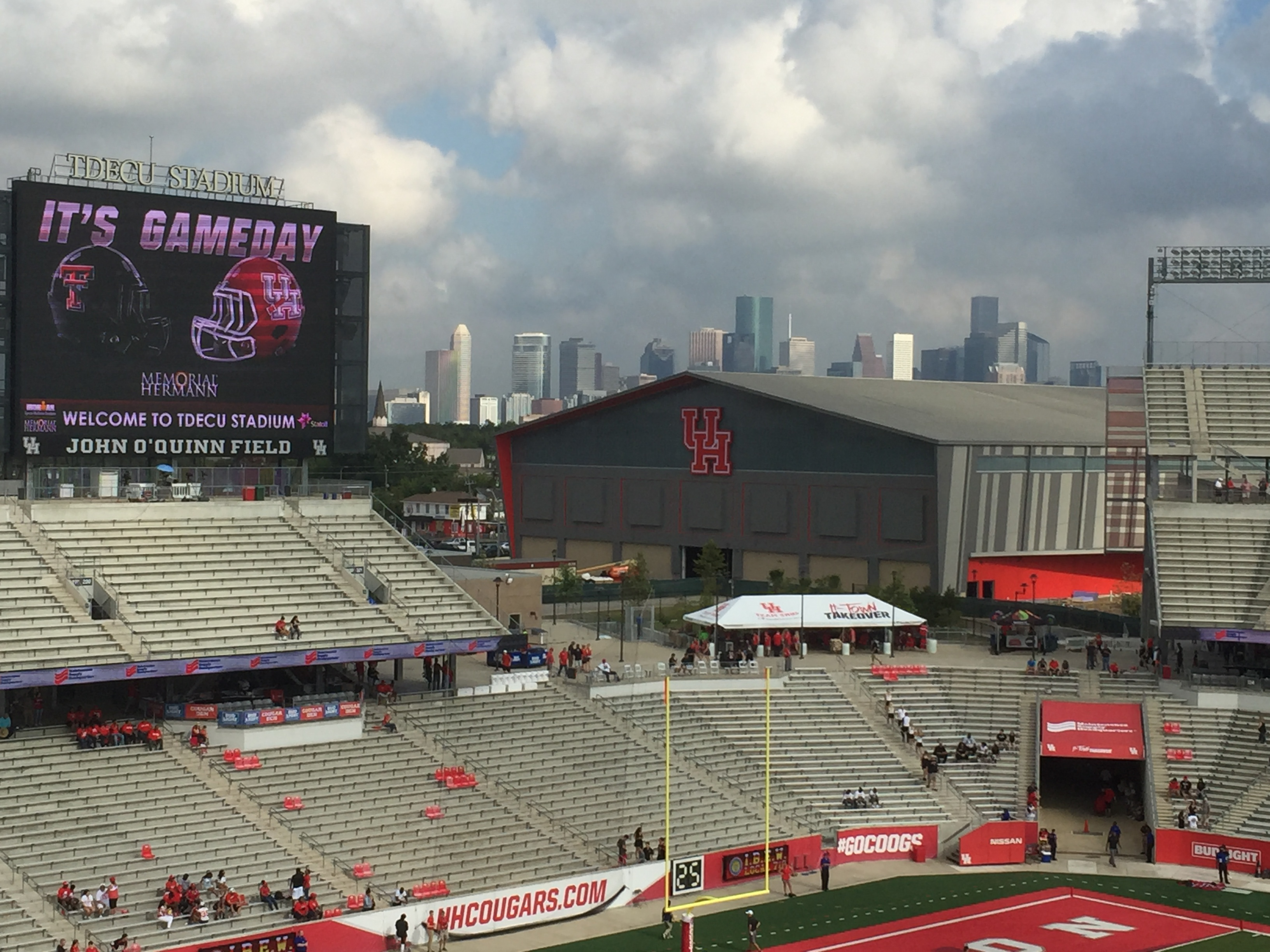
Houston indoor practice facility

On August 25, 2016, the University of Houston System Board of Regents authorized the design and construction of an indoor practice facility. The structure houses a temperature-controlled indoor practice facility with a full-size synthetic turf field and an auxiliary area dedicated for a future buildout of a football-only weight room. Construction on the $20 million facility began following the 2016 season and was completed in the fall of 2017. The facility is located near the northwest corner of the stadium, next to the stadium parking garage.

=== Future expansion ===
While the stadium seats 40,000, it was designed for potential future capacity of 60,000 seats. This includes the strategic placement and installation of foundations in the original construction phase to accommodate future expansion. Approximately 10,000 seats can be added to the north sideline upper grandstand, and another 10,000 seats can be added with upper end zone grandstands.

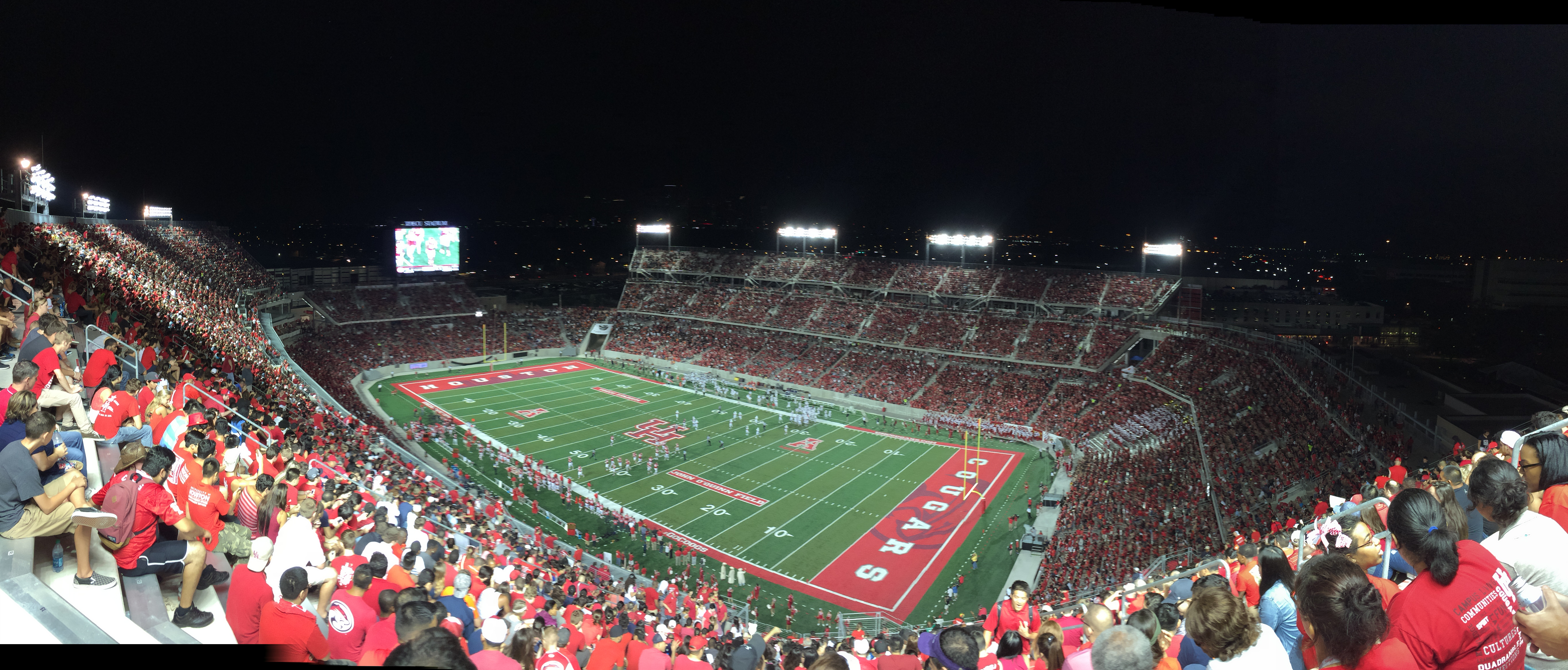
Panoramic view of TDECU Stadium

== Tailgating ==
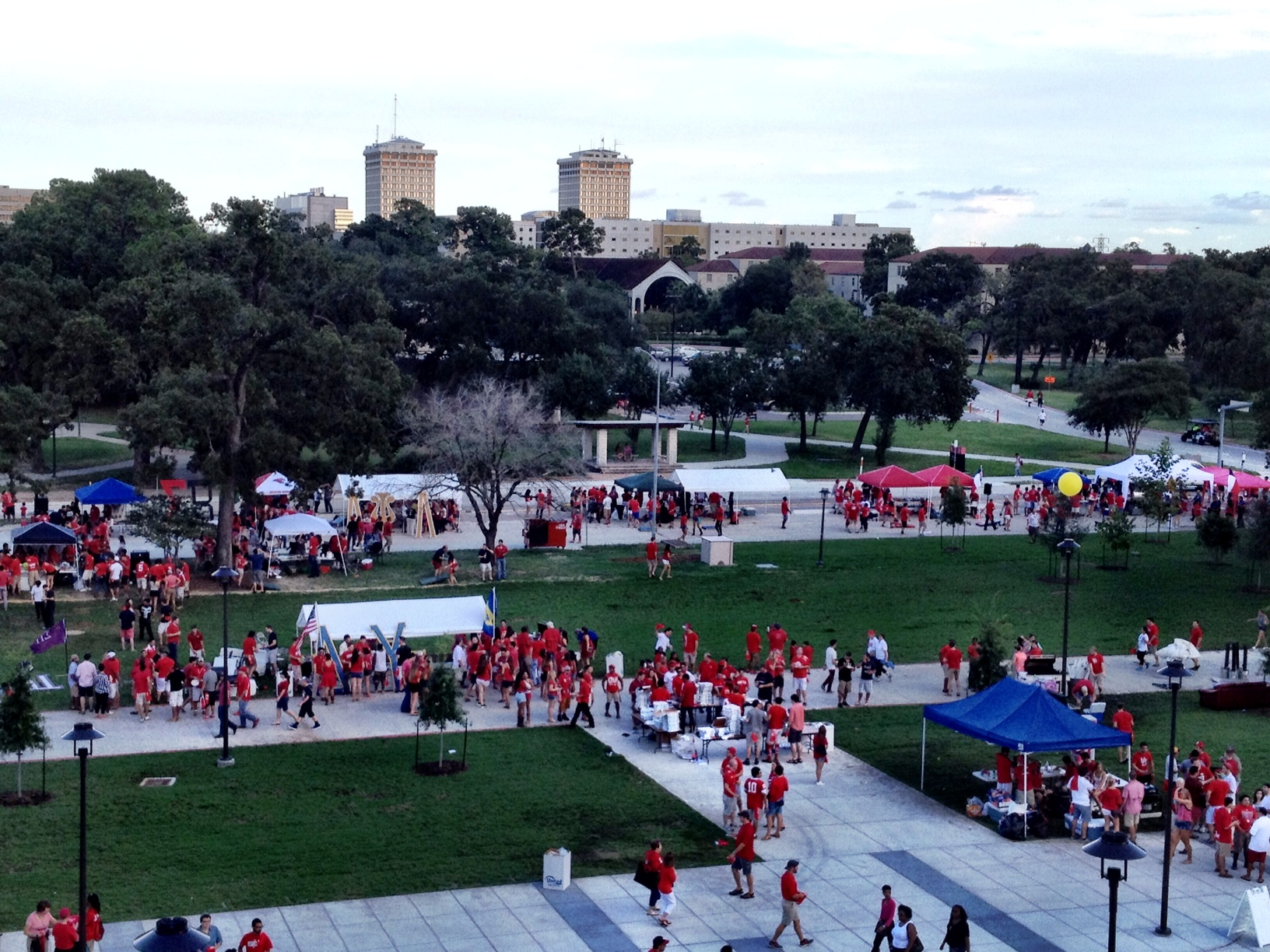
Shasta Square tailgate at TDECU Stadium

On game days, the University of Houston closes Cullen Boulevard from Holman Street to Cougar Place dormitory for the purpose of tailgating. Students groups set up tents on Cullen and the stadium grounds as a part of the "Shasta Square" tailgate just east of the stadium, while the University of Houston Alumni Organization hosts "Party on the Plaza" next to the students.

RVs, which formerly parked in the lot on which the Indoor Practice Facility was built, now tailgate in lot 16B off Elgin near the Hines School of Architecture and Blaffer Art Museum. Finally, fans tailgate in the various surface parking lots and adjoining green space across campus.

== Home field advantage and attendance ==
Houston won sixteen straight football games at TDECU Stadium from 2014 to 2017, including four wins over ranked opponents. This was the longest active home winning streak in the nation at the time. The 2015 Houston Cougar football team finished a perfect 8–0 at home, and the 2016 team went undefeated in six home games. Overall, Houston's record at TDECU Stadium is now 52–25, including 8–9 against ranked teams.

=== Top 10 TDECU Stadium Crowds ===
Rankings are from the AP Poll released prior to the game.

Ranking	Attendance	Date	Score
1	42,822	November 17, 2016	Houston 36, #3 Louisville 10
2	42,812	October 21, 2023	Houston 24, #8 Texas 31
3	42,806	October 4, 2025	Houston 11, #11 Texas Tech 35
4	42,544	October 17, 2026	#20 Houston 35, #18 Oklahoma State 32
5	42,159	November 14, 2015	#16 Houston 35, #25 Memphis 34
6	40,873	September 29, 2016	#6 Houston 42, UConn 14
7	40,755	August 29, 2014	Houston 7, UTSA 27
8	40,562	November 27, 2015	#21 Houston 52, #16 Navy 31
9	39,402	September 10, 2016	#6 Houston 42, Lamar 0
10	38,900	September 16, 2017	Houston 38, Rice 3

== Milestones & Notable Games at TDECU ==
Rankings are from the AP Poll released prior to the game.

Milestone	Date	Opponent	Score
First game, first night game, first televised game (ESPNU)	Aug. 29, 2014	UTSA	UTSA 27, Houston 7
First win at TDECU	Sept. 6, 2014	Grambling	Houston 47, Grambing 0
First day game	Nov. 8, 2014	Tulane	Tulane 31, Houston 24
First game in the American, first Thursday game	Oct. 2, 2014	UCF	UCF 17, Houston 12
First win in the American, first Friday game, first televised win (ESPNU)	Oct. 17, 2014	Temple	Houston 31, Temple 10
First game/win versus Power Five team (SEC), first game/win as ranked team	Oct. 31, 2015	Vanderbilt	#18 Houston 34, Vanderbilt 0
First network telecast (ABC)	Nov. 27, 2015	Navy	#21 Houston 52, #16 Navy 31
First game/win as Top 10 team	Sept. 6, 2016	Lamar	#6 Houston 42, Lamar 0
First game/win versus ranked team	Nov. 14, 2015	Memphis	#16 Houston 35, #25 Memphis 34
First game/win versus Top 5 team, first game/win versus ACC team	Nov. 17, 2016	Louisville	Houston 36, #3 Louisville 10
First conference game as a member of the Big 12	Sept. 16, 2023	TCU	TCU 36, Houston 13
First conference win as a member of the Big 12	Oct. 12, 2023	West Virginia	Houston 41, West Virginia 39
First game versus Big 12 team	Sept. 23, 2017	Texas Tech	Texas Tech 27, Houston 24
First game/win versus Pac-12 team	Sept. 8, 2018	Arizona	Houston 45, Arizona 18
First American championship game/win	Dec. 5, 2015	Temple	#17 Houston 24, #20 Temple 13
First Bayou Bucket game/win	Sept. 16, 2017	Rice	Houston 38, Rice 3

== Other events ==
In addition to major college football, TDECU Stadium hosts several high school football games each year, both regular season and playoffs. The University of Houston holds commencement exercises at TDECU Stadium each May. In 2015, actor Matthew McConaughey (whose father played college football at UH) gave the keynote address. Astronaut Scott Kelly delivered the 2016 address, while Arnold Schwarzenegger gave the 2017 commencement.

Additionally, UH students celebrated Frontier Fiesta each Spring at TDECU Stadium and surrounding parking lots. Frontier Fiesta is the University of Houston's oldest and proudest tradition. Established in 1940, it began as a festival to promote UH when the university first moved from downtown Houston to its present location. With the construction of the new indoor practice facility, this tradition was moved across campus to the parking lot next to the East Parking Garage.

== See also ==
- List of NCAA Division I FBS football stadiums
- List of American football stadiums by capacity
- Lists of stadiums
