= Richard Waites =

American lawyer and social psychologist

Richard C. Waites, J.D., Ph.D., (October 7, 1951 – April 25, 2016), a noted board certified trial attorney and social psychologist, is an internationally recognized expert in jury and courtroom decision maker research, a field he helped to develop and that he continues to advance.

Waites is the author of three books and a number of comprehensive articles on law and psychology topics, including a well known courtroom psychology treatise entitled Courtroom Psychology and Trial Advocacy. published by American Lawyer Media.

== Jury research ==
One of the specific applications of experimental psychology is in the study of the decision-making processes of individual jurors and jury groups in the courtrooms of federal and state courts in the United States. Using quantitative and qualitative social science research techniques, Waites has helped to advance the use of reliable and useful testing techniques in accurately determining the most likely perceptions of jurors to further knowledge of jury decision making in specific litigation matters while at the same time improving the quality of courtroom presentations by trial advocates for the benefit of juries and trial courts.

== Publications ==
Between 1982 and 2003, he published many of his research findings and discoveries of advanced trial advocacy techniques designed to enhance the effectiveness of courtroom presentations to judges, juries, and arbitration panels. During this time, many books, professional papers, and articles written by Waites appeared in publications of academic institutions, professional societies, and legal associations. Many of his papers and articles have more recently appeared as part of the curriculum in academic and professional training programs.

In 2003, editors and publishers with American Lawyer Media invited Waites to author a book for trial attorneys and corporate representatives who manage litigation which would merge practically useful knowledge from peer-reviewed social science and psychology research with state-of-the-art trial advocacy practice. This book, entitled Courtroom Psychology and Trial Advocacy, was released in 2004.}

Waites’ published articles and presentations continue to be used by academic, legal, and professional organizations as part of their continuing education programs for professionals who practice in the courtroom. e.g. Seak Expert Witness Conference Crittenden Medical Insurance Conference - 2007, Defense Research Institute – Medical and Health Care Law Conference.

== Awards and affiliations ==
As a prominent board certified trial attorney and social psychologist, Waites is the recipient of numerous professional awards and honors. He is a member of the American Bar Association, American Psychological Association, American Psychology - Law Society, American Society of Trial Consultants, Defense Research Institute, National Institute of Trial Advocacy, and the State Bar of Texas. He is board certified as a civil trial attorney by the Texas Board of Legal Specialization and has received a personal 'AV" rating by Martindale Hubbell.

== Background and education ==
He conducted his undergraduate and early graduate work in social science and psychology at the University of West Georgia in Carrollton, Georgia.

== Professional ==
He obtained his Juris Doctor (J.D.) degree from the University of Houston Law Center and afterwards practiced law as a trial attorney for 13 years. During this time, Waites represented hundreds of individuals and corporations in litigation matters, including more than 70 jury trials. After a lengthy examination and review process stipulated by the Supreme Court of Texas, he became board certified as a civil trial attorney. At about the same time, Waites continued his education in psychology and received his doctorate (Ph.D.) in psychology from Walden University in Minneapolis, Minnesota.

== See also ==
- Jury research
- Legal psychology
- Scientific jury selection
