= University of Houston Law Center =

Public law school in Houston, Texas, US

Coordinates: 29.7239°N 95.3379°W

- Motto: "LEX" (Latin: "law")
- Parent school: University of Houston
- Established: 1947
- School type: Public
- Dean: Leonard M. Baynes
- Location: Houston, Texas, U.S.
- Enrollment: 792
- Faculty: 56 (FT) 178 (PT)
- USNWR ranking: 63rd (2025)
- Bar pass rate: 86.01% (2023)
- Website: www.law.uh.edu
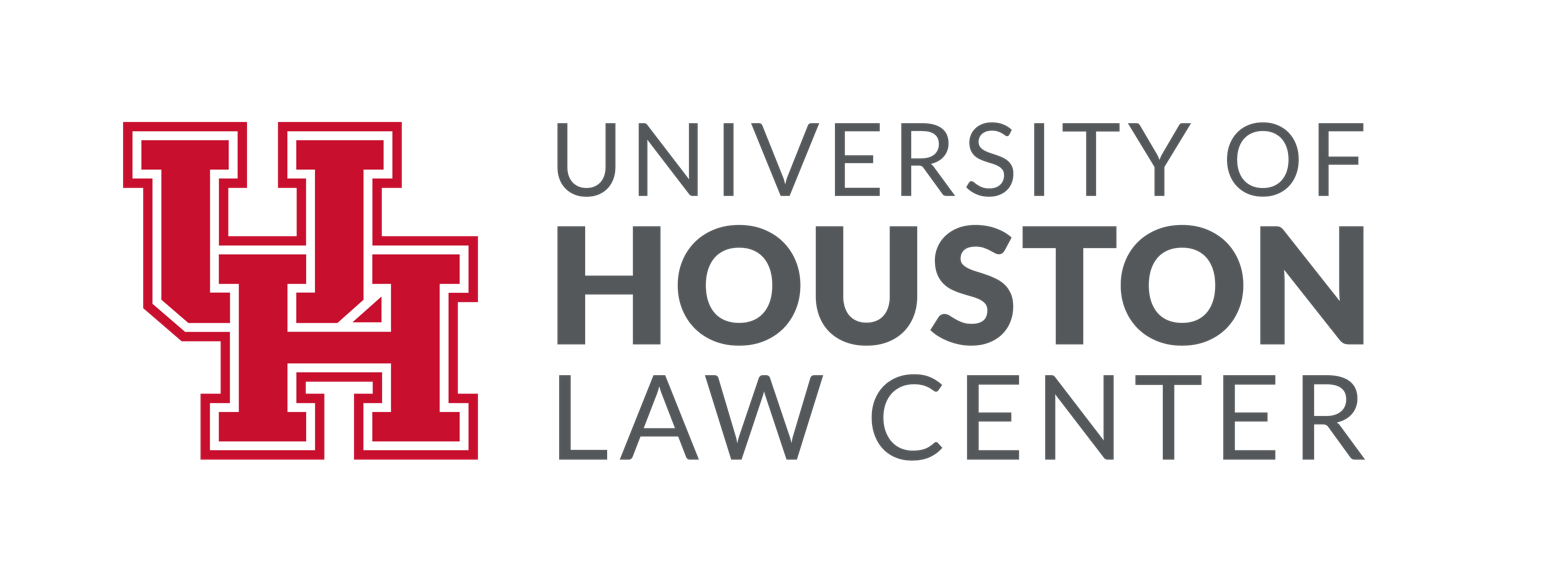

The University of Houston Law Center is the law school of the University of Houston in Houston, Texas. Founded in 1947, the Law Center is one of 15 colleges of the University of Houston, a state university. It is accredited by the American Bar Association and is a member of the Association of American Law Schools. The law school's facilities are located on the university's 667-acre campus in southeast Houston.

The Law Center awards the Juris Doctor (J.D.) and Master of Laws (LL.M.) degrees. The law school ranked tied at 63rd in the 2025 U.S. News & World Report law school rankings, No. 12 in intellectual property law, No. 5 in part-time law and No. 9 in health law.

According to UHLC's official 2023 ABA-required disclosures, 92.2% of the Class of 2023 was employed in some capacity, 85% obtained full-time, long-term, bar admission required employment (as attorneys), and 6.25% obtained JD-required employment 10 months after graduation.

The dean of the Law Center is Leonard M. Baynes.

== History ==
The University of Houston Law Center was founded in 1947 as the University of Houston College of Law, with an inaugural class consisting of 28 students and a single professor. The law school was housed in several locations on campus in its first few years—including temporary classrooms and the basement of the M.D. Anderson Library. The College of Law moved to the northeast corner of campus—shortly following its groundbreaking in 1969 and relocated to the newly established five-story, 180,000 square-foot John M. O'Quinn Law Building in the summer of 2022.

In 1969, the college was renamed the Bates College of Law for Col. William B. Bates, former member of the University of Houston System Board of Regents and College of Law founding committee. Since 1982, the College of Law has been commonly referred to as the University of Houston Law Center.

In 2005, the University of Houston Law Center opened its facilities to Loyola University New Orleans College of Law after it was severely damaged in Hurricane Katrina, hosting 320 of the Loyola's 800 students taught by 31 Loyola law professors, allowing the Loyola students' education to continue uninterrupted.

== Rankings ==
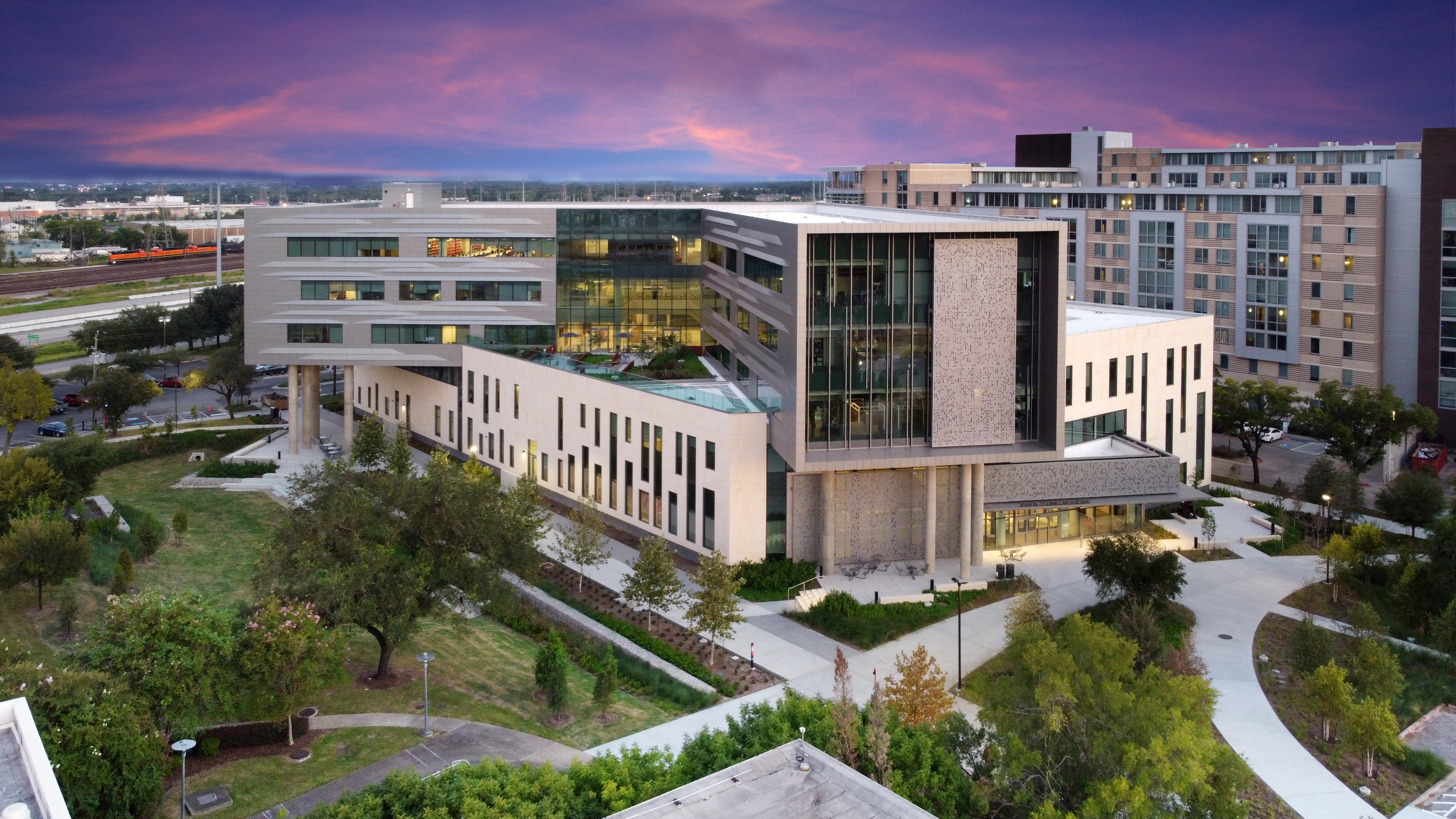
John M. O'Quinn Law Building

In 2025, U.S. News & World Report ranked UHLC tied for the 63rd best law school.

In 2024, Law.com named UHLC as No. 23 Go-To Law School in the nation based on graduates gaining employment in the largest 100 law firms in the country.

In 2024, PreLaw magazine recognized UHLC in Trial Advocacy, being one of 20 "A" schools on an "A+" to "A-" scale.

== Facts ==
As of fall 2023, the law school reported a total enrollment of 792 students and employed a total of 56 full-time and 178 part-time faculty on staff.

=== Admissions ===
For the class of 2023, the school received 3,232 applications and accepted 32.27% of applicants, with 24.83% of those accepted enrolling (233 full-time and 29 part-time students). The median undergraduate GPA among all students at the school was 3.72, and the median LSAT score was 161. The class of 2023 is composed of 44.3% minority and 53% female.

=== Tuition ===
Annual tuition for the 2023–2024 full-time program is $34,942 for Texas residents and $50,132 for non-Texas residents. Annual tuition for the part-time program is $31,079 for Texas residents and $44,309 for non-Texas residents.

== Academics ==
The J.D. program is 90 semester hours. Entering classes are generally divided into three full-time day sessions of some 60 students each and one part-time evening section of some 35 students for first-year courses.

The Law Center has special programs and institutes

- Blakely Advocacy Institute
- Center for Children, Law & Policy
- Criminal Justice Institute
- The Environment, Energy, & Natural Resource Center
- Health Law & Policy Institute
- Institute for Intellectual Property & Information Law

The Law Center offers several law clinics for upper-division students: the Appellate Civil Rights Clinic, Civil Justice Clinic, Military Justice Clinic, Entertainment Law Clinic, Entrepreneurship and Community Development Clinic, Immigration Clinic, Mediation Clinic and the Texas Innocence Network.

== University of Houston Law Library ==
The director of the law library is Amanda Watson. The library has some 435,000 volumes. The library has three special collections:

- The Frankel Rare Books Collection is a closed-stack collection of rare and out of print books and documents as well as publications of the Law Center faculty.
- The Judge Brown Admiralty Collection is an admiralty and maritime law collection. Established mainly from an endowment by Houston admiralty lawyers, the collection is named in honor of Judge John Robert Brown, a Houston admiralty attorney who served on the Fifth Circuit. The entire collection was lost during Tropical Storm Allison, but was rebuilt through the Albertus book replacement project, completed in 2007.
- The Foreign & International Law Collection, which includes books and other documents on Mexican law.

Tropical Storm Allison flooded the library's former location with eight feet of water in June 2001, destroying 174,000 books and the microfiche collection. The Federal Emergency Management Agency (FEMA) gave $21.4 million to rebuild the library collection, which was 75 percent of the replacement cost. The collection has since been rebuilt.

== Journals and publications ==
The Law Center publishes five law journals. The Houston Law Review, established in 1963, is the school's main law journal.

The four specialty journals are the Houston Business and Tax Law Journal (business law, tax law; founded in 2001), the Houston Journal of Health Law and Policy (health care law), the Houston Journal of International Law (international law), and the Journal of Consumer & Commercial Law (commercial law).

== Employment ==
According to UHLC's official 2023 ABA-required disclosures, 92.2% of the Class of 2023 was employed in some capacity, 85% obtained full-time, long-term, bar admission required employment (as attorneys), and 6.25% obtained JD-required employment 10 months after graduation.

== Costs ==
The total cost of attendance (indicating the cost of tuition, fees, and living expenses) at UHLC for the 2022–2023 academic year is $54,633.86 for a resident living on campus and $69,451.86 for a nonresident.[38] The Law School Transparency estimated debt-financed cost of attendance for three years is $197,267 for residents and $239,808 for nonresidents.

== Notable alumni ==
- Fortunato Benavides, JD 1972, judge on the U.S. Court of Appeals for the Fifth Circuit
- Kathy Britton, JD 1995, billionaire, owner of Perry Homes
- Jeff Brown, justice of the Texas Supreme Court
- Tony Buzbee, JD 1997, Houston trial attorney, and member of the Texas A&M University System Board of Regents
- Joseph S. Cage Jr., former US Attorney for the district of western Louisiana
- Anne Clutterbuck, JD 1987, lawyer and politician
- David Cobb, JD 1993, social activist lawyer, U.S. Green Party candidate
- Cathy Cochran, JD 1984, professor and judge
- Jasmine Crockett, congresswoman
- Marcia A. Crone, JD 1978, judge for the United States District Court for the Eastern District of Texas
- William F. Downes, JD 1974, federal judge
- Eni Faleomavaega, JD 1972, non-voting delegate to the United States House of Representatives from American Samoa's at-large congressional district.
- Phyllis Frye, the first transgender judge in the United States
- Vanessa Gilmore, JD 1981, Judge
- Gene Green, JD 1977, U.S. representative
- Richard "Racehorse" Haynes, JD 1956, famous criminal defense attorney
- Randy Hendricks, JD 1970, attorney and sports agent
- Donald Holmquest, JD 1980, lawyer and former NASA astronaut
- Julie Johnson, JD 1991, Member of Congress
- Jolanda Jones, JD 1995, former Houston City Council member and Survivor contestant
- Star Jones, JD 1986, television personality, lawyer and author; former co-host, The View, former Assistant District Attorney in New York
- Krystal LaPorte, voice actress
- Daylin Leach, JD 1986, former State Senator for Pennsylvania
- I. D. McMaster, JD 1950, former District Judge for the 179th Criminal Court
- Gray H. Miller, judge
- John Moores, JD 1975, entrepreneur and philanthropist, and former owner of the San Diego Padres
- David Newell, judge
- Frances Northcutt, technical staff on NASA's Apollo Program, women's and abortion rights advocate
- Dora Olivo, JD 1981, former state representative
- John O'Quinn, LLB 1967, JD 1969, founding partner of The O'Quinn Law Firm
- Larry Phillips, JD 1990, judge, Republican former member of the Texas House of Representatives from Sherman
- Ted Poe, JD 1973, Congressman
- Michael H. Schneider Sr., JD 1971, judge
- Ruby Kless Sondock, LLB 1961, first female Texas Supreme Court Justice
- Mini Timmaraju, JD 1999, president of NARAL Pro-Choice America
- Olen Underwood, JD 1970, Judge
- Juan F. Vasquez, JD 1977, judge at United States Tax Court
- Cody Vasut, state representative
- Richard Waites, JD 1982, President/CEO of The Advocates, an international trial consulting firm
- Armando Walle, state representative
- Brent Webster, acting Texas Attorney General
- Royce West, JD 1979, state senator
- John Whitmire, mayor of Houston, former state senator
- Randa Williams, JD 1988, billionaire
- Philip D. Zelikow, JD 1979, executive director of the 9/11 Commission and Counselor of the United States Department of State

== Notable faculty ==
- Cathy Cochran Herasimchuk (deceased), adjunct professor
- Raymond Nimmer (deceased), professor 1975–2018, dean 2006–2013
- Elizabeth Warren, professor 1978–1983
