= Houston Journal of Health Law & Policy =

- Discipline: Health law and policy
- Language: English

Publication details
- History: 2001–present
- Publisher: Health Law and Policy Institute at the University of Houston Law Center (United States)
- Frequency: Biannual
- Open access: Yes

Standard abbreviations
- Bluebook: Hous. J. Health L. & Pol'y
- ISO 4: Houst. J. Health Law Policy

Indexing
- ISSN: 1534-7907

Links
- Journal homepage

The Houston Journal of Health Law & Policy is a biannual, open access, peer-reviewed, student-run, law journal covering issues in health law and policy. It was established in 1999 and is affiliated with the Health Law and Policy Institute at the University of Houston Law Center, in the United States.

Each year, the fall issue is dedicated to a symposium organized by the journal that focuses on an emerging topic in health care law and policy. The journal's spring issue includes articles on a variety of topics.

== Editors-in-chief ==
The following persons have been editor-in-chief of the journal:

- 2026–2027: Jahnavi Arun
- 2025–2026: Irene Younan
- 2024–2025: Abel Chacko
- 2023–2024: Elizabeth Do
- 2022–2023: LaTheena Thomas
- 2021–2022: To Nhu Huynh
- 2020–2021: Daniel Gonzalez
- 2019–2020: Jennifer Pier
- 2018–2019: Sydney Reed
- 2017–2018: Tyler Hubert
- 2016–2017: Hamish Nieh
- 2015–2016: Joseph Quezada
- 2014–2015: Barrett Schitka
- 2013–2014: Deena Herndon-Remy
- 2012–2013: Ryan Ingraham
- 2011–2012: Jarrett Dzuik
- 2010–2011: Robin Weinburgh
- 2009–2010: Stephen Robinson
- 2008–2009: Jessica Goldman
- 2007–2008: Jeffery T. Wise
- 2006–2007: Keri L. Tonn
- 2005–2006: Sushma L. Jasti
- 2004–2005: Martha M. Beard
- 2004–2004: Rebecca Klaren
- 2002–2003: J. Derrick Price
- 2001–2002: Adria W. Conklin
- 1999–2001: Heather M. Morlang
