= Juan F. Vasquez =

American judge (born 1948)

Juan Vasquez
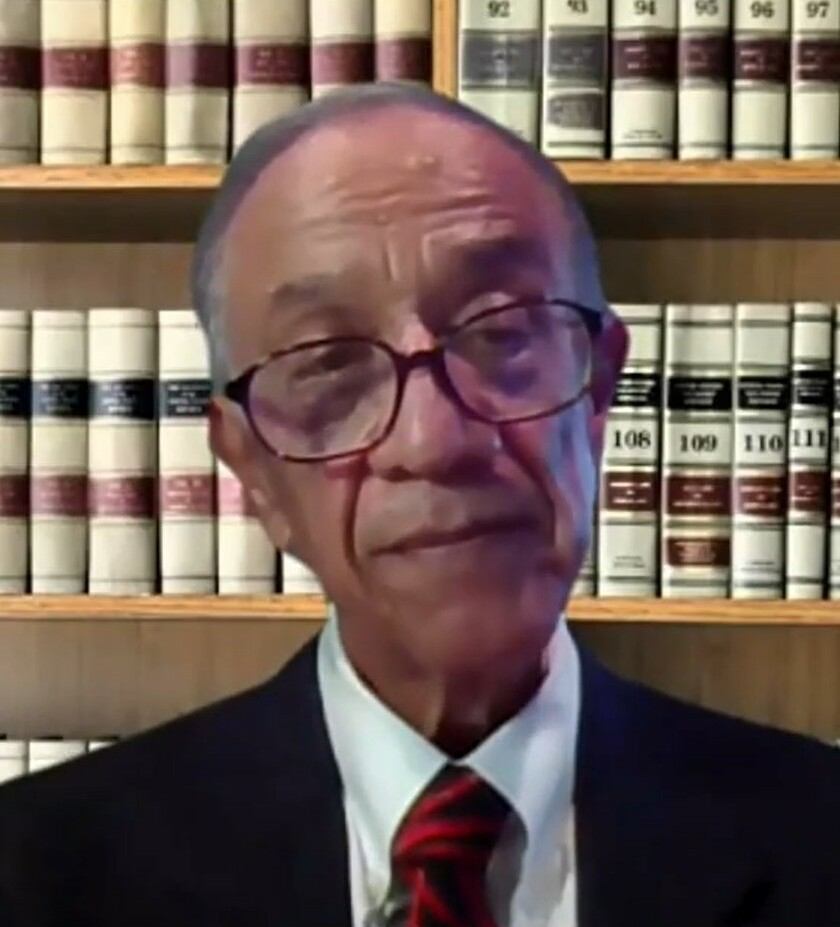
- Vasquez in 2021

Senior Judge of the United States Tax Court
- Incumbent
- Assumed office June 24, 2018

Judge of the United States Tax Court
- In office October 13, 2011 – June 24, 2018
- Appointed by: Barack Obama
- Preceded by: Himself
- Succeeded by: Travis A. Greaves
- In office May 1, 1995 – April 30, 2010
- Appointed by: Bill Clinton
- Preceded by: Edna G. Parker
- Succeeded by: Himself

Personal details
- Born: June 24, 1948 (age 77); San Antonio, Texas, U.S.
- Education: University of Texas at Austin (BBA); University of Houston (JD); New York University (LLM)

Juan Flores Vasquez (born June 24, 1948) is an American lawyer who serves as a senior judge of the United States Tax Court.

== Early life and education ==
Vasquez attended Fox Tech High School and San Antonio Junior College, where he studied Data Processing. He received a Bachelor of Business Administration in Accounting from the University of Texas at Austin in 1972. After working for two years as an accountant at Coopers and Lybrand, he attended one year of law school at the State University of New York in Buffalo, ultimately earning his Juris Doctor from the University of Houston Law Center in 1977. Vasquez earned a Master of Laws in Taxation from New York University School of Law in 1978. He is also a certified public accountant.

After serving as trial attorney for the Internal Revenue Service from 1978 to 1982, Vasquez became a partner in the law firm of Leighton, Hood and Vasquez from 1982 to 1987, and had a private practice as a tax lawyer in San Antonio from 1987 to 1995.

Vasquez has served as an adjunct professor at the University of Houston Law Center, where he teaches tax controversy and litigation.

== Judicial career ==
=== Tax Court ===
Vasquez was appointed by President Bill Clinton as Judge, United States Tax Court, on May 1, 1995, for a term ending April 30, 2010. On August 5, 2010, Judge Vasquez was nominated for reappointment by President Barack Obama, but the United States Senate failed to act on the nomination. Vasquez entered senior status on May 1, 2010, and remained on senior status while awaiting Senate confirmation of his nomination for reappointment. President Obama resubmitted the nomination on January 26, 2011. Vasquez was reconfirmed on October 13, 2011, for a term ending October 12, 2026. He assumed senior status on June 24, 2018.

== Admissions and activities ==
- Admitted to State Bar of Texas, 1977.
- Certified in Tax Law by Texas Board of Legal Specialization, 1984.
- Certified Public Accountant Certificate from Texas, 1976, and California, 1974.
- Admitted to United States District Court, Southern District of Texas, 1982, and Western District of Texas, 1985, U.S. Court of Appeals for the Fifth Circuit, 1982.
- Member of American Bar Association, Tax Section; Texas State Bar, Tax and Probate Section; Fellow of Texas and San Antonio Bar Foundations.
- Mexican American Bar Association (MABA) of San Antonio (Treasurer); Houston MABA; Texas MABA (Treasurer)
- National Association of Hispanic CPA's; San Antonio Chapter (founding member)
- College of State Bar of Texas
- Hispanic Bar Association of the District of Columbia
- member of Greater Austin Tax Litigation Association
- served on Austin Internal Revenue Service District Director's Practitioner Liaison Committee, 1990–91, chairman, 1991.

== See also ==
- List of Hispanic and Latino American jurists

== Notes ==
Legal offices
Preceded by Edna G. Parker	Judge of the United States Tax Court; 1995–2010	Succeeded by Himself
Preceded by Himself	Judge of the United States Tax Court; 2011–2018	Succeeded by Travis A. Greaves
