= Travis A. Greaves =

American judge (born 1983)

Travis Greaves
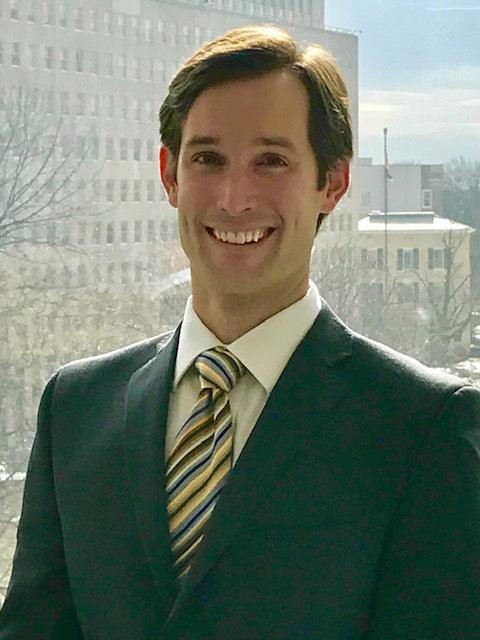

Judge of the United States Tax Court
- Incumbent
- Assumed office March 9, 2020
- Appointed by: Donald Trump
- Preceded by: Juan F. Vasquez

Personal details
- Born: Travis Austin Greaves; 1983 (age 41–42) Odessa, Texas, U.S.
- Education: University of Tennessee (BA); South Texas College of Law (JD); Georgetown University (LLM)

Travis Austin Greaves (born 1983) is an American lawyer who serves as a judge of the United States Tax Court.

== Education ==
Greaves received his Bachelor of Arts from the University of Tennessee, his Juris Doctor, cum laude, from the South Texas College of Law, and a Master of Laws in taxation, with distinction, from the Georgetown University Law Center.

== Legal and academic career ==
Greaves was previously a partner at Greaves & Wu, LLP, in Washington, D.C. He also served as an adjunct professor at Georgetown University Law Center and as an attorney advisor at the U.S. Tax Court. Prior to his judicial appointment, he served as the Deputy Assistant Attorney General for Appellate and Review in the U.S. Department of Justice's Tax Division.

== Tax Court service ==
On August 28, 2018, President Donald Trump nominated Greaves to serve as a Judge of the United States Tax Court. He was nominated to the seat vacated by Juan F. Vasquez, who assumed senior status on June 24, 2018. On January 3, 2019, his nomination was returned to the President under Rule XXXI, Paragraph 6 of the United States Senate.

On February 6, 2019, his re-nomination was sent to the Senate. On July 24, 2019, a hearing on his nomination was held before the Senate Finance Committee. On July 31, 2019, his nomination was unanimously reported favorably by the Senate Finance Committee. On February 25, 2020, the Senate invoked cloture on his nomination by a 91–5 vote. On February 27, 2020, his nomination was confirmed by a 85–3 vote. He was sworn in on March 9, 2020 for a term ending March 8, 2035.

Legal offices
Preceded by Juan F. Vasquez	Judge of the United States Tax Court; 2020–present	Incumbent
