= Houston Law Review =

- Language: English
- Edited by: Ryan Dailey

Publication details
- History: 1963–present
- Publisher: Joe Christensen, Inc. (USA)
- Frequency: 5 issues/year

Standard abbreviations
- Bluebook: Hous. L. Rev.
- ISO 4: Houst. Law Rev.

Indexing
- ISSN: 0018-6694
- OCLC no.: 818988478

Links
- Journal homepage

The Houston Law Review is a law review published by the University of Houston Law Center. The journal is edited and published by students in one volume, divided into five issues, each academic year. The journal was founded in 1963.

In addition to publishing scholarship from students and professionals, the Houston Law Review hosts the Frankel Lecture Series which features notable speakers. The law review also hosts an annual symposium, the proceeds of which are published in the journal.

== History ==
Newell Blakely served as dean of the University of Houston Law Center from 1956 to 1965. During his deanship, he sought to remold the law school into an institution that used "Darwinian selection" to "[flunk] out half the class to identify those who were worthy to graduate." Faculty at his institution were not expected to publish, and he saw little value in having a law review promoting scholarly publications. Students, however, saw things differently and with the support of prestigious members of the faculty - including A.A.White, the founding dean of the law school - started a petition to publish a law review. In 1962, Blakely agreed to their request provided the students cover all the start-up costs. The first organizational meeting of the Houston Law Review took place on January 11, 1963.

One early challenge faced by the Law Review was in attracting established scholars to publish in a brand new legal journal that had no prior reputation. During its first several years, most of the articles were written by local practitioners; the few academic contributions were provided by professors at the University of Houston. Another challenge was a small editorial board in which "Members came and went [...]. Some finished their degrees in midyear; others accumulated the hours necessary to take the bar exam, got their licenses, and departed without obtaining a degree at all."

Financial problems also plagued the journal early on. Ray Nimmer, then professor and later dean at the law school, took an interest in promoting the financial stability of the Law Review during the 1980s and "told the student editors straight-up: develop yourselves other, sustainable sources of funding", which they did by self-publishing legal manuals.

== Impact and ranking ==
The Houston Law Review is generally ranked towards the middle of the top 100 US law reviews. In 2018 they were ranked #66 by the Washington and Lee Law School Journal Rankings. A separate aggregate ranking system placed the law review at #53 in 2019.

== Other journals ==
The University of Houston Law Center publishes a number of legal journals including the Houston Journal of Health Law & Policy and the Houston Journal of International Law. The Law Review is considered the flagship journal.
