= Texas Dow Employees Credit Union =

Credit union based in Houston, Texas, United States

- Type: Credit union
- Industry: Financial services
- Founded: 1955
- Headquarters: Houston, Texas
- Number of locations: 38
- Area served: Texas
- Key people: Isaac Johnson (President & CEO)
- Products: Savings; Checking; Credit cards; Loans; CDs; IRAs; Mortgages; Insurance; Wealth Management
- Number of employees: 896 (April 2022)
- Website: www.tdecu.org

Texas Dow Employees Credit Union (TDECU) is a credit union based in Houston, Texas, and founded in Lake Jackson. TDECU is the largest Houston-area credit union, and fourth largest in the state of Texas, with over 399,000 members and assets of over $5.1 billion. In 2014, they purchased the naming rights to the University of Houston Cougars football stadium, TDECU Stadium.

== History ==
The Texas Dow Employees Credit Union was founded by employees of Dow Chemical Company in December 1954, receiving its charter from the State Attorney General that month. Its first organizational meeting was held in the Freeport Junior High auditorium in Freeport, Texas, on January 3, 1955, with memberships available for deposits of up to five dollars. Membership was initially limited to Dow and Ethyl-Dow employees. In 1958, the credit union had 780 members and assets totaling $210,000; by 1971, it had a reported 8,500 members, with assets over $7.5 million.

In December 2011, the company created TDECU Holdings to manage its subsidiaries: TDECU Insurance, TDECU Wealth Advisors, TDECU Real Estate and Century Oaks Title.

Timothy D. Belton was named president and CEO of TDECU Holdings. In October 2012, Stephanie Sherrodd was appointed as TDECU's new president and CEO, replacing Edward Speed, who had served as CEO since 2003. In June 2021, Isaac Johnson was named President & CEO.

== TDECU Stadium ==
In July 2014, the University of Houston and TDECU announced a naming rights partnership to rebrand the Houston Cougars' new 40,000-seat football stadium as TDECU Stadium, with TDECU paying $15 million over 10 years for the rights. The original deal ran through June 16, 2024 and at the time was the third-most lucrative naming rights deal among NCAA facilities. In 2022, TDECU extended its naming rights to the stadium through at least 2034 as part of a partnership worth more than $20 million. It was the first major corporate sports venue sponsorship for TDECU, which previously had deals with the Texas Bowl game, Sugar Land Skeeters of the independent Atlantic League of Professional Baseball, and the Houston Livestock Show and Rodeo.

== Locations ==
TDECU is headquartered in Houston and has locations in Lake Jackson and elsewhere within Texas, including Angleton, Bay City, Baytown, Brazoria, Cuero, Dallas, Edna, Fort Worth, Freeport, Hallettsville, Houston, Katy, Missouri City, Pasadena, Pearland, Port Lavaca, Rosenberg, Shenandoah, Sugar Land, Texas City, Victoria and Yoakum.

== Services ==
TDECU provides the following services:

- Checking and savings accounts
- Credit cards
- IRAs
- Money management
- Mortgage loans and related services
- Auto, home equity and personal loans
- Life, health, auto and homeowners insurance
- Liability insurance and workers compensation
- Investments and Financial Planning

== Mergers and acquisitions ==
Some of TDECU's mergers and acquisitions include: a 2011 merger with Bluebonnet Credit Union of Houston; the 2012 acquisitions of Associated Insurance Agency in Houston, Assurance Insurance Agency of Bellville, Texas, and Burridge Insurance Agency of Angleton, Texas; the July 2013 acquisition of 7 branches from Hancock Bank; the 2014 acquisition of 1,200-member employee credit union of FMC Technologies; and a 2014 partnership with James E. Bashaw & Co. to help build TDECU's wealth management business.

On October 22, 2025, TDECU and Smart Financial Credit Union announced plans to merge, with TDECU as the surviving credit union and its chief executive, Isaac Johnson, leading the combined organization. Regulators approved the merger on July 22, 2026, and Smart Financial members approved it on September 28, 2026.
