= Cathy Cochran =

American judge (1944–2021)

Place 9 Judge of the Texas Court of Criminal Appeals
- In office September 28, 2001 – January 7, 2015
- Preceded by: Verla Sue Holland
- Succeeded by: David Newell

Personal details
- Born: November 11, 1944 Los Angeles County, California, US
- Died: February 7, 2021 (aged 76)
- Party: Republican
- Spouse(s): David Cochran (née Herasimchuk)
- Children: 2
- Education: Stanford University (BA); University of Houston (JD)

Cathleen Cochran Herasimchuk (née Cochran; November 11, 1944 – February 7, 2021), was a judge of the Texas Court of Criminal Appeals. A resident of Austin, Texas, she was initially appointed to the court on September 28, 2001 by Governor Rick Perry and elected by Texas voters in 2002 and 2008. She did not seek re-election to the bench in 2014 and was succeeded in her Place 9 seat by her fellow Republican, David Newell of Houston. She died on February 7, 2021.

== Education and marriage ==
Born in Los Angeles County, California, Cochran earned her Bachelor of Arts degree in English with distinction from Stanford University in 1966. That same year, she married David Herasimchuk, whom she had met at Stanford. Initially she took his surname of Herasimchuk as her married name. In October 2001, however, at the urging of her husband and friends, she changed back to her maiden name of Cochran in order to run for re-election to the Court because the name was easier to pronounce; at that point her husband changed his name to Cochran, too. They have two daughters and resided in Austin, Texas.

After their marriage, the couple moved from California to Peru, where David's parents lived. They then moved to Boston, so he could attend Harvard Business School. After David graduated, he worked for Global Marine, an offshore drilling company, so they moved to Los Angeles, Houston in 1976, Venezuela in 1978, and back to Houston in 1980.

== Legal and academic career ==
After returning to Houston, Cochran enrolled in law school and earned her Juris Doctor degree with summa cum laude honors in 1984 from the University of Houston Law Center, where she served as editor-in-chief of the law review, was elected to both the Order of the Coif and the Order of the Barons honor societies, and won the school's Distinguished Service Award.

Serving as a professor in evidence, criminal law, and criminal procedure at the University of Houston Law Center, Cochran won the Professor of the Year award twice from the Order of the Barons and once from the student bar association. She also served as general editor of the 2nd edition of the Texas Rules of Evidence Handbook, published in 1993, and as author and editor of the 3rd edition, published in 1998.

== Judicial career ==
Cochran served as of counsel to Rusty Hardin & Associates in Houston until leaving to serve as an assistant district attorney in Harris and Fort Bend counties. She prosecuted forty-five cases and authored more than two hundred appellate briefs.

Serving as Director of Criminal Justice in the office of Governor George W. Bush, Cochran advised Bush on criminal justice policy and judicial appointments. She formed the Advisory Committee to Revise Code of Criminal Procedure that organized a complete rewriting of the Texas Code of Criminal Procedure.

Cochran placed third in the Republican primary election for the Court of Criminal Appeals in 1994. She polled 109,897 votes (25.5 percent). Victory in the ensuing runoff election went to Sharon Keller, the presiding judge over that court since 2001.

Cochran was initially appointed to the Court of Criminal Appeals in 2001 by Governor Perry. In 2002, she won the support of 63 percent of Texas voters for a full six-year term in the office. The Criminal Justice Section of the Texas State Bar named her Jurist of the Year in 2006. In 2008, 82 percent of Texas voters supported her re-election to another six-year term.

Legal offices
Preceded by Verla Sue Holland	Judge of the Texas Court of Criminal Appeals; Place 9; 2001–2015	Succeeded by David Newell
