= Raymond Nimmer =

American lawyer

Raymond Theodore Nimmer (1944–2018) was an attorney and former dean of the University of Houston Law Center in Houston, Texas.

== Biography ==
=== Education and early life ===
Raymond T. Nimmer was born in Illinois May 2, 1944. He received a B.A. in mathematics in 1966 from Valparaiso University. He received a J.D. degree which was awarded with distinction in 1968 from Valparaiso University Law School

=== Career ===
Nimmer’s field of expertise was in intellectual property law. After graduating from law school in 1968, he worked as a Research Attorney at the American Bar Foundation from 1968 to 1975.

In 1975, Nimmer began teaching at the University of Houston Law Center. He was named associate dean in 1978. In 2006, he became dean of the law school. During his law school career, he took particular interest in making the Houston Law Review financially stable. He stepped down as dean in early 2013 citing health concerns and a feeling that he had accomplished the goals he had set out in his deanship. He was the Leonard H. Childs Professor of Law at Houston. He was also a Distinguished Chair in Residence at Universidad Catholica in Lisbon, Portugal.

Nimmer served of counsel at two Houston law firms: at Sheinfeld, Maley and Kay from 1985 to 1991 and at Weil, Gotshal & Manges from 1992 to 1999. He was admitted to the Texas Bar in March, 1984. Nimmer was also a member of the Illinois Bar and the Supreme Court Bar.

Nimmer was the author of twenty books and many law articles. Professor Nimmer was a frequent speaker in the United States and overseas in the areas of intellectual property, business and technology law. On September 28, 2006, he was the keynote speaker to the Singapore Management University School of Law, held in conjunction with Singapore Academy of Law held at the Supreme Court auditorium in Singapore.

=== Death ===
Nimmer died January 24, 2018, in Houston, Texas.

== Miscellaneous ==
Ray Nimmer was not related to David and Melville Nimmer of Nimmer on Copyright.

== Awards ==
- Recipient, Faculty Services Award, University of Houston 2004
- Recipient, Best New Book in Law, Association of American Publishers 1985 (Law of Computer Technology)
- Third National Prize, Nathan Burkham Copyright competition, 1968
