= Houston Journal of International Law =

- Discipline: International Law
- Language: English

Publication details
- History: 1978–present
- Publisher: University of Houston Law Center (United States)
- Frequency: Triannual

Standard abbreviations
- Bluebook: Hous. J. Int'l L.
- ISO 4: Houst. J. Int. Law

Indexing
- ISSN: 0194-1879
- LCCN: 79643854
- OCLC no.: 53456119

The Houston Journal of International Law (HJIL) is a triannual student-edited law journal published by the University of Houston Law Center. It was established in 1978.
