= David Newell (judge) =

American judge

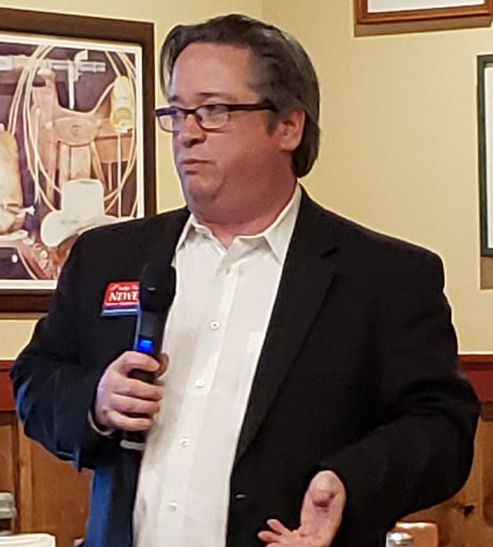
- Newell in 2019

Judge of the Texas Court of Criminal Appeals
- Incumbent
- Assumed office January 1, 2015
- Preceded by: Cathy Cochran
- Succeeded by: Holly E. Taylor (elect)

Personal details
- Born: David Christopher Newell; June 9, 1971 (age 55)
- Party: Republican
- Spouse: Shayne Hurst
- Education: University of Houston (BA); University of Texas, Austin (JD)

David Christopher Newell (born June 9, 1971) is an American judge, who serves on the Texas Court of Criminal Appeals. A resident of Houston, Newell was elected to the court in 2014 to succeed the retiring Place 9 Judge Cathy Cochran.

== Biography ==
Newell the son of a Navy father, was born in the Bethesda, Maryland, but grew up in Sugar Land, Texas.

Newell graduated from the University of Houston in 1993, and from the University of Texas School of Law in Austin in 1997.

Legal offices
Preceded by Cathy Cochran	Judge of the Texas Court of Criminal Appeals; 2015–present	Succeeded by Holly E. Taylor; Elect
