= List of Pi Kappa Alpha members =

This is a list of notable alumni of the Pi Kappa Alpha fraternity

== Business ==
Name	Original chapter	Notability	Ref.
Bill Bain	Sigma	Founder, Bain and Company	
Brian Kevin Turner	Epsilon Omega	Chief Operating Officer of Microsoft	
Charles O. "Chad" Holliday	Zeta	Chairman, Bank of America; CEO, DuPont	
Howard Marks	Beta Pi	Co-Founder and Co-Chairman, Oaktree Capital Management	
Jeff Taylor	Theta Mu	Founder, Monster.com	
Mark Russinovich	Beta Sigma	CTO, Microsoft Azure	
P. Roy Vagelos	Beta Pi	CEO, President, Chairman, Merck & Co.; Chairman, Regeneron Pharmaceuticals; Trustee, University of Pennsylvania	
Stephen Covey	Alpha Tau	Author, "The Seven Habits of Highly Effective People"; business professor, University of Utah	
Gil Amelio	Alpha Delta	Former CEO, Apple	

== Government and politics ==
Name	Original chapter	Notability	Ref.
LeRoy H. Anderson	Gamma Kappa	U.S. Representative from Montana	
Charles O. Andrews	Alpha Eta	U.S. Senator from Florida	
Dick Armey	Jamestown College	U.S. Representative and Majority Leader from Texas	
Ibra C. Blackwood	Nu	97th Governor of South Carolina	
Albert B. "Happy" Chandler	Kappa	44th and 49th Governor of Kentucky, U.S. Senator from Kentucky	
J. Bayard Clark	Beta	U.S. Representative from North Carolina	
Earle C. Clements	Omega	47th Governor of Kentucky, U.S. Senator from Kentucky	
Thad Cochran	Gamma Iota	U.S. Senator from Mississippi	
William M. Colmer	Alpha Iota	U.S. Representative from Mississippi	
Charlie Crist	Delta Lambda	44th Governor of Florida	
Glenn Cunningham	Delta Chi	U.S. Representative from Nebraska, Mayor of Omaha, Nebraska	
Everett Dirksen	Delta Sigma	U.S. Senator from Illinois	
William C. Dixon	Beta Tau	Justice of the Ohio Supreme Court	
Doug Ducey	Delta Tau	23rd Governor of Arizona	
A. M. Edwards	Omega	Secretary of Guam from 1960 to 1961	
John W. Fishburne	Pi	U.S. Representative from Virginia	
John Nance Garner	Sigma	39th Speaker of the House of Representatives, 32nd Vice President of the United States	
Bobby Harrell	Xi	59th Speaker of the South Carolina House of Representatives	
Leo Hoegh	Gamma Nu	33rd Governor of Iowa	
Harry R. Houston	Iota	Speaker of the Virginia House of Delegates	
Robert Howden	Beta Mu	Secretary of State of Texas	
Jon Kyl	Gamma Delta	U.S. Senator from Arizona	
Nicholas Lampson	Epsilon Kappa	U.S. Representative from Texas	
John Augustine Marshall	Alpha	Judge of the United States District Court for the District of Utah	
Clarence W. Meadows	Pi	22nd Governor of West Virginia	
Harvey Morgan	Iota	Member of the Virginia House of Delegates	
W. Robert Pearson	Sigma	Former United States Ambassador to Turkey	
Edward A. Pease	Delta Xi	Former U.S. Congressman from Indiana	
Walter Garrett Riddick	Pi	Judge for the United States Court of Appeals for the Eighth Circuit	
Pat Roberts	Alpha Omega	U.S. Senator from Kansas	
Absalom Willis Robertson	Omicron	U.S. Senator from Virginia	
Karl Rove	Alpha Tau	White House Chief of Staff under President George W. Bush	
Pete Sessions	Alpha Omicron	U.S. Representative from Texas	
John Sparkman	Gamma Alpha	U.S. Senator from Alabama, 1952 Democratic nominee for Vice President of the United States	
Strom Thurmond	Eta Alpha	103rd Governor of South Carolina, U.S. Senator from South Carolina	
Kenneth H. Tuggle	Omega	39th Lieutenant Governor of Kentucky	
Claude R. Wickard	Beta Phi	12th United States Secretary of Agriculture	
Brian K. Zahra	Delta Nu	Justice of the Michigan Supreme Court	

== Military ==
Name	Original chapter	Notability	Ref.
Courtney Hodges	Psi	Commander of the First United States Army, World War II	
Richard J. Seitz	Alpha Omega	Lieutenant General, United States Army	
Louis H. Wilson, Jr.	Alpha Iota	26th Commandant of the Marine Corps, Medal of Honor recipient	
James A. Winnefeld, Jr.	Alpha Delta	Vice Chairman of the Joint Chiefs of Staff	
Philip M. Breedlove	Alpha Delta	Commander, United States European Command	

== Education ==
Name	Original chapter	Notability	Ref.
John A. DiBiaggio	Beta Tau	President of Tufts University, Michigan State University, and the University of Connecticut	
Walter L. Fleming	Upsilon	American historian of the South and Reconstruction	
E. Gordon Gee	Alpha Tau	President of West Virginia University	
Kenneth T. Jackson	Delta Zeta	Jacques Barzun Professor of History and the Social Sciences at Columbia University, Editor-in-Chief of The Encyclopedia of New York City	
John Lloyd Newcomb	Gamma	2nd President of the University of Virginia	
Samuel H. Smith	Alpha Sigma	Former president of Washington State University (1985–2000)	

== News, Art, and Entertainment ==
Name	Original chapter	Notability	Ref.
Jason Alkire	Epsilon Eta	Fashion Designer Haus Alkire	
Erik Courtney	Iota Lambda	Bravo TV personality Newlyweds: The First Year	
John Currence	Iota	Celebrity Chef Top Chef Masters	
Rick Dees	Tau	Host of The Rick Dees Weekly Top 40 Countdown	
Mason Gamble	Iota Pi	Actor Dennis the Menace	
Clifton Hyde	Alpha Iota	Musician/Composer Blue Man Group	
Ted Koppel	Alpha Chi	Nightline Anchor ABC	
Serge F. Kovaleski	Gamma	Pulitzer Prize-winning reporter for the New York Times	
Tim McGraw	Eta Omicron	American country singer and actor	
Ken Ober	Theta Mu	Game Show Host	
Jim Parsons	Epsilon Eta	Actor The Big Bang Theory	
Greg Pitts	Zeta Pi	Actor Movie Office Space	
Jeremy Piven	Delta Omicron	Actor Entourage	
Jon Stewart	Gamma	Host of The Daily Show (1999–2015)	
Eric Stonestreet	Alpha Omega	Actor Modern Family	
Brian Tyler	Iota Pi	Composer Iron Man 3, The Expendables	
Scott Van Pelt	Delta Psi	Anchor ESPN	
Matt Winer	Alpha Nu	Anchor Turner Sports, formerly SportsCenter	
Morgan Woodward	Beta Mu	Actor Dallas, Cool Hand Luke	
Matt Gerald	Beta Pi	Actor Avatar (2009 film)	

== Religion ==
Name	Original chapter	Notability	Ref.
Richard L. Evans	Alpha Tau	Member of the Quorum of the Twelve Apostles in the Church of Jesus Christ of Latter-day Saints	
Robert L. McLeod	Beta	Pastor and U.S. Navy chaplain; president of Centre College	
Cecil O. Samuelson	Alpha Tau	Former member of the presidency of the Quorum of the Seventy in the Church of Jesus Christ of Latter-day Saints and former president of BYU	

== Sports ==
Name	Original chapter	Notability	Ref.
Reid Stainbrook	Alpha Omega	NFL Quarterback, Kansas City Chiefs, Indianaopolis Colts	
Lance Alworth	Alpha Zeta	Professional Football Player, San Diego Chargers, Dallas Cowboys	
Matt Ammendola	Gamma Chi	NFL Kicker, New York Jets	
Kent Bazemore	Zeta Iota	Professional Basketball Player, Atlanta Hawks	
Bobby Bowden	Alpha Pi	Former Head Football Coach Florida State	
Pat Bowlen	Beta Omicron	Owner, Denver Broncos	
Bob Bowman	Delta Lambda	CEO North Baltimore Aquatic Club	
Marvin O. Bridges	Rho	All-Southern college football player, minor league baseball player, and head coach for University of Florida	
Chad Clifton	Epsilon Sigma	Offensive Tackle, Green Bay Packers	
Matt Doherty	Beta Zeta	Former head men's basketball coach at Southern Methodist University	
Guy Dennis	Alpha Eta	Former professional football player for Cincinnati Bengals and Detroit Lions	
Sam Ewing	Zeta	Former professional baseball player for Chicago White Sox and Toronto Blue Jays	
Jeff Feagles	Gamma Omega	NFL Kicker, University of Miami	
Jimbo Fisher	Delta Lambda	Head Football Coach Texas A&M	
Gus Frerotte	Gamma Upsilon	Quarterback NFL	
Jason Curtis Fox	Gamma Omega	NFL Lineman, University of Miami	
Jamie Gard	Beta Upsilon	Track and Field star, University of Colorado	
Walter Gilbert	Upsilon	College Football Hall of Fame inductee	
Horace Grant	Eta Alpha	Professional Basketball Player	
Hubert Green	Delta Lambda	Professional Golfer	
Blake Grupe	Delta Theta	Placekicker, New Orleans Saints	
Todd Hays	Gamma Upsilon	Bobsledder and Olympic Silver Medalist	
Bob Humphreys	Iota	Professional Baseball Player	
Jeff Ireland	Theta Nu	General Manager, Miami Dolphins	
EJ Manuel	Delta Lambda	Quarterback Buffalo Bills	
Colin McCarthy	Gamma Omega	NFL Linebacker, University of Miami	
Bill McCartney	University of Missouri	Former football coach for CU-Boulder, founder of Promise Keepers ministry	
Chris Myers	Gamma Omega	NFL Lineman, University of Miami	
Tom Miller	Iota	NFL Player, Assistant GM of the Green Bay Packers, Member of the Packer's Hall of Fame	
Kyle Orton	Beta Phi	Quarterback NFL	
Steve Prefontaine	Gamma Pi	Track and Field Hall of Fame	
Howard Schnellenberger	Gamma Omega	Football coach (winner of 1983 NCAA National Championship), University of Miami	
Frank Sinkwich	Alpha Mu	Heisman Trophy Winner, University of Georgia	
James Southerland	Alpha Chi	NBA Forward	
Kevin Stallings	Beta Phi	Head Basketball Coach, Vanderbilt University	
Gino Torretta	Gamma Omega	Heisman Trophy Winner, University of Miami	
Jordan Travis	Gamma Delta	NFL Quarterback, New York Jets	
Eric Winston	Gamma Omega	NFL Lineman, NCAA All-American University of Miami	
Michael Oliveira	Kappa Gamma	Professional Boxer	
William Richard Winter	Delta Iota	HOF football player, coach	

== Miscellaneous ==
Name / Original chapter / Notability / Ref.; Tex Watson / Epsilon Delta / Murderer and central member of the notorious Manson Family
