= Alkire =

Alkire is a surname. Notable people with the surname include:

- Darr H. Alkire (1903–1977), United States Air Force general
- Elbern Alkire (1907–1981), American guitarist
- Jason Alkire, American fashion designer
- Sabina Alkire (* 1969), German academic

== See also ==
- Haus Alkire, an American fashion label
- Alkire House, a historic house in Westerville, Ohio, United States
