= F. Ralph Gervers =

American Vaudeville Impresario and Film Producer (1865–1972)

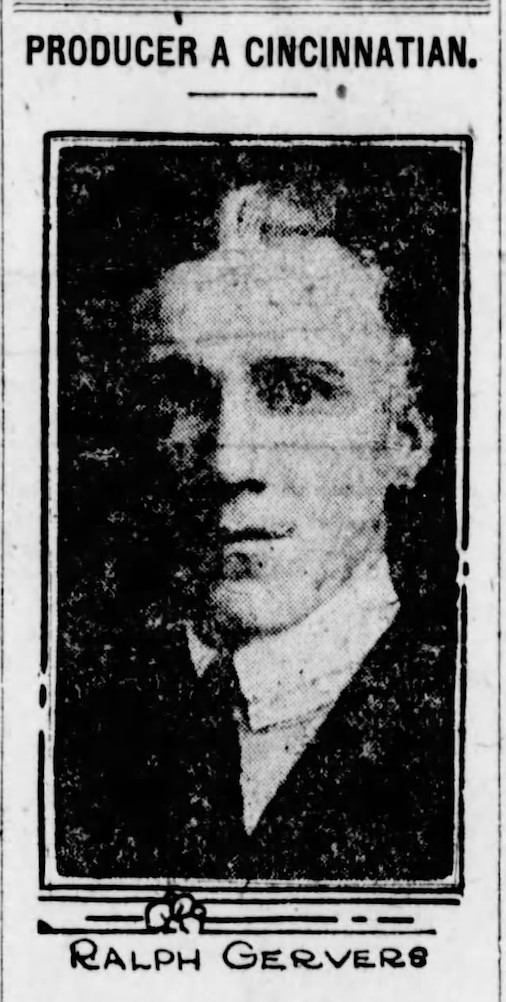
F Ralph Gervers photo

Frank Ralph Gervers (November 19, 1865 – February 22, 1972), also known as F. Ralph Gervers, was an American impresario, talent manager, publicist, and variety producer who worked in American vaudeville and the theater circuit in the early twentieth century. As vaudeville began to decline, he entered the motion picture industry, where he worked as a film producer and was employed by Columbia Pictures. He was known as the husband and manager of vaudeville performer Signe Paterson, who achieved fame as one half of the duo Hale and Paterson. In later years, he worked as a newspaper publisher in Tampa, where he became a civic leader until his death.

== Early life ==
Gervers was born in Cincinnati, Ohio on November 19, 1895. Gervers worked as an usher at B.F. Keith's Cincinnati Playhouse in his youth, where he claimed to have first discovered a desire to travel. He later began a job with John Robinson's traveling circus. This experience lasted five seasons and honed knowledge and skills he would eventually put to use as a motion picture producer.

== Career ==
Gervers began his career in advertising and publicity for a group of Long Island newspapers, and authored a newspaper column in New York. Gervers worked in advertising and publicity for traveling stage shows, promoting them by running ads in newspapers. For a time, Gervers also worked as Director of Exploitation for Columbia Pictures. In 1919, while working as publicity director for Loew's Penn Theater in Pittsburgh, Gervers produced a touring stage show called The Woman Untamed, starring vaudeville dancer Signe Paterson. Following its tour, Paterson named Gervers as her manager. Together, they are credited with producing the first large-scale stage presentation running at motion picture theaters.

As Paterson's fame grew over the next two years, Gervers continued to produce and publicize her stage shows, including the increasingly popular The Woman Untamed. Other shows produced by Gervers included Doraldina, The Hawaiian Musical Revue, and The Royal Hawaiian Orchestra, as well as Columbus and the Discovery of America.

After marrying Paterson and starting a family together, they moved to Pittsburgh. There, Gervers began working for the Penn Theater.

In 1934, Gervers and his family moved to Tampa, where he became heavily involved with the community. He published two newspapers in the 1940s and 1950s, the Port Tampa Beacon and Ruskin Planter, while also using skills honed in vaudeville and motion pictures to do advertising and publicity work for the city.

In 1939, he spearheaded a construction and beautification program for Tampa Beach at Sulfur Springs with the Peninsular Distributing Corp. In 1946, he organized a civic organization for the betterment of Tampa known as the Palma Ceia Lions Club. He was elected vice president of the Florida Press Association in 1952 and re-elected in 1954.

In 1958, Gervers added two Everglades newspapers, taking over editorial and management duties for the Hendry County News and the Glades County Democrat.

== Personal life ==
On July 18, 1921, Gervers married vaudeville dancer Signe Paterson at Saint Malachy's Roman Catholic Church in New York. Gervers and Paterson moved to Pittsburgh in 1928, before moving to Tampa, Florida in 1934.

Together with Paterson, he had two children, a son named James A. Gervers and a son named Albert Gervers. Through his son James, he is the grandfather of filmmaker Erik Courtney.

== Death ==
Gervers died February 22, 1972, in Tampa, Florida. He was interred at Sylvan Abbey Memorial Park, in Clearwater, Florida.
