= Angel Chang =

American fashion designer

- Education: Columbia University; Barnard College
- Label: ANGEL CHANG
- Awards: Cartier Women's Initiative Award, 2007; Ecco Domani Fashion Foundation Award, 2007

Angel Chang is an American fashion designer and early pioneer in the cross-over between fashion and technology. She received the Ecco Domani Fashion Foundation Award and Cartier Women's Initiative Award in 2007. The revival of endangered traditional Chinese hand-craftsmanship translated into modern designs is the philosophy behind her current womenswear label ANGEL CHANG.

== Early life and education ==
Chang was born and raised in Muncie, Indiana, and is of Chinese descent. Her parents were born in Shanghai, China, and Fujian, China, and came to the United States in the mid-1950s. As a teenager in Indiana, she wrote a long letter seeking career advice to Anna Sui, who responded by inviting Chang to an internship at her studio in New York City. A year later, Chang moved to New York City to begin her internship at Anna Sui while studying art history at Barnard College. She later trained in the design studios of Marc Jacobs and Viktor & Rolf.

Chang received an M.A. in Modern Art: Critical Studies from Columbia University, where she studied with fashion historians Richard Martin and Valerie Steele. As a graduate student, she published articles in Encyclopedia of Clothing & Fashion and Fashion Theory. She wrote online runway reviews for French Vogue and was a freelance journalist to various fashion magazines. In 2004, she co-founded and was Editor-in-Chief of downtown New York indie quarterly Me Magazine.

== Career ==
Chang began her design career as a Design Assistant for Womenswear at Donna Karan Collection in New York.

Her eponymous collection ANGEL CHANG launched in 2006 in New York and became known for its innovative use of future fabrics like color-changing prints light-up fabrics, and self-heating linings. She was an early pioneer in the cross-over between fashion and technology and received the Ecco Domani Fashion Foundation Award and Cartier Women's Initiative Award within the first year of launching. Chang was also featured in PAPER magazine's 10th Annual "Beautiful People" Issue as one of the top emerging talents influencing the fashion field.

In 2009, Chang appeared as a contestant on The Fashion Show, a design competition reality television show on Bravo network. She was the first contestant on an American reality television show to use Twitter as a real-time live-chat platform to speak directly with TV audiences.

Since 2009, Angel has worked closely with fabric masters in the rural mountain villages of Guizhou Province, China where ethnic minority tribes (Miao, Dong) have maintained 1000-year-old fabric-making traditions using all-natural processes. The Atelier ANGEL CHANG collection (launched in 2013) mixes traditional fabrics with modern silhouettes and is produced with a nearly zero carbon footprint. Its aims are to create employment opportunities in impoverished rural villages and to promote global appreciation for endangered indigenous craftsmanship.

She has designed internationally for luxury fashion brands Donna Karan Collection (New York) and Chloe (Paris), and most recently as Head Designer of Lululemon Lab, the innovation incubator of Lululemon Athletica (Vancouver).

In 2016, she became a TED Resident at TED headquarters in New York. She is taking what she has learned about indigenous crafts and applying that knowledge to make the fashion industry more sustainable.

== Awards ==
- Cartier Women's Initiative Award, 2007
- Ecco Domani Fashion Foundation Award, 2007

== See also ==
- Chinese Americans in New York City
