= Newlywed =

People who have recently entered into a marriage

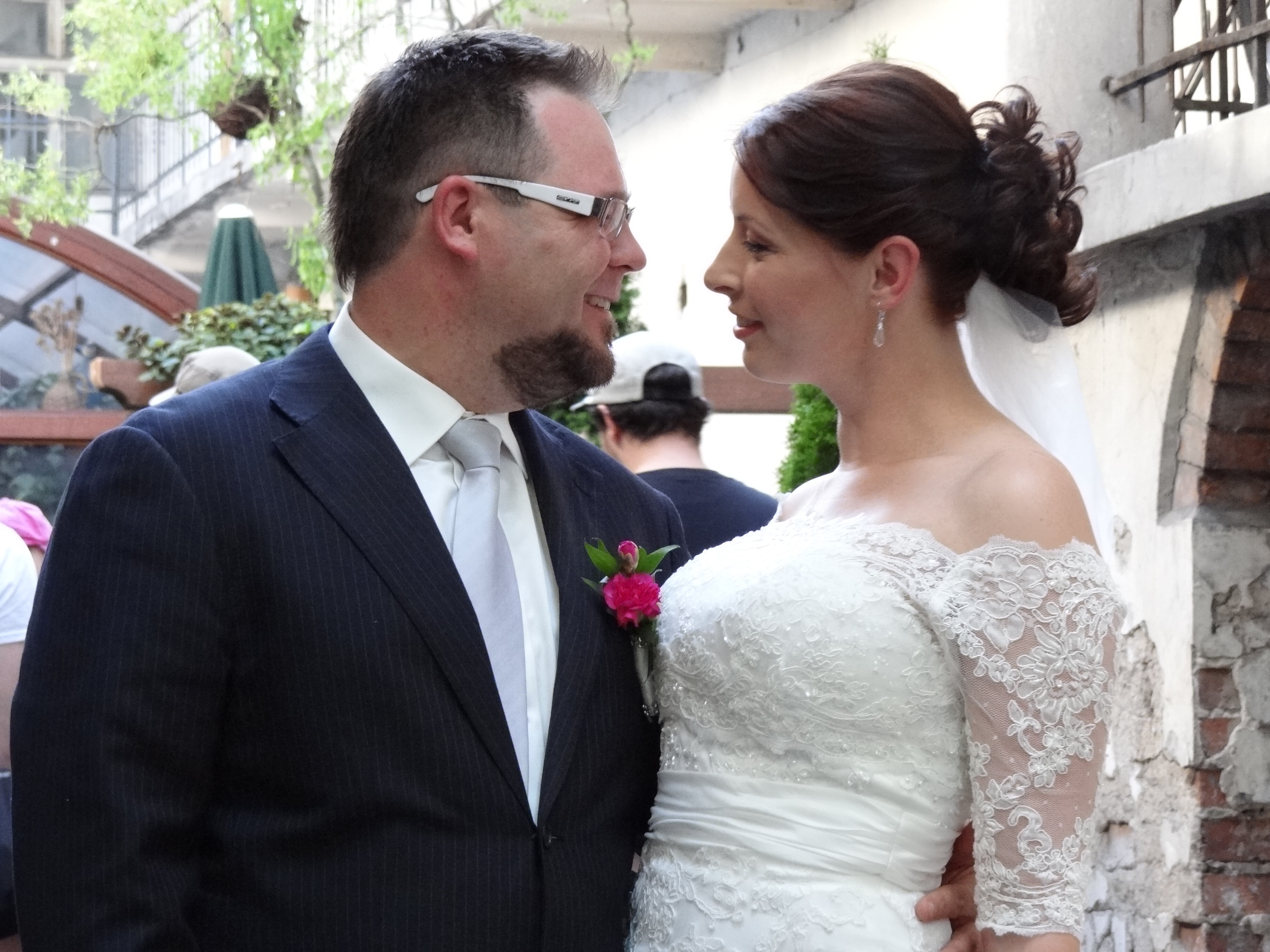
Newlyweds in Kraków, Poland

Newlyweds are people who have recently entered into a marriage. The time frame during which a married couple is considered newlywed varies, but for social science research purposes it may be considered as up to six months into the marriage.

== Happiness and honeymoon ==
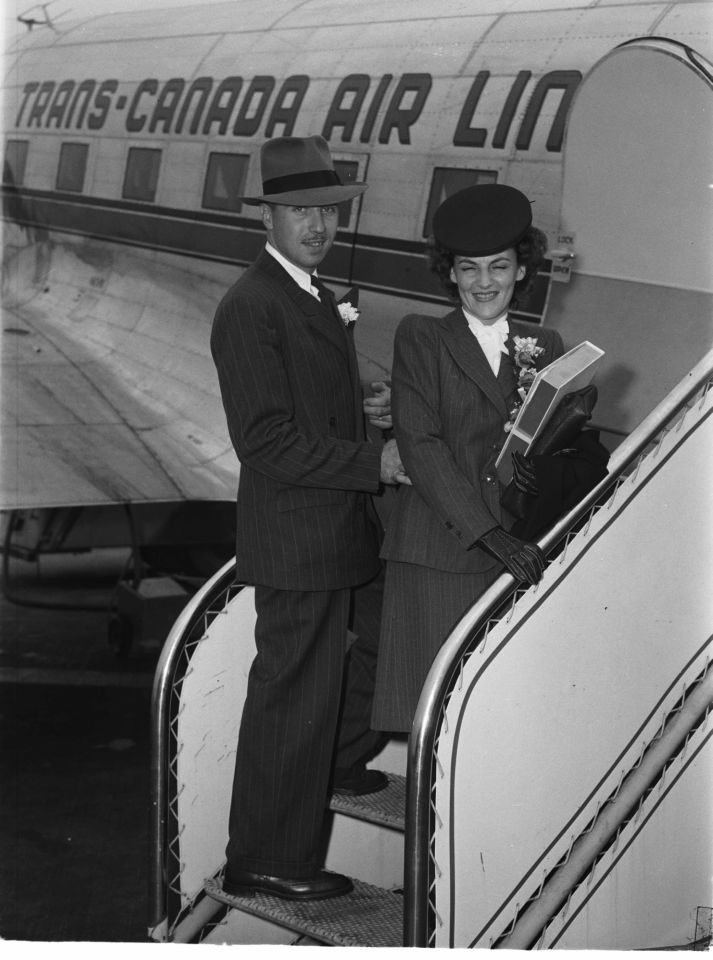
Newlyweds leaving for their honeymoon, boarding a Trans-Canada Air Lines plane, Montreal, 1946

Researchers generally contend that "early in marriage, newly married couples are affectionate, very much in love, and relatively free of excessive conflict, a state that might be called 'blissful harmony'". The "high levels of love and commitment" experienced by newlyweds "are relatively stable during the first year of marriage". The marital relationship (as opposed to other familial relationships, friendships, or work relationships) is the most important relationship in causing happiness in newlyweds. Perhaps counter to expectations or stereotypes, erotic love is not a major factor in the happiness of many newlyweds. Newlyweds experience a "happiness boost" that lasts for the first two years of marriage on average, with happiness levels then returning to pre-marriage levels. Many newlyweds experience feelings of elation, an increase in self-esteem, and a more secure attachment style after the start of their marriage.

Many newlyweds, especially in Western cultures, take a vacation in the immediate wake of the wedding, known as a honeymoon. The honeymoon is part of the wedding ritual in Great Britain and the United States.

== Stress and challenges ==
Newlyweds may face significant stress as they work to integrate their individual lives into a newly combined social, financial, and legal status. This stress can lead to biological alterations, with endocrine changes found in newlyweds who exhibit hostility in laboratory settings. In some cultures, "[n]ewlyweds are expected to earn a living independent of their parents' help", while in others, the new couple are expected to integrate into the household of one of their parents while working to gain the means to establish their own household. Newlyweds' perception of their integration into their new family can be affected by the amount and type of information conveyed to them by their in-laws. Even when newlyweds in the United States report a positive relationship with their spouse's family, they prefer to look for emotional support from their own family, at least in the early years of marriage. Newlyweds may also discover previously unknown conflicts between their own beliefs. Research indicates that "interactions within households, as measured by years married, influence the rate of agreement between the partners", and therefore that "newlyweds are consistently less likely to agree on partisan choice than are older couples". Newlyweds often feel societal pressure to have children early in their marriage; this pressure extends to same-sex newlyweds.

=== Sexual performance ===
Newlyweds may also face sexual performance pressures, particularly in cultures where people are expected to refrain from sexual activity before marriage, and immediately after marriage to begin engaging in regular and mutually satisfying sex. In the Middle Ages, the Church was concerned that newlyweds would become obsessed with their new-found right to engage in sexual activity, to the point that the Church "pronounced that any sexual activity between newlyweds for the first three days was sinful and required absolution and penance". It has been found, however, that "married couples make love quite often during the first year or two, but after that, sexual frequency declines, slowly and steadily, over the years".

=== Older newlyweds ===
Although most newlyweds are relatively young, the status also applies to older people entering into late marriages or second marriages, possibly following a divorce or a period of widowhood. Older couples are sometimes more firmly established financially, but must address considerations such as estate planning (particularly where the spouses have children from previous relationships) and entitlement to government benefits like Medicaid and social security programs.

== In popular culture ==
Some media have focused on newlyweds as characters. Examples include:

- Newlyweds, a 2011 film written and directed by Edward Burns.
- Newlyweds, an Australian sitcom that ran from 1993 to 1994.
- Newlyweds: Nick and Jessica, an American reality television series about Nick Lachey and Jessica Simpson, following them in the first two years of their marriage.
- Newlyweds: The First Year, an American reality documentary television series that premiered on Bravo in 2013, tracking the married life of four recently wed couples.
- The Newlywed Game, an American game show that tests the knowledge that spouses in recently married couples have of one another.

== See also ==
- Newlyweds (disambiguation)
