= Newlyweds (disambiguation) =

Newlyweds are people who recently got married.

Newlyweds may also refer to:

- Newlyweds (film), a 2011 film written and directed by Edward Burns
- Newlyweds (TV series), an Australian sitcom from 1993 to 1994
- Newlyweds (2026 TV series), an upcoming American sitcom on NBC
- Newlyweds: Nick and Jessica, an American reality television series about Nick Lachey and Jessica Simpson
- Newlyweds: The First Year, an American reality documentary television series that premiered on Bravo in 2013
- The Newlywed Game, an American game show
