= Jason Alkire =

American fashion designer

Jason Alkire is an American fashion designer and partner of the Haus Alkire fashion label. His partner and wife is Julie Alkire, also known as Julie Haus. The first public season of the New York made women's collection was Fall 2012.

Along with garment design, Alkire also creates the custom textile prints for the collection. He employs techniques in painting, drawing, graphic design, and photography to produce the prints.

In 2018, Alkire was inducted into the Council of Fashion Designers of America (CFDA). He graduated from the University of Houston and was a member of the Pi Kappa Alpha fraternity.

== Career ==
Prior to his fashion designer career, Alkire was an advertising executive and the publisher and creative director of SPOON magazine. The magazine was distributed by Time Warner. Alkire worked with Haus at the publication. She was the editor-in-chief there before she began her fashion career. She is also known for her work on her eponymous line Julie Haus, which Alkire also helped design.

== Retail business ==
Alkire and Haus opened a retail store in New York City in 2010 dedicated to the Julie Haus label. In 2013, the designers closed the store to open a new atelier type store dedicated to the Haus Alkire collection. That store is located on White Street in the neighborhood of Tribeca in New York City.

== Creative inspiration ==
The first collection (Autumn/Winter 2012) was shown at New York Fashion Week on February 14, 2012. The designers sought inspiration from the artist Lou Jie and the actress Elsa Martinelli's portrayal of Belle Star in the 1968 film The Belle Star Story. The New York Fashion Week event was held at the Lincoln Center for the Performing Arts.

The second collection was inspired by Hana, Hawaii. The designers used images of an imaginary creature along with Plumeria and bamboo trees as the subject for their textile prints. The showing was held at a home in the West Village area of New York City.

== Awards ==
Alkire and Haus were awarded the Ecco Domani Fashion Foundation Award for Womenswear in January 2012. The award recognizes emerging American fashion talent.

In 2012, the designers were named to the W Hotels Fashion Next program.

In 2013, the Autumn/Winter collection was sponsored by Swarovski Elements.

In 2015, the designers were awarded The Fashion Group International Rising Star Award for womenswear. There were ten finalists competing for the award that included Rosie Assoulin, Tome, Ji Oh, Tanya Taylor, Antonio Azzuolo, Harbison, and Houghton. Previous winners of the award include Proenza Schouler, Alexander Wang (designer), Jason Wu, Phillip Lim, and Wes Gordon. Wu was the guest speaker at the award ceremony. In 2014, Alkire and Haus were finalists for same award. In 2015, the designers also won the Design Entrepreneurs NYC Israel Goldgrub award presented by New York City Economic Development Corporation NYCEDC and the Fashion Institute of Technology.

In 2016, Haus Alkire was named to the Council of Fashion Designers of America (CFDA) {Fashion Incubator} 4.0 class for 2016–2018.
