= Julie Haus =

American fashion designer

Julie Haus-Alkire (born 1973 as Julie Ann Hoeinghaus) is a fashion designer from the United States. She has designed for her line Julie Haus, and the women's designer collection Haus Alkire. In 2018, she was inducted into the Council of Fashion Designers of America (CFDA).

== Biography ==
She was born and raised in Texas. Julie Haus, as she is known in the fashion industry, was taught to sew by her grandmother around the age of thirteen. Haus is married to Jason Alkire, also a fashion designer and former advertising executive, photographer and graphic designer. They met while attending the University of Houston and were married in 1998. The couple now live in New York City.

== Fashion labels ==
Haus and Akire are the designers behind Haus Alkire. Haus Alkire is a designer ready-to-wear womenswear collection that has presented at New York Fashion Week since 2012.

Additionally, the Alkires were the creative figures behind the "Julie Haus" collection as well as the "J/J by Julie Haus" diffusion line. The Julie Haus ready-to-wear collection was first presented to the public in New York in 2006. The line attracted retailers such as Saks Fifth Avenue, Barneys New York, Neiman Marcus, Harvey Nichols Dubai and Hong Kong, Saks Fifth Avenue Mexico, Plum in Lebanon, Blubird/Boboli in Canada, Via Bus Stop in Japan, Bloomingdale's in New York and Dubai, The Upper East in Jakarta, and Vakko and Beymen in Istanbul. The J/J by Julie Haus diffusion label is known for developing private label product for Barneys New York and product for Anthropologie.

The Julie Haus label has been covered in the press by Women's Wear Daily, Harper's Bazaar, Vogue, Elle, Marie Claire, Nylon, Lucky, InStyle, Teen Vogue, Seventeen, People, The New York Times, New York Post, Daily News (New York), New York, Gotham and others. Japanese press has also covered the label, as the designer has a small cult following in the country. A few of those press outlets are Glitter, Pinky (magazine), Glamorous, Boao, Sweet, Elle Japan, Bijin Hyakka, The Cover, Non-no, Popteen, ar, and CREA. Celebrities such as Jessica Alba, Leighton Meester, Eva Mendes, and many others have worn the designer label.

The Julie Haus collection was shown at New York Fashion Week. In 2009 and 2010, the runway collections were styled by Kate Lanphear, then style director of Elle.

In September 2010, Haus and Alkire opened their first retail flagship on Broome Street in the SoHo shopping section of New York City, near other well-known designers. The Julie Haus flagship retailed one-of-a-kind items as well as collaborations with up-and-coming fashion accessory designers.

== Other facts ==
- In 2008, Texas Monthly named Julie Haus to the No.3 spot on their "Industry12" list of fashion leaders in the state.
- Haus established a handbag line prior to developing the ready-to-wear collection. The handbags were sold in boutiques and retailers such as Takashimaya, Henri Bendel, and Nordstrom.
- In the late 1990s Haus and Akire founded Spoon magazine, a high-end lifestyle publication. Time Warner distributed the magazine.
