= Patrik Ervell =

American fashion designer

- Education: University of California, Berkeley
- Awards: Ecco Domani Fashion Foundation Award for Menswear (2007)

Patrik Ervell is an American menswear designer. He is a graduate of the University of California, Berkeley, where he studied political science, economics and art history. Ervell ran his eponymous label in New York City from 2005 until 2017, when he stopped producing seasonal collections and became vice president of men's design at the Los Angeles–based brand Vince.

== Early life and education ==
Ervell was born in California to Swedish immigrant parents, who had met in San Francisco in the 1960s; his father worked in the shipping container industry. He has said that he spent time in Sweden and three years in London before moving to Northern California in about the second or third grade, and that he grew up in San Francisco.

He graduated from the University of California, Berkeley with a degree in political science, economics and art history, having intended to become a diplomat. He passed the United States Foreign Service examination but decided against a diplomatic career and moved to New York City a week after graduating. There he worked as a stylist, including on Apple campaigns for the iPod and its earbuds, and joined the fashion magazine V, where he had interned as a student, as an associate editor; he also took classes at Parsons School of Design, though he said he mostly learned by doing.

== Career ==
=== Patrik Ervell label ===
The label began as screen-printed T-shirts that Ervell made while still working at V, using faded images of marble statuary and of nebulae photographed by the Hubble Space Telescope. They were among the first items sold at Opening Ceremony, the New York City store founded by his University of California, Berkeley contemporaries Humberto Leon and Carol Lim, who remained close friends; Ervell later described the retailer as an incubator that let him build the label at his own pace, and it was still his largest stockist a decade later. He debuted under his own name at the store in 2005 and made what he called his official debut with a spring 2006 collection.

Upon winning the Ecco Domani Award for Menswear in 2007, Ervell debuted his collection in his first runway show. Since then, Ervell has received nominations for the CFDA's Swarovski Award for Menswear in 2008, 2009 and 2010, and he was the runner up for the CFDA/Vogue Fashion Fund Award in 2009. In 2011, he was nominated for GQ's Best New Menswear Designer in America and for the CFDA's Menswear Designer of the Year award, for which he was nominated again in 2012. He showed in both presentation and runway formats, and for his fall–winter 2012 collection he returned to the runway.

Ervell launched his online store in 2010. He kept the label independent, saying in 2017 that he had taken no outside investment, had never worked with a stylist, and staged his runway shows himself with a small support staff. The business remained small: by that year it had about a dozen wholesale accounts, among them Opening Ceremony, American Rag in Japan, Jackpot in Korea and East Dane, and its own e-commerce site was its single largest account. The collection had previously been carried by Barneys New York, Bloomingdale's and Nordstrom but was not stocked by a major American department store at the time. After three of his stockists closed within a single month he took three seasons off from the runway, presenting his collections through look books instead, and in early 2017 he returned by joining the New York Fashion Week: Men's schedule for the first time.

=== Design ===
Ervell's designs are characterized as utilitarian, minimal and elegant. He is noted for using innovative and unusual fabrics including gold foil, vintage parachute cloth and handmade rubber raincoats, and later high-performance textiles; he has cited Helmut Lang's work of the 1990s as the origin of that interest in materials. He had an ongoing collaboration with the textile company Maharam. Among his signature designs was the Air Jacket, a nylon piece whose silhouette echoed the technical fleeces made by Patagonia and The North Face, brands he named as reference points, and he described his aesthetic as rooted in the tradition of American sportswear rather than in preppy dress.

Reviewing his autumn/winter 2011 collection, Dazed wrote that he drew on military uniform detailing, showing a bomber jacket alongside an M-65 field coat and a US Army officer's jacket. Reviewing his fall/winter 2015 show, Interview described him building the collection from sportswear staples such as bombers, windbreakers and hoodies while drawing on futuristic and science-fiction imagery.

=== Later career ===
Ervell showed his final runway collection, for spring/summer 2018, in July 2017. In September 2017, Vince announced his appointment as vice president of men's design, a newly created position; he moved to Los Angeles, and his first collection for the brand was scheduled for January 2018. Speaking to GQ that November, he said that he was no longer producing seasonal collections or shows under his own name and that the label existed as a project whose future was undecided. The Vince collection, for autumn/winter 2018–19, was presented in Paris, and Ervell said he had put his own label on hold in order to concentrate on Vince. He was still Vince's menswear designer in late 2018.

In August 2024, Fashionista reported that Proenza Schouler had engaged Ervell to work on a men's collection, and in January 2025 WWD reported that he described himself on LinkedIn as the label's head of menswear, a question its chief executive declined to address.
