= Signe Paterson =

Swedish-American vaudeville performer (1890–1963)

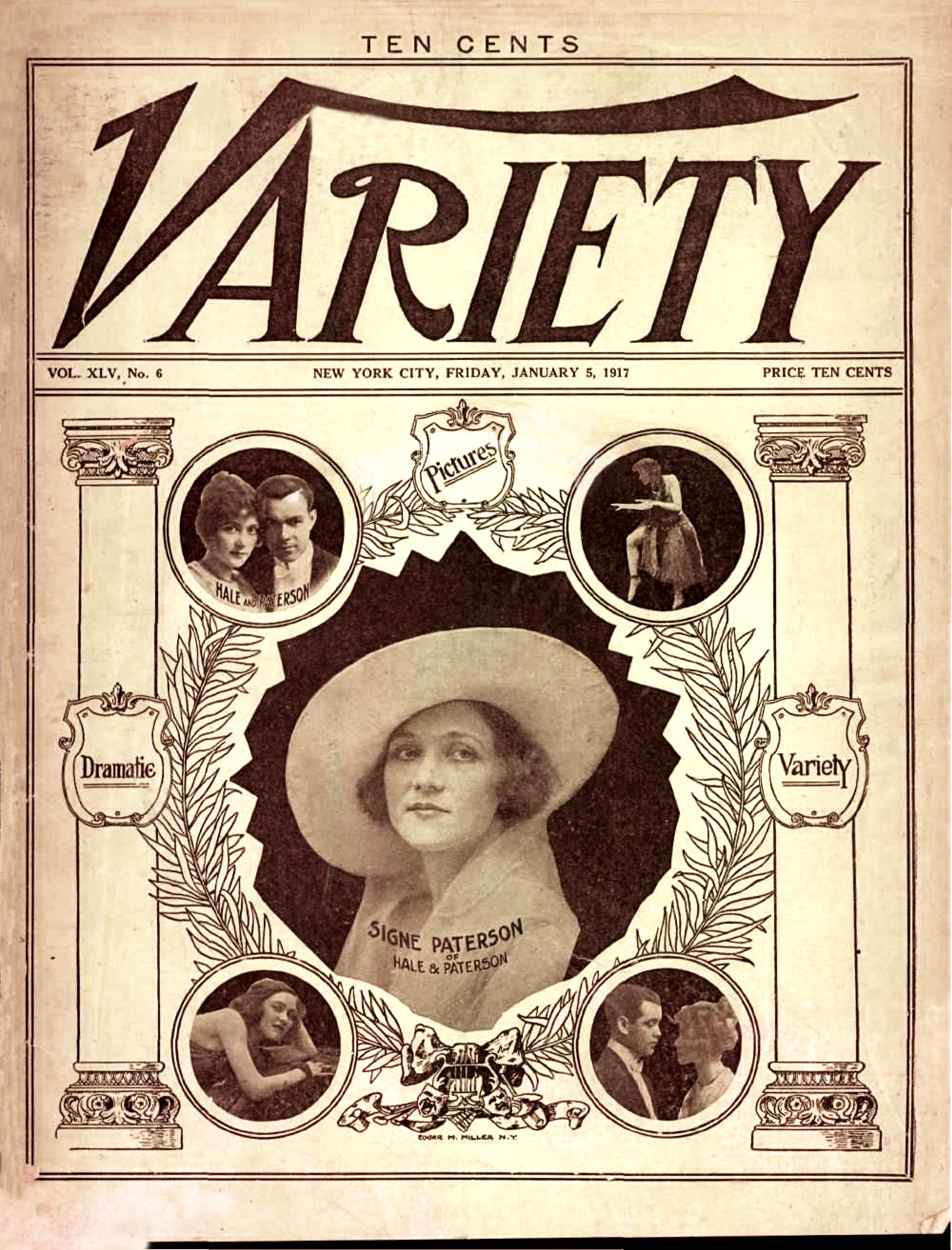
Paterson on the cover of Variety, January 1917

Signe Paterson (May 6, 1890 – August 15, 1963), sometimes written as Signe Patterson, was a Swedish-born American vaudeville dancer, celebrated both for her solo performances and as one-half of the jazz duo Hale and Paterson alongside Frank Hale.

Paterson introduced the shimmy — a dance known at the time as the Shimmy-She-a-Wabble —onto the American stage. She is also credited as the first non- Hawaiian to introduce the Hula to the United States, in the 1920s, raising awareness of the Hawaiian national dance on American shores.

== Early life ==
Paterson was born in Stockholm, Sweden in 1890 as the eldest of eleven siblings, including one brother and six sisters. As a teenager, Paterson performed around Sweden, including as the principal dancer of King Gustav V of Sweden, reportedly his favorite performer. At age 14, she left her hometown of Sundleyberg to become an Actor in America.

== Career ==
After leaving Sweden, Paterson moved to Rhode Island to live with family friends while studying English and dramatic arts. While still a young teenager, she joined the chorus of the Chicago production of Prince of Tonight, touring the US and Canada.

Soon after, Paterson joined the Chicago chorus of the show A Modern Eve, where she met her longtime dance partner Frank Hale. Due to the female lead's illness, Paterson was promoted to perform alongside Hale on opening night. Her debut was received enthusiastically by the audience, and Hale and Paterson went on to perform 300 shows in Chicago, a record for the era.

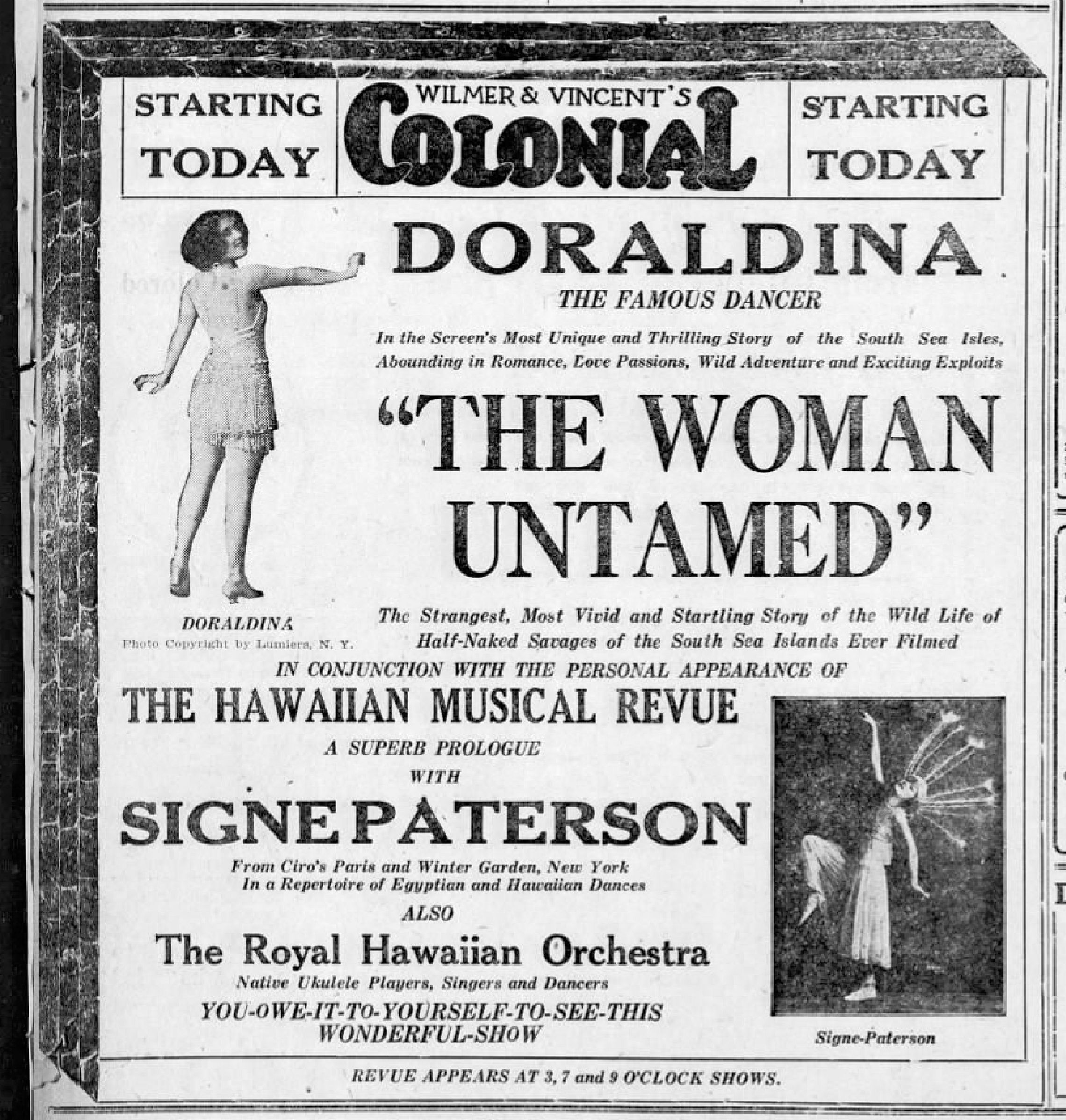
Signe Paterson in a 1921 advert

Following her early success, she traveled to Paris where she performed on the stage at venues including Ciro's Paris and received top billing. She mingled in upper class and high society circles and was friendly with Grand Duke Boris of Russia, who regularly came to see her perform, as well as Alexander Montagu, the Duke of Manchester. Back in America, she taught society figures to dance in Newport, Palm Beach, and New York City, including Edith Rockefeller McCormick, who she taught to tango.

Paterson performed around the globe at notable venues, including New York's Winter Garden Theater and Shubert Theater and the London Opera House, and participated in numerous touring productions around the US, including the George M. Cohan Review, which toured in 1918. At the height of her fame, she appeared on the cover of Variety in January 1917, with five photos on the cover, including solo portraits as well as photos together with her partner Hale. In 1921, she was presented to President Warren G. Harding in Washington D.C.

During her years on the New York stage and in the theater circuit, Paterson worked with the Original Dixieland Jazz Band on the Keith-Albee circuit of vaudeville and motion picture theaters. She was well known for introducing dance styles that American audiences were unfamiliar with. She learned to dance the Hula in the Sandwich Islands and adapted it for Western audiences, performing in Sweden and Paris before attempting to raise its profile in America by performing it in Central Park in 1916. While performing the Hula, she was backed by The Royal Hawaiian Orchestra. In addition to the Hula and the Shimmy, she is credited with introducing the Tango onto Broadway.

Together with her manager and eventual husband, F. Ralph Gervers, she is credited with producing the first large-scale stage presentation running at motion picture theaters.

Throughout her career, various nicknames included "The Sprite from Sweden". and "Goddess of the Dance"

== Personal life ==
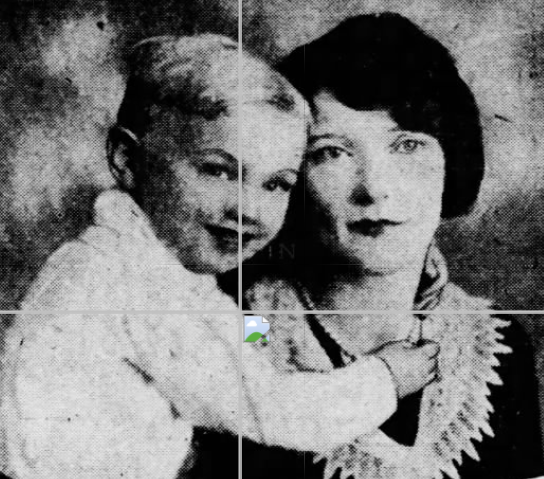
Signe Paterson Gervers with her son James

Following Paterson's marriage to F. Ralph Gervers, she left her career to start a family and moved to Pittsburgh in 1928, before moving to Tampa, Florida in 1934. In Tampa, she was active in civic affairs, working as society editor and associate editor of the Port-Tampa Interbay Beacon, president of the Port Tampa Women's Club, and helped organize the Port Tampa Library and Port Tampa Blood Bank.

Paterson contributed to war efforts on multiple occasions. During World War I, she served in the Women's Service Division in New York, also performing in training camps to entertain American troops. She also used her fame to appeal to Swedish-Americans to supply tobacco and pipes to those serving in the United States Army. In Tampa, she helmed the Red Cross Canteen during World War II.

She had two children, a son named James A. Gervers and a son named Albert Gervers. Through her son James, she is the grandmother of filmmaker Erik Courtney. Paterson died August 15, 1963, aged 73.
