= Guy Dennis =

American football player (born 1947)

No. 63, 60, 68
- Positions: Guard, center

Personal information
- Born: February 28, 1947 (age 79); Walnut Hill, Florida, U.S.
- Listed height: 6 ft 2 in (1.88 m)
- Listed weight: 255 lb (116 kg)

Career information
- High school: Ernest Ward (Walnut Hill)
- College: Florida
- NFL draft: 1969: 5th round, 109th overall pick

Career history
- Cincinnati Bengals (1969–1972); Detroit Lions (1973–1975)

Awards and highlights
- First-team All-American (1968); 2× First-team All-SEC (1967, 1968); University of Florida Athletic Hall of Fame

Career NFL/AFL statistics
- Games played: 89
- Games started: 25
- Stats at Pro Football Reference

Guy Durell Dennis (born February 28, 1947) is an American former professional football player who was an offensive lineman for seven seasons in the National Football League (NFL) during the 1960s and 1970s. Dennis played college football for the Florida Gators, earning First-team All-American honors in 1968. Thereafter, he played in the NFL for the Cincinnati Bengals and the Detroit Lions.

== Early life ==
Dennis was born in Walnut Hill, Florida in 1947, and he attended Ernest Ward High School in Walnut Hill.

== College career ==
Dennis received an athletic scholarship to attend the University of Florida in Gainesville, Florida, where he played guard for coach Ray Graves' Florida Gators football team from 1966 to 1968. He was a first-team All-Southeastern Conference (SEC) selection in 1967 and 1968, a first-team All-American in 1968, and a team captain in 1968. He was also the recipient of the Gators' Fergie Ferguson Award, recognizing the "senior football player who displays outstanding leadership, character and courage."

While he was an undergraduate, Dennis was initiated as a member of the Pi Kappa Alpha fraternity (Alpha Eta chapter). He graduated from Florida with bachelor's degree in 1970, and was later inducted into the University of Florida Athletic Hall of Fame as a "Gator Great."

== Professional career ==
The Cincinnati Bengals selected Dennis in the fifth round (109th pick overall) of the 1969 NFL/AFL draft. He played professional football as a center, offensive guard and offensive tackle for four seasons for the Bengals (1969–1972) and three seasons for the Detroit Lions (1973–1975), In his seven-year NFL career, Dennis played in 89 games with 13 starts. He was also traded to San Diego Chargers and played preseason before retiring.

== See also ==
- 1968 College Football All-America Team
- Florida Gators football, 1960–69
- History of the Cincinnati Bengals
- List of Detroit Lions players
- List of Florida Gators football All-Americans
- List of Florida Gators in the NFL draft
- List of Pi Kappa Alpha brothers
- List of University of Florida alumni
- List of University of Florida Athletic Hall of Fame members
