= Nadine Jolie Courtney =

Circassian-American writer (born 1980)

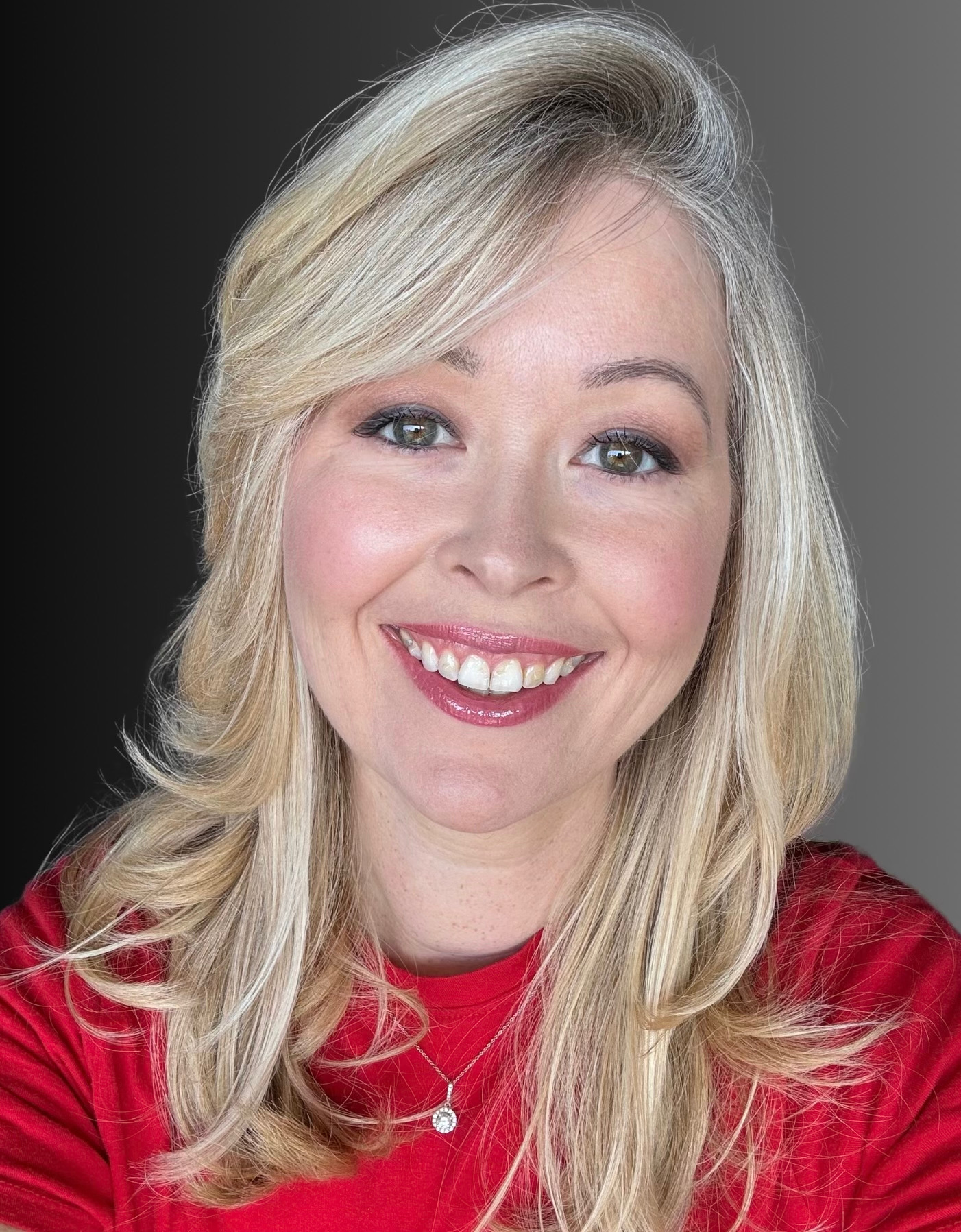
- Born: Nadine Haobsh; August 23, 1980 (age 46); New York City, U.S.
- Education: Barnard College
- Occupations: Author, Journalist
- Spouse: Erik Courtney (m. 2013)

Nadine Jolie Courtney (née Haobsh; Adyghe: Хьаобщ Надинэ-Джули, romanized: Hawobş Nadinə-Djuli; born August 23, 1980) is an American lifestyle writer, novelist, and former media personality. She is the author of the YA novel All-American Muslim Girl, Romancing the Throne, Beauty Confidential: The No Preaching, No Lies, Advice-You'll-Actually-Use-Guide to Looking Your Best, and Confessions of a Beauty Addict. Her blog "Jolie in NYC" received international press in 2005 after Courtney, a former beauty editor, was outed and dooced for anonymously blogging about the beauty industry. The New York Post subsequently dubbed her "the poster girl for the blogger generation".

In 2015, she appeared on season 2 of Bravo's reality documentary television series Newlyweds: The First Year alongside her husband, filmmaker Erik Courtney.

== Early life ==
Courtney was born to a Muslim Jordanian Circassian father and a Roman Catholic mother of Swiss-Austrian descent who later converted to Islam. Courtney was raised in her parents' Muslim faith, experiences she later parlayed into her novel All-American Muslim Girl.

== Career ==
After graduating from Barnard College, Courtney worked at FHM, Lucky, and Ladies' Home Journal. In March 2005, she began blogging under the pseudonym Jolie in NYC, where she dispersed beauty advice and celebrity gossip.

Her identity was revealed by the New York Post in July 2005, and when she was asked to leave Ladies' Home Journal while an offer at Seventeen magazine as Beauty Editor was simultaneously rescinded, her story received international coverage. Courtney appeared on Anderson Cooper, MSNBC, ABC, Fox and CNN and was profiled by the New York Times , People Magazine, The Guardian, Cosmopolitan magazine, Women's Wear Daily, Fashion Week Daily, and Time.

From 2005 to 2007, Courtney worked as a business consultant to 10-goal polo player Carlos Gracida and in 2006 was Creative Consultant to Sarah, Duchess of York. She has written for Town & Country, Vanity Fair, Robb Report and Vogue (magazine).

Under her maiden name Haobsh, Courtney is the author of the bestselling beauty guide Beauty Confidential: The No Preaching, No Lies, Advice-You'll-Actually-Use-Guide to Looking Your Best;. Her first novel Confessions of a Beauty Addict was published in January 2009.

Her third book, a young adult novel called Romancing the Throne, was published in summer 2017. Courtney's fourth book, a young adult novel called All-American Muslim Girl, was published by FSG Books for Young Readers in fall 2019 and was named one of Kirkus Review's Best Young Adult Books of 2019.

In 2024, it was announced that Courtney had penned the screenplay for the eco-thriller Arctic 30, about the Greenpeace Arctic Sunrise protest against oil drilling.

== Personal life ==
Courtney lives in Santa Monica with her husband Erik Courtney, an independent information technology consultant and filmmaker. They have a daughter, Aurelia.

On March 25, 2016, Courtney's brother Pierre Haobsh was arrested on suspicion of murdering a Chinese herbalist, his wife and 5-year-old daughter in Santa Barbara, California. Courtney released a statement on March 27, 2016, condemning the murders and extending prayers to the family.

== Books ==
- Beauty Confidential: The No Preaching, No Lies, Advice-You'll-Actually-Use-Guide to Looking Your Best. Avon A (2007). Paperback: ISBN 0-06-112863-5, ISBN 978-0-06-112863-9.
- Confessions of a Beauty Addict. Avon A (2009). Paperback: ISBN 0-06-112862-7, ASIN: B003A02X5M.
- Romancing the Throne. Katherine Tegen Books (2017). Hardcover: ISBN 0-06-240662-0
- All-American Muslim Girl. FSG Books for Young Readers (2019). ISBN 9780374309527
