= Beauty Confidential =

2007 book by Nadine Haobsh

- Cover of paperback edition
- Author: Nadine Haobsh
- Language: English
- Genre: Beauty
- Publisher: Avon
- Publication date: 2007
- Publication place: United States
- Media type: Print (Paperback)
- Pages: 270 pp
- ISBN: 978-0-06-112863-9
- OCLC: 123029666
- Dewey Decimal: 646.7/042 22
- LC Class: RA778 .H233 2007

Beauty Confidential: The No Preaching, No Lies, Advice-You'll-Actually-Use Guide to Looking Your Best is a 2007 beauty guide by American author Nadine Haobsh.

The author, a former beauty editor, provides tips and product suggestions in chapters broken down to cover beauty topics from head to toe. Beauty Confidential is mentioned in an infomercial for Bare Escentuals Bare Minerals foundation.

== The chapters ==
1. Getting Started: What beauty editors know that you don't
2. Hairstyling: Hairdressers that make love to your hair...and other adventures in styling
3. Hair Color: Blondes don't necessarily have more fun, but salons sure as hell want you to think they do (Or: How a TV show changed my life)
4. Eyes: Making the most of your sexiest feature
5. Complexion: Who needs an MD? Becoming your own dermatologist
6. Sensitive Skin: Your skin is not Mike Tyson; please don't beat it up
7. Face: Your skin is the palette and you are the artist—have fun with makeup
8. Lips: Why should Angelina Jolie have all the fun?
9. Body: Because your tummy and knees are part of your skin, too—pampering your body
10. Bikini Line: We have all become strippers
11. Manicure/Pedicure: If your nails don't look good, you don't look good
12. Epilogue: The importance of beauty
