= Haus Alkire =

American fashion label

- Founded: 2012
- Headquarters: New York, NY
- Website: https://www.hausalkire.com/

Haus Alkire is an American fashion label headed by design partners Julie Alkire and Jason Alkire. Both the Alkires are members of the Council of Fashion Designers of America (CFDA). Established in 2012, the line is made in New York City.

== Founders ==
The label was founded by Julie Alkire and Jason Alkire. Besides co-designing garments, Jason employs techniques in painting, graphic design, and photography to create the custom prints used in the collections. Prior to his fashion designer career, Jason Alkire was an advertising executive and the publisher and creative director of SPOON magazine. The magazine was distributed by Time Warner. Julie Alkire was the editor-in-chief of the same magazine before she began her fashion career. She is known for her work on her eponymous line Julie Haus.

== Retail business ==
In 2013, the designers opened an atelier type store dedicated to the Haus Alkire collection located on White Street in the neighborhood of Tribeca in New York City.

The first collection (Autumn/Winter 2012) was shown at New York Fashion Week on February 14, 2012. The designers sought inspiration from the artist Lou Jie and the actress Elsa Martinelli's portrayal of Belle Star in the 1968 film The Belle Star Story. The New York Fashion Week event was held at the Lincoln Center for the Performing Arts.

The second collection was inspired by Hana, Hawaii. The designers used images of an imaginary creature along with Plumeria and bamboo trees as the subject for their textile prints. The showing was held at a home in the West Village area of New York City.

== Awards ==
The designers were awarded the Ecco Domani Fashion Foundation Award for Womenswear in January 2012. The award recognizes emerging American fashion talent.

In February 2012, the designers were named to the W Hotels Fashion Next program.

In February 2013, the Autumn/Winter collection was sponsored by Swarovski Elements.

In 2015, the designers were awarded The Fashion Group International Rising Star Award for womenswear. There were ten finalists competing for the award that included Rosie Assoulin, Tome, Ji Oh, Tanya Taylor, Antonio Azzuolo, Harbison, and Houghton. Previous winners of the award include Proenza Schouler, Alexander Wang (designer), Jason Wu, Phillip Lim, and Wes Gordon. Wu was the guest speaker at the award ceremony. In 2014, Alkire and Haus were finalists for the same award. In 2015, the designers also won the Design Entrepreneurs NYC Israel Goldgrub award presented by New York City Economic Development Corporation NYCEDC and the Fashion Institute of Technology.

In 2016, HAUS ALKIRE was named to the Council of Fashion Designers of America (CFDA) {Fashion Incubator} 4.0 class for 2016-2018.

== Accolades ==
- The designer label was named one of the "15 Hot New Designers You Need to Know Now" by Refinery29
- ELLE magazine named the line "2012's Rising Fashion Stars"
- Named by Fashionista.com as "Fashionista Five: New York Labels to Watch"
- Paper Magazine declared the line one of the "10 Fresh Fashion Week Faces to Watch"
- USA Network stated the line was "The New Class: Five Designers to Watch at Mercedes-Benz Fashion Week"
- In 2011, an editor compared the design duo to other famous design partners Isabel Toledo and Ruben Toledo, and Max Azria and Lubov Azria, and Maria Cornejo and Mark Bothwick.
