= Alkire House =

Historic house in Ohio, United States

- U.S. National Register of Historic Places
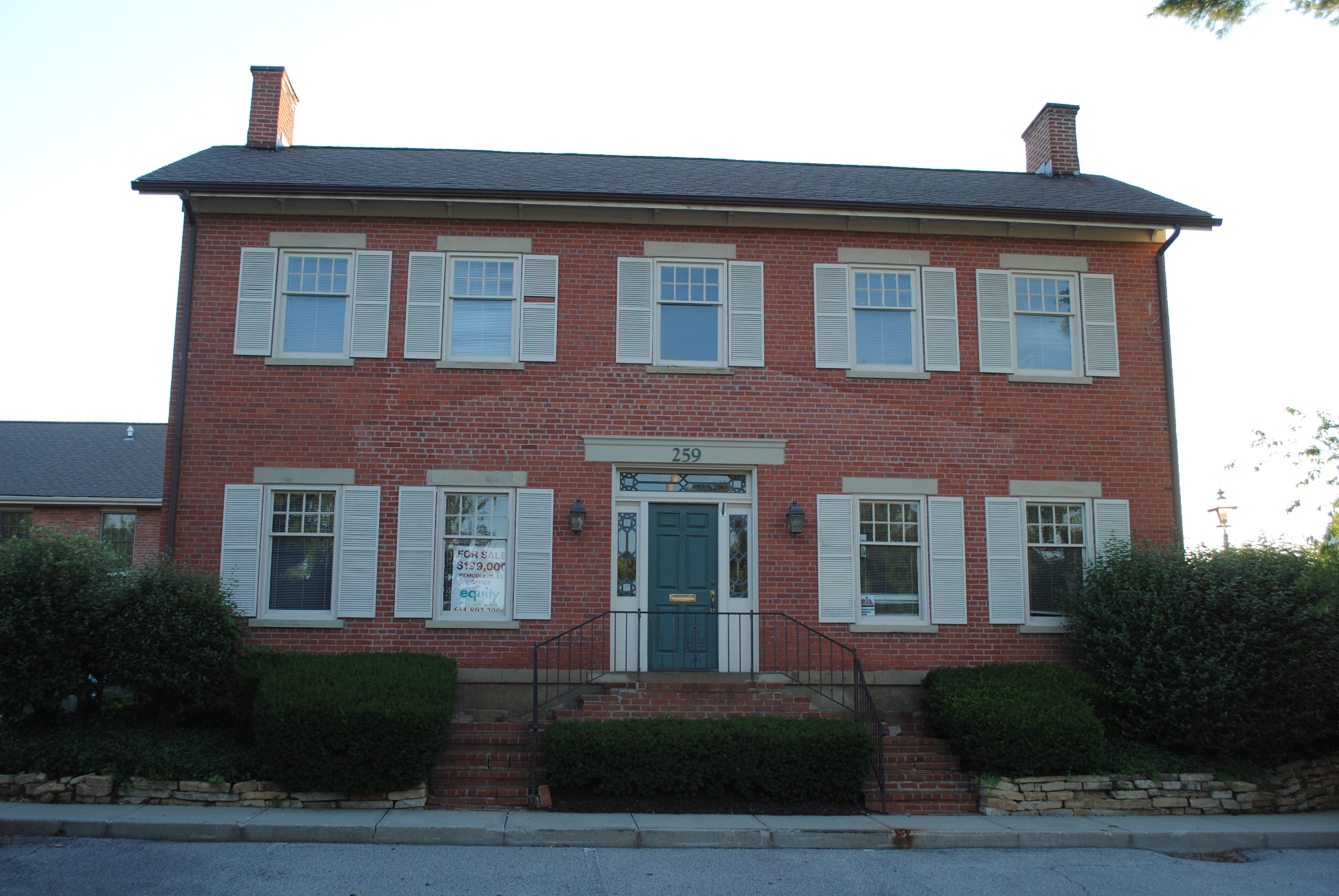
- Front of the house

- Location within Ohio Location within the United States
- Location: 259 N. State St., Westerville, Ohio
- Coordinates: 40°7′58″N 82°56′0″W
- Area: 1 acre (0.40 ha)
- Built: 1849
- Architect: Garrit Sharp
- NRHP reference No.: 78002068
- Added to NRHP: March 30, 1978

The Alkire House is a historic residence in the Columbus suburb of Westerville, Ohio, United States. Constructed during the middle of the nineteenth century and used both as a residence and as a slave-smuggling safehouse, it retains much of its original fabric, and it has been designated a historic site.

== History ==
Garrit Sharp was one of the earliest settlers in Westerville. A conspicuous local Methodist, Sharp was among the pillars of the Methodist Church in the city: he gave land for the construction of its first building, and he also contributed to the establishment of the Blendon Young Men's Seminary, a predecessor institution of Otterbein University. Like other prominent Methodists, Sharp was an active participant in the Underground Railroad, helping to ferry runaway slaves from modern-day metro Columbus to a Quaker community in Morrow County to the north.

Sharp constructed the Alkire House in 1849, following plans found in a builder's handbook. Here he lived for part of his life, surrounded by family members: some of his sons lived nearby along State Street or Africa Road. Like their father, the sons were active Underground Railroad participants, and slaves would often be conveyed to any of the houses in the complex.

== Architecture ==
The Alkire House is a brick building with an asphalt roof, decorated with elements of wood and stone. A chimney is constructed at each end of the main building, to which is attached a large one-story rear addition. Five bays wide, the facade features windows with shutters surrounding a central main entrance. This door is approached by a wooden porch with a distinctive balustrade under the eaves, and sidelights frame the doorway. Masonry is employed throughout the construction; the foundation mixes brick and stone, while the windows and doorways uniformly feature stone lintels.

== Preservation ==
In early 1978, the Alkire House was listed on the National Register of Historic Places, qualifying because of its historically significant architecture. It is one of fourteen National Register-listed locations citywide; among the others are several buildings associated with the Otterbein University campus as well as the home of Garrit's son Stephen Sharp, one of the Africa Road houses that was used for slave-transporting purposes.
