= Wes Gordon =

American fashion designer

- Born: 1986 or 1987 (age 39–40); Chicago, Illinois, U.S.
- Education: Central St. Martins in London
- Occupation: Fashion designer
- Labels: Wes Gordon; Carolina Herrera

Wes Gordon (born 1986 or 1987) is an American fashion designer. He founded his eponymous womenswear label in New York in 2009 and presented it there from 2010 to 2016. He has been the creative director of Carolina Herrera since 2018.

== Early life and education ==
Born in Chicago, Illinois, Gordon was raised in Atlanta, Georgia. As a teenager, he took after-school sewing lessons with a local dressmaker. He attended the Lovett School in Atlanta and graduated in 2005, then moved to London to study womenswear at Central St. Martins, graduating in 2009. During his studies, he spent two summers interning with Oscar de la Renta in New York before working part-time at Tom Ford's London atelier in Chelsea.

== Career ==
=== Wes Gordon, 2009–18 ===
After graduating, Gordon moved to New York's Financial District and launched his own line of women's wear from his studio apartment in December of that year. He presented his first collection during the fall 2010 New York Fashion Week and continued to show the label in New York until 2016. His first runway show was the Spring/Summer 2014 collection. Harrods and Saks Fifth Avenue picked up the line immediately, followed a year later by Bergdorf Goodman and Kirna Zabête. He built the business in part through trunk shows across the country; he held his first at 23, for a group of friends and family. Katy Perry, January Jones, Lena Dunham, and Gwyneth Paltrow have worn his designs, as has Michelle Obama. He was a finalist for the CFDA/Vogue Fashion Fund in 2012 and 2014, and received the Fashion Group International's Rising Star Award.

=== Carolina Herrera, 2018–present ===
Gordon began consulting for Carolina Herrera in March 2017, working directly with the house's founder. In February 2018, Herrera announced she was stepping down as creative director and named Gordon her successor; she took her final bow at that month's New York Fashion Week and moved into a new role as global brand ambassador.

His first runway show for the house, presenting the Spring 2019 collection, was held on September 10, 2018, at the New-York Historical Society. He has described his vision for Herrera as an "exuberant, joyful, colorful happy house". WWD's review called the debut impressive but said the collection "could have benefited from fewer proposals developed in greater depth".

A pride-flag cape he designed was worn by Lena Waithe to the 2018 Met Gala. In 2021, the Museum at the Fashion Institute of Technology presented him with its Couture Council Award for Artistry of Fashion. With photographer Elizaveta Porodina, he published Colormania: Color and Fashion (Rizzoli, 2023), a book of images of the house's collections with a foreword by Edward Enninful. In April 2024, he was named Designer of the Year at the American Image Awards.

== Personal life ==
Gordon's husband is Paul Arnhold, a real estate developer and glassblower. Around 2014, the couple moved into Thistledown Farm, a 50-acre property in Roxbury, Connecticut with a farmhouse dating to 1790, which they restored with interior designer Stephen Sills. They have a son, Henry.
