= Newlyweds: The First Year =

- Genre: Reality
- Country of origin: United States
- Original language: English
- No. of seasons: 3
- No. of episodes: 28

Production
- Executive producers: Will Macdonald; Bobbie Birleffi; Anna Geddes
- Running time: 42 minutes
- Production company: Monkey Kingdom

Original release
- Network: Bravo
- Release: May 6, 2013 – March 2, 2016

Newlyweds: The First Year is an American reality television series that premiered on May 6, 2013, on Bravo. The series chronicles the lives of four newly married couples from across the country. It follows the duos from their actual wedding day until their one-year anniversary, highlighting everything that occurs in between. None of the couples ever meet but viewers see the commonalities between their married lives. On October 7, 2013, the series was renewed for a second season. In April 2014, Bravo announced the third season renewal with both seasons airing in late 2014 and 2015. However, Bravo later pushed the premiere date and the second season premiered on March 10, 2015. The number of episodes was increased from eight to ten.

== Cast ==
=== Season 1 ===
John Lagoudes, Kathryn Bougadis, Kimberly V. Gedeon, Alaska Gedeon, Tina Sugandh, Tarz Ludwigsen, Blair Late and Jeff Pedersen (from left)

==== Kimberly V. Cherebin and Alaska Gedeon ====
Kimberly is a celebrity stylist from the Bronx, while Alaska works as a director of Artist and Repertoire at Warner Bros. Records and is from Brooklyn; the couple now lives in Harlem, NY. The duo bounce between Los Angeles and New York City as they balance their marriage and careers. Kim dreams of starting a family in Harlem but Alaska's business prevents them from doing that. Alaska and Kim's religious beliefs provide them with a strong balance.

==== Jeff Pedersen and Blair Late ====
Blair and Jeff were introduced to each other at a mutual friend's pool party. After almost a year of dating, the couple entered a domestic partnership in Savannah, Georgia. Jeff and Blair visit a sex therapist to address a large gap in their sex drives and other issues associated with their 16-year age difference, contrasting careers, and minor personality clashes. Blair is a former European pop star and current entertainment reporter, while Jeff works as a federal investigator.

==== Tina Sugandh and Tarz Ludwigsen ====
Tina is an Indian international pop star, and Tarz is president/co-founder of a start-up Internet company, Pandoodle. While the couple have successful careers, they find it challenging to find time together, which they hope to change with marriage. Tarz also finds himself clashing with Tina's father, who follows traditional Indian values. After dating for four years, they married in December 2011. After suffering a miscarriage, their son was born six week premature in June 2013. They also have a daughter named Song Sugandh born in July 2015.

==== Kathryn Bougadis and John Lagoudes ====
Kathryn left her steady job and city lifestyle after she wed John just six months after they met. Soon after they were pregnant; their son Dean James Lagoudes was born September 24, 2012. The couple now reside in the suburbs and own a Long Island tanning salon.

=== Season 2 ===
Laura Knight, Kirk Knight, Samantha Abby, Laura Leigh Abby, Nadine Jolie Courtney, Erik Courtney, Rouvaun Walker and Toi Troutman-Walker (from left)

==== Laura Leigh Abby and Samantha Abby ====
Sam is the owner of her own production company, Penny Lane Pictures, while Laura is a writer. They live in New York City.

==== Erik Courtney and Nadine Jolie Courtney ====
Nadine is a screenwriter and author of books including Beauty Confidential and All-American Muslim Girl, and Erik is an IT consultant and filmmaker. They live in Santa Monica, California with their daughter Aurelia.

==== Kirk Knight and Laura Knight ====
Laura is the owner of an insurance brokerage company and is a Pilates instructor, and Kirk is the owner of his own commercial real estate investment company as well as an Internet startup. They live in Bethesda, Maryland.

==== Rouvaun Walker and Toi Troutman-Walker ====
Rouvaun is a mortgage banker, and Toi, who owns a hair extension line called Renown Hair, is a former celebrity publicist. They live in Hayward, California.

=== Season 3 ===
- Rochelle and Rob Brann
- Erica and Adonis Gladney
- Brandon Liberati and Craig Ramsay
- Tara and Rob Radcliffe

== Episodes ==
=== Series overview ===
Season	Episodes	Originally released	
Season	Episodes	First released	Last released
1	8	May 6, 2013	June 24, 2013
2	10	March 10, 2015	May 12, 2015
3	10	January 3, 2016	March 2, 2016

=== Season 1 (2013) ===
No. overall	No. in season	Title	Original release date	U.S. viewers (millions)
1	1	"Ready Set Wed"	May 6, 2013	1.02
Kim and Alaska put their lives into the fast lane after taking it slow with a seven-year courtship but first, Kim has to deal with issues regarding her bridesmaids' weight. After only knowing each other for a year, Kathryn and John wed in a traditional Greek wedding; Kathryn also prepares to leave her life in New York City behind to move in with John at his Long Island home. Blair and Jeff make it official and sign their domestic partnership papers. Tina and Tarz have a Bollywood-themed wedding in South Carolina.
2	2	"The Honeymoon's Over?"	May 13, 2013	0.95
Blair starts to plan the couples commitment ceremony in Savannah, Georgia. Tina and Tarz decide to get matching tattoos, which is displeasing to Tina's conservative father. Kathryn is not fond of her new role as a traditional housewife. Kim isn't too keen on living with Alaska's sister and 2-year old nephew in his former bachelor pad but Alaska is consistent with keeping living costs low.
3	3	"Be Mine"	May 20, 2013	0.97
Jeff tells Blair that he's overreacting to news regarding the death of his idol, Whitney Houston. Blair uncovers the fact that Jeff's actions as a husband are closely connected in his relationship with his parents. Tina and Kathryn receive the results regarding, only two months after their weddings. They both feel that their husbands don't feel the same way about the idea of becoming parents. Kim talks with her father and asks for advice on how to control Alaska's dominance with making decisions. Later, the couples celebrate Valentine’s Day each in their own special way.
4	4	"Can You Let Me Talk?"	May 27, 2013	0.99
It is now the third month. Kathryn becomes boss of the tanning salon John just purchased. Alaska, after the move, has to remind Kim that he is the boss of the household. Tina is starting to get annoyed with Tarz breaking the baby-making schedule constantly. After being domestically partnered for over two months, the weekend of Jeff and Blair's commitment ceremony has arrived. Jeff is bothered by his parents' constant rejection and hateful comments.
5	5	"All I Want Is Everything"	June 3, 2013	0.94
At the five month mark, the couples are starting to get into a schedule with each other. Jeff and Blair's sex life starts to simmer down. John has lost physical attraction to Kathryn, which causes insecurities to lash out. After Tina gives Tarz a lap dance, he fails to find it sexy but does deem it cute. Alaska and Kim are able to spice up their relationship after not seeing each other — but once they separate coasts, things go south.
6	6	"You Are So Different Now"	June 10, 2013	1.10
7	7	"Sex and Money"	June 17, 2013	1.30
8	8	"Happily Ever After"	June 24, 2013	1.06
-	-	"Watch What Happens Live: Reunion"	June 24, 2013	1.02

=== Season 2 (2015) ===
No. overall	No. in season	Title	Original release date	U.S. viewers (millions)
9	1	"Vow or Never"	March 10, 2015	
Erik and Nadine get married after knowing each other for only seven months. Toi and Rouvaun get a second chance at love while Laura and Kirk plan a lavish wedding in Washington D.C. Sam springs a last-minute prenuptial agreement on Laura.
10	2	"Couples Retreat"	March 17, 2015	
11	3	"Weight of the World"	March 24, 2015	
12	4	"Pressure Cooker"	March 31, 2015	
13	5	"Please Baby, Baby Please"	April 7, 2015	
14	6	"Family Secrets"	April 14, 2015	
15	7	"Nun Better"	April 21, 2015	
16	8	"Great Expectations"	April 28, 2015	
17	9	"Hurry up and Weight"	May 5, 2015	
18	10	"The Final Push"	May 12, 2015	

=== Season 3 (2016) ===
No. overall	No. in season	Title	Original release date	U.S. viewers (millions)
19	1	"Wedding or Knot"	January 3, 2016	1.16
20	2	"Two Mini-Moons and a Wedding"	January 6, 2016	0.49
21	3	"Fight or Flight"	January 13, 2016	0.48
22	4	"Vow And Again"	January 20, 2016	N/A
23	5	"A Very Modern Family"	January 27, 2016	0.45
24	6	"It's All Gravy"	February 3, 2016	0.41
25	7	"I Got You Babe"	February 10, 2016	0.46
26	8	"Wife Is a Stage"	February 17, 2016	0.49
27	9	"Florida or Bust"	February 24, 2016	0.42
28	10	"How To Get Away With Marriage"	March 2, 2016	0.41
