= Ecco Domani =

Brand of Italian wine

- Industry: Wine
- Founder: Fabrizio Gatto
- Headquarters: California
- Website: https://www.eccodomani.com/

Ecco Domani is the brand of an Italian wine company selling in the United States, Canada, and Northern Europe, with marketing and distribution by E & J Gallo Winery. It was founded in 1996 and is led by Fabrizio Gatto. Market Watch named it one of the "hot brands" in 1998. It reportedly produces the top imported Italian pinot grigio in the United States.

== Advertising ==
Ecco Domani has used marketing strategies that went "into people's lifestyles" and advertisements aimed at young consumers. One of the company's campaigns in print publications featured a "young woman kicking up her heels, with a statement that: 'Red wine is for meat, white wine is for fish. Blah! blah! blah! blah! Forget the rules! Enjoy the wine.'"

== Fashion Foundation Awards ==
The company also sponsors the Fashion Foundation Awards in support of young designers. Former winners include Haus Alkire, John Patrick Patrik Ervell and Prabal Gurung. The 2014 Fashion Fund Awards, which are the thirteenth edition of the fund, winners are Timo Weiland, Degen, and Novis. Past winners include Zac Posen, Proenza Schouler, Rodarte, Alexander Wang, and Derek Lam.
