= Erik Courtney =

American filmmaker (born 1973)

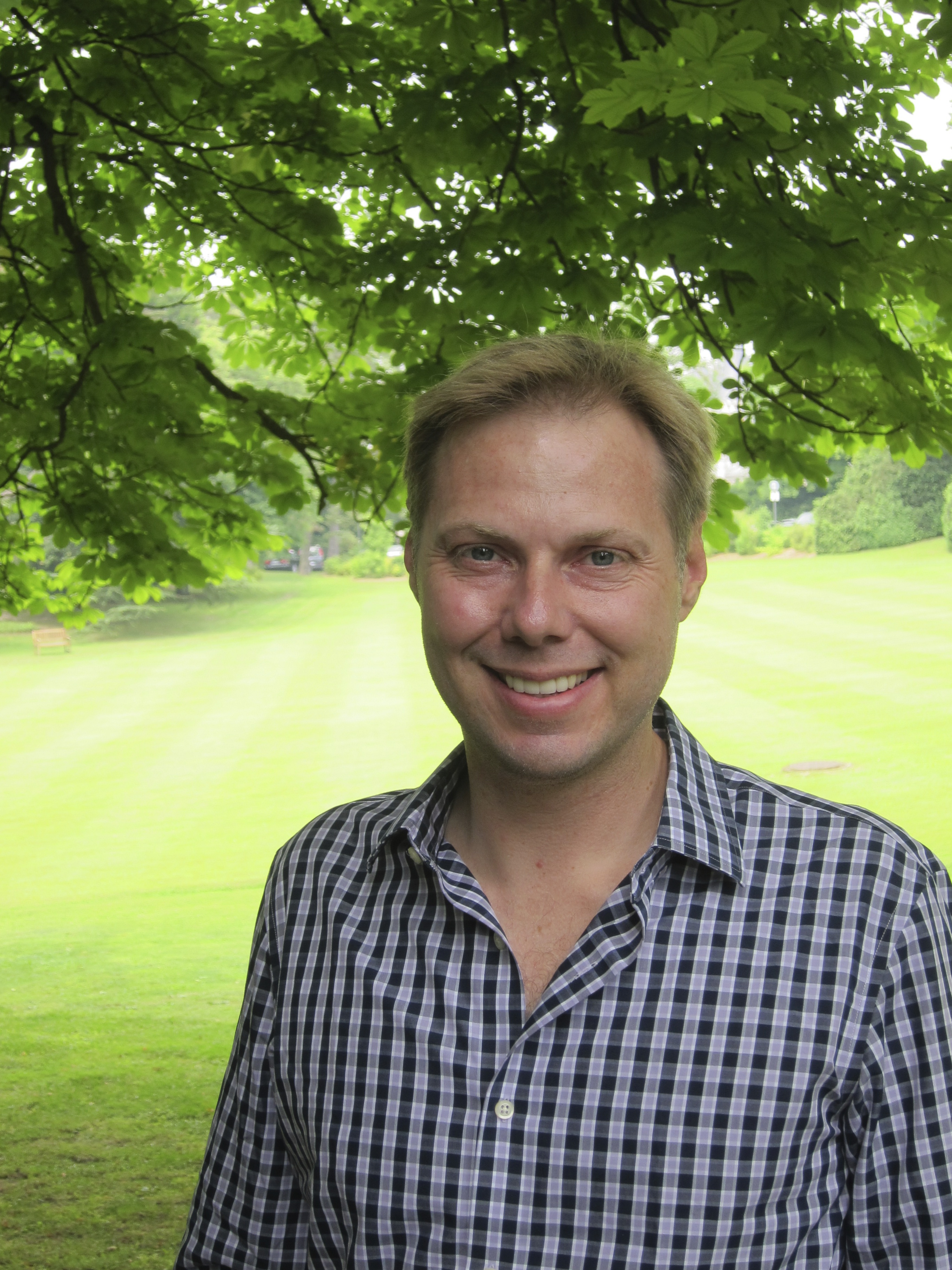
- Born: December 2, 1973 (age 52); Hialeah, Florida, U.S.
- Education: Columbia University, UCLA
- Occupations: Filmmaker, Entrepreneur
- Spouse: Nadine Jolie Courtney (m. 2013)

Erik Courtney (born December 2, 1973) is an American filmmaker and visual FX artist for TV shows including Star Trek: Picard and films including The Tourist. He holds an IMAX patent.

In 2015, he appeared on season 2 of the Bravo docu-series Newlyweds: The First Year alongside his wife, author Nadine Jolie Courtney.

== Early life ==
Courtney attended Columbia University, where he founded the Columbia University Film Productions Club in 2000. He is the holder of an IMAX Patent created in 2009, for a method for recomposing large format media, relating to a process for shooting an entire scene on a single large format film camera and recomposing the filmed scene into a video stream suitable for transfer to conventional formats.

He has a Master's Degree in Film Production from UCLA.

== Filmmaking ==
After graduating from UCLA, Courtney worked in feature development at James Cameron's Lightstorm Entertainment. In 2005, Courtney wrote and directed a four-minute real-time IMAX short film called The Persistence of Dreams. It was the first recreation of Abraham Lincoln's assassination to be filmed in Ford's Theatre. The film debuts the use of Large Format Negative Repurposing (LFNR™), a post-production process that involves zooming into an IMAX negative to create shot coverage.

In 2008, Courtney won the Grand Prize at the Seattle Science Fiction Fantasy Short Film Festival for his film Forecast, which was also selected in September 2008 to open the Santa Monica Film Festival.

As a visual effects artist, Courtney has worked on films including Red Riding Hood, Hitchcock, The Tourist, City of Ember, and Apocalypto, and the TV show Star Trek: Picard.

== Personal life ==
His paternal grandmother is vaudeville dancer Signe Paterson. In January 2015, Courtney was announced as a cast member on season 2 of Bravo's reality documentary television series Newlyweds: The First Year alongside his wife, author Nadine Jolie Courtney. The couple lives in Santa Monica.
