= United States federal budget =

Budget of the U.S. federal government

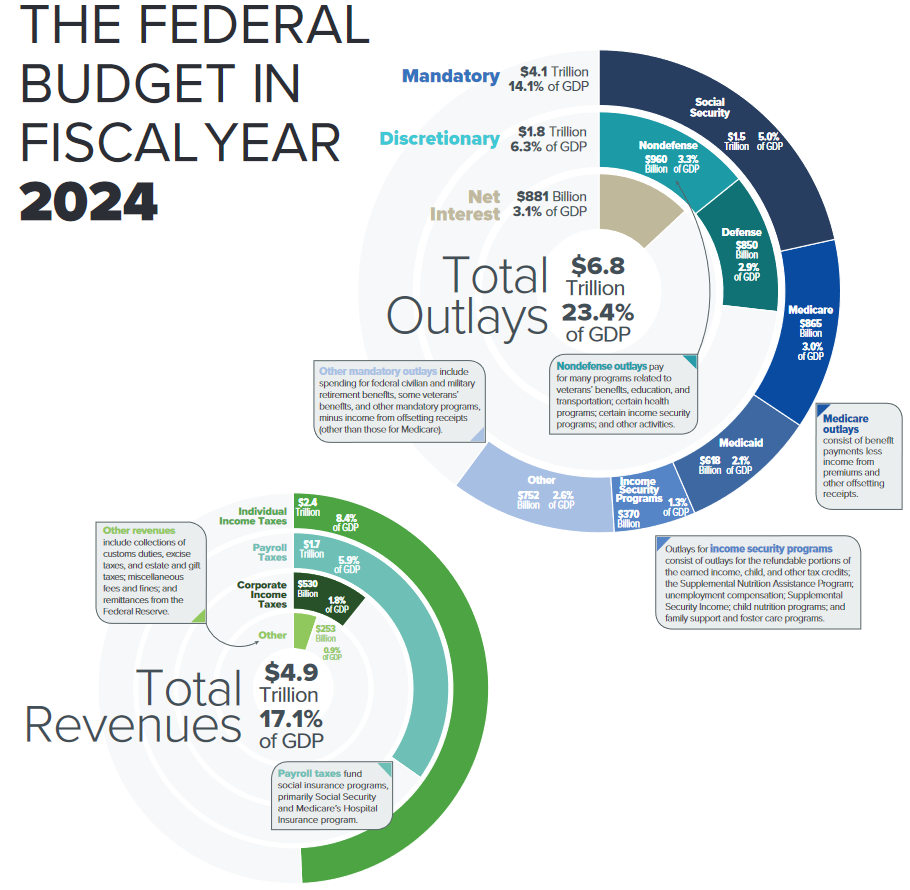
2024 US Federal Budget

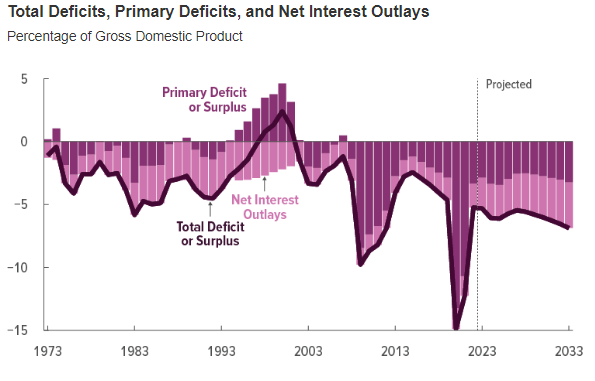
The actual and projected budget deficit of the United States federal budget by the CBO

The United States federal budget comprises the spending and revenues of the U.S. federal government. The budget is the financial representation of the priorities of the government, reflecting historical debates and competing economic philosophies. The government primarily spends on healthcare, retirement, and defense programs. The non-partisan Congressional Budget Office provides extensive analysis of the budget and its economic effects.

The budget typically contains more spending than revenue, the difference adding to the federal debt each year. The CBO estimated in February 2026 that federal debt held by the public is projected to rise from 101% of GDP in 2026 to 120% in 2036, 144% in 2046, and 175% in 2056., assuming current laws remained unchanged. Over that period, mandatory spending was forecast to rise from 14.2% of GDP in 2026 to 15.4% in the first 15 years (to 2041), and to 16.4% by 2056. Discretionary spending would decline from 5.6% to 2.4%, and eventually, 2.3%. Net spending on interest, 3.3% of GDP in 2026, would rise to 6.9% in 2056. On the revenues side, receipts from individual income taxes would rise from 8.6% of GDP to 9.4% in 2041 and 10.1% in 2056. Corporate income taxes would remain at 1.3% of GDP in all but one of those 30 years.

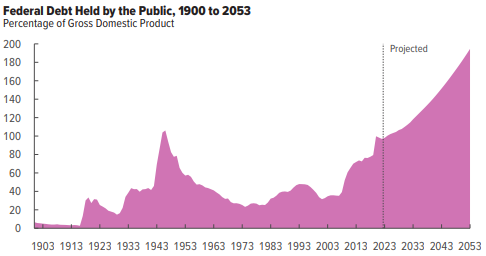
The amount of U.S. public debt, measured as a percentage of GDP, held by the public since 1900

== Overview ==
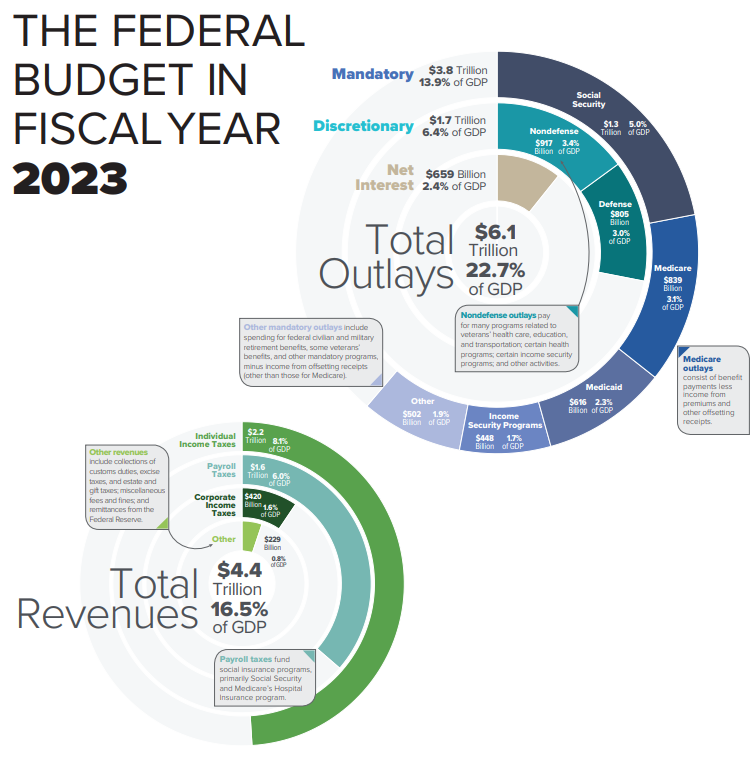
CBO: U.S. Federal spending and revenue components for fiscal year 2023. Major expenditure categories are healthcare, Social Security, and defense. Income and payroll taxes are the primary revenue sources.

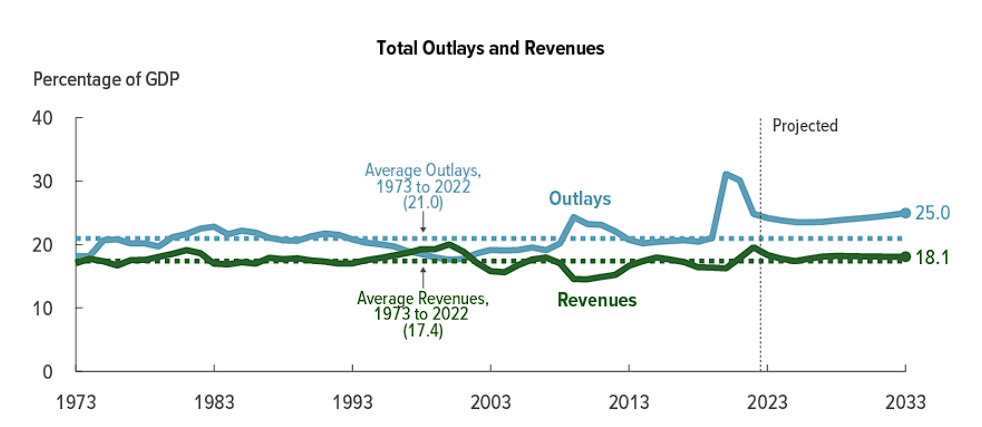
CBO: Revenue and Expense as % GDP. Deficits are projected to grow as a percentage of GDP as the country ages and healthcare costs rise faster than the economy.

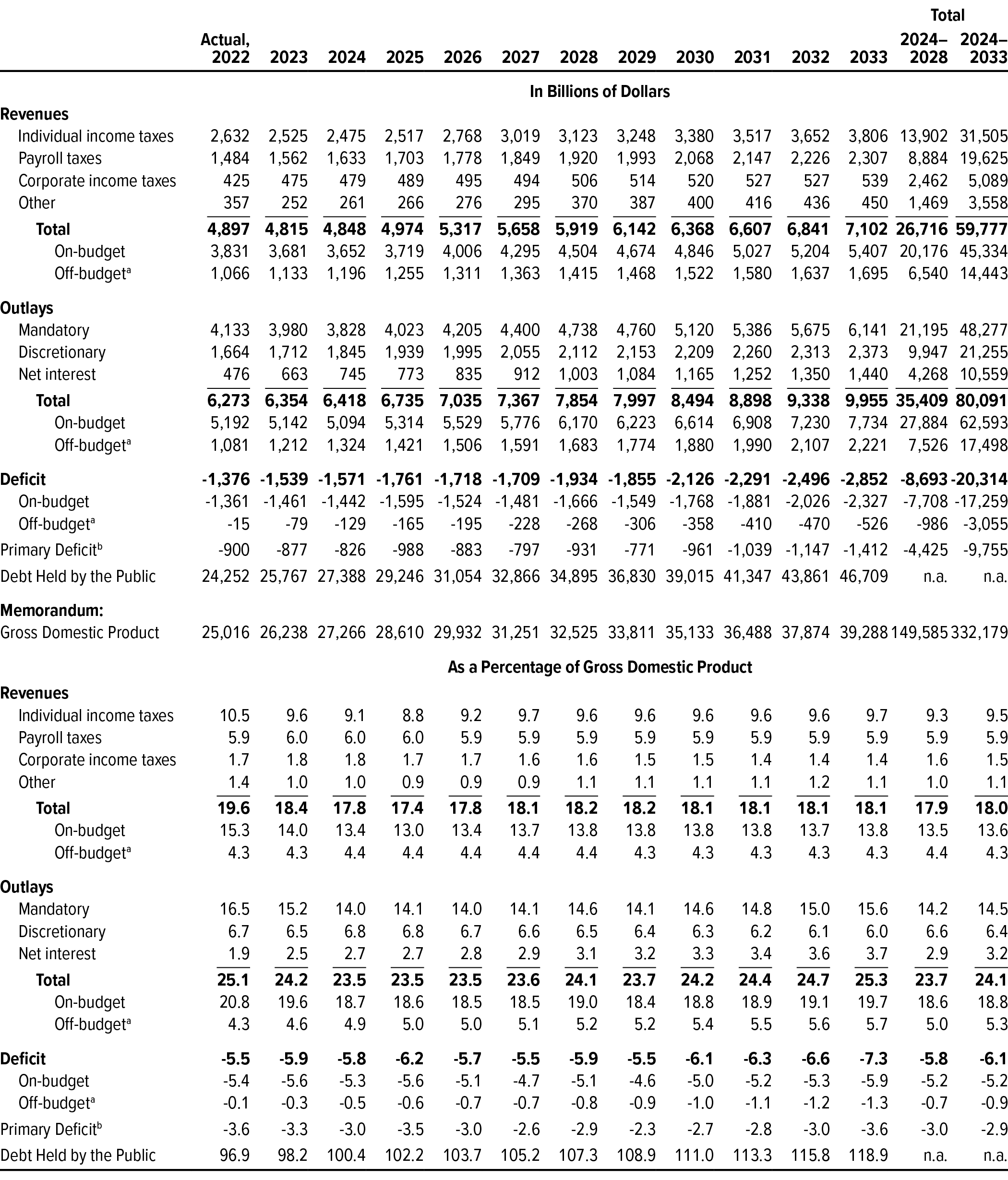
CBO current law baseline as of May 2023, showing forecast of deficit and debt by year

The budget document often begins with the president's proposal to Congress recommending funding levels for the next fiscal year, beginning October 1 and ending on September 30 of the year following. The fiscal year refers to the year in which it ends. However, Congress is the body required by law to pass appropriations annually and to submit funding bills passed by both houses to the president for signature. Congressional decisions are governed by rules and legislation regarding the federal budget process. Budget committees set spending limits for the House and Senate committees and for Appropriations subcommittees, which then approve individual appropriations bills to allocate funding to various federal programs.

If Congress fails to pass an annual budget, then several appropriations bills must be passed as "stop gap" measures. After Congress approves an appropriations bill, it is then sent to the president, who may either sign it into law or veto it. A vetoed bill is sent back to Congress, which can pass it into law with a two-thirds majority in each legislative chamber. Congress may also combine all or some appropriations bills into one omnibus reconciliation bill. In addition, the president may request and the Congress may pass supplemental appropriations bills or emergency supplemental appropriations bills.

Several government agencies provide budget data and analysis. These include the Government Accountability Office (GAO), the Congressional Budget Office (CBO), the Office of Management and Budget (OMB), and the Treasury Department. These agencies have reported that the federal government is facing many important long-run financing challenges, primarily driven by an aging population, rising interest payments, and spending for healthcare programs like Medicare and Medicaid.

During FY2022, the federal government spent $6.3 trillion. Spending as % of GDP is 25.1%, almost 2 percentage points greater than the average over the past 50 years. Major categories of FY 2022 spending included: Medicare and Medicaid ($1.339T or 5.4% of GDP), Social Security ($1.2T or 4.8% of GDP), non-defense discretionary spending used to run federal Departments and Agencies ($910B or 3.6% of GDP), Defense Department ($751B or 3.0% of GDP), and net interest ($475B or 1.9% of GDP).

The federal budget deficit in fiscal year 2025 totaled $1,775 billion, equal to 5.8 percent of GDP. In its February 2026 baseline, CBO had projected a $1.6 trillion deficit, equal to 6.7 percent of GDP, for 2036, or $3,115 billion.

The following table summarizes several budgetary statistics for the fiscal year 2015-2021 periods as a percent of GDP, including federal tax revenue, outlays or spending, deficits (revenue – outlays), and debt held by the public. The historical average for 1969-2018 is also shown. With U.S. GDP of about $21 trillion in 2019, 1% of GDP is about $210 billion. Statistics for 2020-2022 are from the CBO Monthly Budget Review for FY 2022.

Variable As % GDP	2015	2016	2017	2018	2019	2020	2021	2022	Hist Avg
Revenue	18.0%	17.6%	17.2%	16.4%	16.4%	16.2%	17.9%	19.6%	17.4%
Outlays	20.4%	20.8%	20.6%	20.2%	21.0%	31.1%	30.1%	25.1%	21.0%
Budget Deficit	-2.4%	-3.2%	-3.5%	-3.8%	-4.6%	-14.9%	-12.3%	-5.5%	-3.6%
Debt Held by Public	72.5%	76.4%	76.2%	77.6%	79.4%	100.3%	99.6%	94.7%	

== Budget principles ==
The U.S. Constitution (Article I, section 9, clause 7) states that "No money shall be drawn from the Treasury, but in Consequence of Appropriations made by Law; and a regular Statement and Account of Receipts and Expenditures of all public Money shall be published from time to time."

Each year, the president of the United States submits a budget request to Congress for the following fiscal year as required by the Budget and Accounting Act of 1921. Current law (31 U.S.C. § 1105(a)) requires the president to submit a budget no earlier than the first Monday in January, and no later than the first Monday in February. Typically, presidents submit budgets on the first Monday in February. The budget submission has been delayed, however, in some new presidents' first year when the previous president belonged to a different party.

The federal budget is calculated largely on a cash basis. That is, revenues and outlays are recognized when transactions are made. Therefore, the full long-term costs of programs such as Medicare, Social Security, and the federal portion of Medicaid are not reflected in the federal budget. By contrast, many businesses and some other national governments have adopted forms of accrual accounting, which recognizes obligations and revenues when they are incurred. The costs of some federal credit and loan programs, according to provisions of the Federal Credit Reform Act of 1990, are calculated on a net present value basis.

Federal agencies cannot spend money unless funds are authorized and appropriated by law. Like any law, such appropriations must be introduced in Congress as a bill and passed by both the House of Representatives and the Senate and then usually be signed by the president. Typically, separate Congressional committees have jurisdiction over authorization and appropriations. The House and Senate Appropriations Committees currently have 12 subcommittees, which are responsible for drafting the 12 regular appropriations bills that determine amounts of discretionary spending for various federal programs. In many recent years, regular appropriations bills have been combined into "omnibus" bills.

Congress may also pass "special" or "emergency" appropriations. Spending that is deemed an "emergency" is exempt from certain Congressional budget enforcement rules. Funds for disaster relief have sometimes come from supplemental appropriations, such as after Hurricane Katrina. In other cases, funds included in emergency supplemental appropriations bills support activities not obviously related to actual emergencies, such as parts of the 2000 Census of Population and Housing. Special appropriations have been used to fund most of the costs of war and occupation in Iraq and Afghanistan so far.

Budget resolutions and appropriations bills, which reflect spending priorities of Congress, will usually differ from funding levels in the president's budget. The president, however, retains substantial influence over the budget process through veto power and through congressional allies when the president's party has a majority in Congress.

=== Budget authority versus outlays ===
The amount of budget authority and outlays for a fiscal year usually differ because the government can incur obligations for future years. This means that budget authority from a previous fiscal year can, in many cases, be used for expenditure of funds in future fiscal years; for example, a multi-year contract.

Budget authority is the legal authority provided by federal law to enter into financial obligations that will result in immediate or future outlays involving federal government funds. Outlays refer to the issuance of checks, disbursement of cash or electronic transfer of funds made to liquidate a federal obligation and is usually synonymous with "expenditure" or "spending". The term "appropriations" refers to budget authority to incur obligations and to make payments from the Treasury for specified purposes. Some military and some housing programs have multi-year appropriations, in which their budget authority is specified for several coming fiscal years.

In the congressional budgeting process, an "authorization" (technically the "authorization act") provides the legal authority for the executive branch to act, establishes an account which can receive money to implement the action, and sets a limit on how much money may be expended. However, this account remains empty until Congress approves an "appropriation", which requires the U.S. Treasury to provide funds (up to the limit provided for in the authorization). Congress is not required to appropriate as much money as is authorized.

Congress may both authorize and appropriate in the same bill. Known as "authorization bills", such legislation usually provides for a multi-year authorization and appropriation. Authorization bills are particularly useful when funding entitlement programs (benefits which federal law says an individual has a right to, regardless if any money is appropriated), where estimating the amount of funds to be spent is difficult. Authorization bills are also useful when giving a federal agency the right to borrow money, sign contracts, or provide loan guarantees. In 2007, two-thirds of all federal spending came through authorization bills.

A "backdoor authorization" occurs when an appropriation is made and an agency required to spend the money even when no authorizing legislation has been enacted. A "backdoor appropriation" occurs when authorizing legislation requires an agency to spend a specific amount of money on a specific project within a specific period of time. Because the agency would be violating the law if it did not do so, it is required to spend the money—even if no appropriation has been made. Backdoor appropriations are particularly vexsome because removing the appropriation requires amending federal law, which is often politically impossible to do within a short period of time. Backdoor authorizations and appropriations are sources of significant friction in Congress. Authorization and appropriations committees jealously guard their legislative rights, and the congressional budgeting process can break down when committees overstep their boundaries and are retaliated against.

=== Federal budget data ===
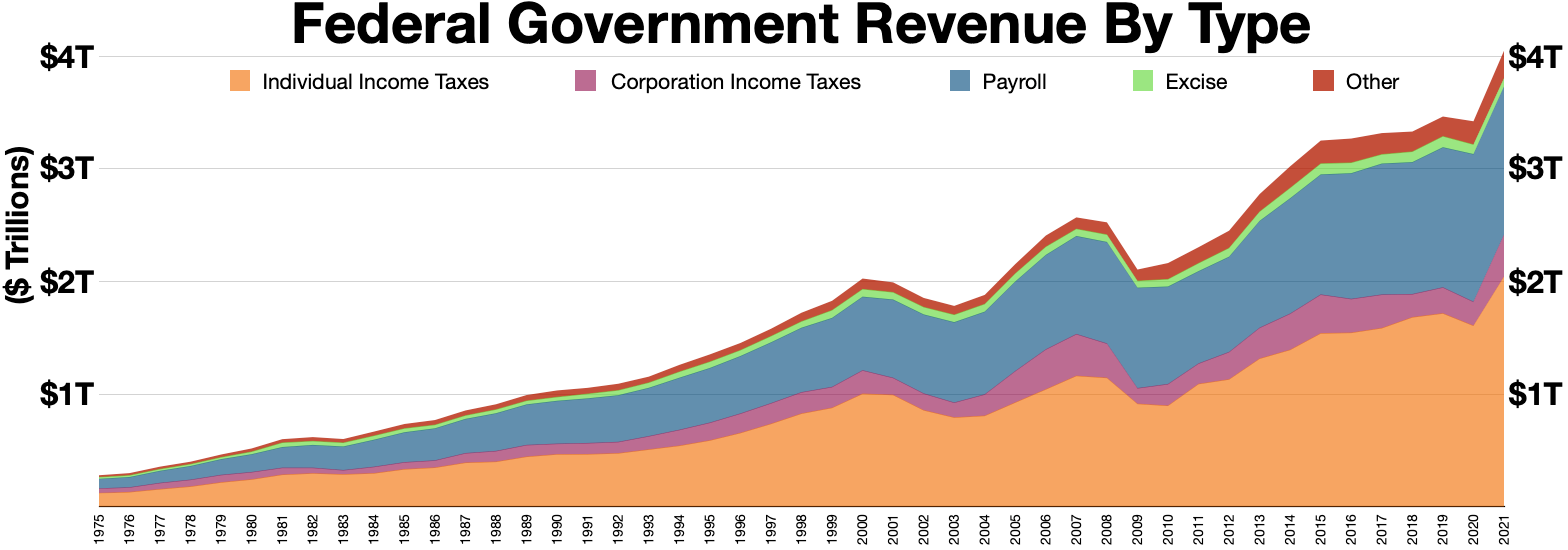
Federal Government revenue by type Other Excise tax Payroll tax Corporate tax Personal Income Tax

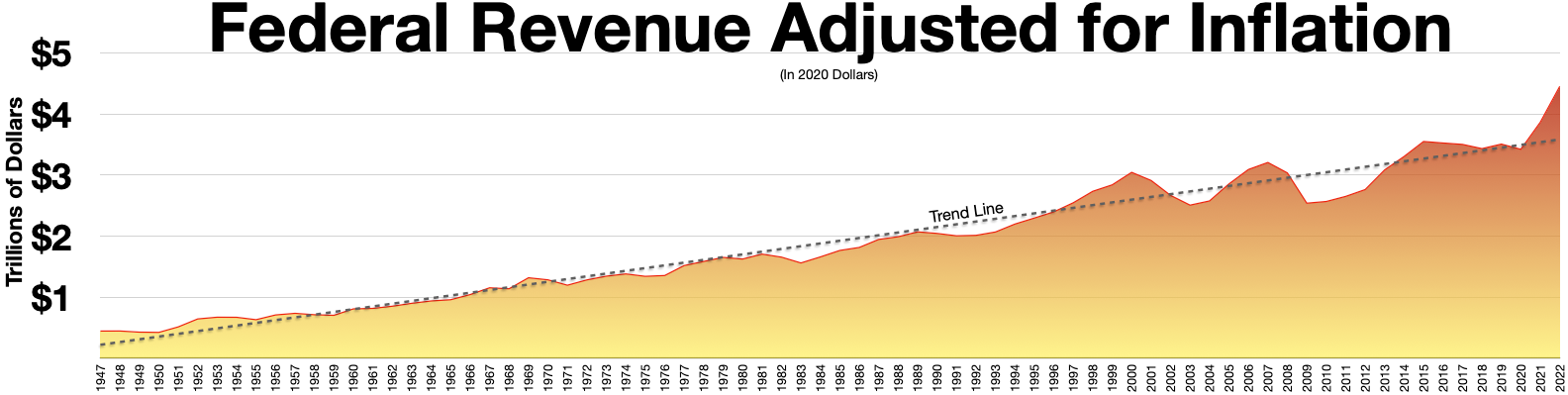
Federal revenue adjusted for inflation (2020 Dollars) Trend line

Table compares US federal spending and revenue in 2019 vs. 2018 using CBO historical data.

Several government agencies provide budget data. These include the Government Accountability Office (GAO), the Congressional Budget Office (CBO), the Office of Management and Budget (OMB) and the U.S. Treasury Department. The CBO publishes The Budget and Economic Outlook in January, which covers a ten-year window and is typically updated in August. It also publishes a Long-Term Budget Outlook in July and a Monthly Budget Review. The OMB, which is responsible for organizing the president's budget presented in February, typically issues a budget update in July. The GAO and the Treasury issue Financial Statements of the U.S. Government, usually in the December following the close of the federal fiscal year, which occurs September 30. There is a corresponding Citizen's Guide, a short summary. The Treasury Department also produces a Combined Statement of Receipts, Outlays, and Balances each December for the preceding fiscal year, which provides detailed data on federal financial activities.

Historical tables within the president's budget (OMB) provide a wide range of data on federal government finances. Many of the data series begin in 1940 and include estimates of the president's budget for 2018–2023. Additionally, Table 1.1 provides data on receipts, outlays, and surpluses or deficits for 1901–1939 and for earlier multi-year periods. This document is composed of 17 sections, each of which has one or more tables. Each section covers a common theme. Section 1, for example, provides an overview of the budget and off-budget totals; Section 2 provides tables on receipts by source; and Section 3 shows outlays by function. When a section contains several tables, the general rule is to start with tables showing the broadest overview data and then work down to more detailed tables. The purpose of these tables is to present a broad range of historical budgetary data in one convenient reference source and to provide relevant comparisons likely to be most useful. The most common comparisons are in terms of proportions (e.g., each major receipt category as a percentage of total receipts and of the gross domestic product).

=== Federal budget projections ===
The Congressional Budget Office (CBO) projects budget data such as revenues, expenses, deficits, and debt as part of its "Long-term Budget Outlook" which is released annually. The 2018 Outlook included projections for debt through 2048 and beyond. CBO outlined several scenarios that result in a range of outcomes. The "Extended Baseline" scenario and "Extended Alternative Fiscal" scenario both result in a much higher level of debt relative to the size of the economy (GDP) as the country ages and healthcare costs rise faster than the rate of economic growth. CBO also identified scenarios involving significant austerity measures, which maintain or reduce the debt relative to GDP over time.

CBO estimated the size of changes that would be needed to achieve a chosen goal for federal debt. For example, if lawmakers wanted to reduce the amount of debt in 2048 to 41 percent of GDP (its average over the past 50 years), they might cut non-interest spending, increase revenues, or take a combination of both approaches to make changes that equaled 3.0 percent of GDP each year starting in 2019. (In dollar terms, that amount would total about $630 billion in 2019.) If, instead, policymakers wanted debt in 2048 to equal its current share of GDP (78 percent), the necessary changes would be smaller (although still substantial), totaling 1.9 percent of GDP per year (or about $400 billion in 2019). The longer lawmakers waited to act, the larger the policy changes would need to be to reach any particular goal for federal debt.

== Government revenue ==
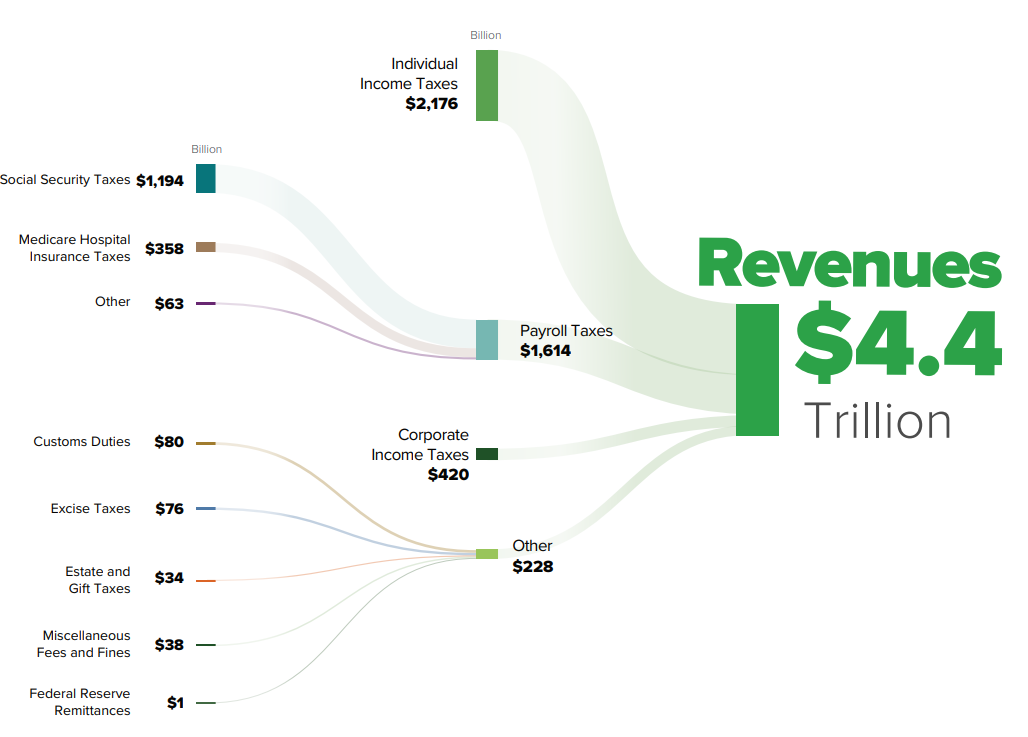
Breakdown of revenues for US Federal Government in 2023

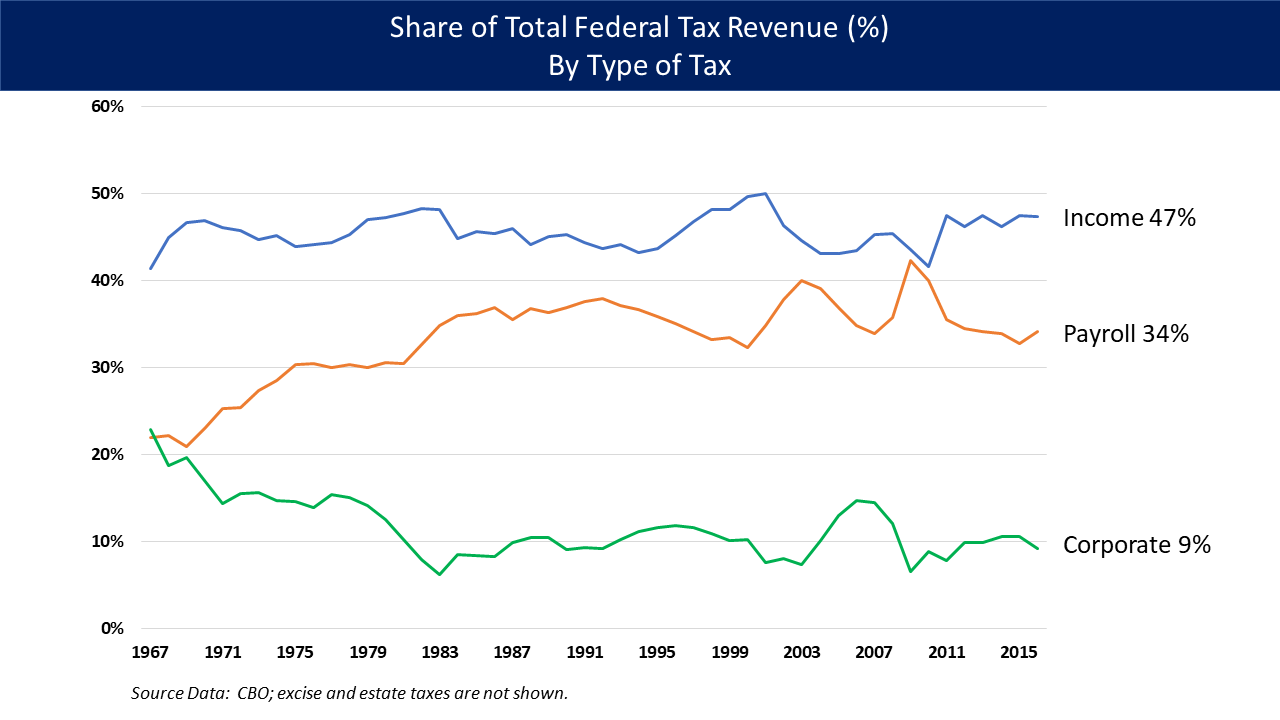
CBO data on share of U.S. federal revenues collected by tax type from 1967 to 2016. Payroll taxes, paid by all wage earners, have increased as a share of total federal tax revenues, while corporate taxes have fallen. Income taxes have moved in a range, with Presidents Reagan and G.W. Bush lowering income tax rates, and Clinton and Obama raising them for the top incomes.

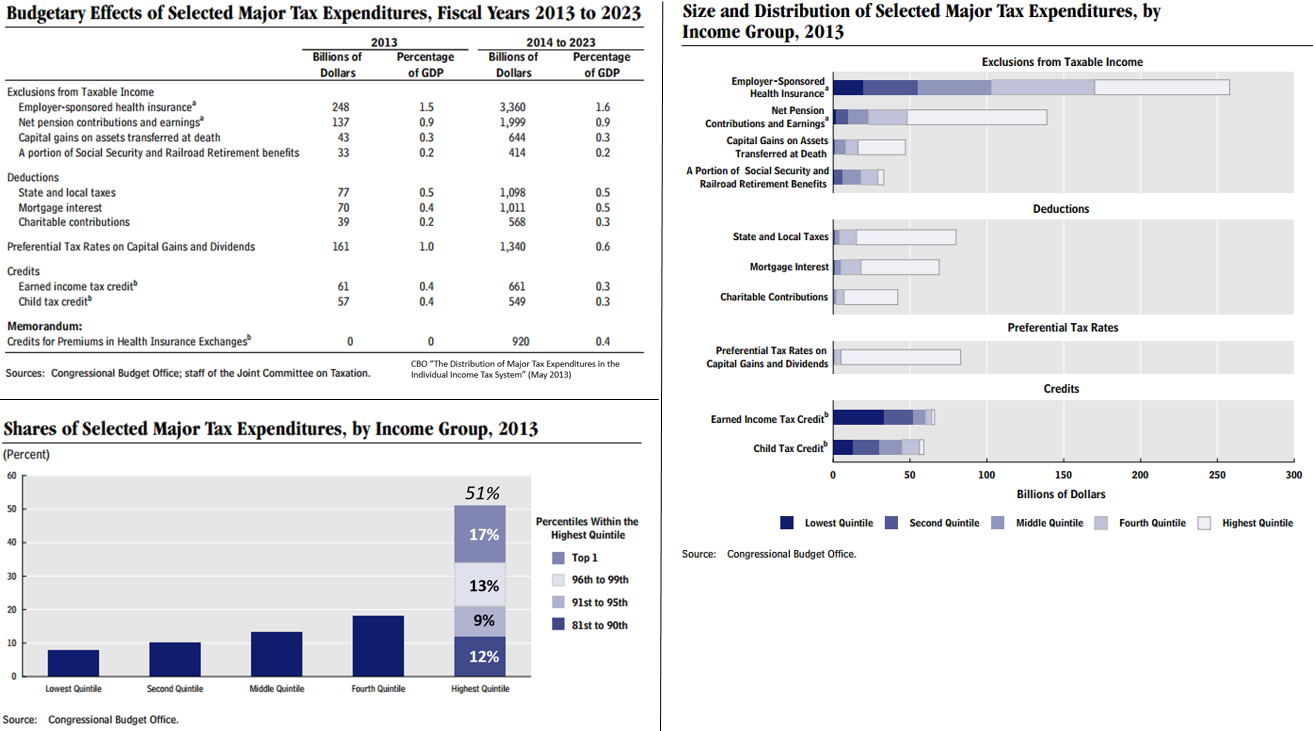
CBO charts describing about $1.0 trillion in tax expenditures during 2013 (i.e., exemptions, deductions, and preferential rates) and their distribution across income groups. The top 20% of income earners received 50% of the benefit from these tax breaks; they also pay approximately 70% of federal income taxes.

During FY2018, the federal government collected approximately $3.33 trillion in tax revenue, up $14 billion or less than 1% versus FY2017. Primary receipt categories included individual income taxes ($1,684B or 51% of total receipts), Social Security/Social Insurance taxes ($1,171B or 35%), and corporate taxes ($205B or 6%). Corporate tax revenues declined by $92 billion or 32% due to the Tax Cuts and Jobs Act. Other revenue types included excise, estate and gift taxes. FY 2018 revenues were 16.4% of gross domestic product (GDP), versus 17.2% in FY 2017. Tax revenues averaged approximately 17.4% GDP over the 1980-2017 period.

During FY2017, the federal government collected approximately $3.32 trillion in tax revenue, up $48 billion or 1.5% versus FY2016. Primary receipt categories included individual income taxes ($1,587B or 48% of total receipts), Social Security/Social Insurance taxes ($1,162B or 35%), and corporate taxes ($297B or 9%). Other revenue types included excise, estate and gift taxes. FY 2017 revenues were 17.3% of gross domestic product (GDP), versus 17.7% in FY 2016. Tax revenues averaged approximately 17.4% GDP over the 1980-2017 period.

Tax revenues are significantly affected by the economy. Recessions typically reduce government tax collections as economic activity slows. For example, tax revenues declined from $2.5 trillion in 2008 to $2.1 trillion in 2009, and remained at that level in 2010. From 2008 to 2009, individual income taxes declined 20%, while corporate taxes declined 50%. At 14.6% of GDP, the 2009 and 2010 collections were the lowest level of the past 50 years.

=== Tax policy ===
==== Tax descriptions ====
The federal personal income tax is progressive, meaning a higher marginal tax rate is applied to higher ranges of income. For example, in 2010 the tax rate that applied to the first $17,000 in taxable income for a couple filing jointly was 10%, while the rate applied to income over $379,150 was 35%. The top marginal tax rate has declined considerably since 1980. For example, the top tax rate was lowered from 70% to 50% in 1980 and reached as low as 28% in 1988. The Bush tax cuts of 2001 and 2003, extended by President Obama in 2010, lowered the top rate from 39.6% to 35%. The American Taxpayer Relief Act of 2012 raised the income tax rates for individuals earning over $400,000 and couples over $450,000. There are numerous exemptions and deductions, that typically result in a range of 35–40% of U.S. households owing no federal income tax. The recession and tax cut stimulus measures increased this to 51% for 2009, versus 38% in 2007. In 2011 it was found that 46% of households paid no federal income tax, however the top 1% contributed about 25% of total taxes collected. In 2014, the top 1% paid approximately 46% of the federal income taxes, excluding payroll taxes.

The federal payroll tax (FICA) partially funds Social Security and Medicare. For the Social Security portion, employers and employees each pay 6.2% of the workers gross pay, a total of 12.4%. The Social Security portion is capped at $118,500 for 2015, meaning income above this amount is not subject to the tax. It is a flat tax up to the cap, but regressive overall as it is not applied to higher incomes. The Medicare portion is also paid by employer and employee each at 1.45% and is not capped. Starting in 2013, an additional 0.9 percent more in Medicare taxes was applied to income of more than $200,000 ($250,000 for married couples filing jointly), making it a progressive tax overall.

For calendar years 2011 and 2012, the employee's portion of the payroll tax was reduced to 4.2% as an economic stimulus measure; this expired for 2013. Approximately 65% percent of tax return filers pay more in payroll taxes than income taxes.

==== Tax expenditures ====
The term "tax expenditures" refers to income exclusions, deductions, preferential rates, and credits that reduce revenues for any given level of tax rates in the individual, payroll, and corporate income tax systems. Like conventional spending, they contribute to the federal budget deficit. They also influence choices about working, saving, and investing, and affect the distribution of income. The amount of reduced federal revenues are significant, estimated by CBO at nearly 8% GDP or about $1.5 trillion in 2017, for scale roughly half the revenue collected by the government and nearly three times as large as the budget deficit. Since eliminating a tax expenditure changes economic behavior, the amount of additional revenue that would be generated is somewhat less than the estimated size of the tax expenditure.

CBO reported that the following were among the largest individual (non-corporate) tax expenditures in 2013:

- $248B – The exclusion from workers’ taxable income of employers’ contributions for health care, health insurance premiums, and premiums for long-term care insurance;
- $137B – The exclusion of contributions to and the earnings of pension funds such as 401k plans;
- $161B – Preferential tax rates on dividends and long-term capital gains;
- $77B – The deductions for state and local taxes;
- $70B – The deductions for mortgage interest.

In 2013, CBO estimated that more than half of the combined benefits of 10 major tax expenditures would apply to households in the top 20% income group, and that 17% of the benefit would go to the top 1% households. The top 20% of income earners pay about 70% of federal income taxes, excluding payroll taxes. For scale, 50% of the $1.5 trillion in tax expenditures in 2016 was $750 billion, while the U.S. budget deficit was approximately $600 billion. In other words, eliminating the tax expenditures for the top 20% might balance the budget over the short-term, depending on economic feedback effects.

== Government spending ==
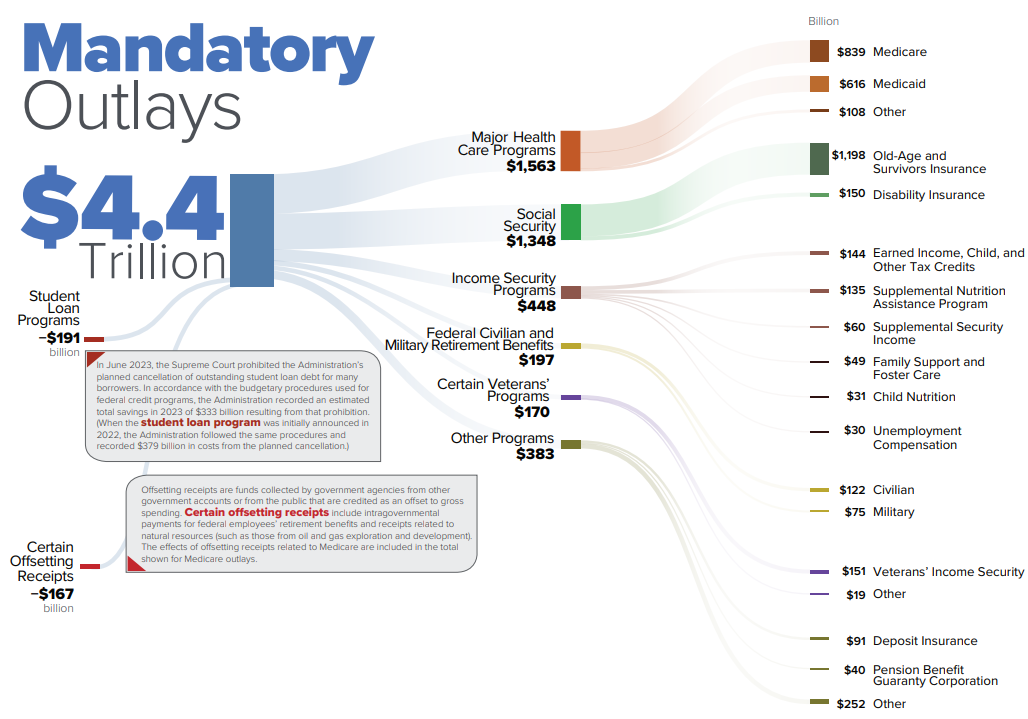
Mandatory spending of the US Federal Government in 2023

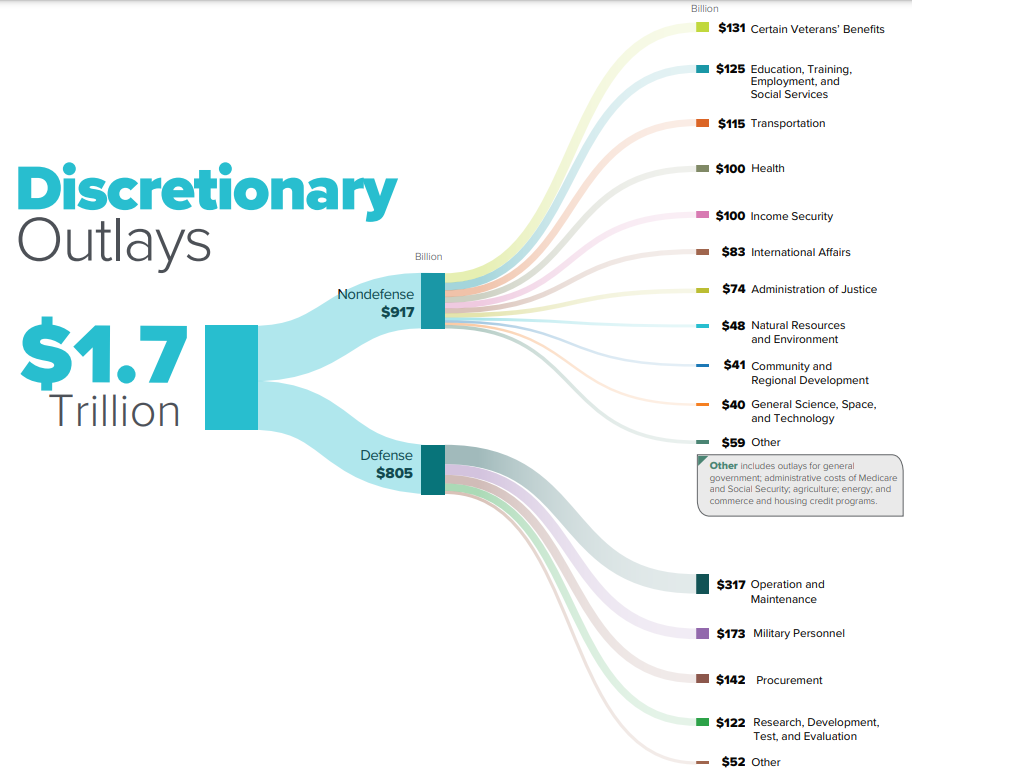
Breakdown of discretionary outlays of US Federal Government for 2023

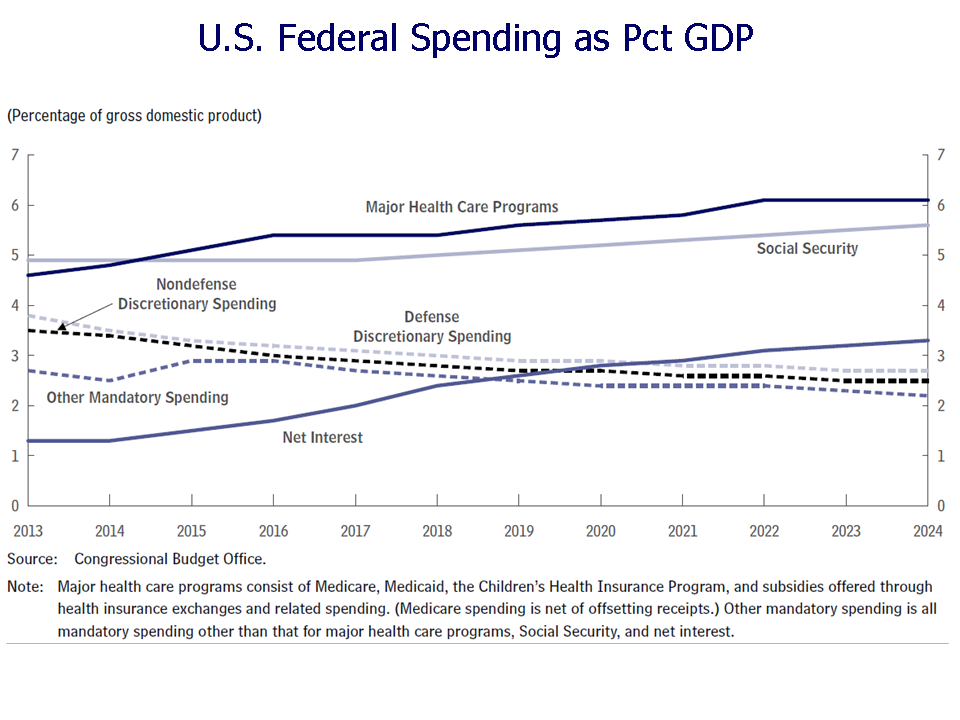
CBO projections of U.S. Federal spending as % GDP 2014-2024

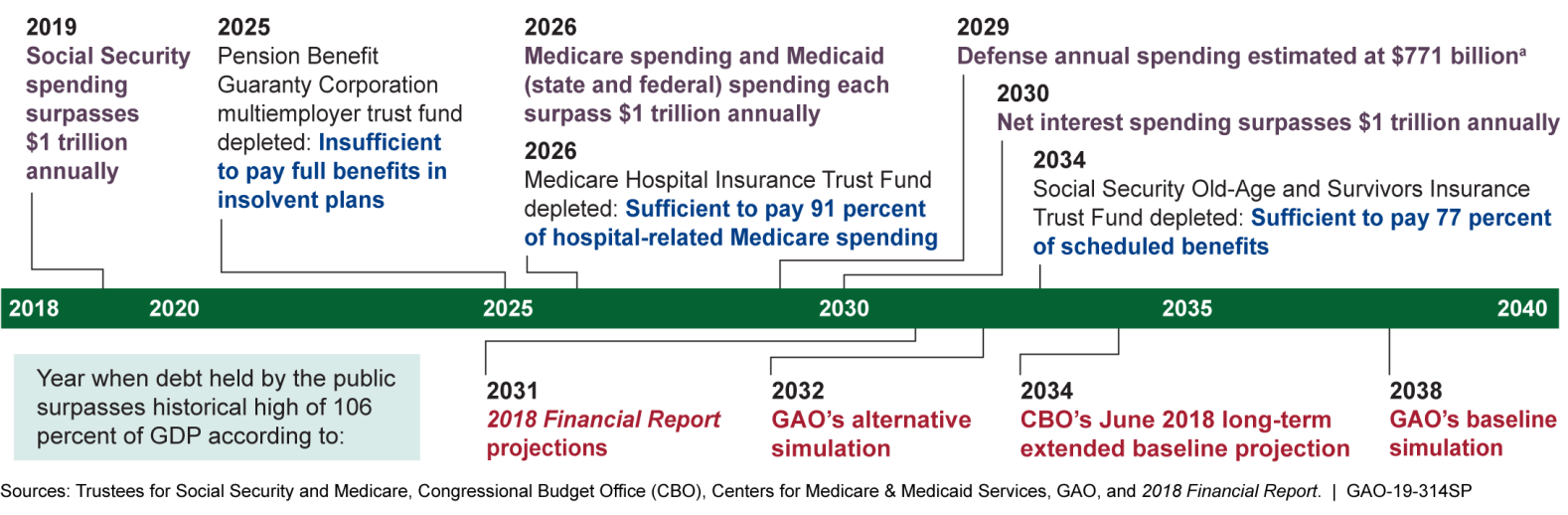
A timeline showing projected debt milestones from the CBO

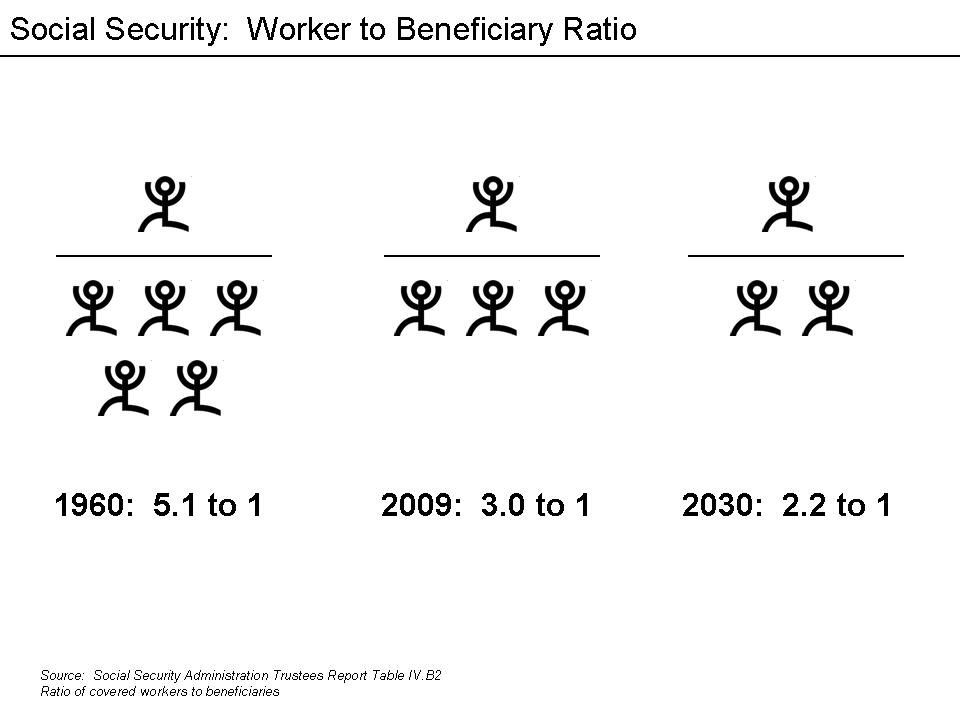
Social Security – Ratio of Covered Workers to Retirees. Over time, there will be fewer workers per retiree.

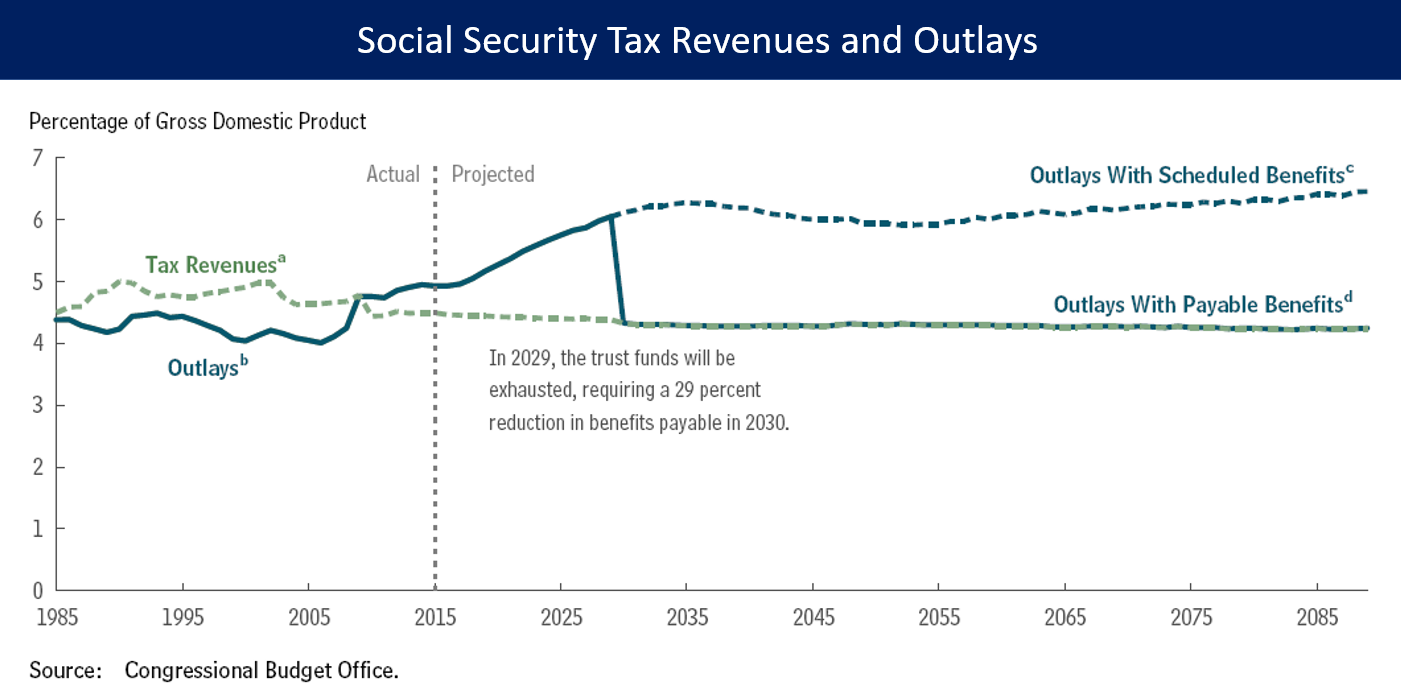
CBO forecast of Social Security tax revenues and outlays from 2015 to 2085. Under current law, the outlays are projected to exceed revenues, requiring a 29% reduction in program payments starting around 2030 once the Social Security Trust Fund is exhausted.

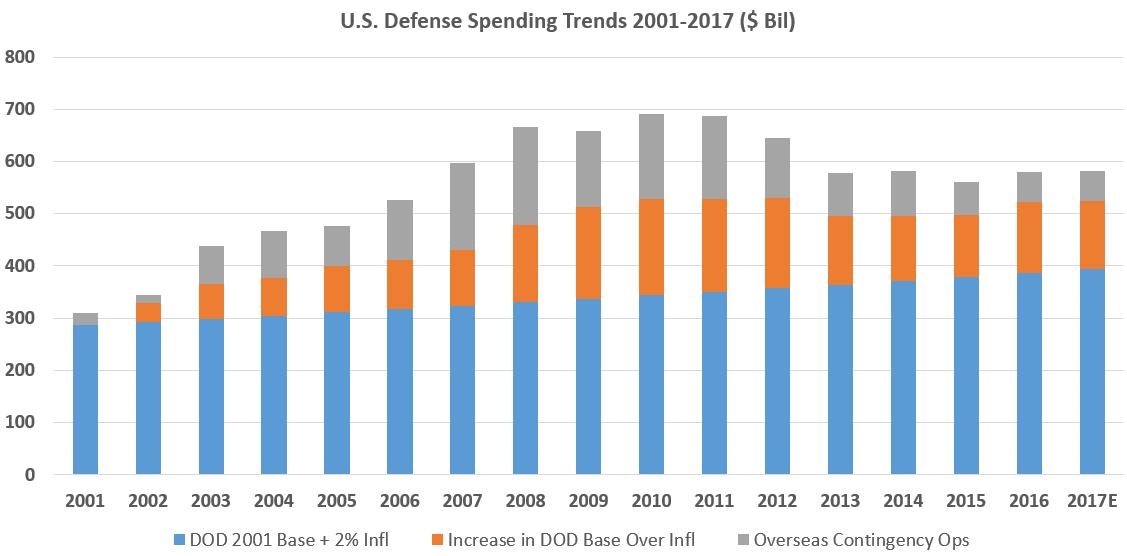
Defense Spending 2001–2017

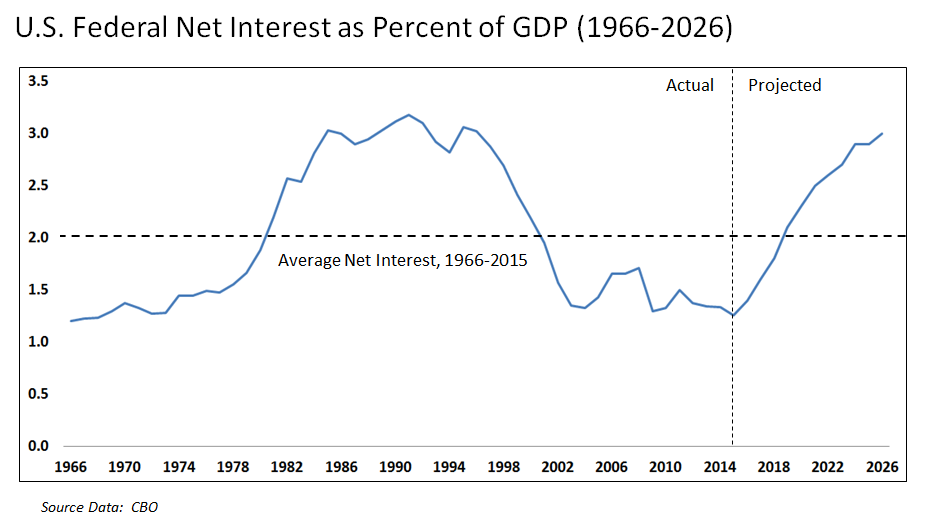
Interest to GDP, a measure of debt burden, was very low in 2015 but is projected to rise with both interest rates and debt levels over the 2016-2026 period.

During FY2018, the federal government spent $4.11 trillion, up $127 billion or 3.2% vs. FY2017 spending of $3.99 trillion. Spending increased for all major categories and was mainly driven by higher spending for Social Security, net interest on the debt, and defense. Spending as % GDP fell from 20.7% GDP to 20.3% GDP, equal to the 50-year average.

During FY2017, the federal government spent $3.98 trillion, up $128 billion or 3.3% vs. FY2016 spending of $3.85 trillion. Major categories of FY 2017 spending included: Healthcare such as Medicare and Medicaid ($1,077B or 27% of spending), Social Security ($939B or 24%), non-defense discretionary spending used to run federal Departments and Agencies ($610B or 15%), Defense Department ($590B or 15%), and interest ($263B or 7%).

Expenditures are classified as "mandatory", with payments required by specific laws to those meeting eligibility criteria (e.g., Social Security and Medicare), or "discretionary", with payment amounts renewed annually as part of the budget process. Around two thirds of federal spending is for "mandatory" programs. CBO projects that mandatory program spending and interest costs will rise relative to GDP over the 2016–2026 period, while defense and other discretionary spending will decline relative to GDP.

=== Mandatory spending and social safety nets ===
Social Security, Medicare, and Medicaid expenditures are funded by more permanent Congressional appropriations and so are considered mandatory spending. Social Security and Medicare are sometimes called "entitlements", because people meeting relevant eligibility requirements are legally entitled to benefits; most pay taxes into these programs throughout their working lives. Some programs, such as Food Stamps, are appropriated entitlements. Some mandatory spending, such as Congressional salaries, is not part of any entitlement program. Mandatory spending accounted for 59.8% of total federal outlays (net of receipts that partially pay for the programs), with net interest payments accounting for an additional 6.5%. In 2000, these were 53.2% and 12.5%, respectively.

Mandatory spending is expected to continue increasing as a share of GDP. This is due in part to demographic trends, as the number of workers continues declining relative to those receiving benefits. For example, the number of workers per retiree was 5.1 in 1960; this declined to 3.0 in 2010 and is projected to decline to 2.2 by 2030. These programs are also affected by per-person costs, which are also expected to increase at a rate significantly higher than economic growth. This unfavorable combination of demographics and per-capita rate increases is expected to drive both Social Security and Medicare into large deficits during the 21st century. Unless these long-term fiscal imbalances are addressed by reforms to these programs, raising taxes or drastic cuts in discretionary programs, the federal government will at some point be unable to pay its obligations without significant risk to the value of the dollar (inflation). By one estimate, 70% of the growth in these entitlement expenses over the 2016-2046 period is due to healthcare.

- Medicare was established in 1965 and expanded thereafter. Spending for Medicare during 2016 was $692 billion, versus $634 billion in 2014, an increase of $58 billion or 9%. In 2013, the program covered an estimated 52.3 million persons. It consists of four distinct parts which are funded differently: Hospital Insurance, mainly funded by a dedicated payroll tax of 2.9% of earnings, shared equally between employers and workers; Supplementary Medical Insurance, funded through beneficiary premiums (set at 25% of estimated program costs for the aged) and general revenues (the remaining amount, approximately 75%); Medicare Advantage, a private plan option for beneficiaries, funded through the Hospital Insurance and Supplementary Medical Insurance trust funds; and the Part D prescription drug benefits, for which funding is included in the Supplementary Medical Insurance trust fund and is financed through beneficiary premiums (about 25%) and general revenues (about 75%). Spending on Medicare and Medicaid is projected to grow dramatically in coming decades. The number of persons enrolled in Medicare is expected to increase from 47 million in 2010 to 80 million by 2030. While the same demographic trends that affect Social Security also affect Medicare, rapidly rising medical prices appear to be a more important cause of projected spending increases. CBO expects Medicare and Medicaid to continue growing, rising from 5.3% GDP in 2009 to 10.0% in 2035 and 19.0% by 2082. CBO has indicated healthcare spending per beneficiary is the primary long-term fiscal challenge. Various reform strategies were proposed for healthcare, and in March 2010, the Patient Protection and Affordable Care Act was enacted as a means of health care reform. CBO reduced its per capita Medicare spending assumptions by $1,000 for 2014 and $2,300 for 2019, relative to its 2010 estimate for those years. If this trend continues, it will significantly improve the long-term budget outlook.
- Social Security is a social insurance program officially called "Old-Age, Survivors, and Disability Insurance" (OASDI), in reference to its three components. It is primarily funded through a dedicated payroll tax of 12.4%. During 2016, total benefits of $910 billion were paid out, versus $882 billion in 2015, an increase of $28 billion or 3%. Social Security's total expenditures have exceeded its non-interest income since 2010. The deficit of non-interest income relative to cost was about $49 billion in 2010, $45 billion in 2011, and $55 billion in 2012. During 2010, an estimated 157 million people paid into the program and 54 million received benefits, roughly 2.91 workers per beneficiary. Since the Greenspan Commission in the early 1980s, Social Security has cumulatively collected far more in payroll taxes dedicated to the program than it has paid out to recipients—nearly $2.6 trillion in 2010. This annual surplus is credited to Social Security trust funds that hold special non-marketable Treasury securities. This surplus amount is commonly referred to as the "Social Security Trust Fund." The proceeds are paid into the U.S. Treasury where they may be used for other government purposes. Social Security spending will increase sharply over the next decades, largely due to the retirement of the baby boomer generation. The number of program recipients is expected to increase from 44 million in 2010 to 73 million in 2030. Program spending is projected to rise from 4.8% of GDP in 2010 to 5.9% of GDP by 2030, where it will stabilize. The Social Security Administration projects that an increase in payroll taxes equivalent to 1.8% of the payroll tax base or 0.6% of GDP would be necessary to put the Social Security program in fiscal balance for the next 75 years. Over an infinite time horizon, these shortfalls average 3.3% of the payroll tax base and 1.2% of GDP. Various reforms have been debated for Social Security. Examples include reducing future annual cost of living adjustments (COLA) provided to recipients, raising the retirement age, and raising the income limit subject to the payroll tax ($118,500 in 2014). Because of the mandatory nature of the program and large accumulated surplus in the Social Security Trust Fund, the Social Security system has the legal authority to compel the government to borrow to pay all promised benefits through 2036, when the Trust Fund is expected to be exhausted. Thereafter, the program under current law will pay approximately 75–78% of promised benefits for the remainder of the century.

=== Discretionary spending ===
- Military spending: During 2016, the Department of Defense spent $585 billion, an increase of $1 billion versus 2015. This is a partial measure of all defense-related spending. The military budget of the United States during FY 2014 was approximately $582 billion in expenses for the Department of Defense (DoD), $149 billion for the Department of Veterans Affairs, and $43 billion for the Department of Homeland Security, for a total of $770 billion. This was approximately $33 billion or 4.1% below 2013 spending. DoD spending has fallen from a peak of $678 billion in 2011. The U.S. defense budget (excluding spending for the wars in Iraq and Afghanistan, Homeland Security, and Veteran's Affairs) is around 4% of GDP. Adding these other costs places defense spending around 5% GDP. The DoD baseline budget, excluding supplemental funding for the wars, grew from $297 billion in FY2001 to a budgeted $534 billion for FY2010, an 81% increase. According to the CBO, defense spending grew 9% annually on average from fiscal years 2000–2009. Much of the costs for the wars in Iraq and Afghanistan have not been funded through regular appropriations bills, but through emergency supplemental appropriations bills. As such, most of these expenses were not included in the military budget calculation prior to FY2010. Some budget experts argue that emergency supplemental appropriations bills do not receive the same level of legislative care as regular appropriations bills. During 2011, the U.S. spent more on its military budget than the next 13 countries combined.

Further information: List of countries with highest military expenditures

Military spending, top 25 countries by % GDP, 2024
Country	% GDP spent on military
Ukraine	34.5
Israel	8.8
Algeria	8.0
Saudi Arabia	7.3
Russia	7.1
Myanmar	6.8
Oman	5.6
Armenia	5.5
Azerbaijan	5.0
Kuwait	4.8
Jordan	4.8
Burkina Faso	4.7
Mali	4.2
Poland	4.2
Burundi	3.8
Brunei	3.6
Morocco	3.5
United States	3.4
Estonia	3.4
Colombia	3.4
Latvia	3.3
Greece	3.1
Lithuania	3.1
Chad	3.0
Kyrgyzstan	3.0

Military spending, top 25 countries by PPP, 2024
Country	$billions spent on military
United States	997
China	567
Russia	401
India	308
Ukraine	183
South Korea	96
Germany	99
Japan	91
France	91
United Kingdom	86
Brazil	64
Poland	62
Italy	60
Turkey	59
Indonesia	47
Colombia	43
Mexico	40
Spain	39
Australia	31
Canada	31
Netherlands	21
Philippines	21
Romania	21
Greece	17
Malaysia	14

- Non-defense discretionary spending is used to fund the executive departments (e.g., the Department of Education) and independent agencies (e.g., the Environmental Protection Agency), although these do receive a smaller amount of mandatory funding as well. Discretionary budget authority is established annually by Congress, as opposed to mandatory spending that is required by laws that span multiple years, such as Social Security or Medicare. The federal government spent approximately $600 billion during 2016 on the Cabinet Departments and Agencies, excluding the Department of Defense, up $15 billion or 3% versus 2015. This represented 16% of budgeted expenditures or about 3.3% of GDP. Spending is below the recent dollar peak of $658 billion in 2010.

=== Interest expense ===
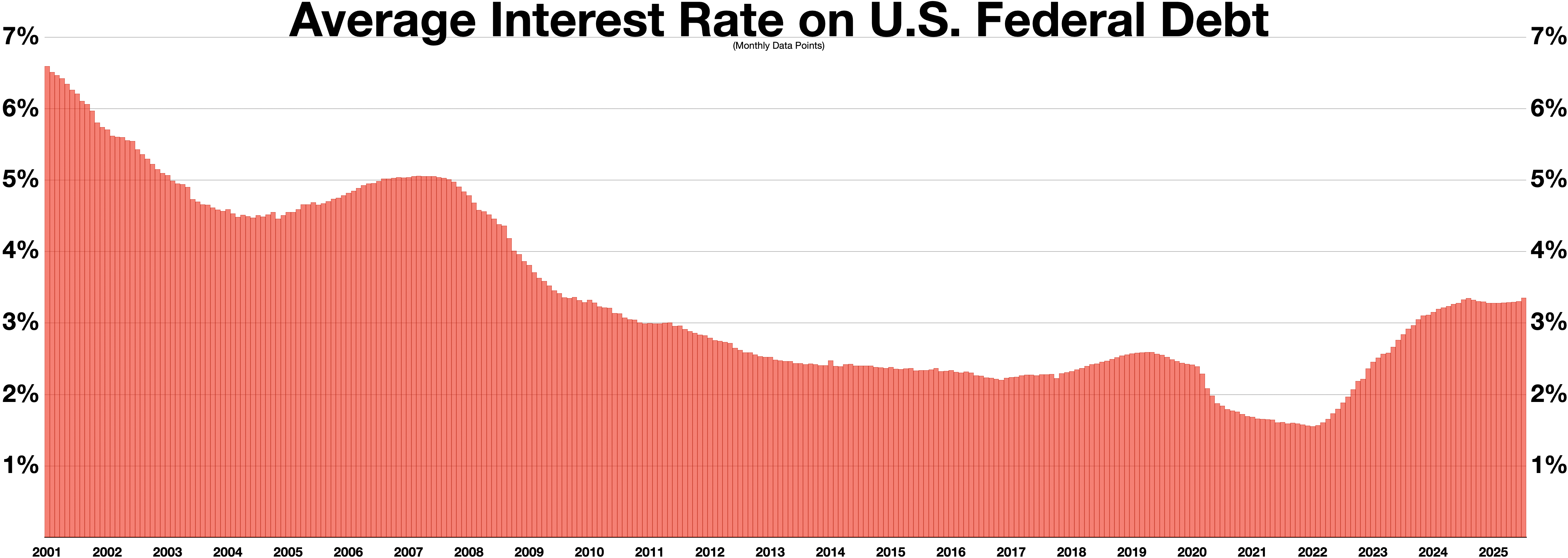
Average interest rate on U.S. Federal debt

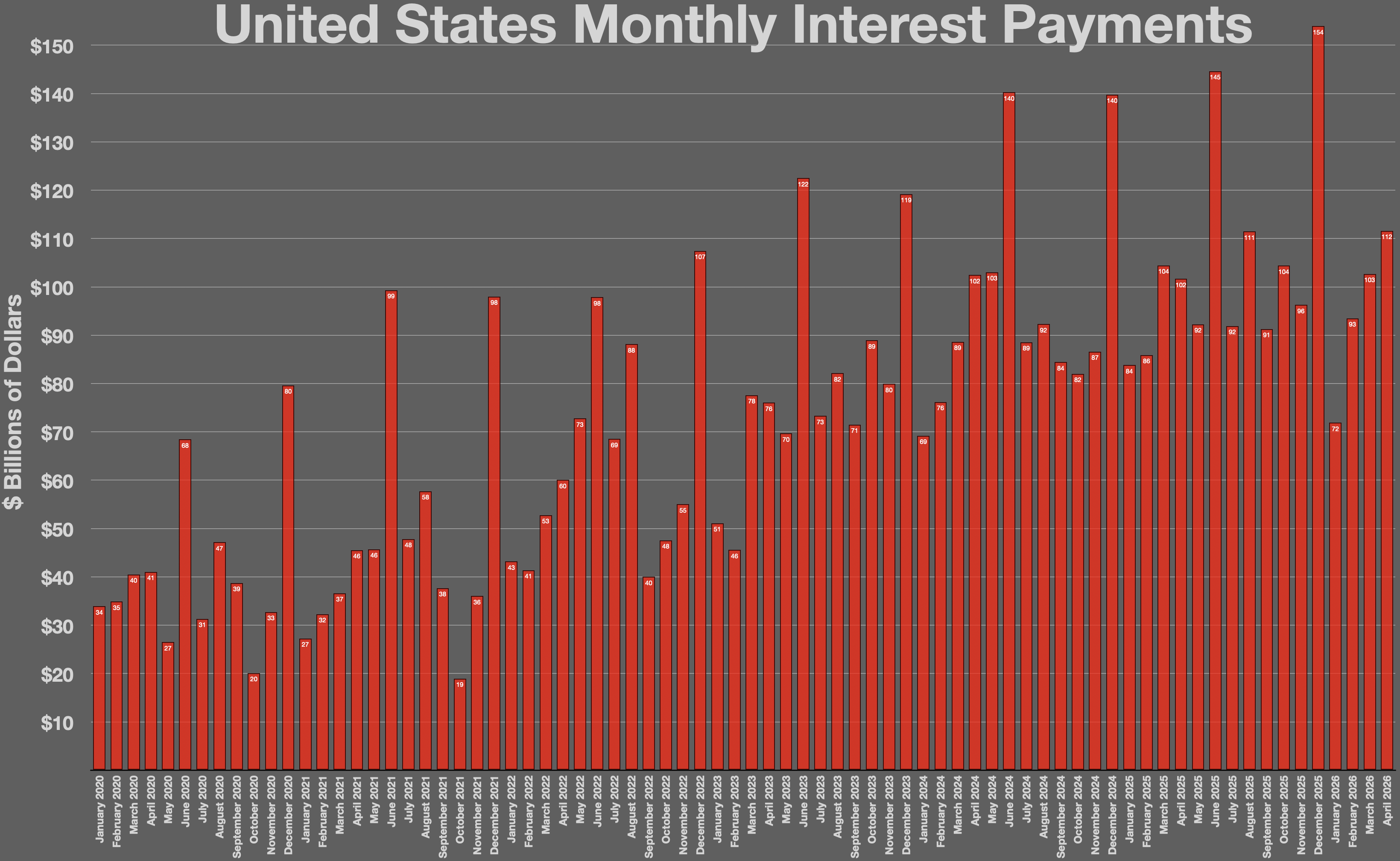
United States monthly interest payments

CBO reported that net interest on the public debt was approximately $240 billion in FY2016 (6% of spending), an increase of $17 billion or 8% versus FY2015. A higher level of debt coincided with higher interest rates. During FY2012, the GAO reported a figure of $245 billion, down from $251 billion. Government also accrued a non-cash interest expense of $187 billion for intragovernmental debt, primarily the Social Security Trust Fund, for a total interest expense of $432 billion. GAO reported that even though the national debt rose in FY2012, the interest rate paid declined. Should interest rates rise to historical averages, the interest cost would increase dramatically.

As of January 2012, public debt owned by foreigners has increased to approximately 50% of the total or approximately $5.0 trillion. As a result, nearly 50% of the interest payments are now leaving the country, which is different from past years when interest was paid to U.S. citizens holding the public debt. Interest expenses are projected to grow dramatically as the U.S. debt increases and interest rates rise from very low levels to more typical historical levels.

== Deficits and debt ==
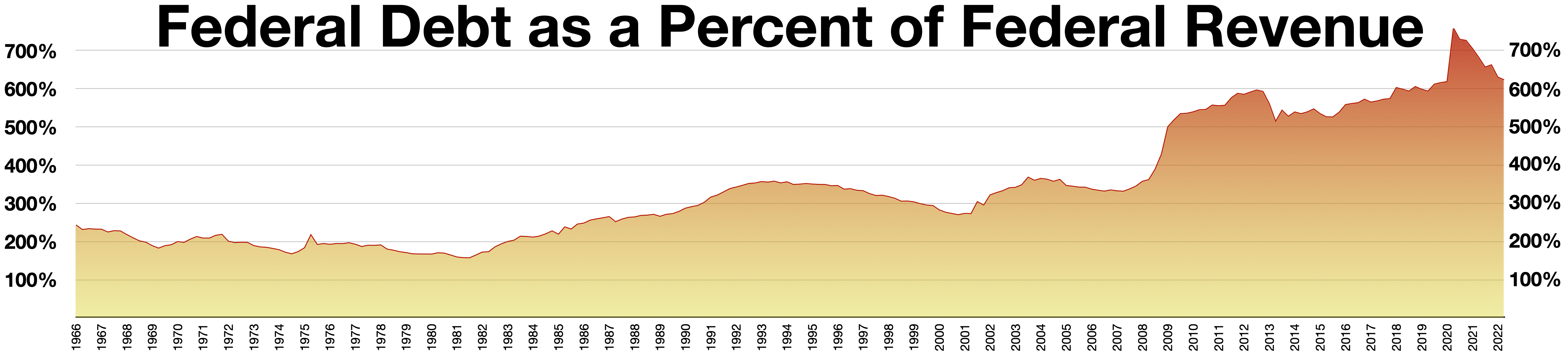
Federal debt to Federal revenue ratio

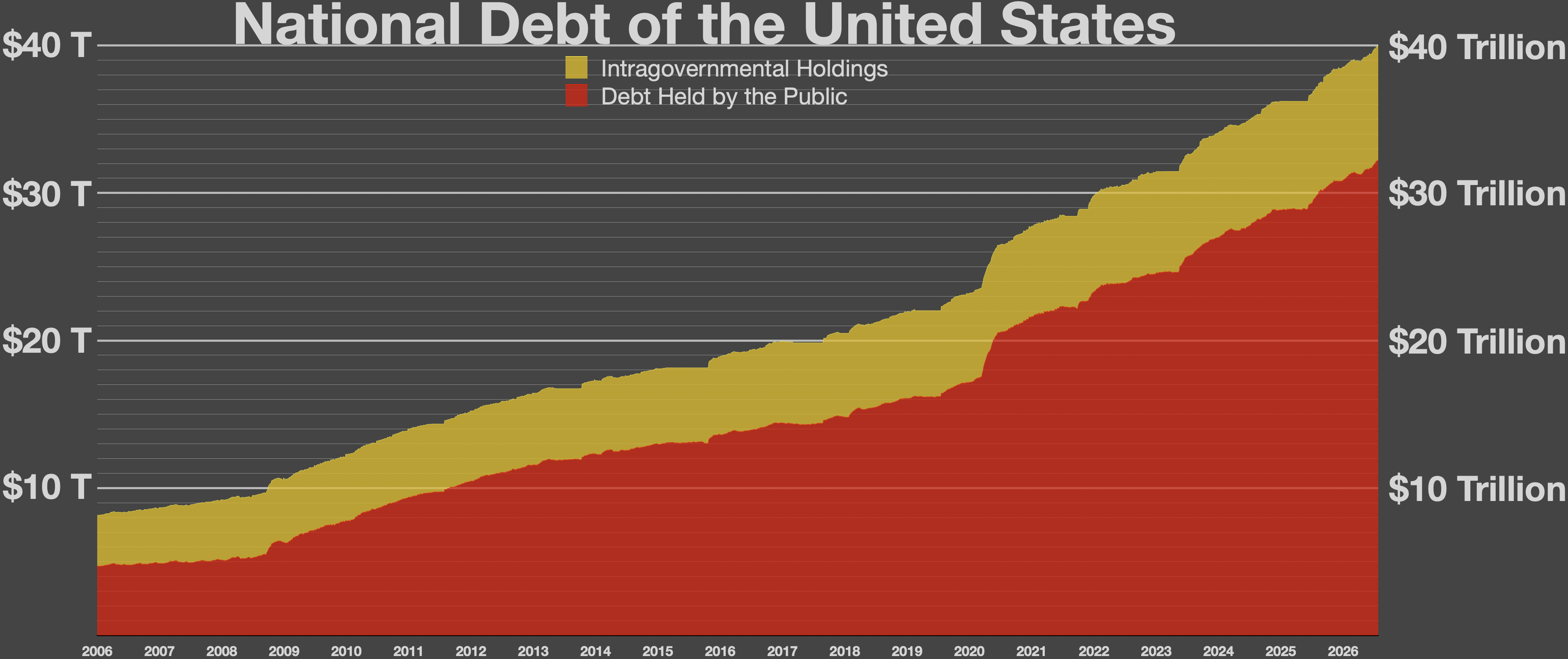
National debt of the United States Intragovernmental holdings Debt held by the public

=== Relationship of deficit and debt ===
Intuitively, the annual budget deficit should represent the amount added to the national debt. However, there are certain types of spending ("supplemental appropriations") outside the budget process which are not captured in the deficit computation, which also add to the national debt. Prior to 2009, spending for the wars in Iraq and Afghanistan was often funded through special appropriations excluded from the budget deficit calculation. In FY2010 and prior, the budget deficit and annual change in the national debt were significantly different. For example, the U.S. added $1 trillion to the national debt in FY2008 but reported a deficit of $455 billion. Due to rules changes implemented under President Obama in 2009, the two figures have moved closer together and were nearly identical in 2013 (a CBO-reported deficit of $680 billion versus change in debt of $672 billion). For FY2014, the difference widened again, with the CBO reporting a deficit of $483 billion compared to a change in total debt outstanding of $1,086 billion.

=== Debt categories ===
The total federal debt is divided into "debt held by the public" and "intra-governmental debt." The debt held by the public refers to U.S. government securities or other obligations held by investors (e.g., bonds, bills, and notes), while Social Security and other federal trust funds are part of the intra-governmental debt. As of September 30, 2012, the total debt was $16.1 trillion, with debt held by the public of $11.3 trillion and intragovernmental debt of $4.8 trillion. Debt held by the public as a percentage of gross domestic product (GDP) rose from 34.7% in 2000 to 40.3% in 2008 and 70.0% in 2012. U.S. GDP was approximately $15 trillion during 2011 and an estimated $15.6 trillion for 2012 based on activity during the first two quarters. This means the total debt is roughly the size of GDP. Economists debate the level of debt relative to GDP that signals a "red line" or dangerous level, or if any such level exists. By comparison, China's budget deficit was 1.6% of its $10 trillion GDP in 2010, with a debt to GDP ratio of 16%.

=== Risks associated with the debt ===
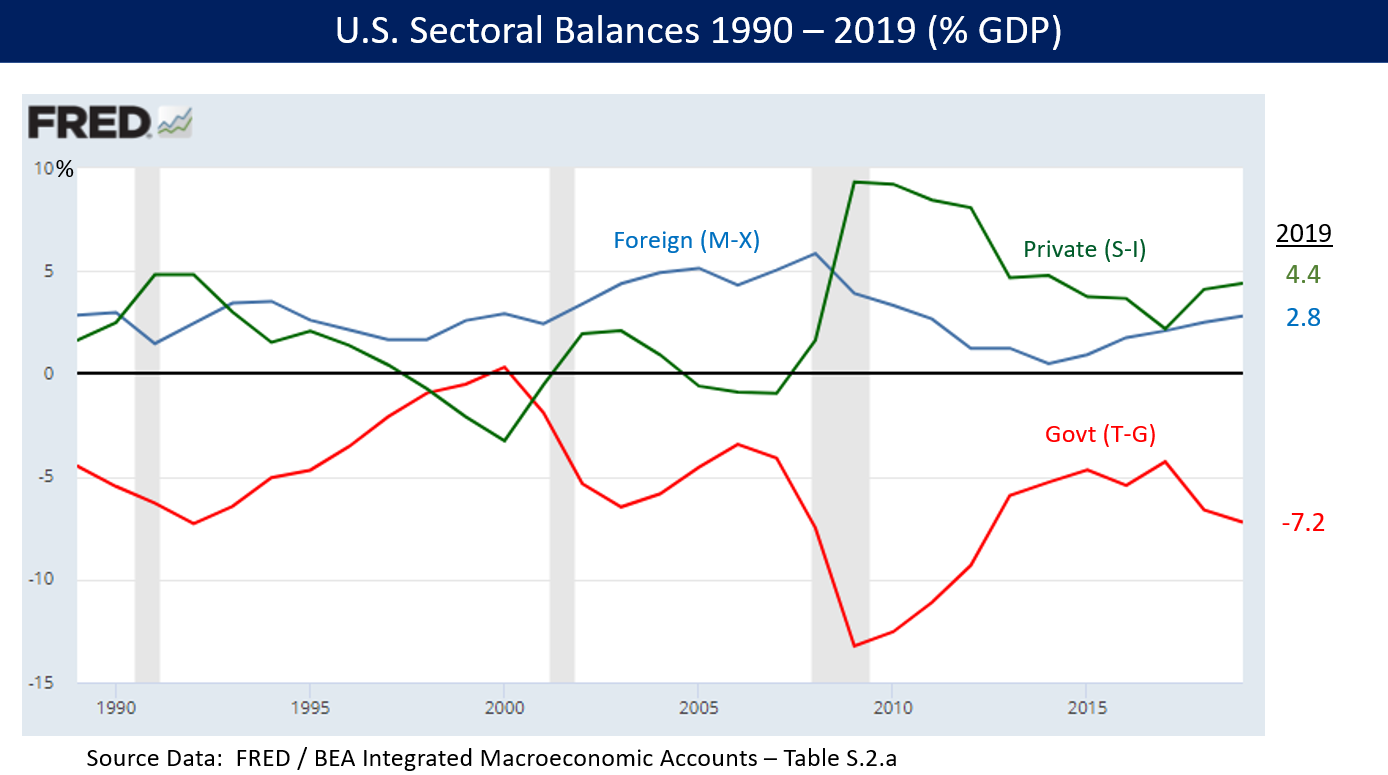
Sectoral financial balances in U.S. economy 1990–2017. By definition, the three balances must net to zero. Since 2009, the U.S. capital surplus (i.e., trade deficit) and private sector surplus (i.e., savings greater than investment) have driven a government budget deficit.

The CBO reported several types of risk factors related to rising debt levels in a July 2010 publication:

- A growing portion of savings would go towards purchases of government debt, rather than investments in productive capital goods such as factories and leading to lower output and incomes than would otherwise occur;
- Rising interest costs would force reductions in important government programs;
- To the extent that additional tax revenues were generated by increasing marginal tax rates, those rates would discourage work and saving, further reducing output and incomes;
- Restrictions to the ability of policymakers to use fiscal policy to respond to economic challenges; and
- An increased risk of a sudden fiscal pressure on the government, in which investors demand higher interest rates.

However, since mid- to late-2010, the U.S. Treasury has been obtaining negative real interest rates at Treasury security auctions. At such low rates, government debt borrowing saves taxpayer money according to one economist. There is no guarantee that such rates will continue, but the trend has remained falling or flat as of October 2012.

Fears of a fiscal crisis triggered by a significant selloff of U.S. Treasury securities by foreign owners such as China and Japan did not materialize, even in the face of significant sales of those securities during 2015, as demand for U.S. securities remained robust.

=== Government budget balance as a sectoral component ===
Economist Martin Wolf explained in July 2012 that government fiscal balance is one of three major financial sectoral balances in the U.S. economy, the others being the foreign financial sector and the private financial sector. The sum of the surpluses or deficits across these three sectors must be zero by definition. Since the foreign and private sectors are in surplus, the government sector must be in deficit.

Wolf argued that the sudden shift in the private sector from deficit to surplus due to the global economic conditions forced the government balance into deficit, writing: "The financial balance of the private sector shifted towards surplus by the almost unbelievable cumulative total of 11.2 percent of gross domestic product between the third quarter of 2007 and the second quarter of 2009, which was when the financial deficit of US government (federal and state) reached its peak...No fiscal policy changes explain the collapse into massive fiscal deficit between 2007 and 2009, because there was none of any importance. The collapse is explained by the massive shift of the private sector from financial deficit into surplus or, in other words, from boom to bust."

Economist Paul Krugman also explained in December 2011 the causes of the sizable shift from private sector deficit to surplus: "This huge move into surplus reflects the end of the housing bubble, a sharp rise in household saving, and a slump in business investment due to lack of customers."

== Contemporary issues and debates ==
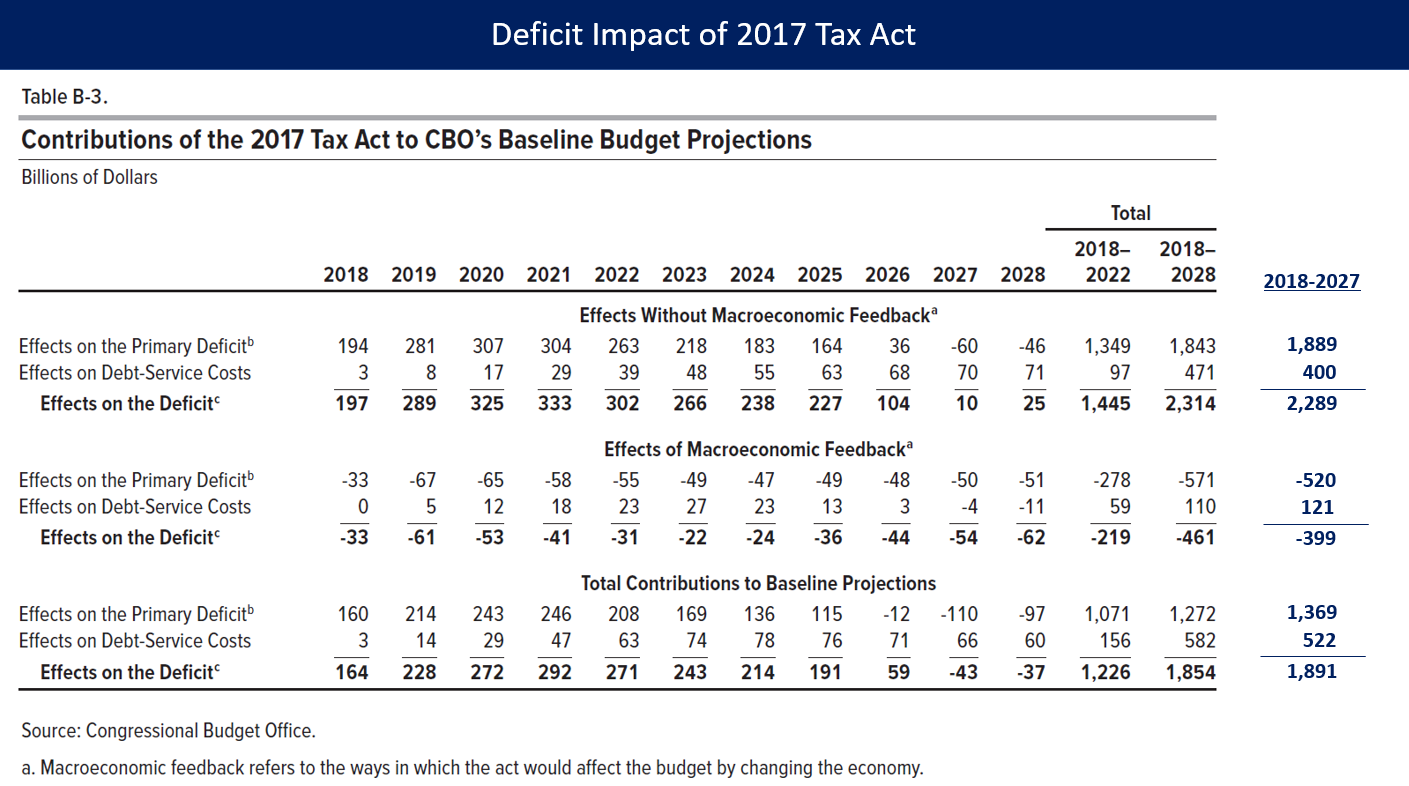
CBO forecasts that the 2017 Tax Act will increase the sum of budget deficits (debt) by $2.289 trillion over the 2018-2027 decade, or $1.891 trillion after macro-economic feedback.

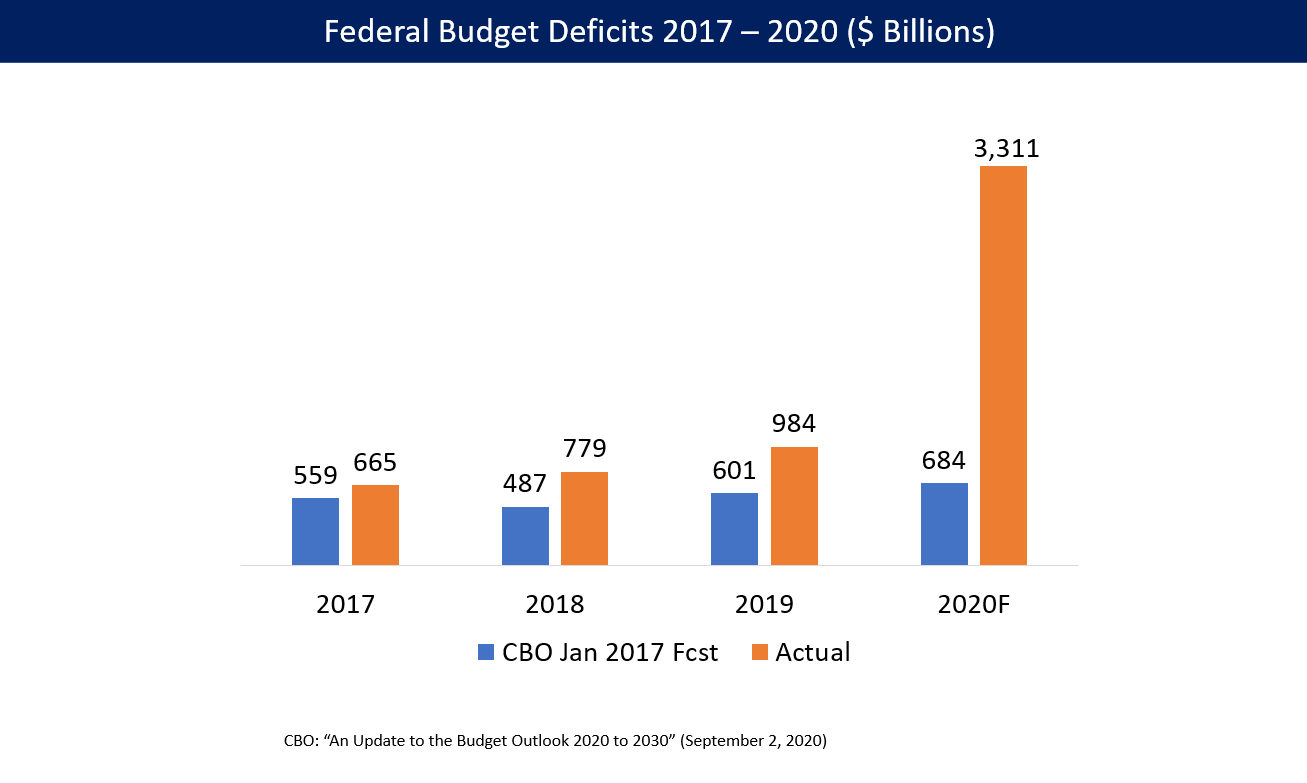
Federal budget deficits from FY2016 through FY2018 estimates. The 2016 and 2017 amounts are actual results. The CBO estimate for 2018 is from their January 2017 baseline, which reflected laws in place when President Trump was inaugurated. The OMB estimate is from President Trump's 2019 budget.

=== Conceptual arguments ===
Many of the debates surrounding the United States federal budget center around competing macroeconomic schools of thought. In general, Democrats favor the principles of Keynesian economics to encourage economic growth via a mixed economy of both private and public enterprise, a welfare state, and strong regulatory oversight. Conversely, Republicans and Libertarians generally support applying the principles of either laissez-faire or supply-side economics to grow the economy via small government, low taxes, limited regulation, and free enterprise. Debates have surrounded the appropriate size and role of the federal government since the founding of the country. These debates also deal with questions of morality, income equality, and intergenerational equity. For example, Congress adding to the debt today may or may not enhance the quality of life for future generations, who must also bear the additional interest and taxation burden.

Political realities make major budgetary deals difficult to achieve. While Republicans argue conceptually for reductions in Medicare and Social Security, they are hesitant to actually vote to reduce the benefits from these popular programs. Democrats on the other hand argue conceptually for tax increases on the wealthy, yet may be hesitant to vote for them because of the effect on campaign donations from the wealthy. The so-called budgetary "grand bargain" of tax hikes on the rich and removal of some popular tax deductions in exchange for reductions to Medicare and Social Security is therefore elusive.

=== Trump tax cuts ===
President Trump signed the Tax Cuts and Jobs Act into law in December 2017. CBO forecasts that the 2017 Tax Act will increase the sum of budget deficits (debt) by $2.289 trillion over the 2018-2027 decade, or $1.891 trillion after macro-economic feedback. This is in addition to the $10.1 trillion increase forecast under the June 2017 policy baseline and existing $20 trillion national debt. The Tax Act will reduce spending for lower income households while cutting taxes for higher income households, as CBO reported on December 21, 2017: "Overall, the combined effect of the change in net federal revenue and spending is to decrease deficits (primarily stemming from reductions in spending) allocated to lower-income tax filing units and to increase deficits (primarily stemming from reductions in taxes) allocated to higher-income tax filing units."

CBO forecast in January 2017 (just prior to Trump's inauguration) that revenues in fiscal year 2018 would be $3.60 trillion if laws in place as of January 2017 continued. However, actual 2018 revenues were $3.33 trillion, a shortfall of $270 billion (7.5%) relative to the forecast. This difference is primarily due to the Tax Act. In other words, revenues would have been considerably higher in the absence of the tax cuts.

The New York Times reported in August 2019 that: "The increasing levels of red ink stem from a steep falloff in federal revenue after Mr. Trump's 2017 tax cuts, which lowered individual and corporate tax rates, resulting in far fewer tax dollars flowing to the Treasury Department. Tax revenues for 2018 and 2019 have fallen more than $430 billion short of what the budget office predicted they would be in June 2017, before the tax law was approved that December."

=== Healthcare reform ===
The CBO has consistently reported since 2010 that the Patient Protection and Affordable Care Act (also known as "Obamacare") would reduce the deficit, as its tax increases and reductions in future Medicare spending offset its incremental spending for subsidies for low-income households. The CBO reported in June 2015 that repeal of the ACA would increase the deficit between $137 billion and $353 billion over the 2016–2025 period in total, depending on the impact of macroeconomic feedback effects. In other words, ACA is a deficit reducer, as its repeal would raise the deficit.

The Medicare Trustees provide an annual report of the program's finances. The forecasts from 2009 and 2015 differ materially, mainly due to changes in the projected rate of healthcare cost increases, which have moderated considerably. Rather than rising to nearly 12% GDP over the forecast period (through 2080) as forecast in 2009, the 2015 forecast has Medicare costs rising to 6% GDP, comparable to the Social Security program.

The increase in healthcare costs is one of the primary drivers of long-term budget deficits. The long-term budget situation has considerably improved in the 2015 forecast versus the 2009 forecast per the Trustees Report.

U.S. healthcare costs were approximately $3.2 trillion or nearly $10,000 per person on average in 2015, the equivalent of roughly $14,000 per person in 2025. Major categories of expense include hospital care (32%), physician and clinical services (20%), and prescription drugs (10%). U.S. costs in 2016 were substantially higher than other OECD countries, at 17.2% GDP versus 12.4% GDP for the next most expensive country (Switzerland). For scale, a 5% GDP difference represents about $1 trillion or $3,000 per person. Some of the many reasons cited for the cost differential with other countries include: Higher administrative costs of a private system with multiple payment processes; higher costs for the same products and services; more expensive volume/mix of services with higher usage of more expensive specialists; aggressive treatment of very sick elderly versus palliative care; less use of government intervention in pricing; and higher income levels driving greater demand for healthcare. Healthcare costs are a fundamental driver of health insurance costs, which leads to coverage affordability challenges for millions of families. There is ongoing debate whether the current law (ACA/Obamacare) and the Republican alternatives (AHCA and BCRA) do enough to address the cost challenge.

=== The Great Recession ===
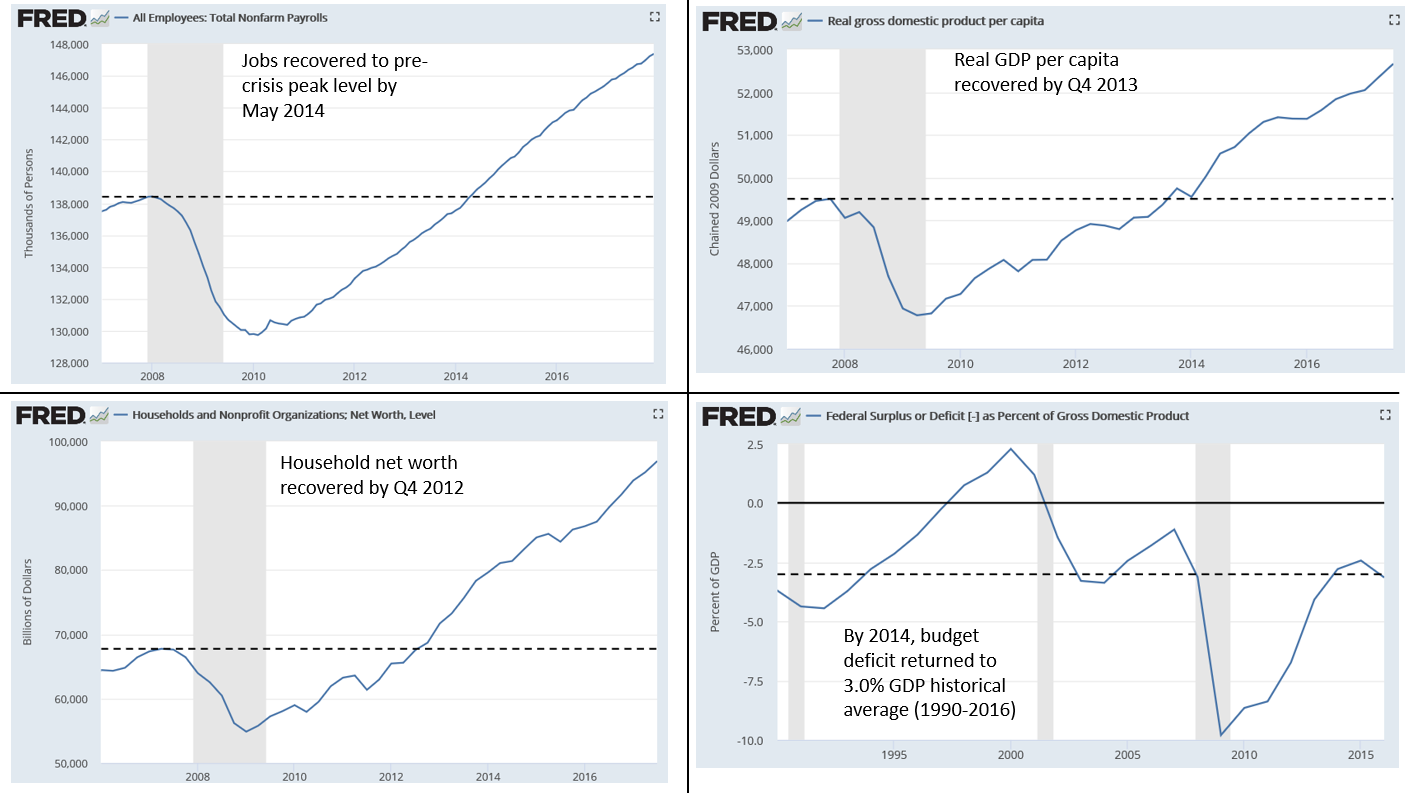
Several major U.S. economic variables had recovered from the 2007-2009 Subprime mortgage crisis and Great Recession by the 2013-2014 time period.

In the wake of the 2007–2009 U.S. recession, there were several important fiscal debates around key questions:

1. What caused the sizable deficit increases during and shortly after the Great Recession? The CBO reported that the deficit expansion was mainly due to the economic downturn rather than policy choices. Revenue fell while social safety net spending increased for programs such as unemployment compensation and food stamps, as more families qualified for benefits. From 2008 to 2009, the large deficit increase was also driven by spending on stimulus and bailout programs.
2. Should the Bush tax cuts of 2001 and 2003 be allowed to expire in 2010 as scheduled? Ultimately, the Bush tax cuts were allowed to expire for the highest income taxpayers only as part of the American Taxpayer Relief Act of 2012.
3. Should significant deficits be continued or should fiscal austerity be implemented? While the deficit jumped from 2008 to 2009, by 2014 it had fallen to its historical average relative to the size of the economy (GDP). This was due to the recovering economy, which had increased tax revenue. In addition, tax increases were implemented on higher-income taxpayers, while military and non-military discretionary spending were reduced or restrained (sequestered) as part of the Budget Control Act of 2011.

=== Impact of Coronavirus and CARES Act of 2020 ===
The COVID-19 pandemic in the United States impacted the economy significantly beginning in March 2020, as businesses were shut-down and furloughed or fired personnel. About 16 million persons filed for unemployment insurance in the three weeks ending April 9. It caused the number of unemployed persons to increase significantly, which is expected to reduce tax revenues while increasing automatic stabilizer spending for unemployment insurance and nutritional support. As a result of the adverse economic impact, both state and federal budget deficits will dramatically increase, even before considering any new legislation.

To help address lost income for millions of workers and assist businesses, Congress and President Trump enacted the Coronavirus Aid, Relief, and Economic Security Act (CARES) on March 18, 2020. It included loans and grants for businesses, along with direct payments to individuals and additional funding for unemployment insurance. Some or all of the loans may ultimately be paid back including interest, while the spending measures should dampen the negative budgetary impact of the economic disruption. While the law will almost certainly increase budget deficits relative to the January 2020 10-year CBO baseline (completed prior to the Coronavirus), in the absence of the legislation, a complete economic collapse could have occurred.

CBO provided a preliminary score for the CARES Act on April 16, 2020, estimating that it would increase federal deficits by about $1.8 trillion over the 2020-2030 period. The estimate includes:

- A $988 billion increase in mandatory outlays;
- A $446 billion decrease in revenues; and
- A $326 billion increase in discretionary outlays, stemming from emergency supplemental appropriations.

CBO reported that not all parts of the bill will increase deficits: “Although the act provides financial assistance totaling more than $2 trillion, the projected cost is less than that because some of that assistance is in the form of loan guarantees, which are not estimated to have a net effect on the budget. In particular, the act authorizes the Secretary of the Treasury to provide up to $454 billion to fund emergency lending facilities established by the Board of Governors of the Federal Reserve System. Because the income and costs stemming from that lending are expected to roughly offset each other, CBO estimates no deficit effect from that provision.”

The Committee for a Responsible Federal Budget estimated that, partially as the result of the CARES Act, the budget deficit for fiscal year 2020 would increase to a record $3.8 trillion, or 18.7% GDP. For scale, in 2009 the budget deficit reached 9.8% GDP ($1.4 trillion nominal dollars) in the depths of the Great Recession. CBO forecast in January 2020 that the budget deficit in FY2020 would be $1.0 trillion, prior to considering the impact of the coronavirus pandemic or CARES.

While the Federal Reserve is also conducting stimulative monetary policy, essentially "printing money" electronically to purchase bonds, its balance sheet is not a component of the national debt.

The CBO forecast in April 2020 that the budget deficit in fiscal year 2020 would be $3.7 trillion (17.9% GDP), versus the January estimate of $1 trillion (4.6% GDP). CBO also forecast the unemployment rate would rise to 16% by Q3 2020 and remain above 10% in both 2020 and 2021.

=== Budget deficits under political parties ===
Economists Alan Blinder and Mark Watson reported that budget deficits tended to be smaller under Democratic presidents, at 2.1% potential GDP versus 2.8% potential GDP for Republican presidents, a difference of about 0.7% GDP. Their study was from President Truman through President Obama's first term, which ended in January 2013.

=== Balance of payments between the states ===
In 2019, residents and businesses in only 8 states contributed, as a whole, more money to the federal treasury than they received in services. Per capita, these were Connecticut ($1,614), Massachusetts ($1,439), New York ($1,172), New Jersey ($1,163), Minnesota ($336), Colorado ($239), California ($168), and Utah ($130). All other states received more in services than taxpayers there contributed, especially in (per capita) Kentucky ($14,153), Virginia ($13,096), and Alaska ($10,144).

== Public opinion polls ==
According to a December 2012 Pew Research Center poll, only a few of the frequently discussed deficit reduction ideas have majority support:

- 69% support raising the tax rate on income over $250,000.
- 54% support limiting deductions taxpayers can claim.
- 52% support raising the tax on investment income.
- 51% support reducing Medicare payments to high-income seniors.
- 51% support reducing Social Security payments to high-income seniors.

Fewer than 50% support raising the retirement age for Social Security or Medicare, reducing military defense spending, limiting the mortgage interest deduction, or reducing federal funding for low income persons, education and infrastructure.

== Budget deficit reduction ==
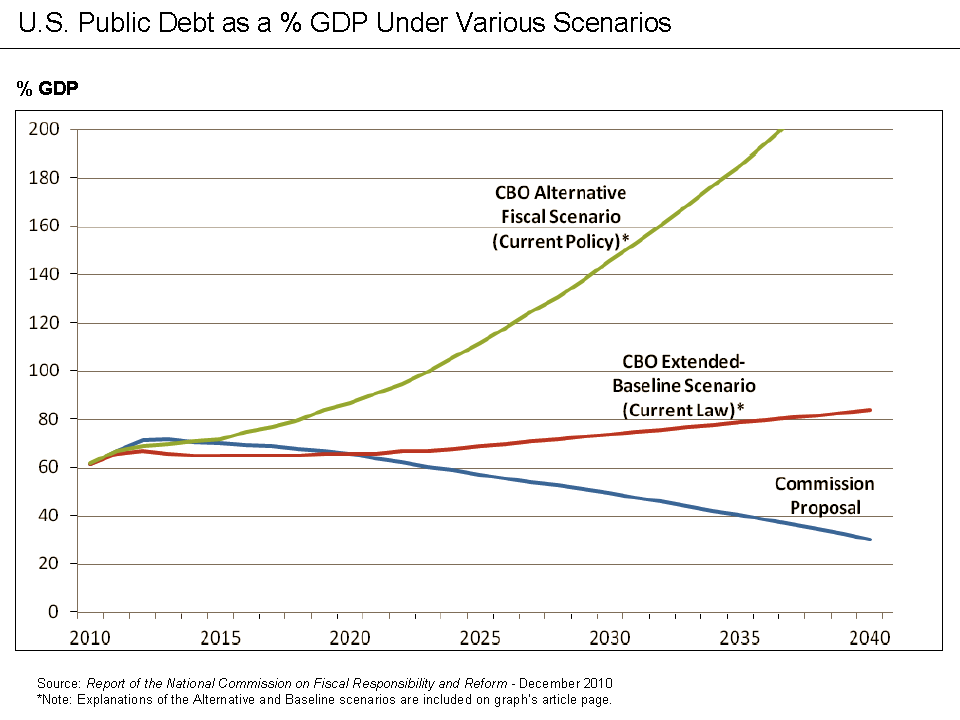
2010 Report of the National Commission on Fiscal Responsibility and Reform-Public Debt as % GDP Under Various Scenarios

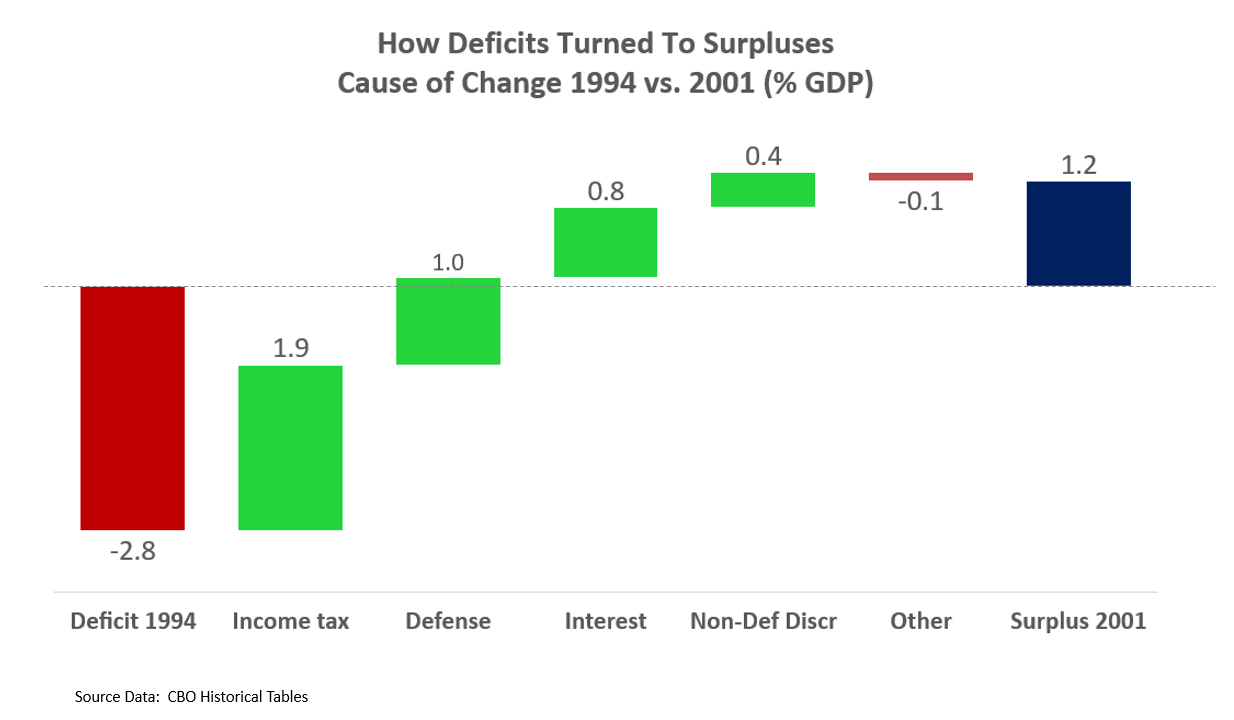
Waterfall chart shows cause of change from deficit in 1994 to surplus in 2001, measured as a % GDP. Income tax revenues rose as a % GDP following higher taxes for high income earners, while defense spending and interest fell relative to GDP.

=== Strategies ===
There are a variety of proposed strategies for reducing the federal deficit. These may include policy choices regarding taxation and spending, along with policies designed to increase economic growth and reduce unemployment. For example, a fast-growing economy offers the win-win outcome of a larger proverbial economic pie, with higher employment and tax revenues, lower safety net spending and a lower debt-to-GDP ratio. However, most other strategies represent a tradeoff scenario in which money or benefits are taken from some and given to others. Spending can be reduced from current levels, frozen, or the rate of future spending increases reduced. Budgetary rules can also be implemented to manage spending. Some changes can take place today, while others can phase in over time. Tax revenues can be raised in a variety of ways, by raising tax rates, the scope of what is taxed, or eliminating deductions and exemptions ("tax expenditures"). Regulatory uncertainty or barriers can be reduced, as these may cause businesses to postpone investment and hiring decisions.

The CBO reported in January 2017 that:

The effects on the federal budget of the aging population and rapidly growing health care costs are already apparent over the 10-year horizon—especially for Social Security and Medicare—and will grow in size beyond the baseline period. Unless laws governing fiscal policy were changed—that is, spending for large benefit programs was reduced, increases in revenues were implemented, or some combination of those approaches was adopted—debt would rise sharply relative to GDP after 2027.

During June 2012, Federal Reserve Chair Ben Bernanke recommended three objectives for fiscal policy: 1) Take steps to put the federal budget on a sustainable fiscal path; 2) Avoid unnecessarily impeding the ongoing economic recovery; and 3) Design tax policies and spending programs to promote a stronger economy.

President Barack Obama in June 2012 stated:

What I've said is, let's make long-term spending cuts; let's initiate long-term reforms; let's reduce our health care spending; let's make sure that we've got a pathway, a glide-path to fiscal responsibility, but at the same time, let's not under-invest in the things that we need to do right now to grow. And that recipe of short-term investments in growth and jobs with a long-term path of fiscal responsibility is the right approach to take for, I think, not only the United States but also for Europe.

=== Specific proposals ===
A variety of government task forces, expert panels, private institutions, politicians, and journalists have made recommendations for reducing the deficit and slowing the growth of debt. Several organizations have compared the future impact of these plans on the deficit, debt, and economy. One helpful way of measuring the impact of the plans is to compare them in terms of revenue and expense as a percentage of GDP over time, in total and by category. This helps illustrate how the different plan authors have prioritized particular elements of the budget.

==== Government commission proposals ====
- President Obama established a budget reform commission, the National Commission on Fiscal Responsibility and Reform, which released a draft report in December 2010. The proposal is sometimes called the "Bowles-Simpson" plan after the co-chairs of the commission. It included various tax and spending adjustments to bring long-run government tax revenue and spending into line at approximately 21% of GDP, with $4 trillion debt avoidance over 10 years. Under 2011 policies, the national debt would increase approximately $10 trillion over the 2012–2021 period, so this $4 trillion avoidance reduces the projected debt increase to $6 trillion. The Center on Budget and Policy Priorities analyzed the plan and compared it to other plans in October 2012.

==== President Obama's proposals ====
- President Obama announced a 10-year (2012–2021) plan in September 2011 called: "Living Within Our Means and Investing in the Future: The President's Plan for Economic Growth and Deficit Reduction." The plan included tax increases on the wealthy, along with cuts in future spending on defense and Medicare. Social Security was excluded from the plan. The plan included a net debt avoidance of $3.2 trillion over 10 years. If the Budget Control Act of 2011 is included, this adds another $1.2 trillion in deficit reduction for a total of $4.4 trillion. The Bipartisan Policy Center (BPC) evaluated the President's 2012 budget against several alternate proposals, reporting it had revenues relative to GDP similar to the Domenici-Rivlin and Bowles-Simpson expert panel recommendations but slightly higher spending.
- President Obama proposed during July 2012 allowing the Bush tax cuts to expire for individual taxpayers earning over $200,000 and couples earning over $250,000, which represents the top 2% of income earners. Reverting to Clinton-era tax rates for these taxpayers would mean increases in the top rates to 36% and 39.6% from 33% and 35%. This would raise approximately $850 billion in revenue over a decade. It would also mean raising the tax rate on investment income, which is highly concentrated among the wealthy, to 20% from 15%.

==== Congressional proposals ====
- The House of Representatives Committee on the Budget, chaired by Rep. Paul Ryan (R), released The Path to Prosperity: Restoring America's Promise and a 2012 budget. The Path focuses on tax reform (lowering income tax rates and reducing tax expenditures or loopholes); spending cuts and controls; and redesign of the Medicare and Medicaid programs. It does not propose significant changes to Social Security. The Bipartisan Policy Center (BPC) evaluated the 2012 Republican budget proposal, noting it had the lowest spending and tax revenue relative to GDP among several alternatives.
- The Congressional Progressive Caucus (CPC) proposed "The People's Budget" in April 2011, which it claimed would balance the budget by 2021 while maintaining debt as a % GDP under 65%. It proposed reversing most of the Bush tax cuts; higher income tax rates on the wealthy and restoring the estate tax, investing in a jobs program, and reducing defense spending. The BPC evaluated the proposal, noting it had both the highest spending and tax revenue relative to GDP among several alternatives. The CPC also proposed a 2014 budget called "Back to Work." It included short-term stimulus, defense spending cuts, and tax increases.
- Congressmen Jim Cooper (D-TN) and Steven LaTourette (R-OH) proposed a budget in the House of Representatives in March 2012. While it did not pass the House, it received bi-partisan support, with 17 votes in favor from each party. According to the BPC: "...the plan would enact tax reform by lowering both the corporate and individual income tax rates and raising revenue by broadening the base. Policies are endorsed that improve the health of the Social Security program, restrain health care cost growth, control annually appropriated spending, and make cuts to other entitlement programs." The plan proposes to raise approximately $1 trillion less revenue over the 2013–2022 decade than the Simpson-Bowles and Domenici-Rivlin plans, while cutting non-defense discretionary spending more deeply and reducing the defense spending cuts mandated in the Budget Control Act of 2011. According to the Center on Budget and Policy Priorities, this plan is ideologically to the Right of either the Simpson-Bowles or Domenici-Rivlin plans.
- In May 2012, House Republicans put forward five separate budget proposals for a vote in the Senate. The Republican proposals included the House-approved proposal by House Budget Chairman Paul Ryan and one that was very close in content to the budget proposal submitted earlier in 2012 by President Barack Obama. The other three proposals each called for greatly reduced government spending. The budget put forward by Senator Mike Lee would halve the government over the next 25 years. Senator Rand Paul's budget included proposed cuts to Medicare, Social Security benefits and the closure of four Cabinet departments. The budget plan from Senator Patrick Toomey aimed to balance the budget within eight years. All five of the proposed plans were rejected in the Senate.

==== Private expert panel proposals ====
- The Peter G. Peterson Foundation solicited proposals from six organizations, which included the American Enterprise Institute, the Bipartisan Policy Center, the Center for American Progress, the Economic Policy Institute, The Heritage Foundation, and the Roosevelt Institute Campus Network. The recommendations of each group were reported in May 2011. A year later, Solutions Initiative II asked five leading think tanks — the American Action Forum, the Bipartisan Policy Center, the Center for American Progress, the Economic Policy Institute, and The Heritage Foundation — to address the near-term fiscal challenges of the "fiscal cliff" while offering updated long-term plans. In 2015, the Peterson Foundation invited the American Action Forum, the American Enterprise Institute, the Bipartisan Policy Center, the Center for American Progress, and the Economic Policy Institute to developed specific, "scorable" policy proposals to set the federal budget on a sustainable, long-term path for prosperity and economic growth.
- The Bipartisan Policy Center (BPC) sponsored a Debt Reduction Task Force, co-chaired by Pete V. Domenici and Alice M. Rivlin. The Domenici-Rivlin panel created a report called "Restoring America's Future", which was published in November 2010. The plan claimed to stabilize the debt to GDP ratio at 60%, with up to $6 trillion in debt avoidance over the 2011–2020 period. Specific plan elements included defense and non-defense spending freezes for 4–5 years, income tax reform, elimination of tax expenditures, and a national sales tax or value-added tax (VAT).
- The Hamilton Project published a guidebook with 15 different proposals from various policy and budget experts in February, 2013. The authors were asked to provide pragmatic, evidenced-based proposals that would both reduce the deficit and bring broader economic benefits. Proposals included a value added tax and reductions to tax expenditures, among others.

=== Timing of solutions ===
There is significant debate regarding the urgency of addressing the short-term and long-term budget challenges. Prior to the 2008-2009 U.S. recession, experts argued for steps to be put in place immediately to address an unsustainable trajectory of federal deficits. For example, Fed Chair Ben Bernanke stated in January 2007: "The longer we wait, the more severe, the more draconian, the more difficult the objectives are going to be. I think the right time to start was about 10 years ago."

However, experts after the 2008-2009 U.S. recession argued that longer-term austerity measures should not interfere with measures to address the short-term economic challenges of high unemployment and slow growth. Ben Bernanke wrote in September 2011: "...the two goals--achieving fiscal sustainability, which is the result of responsible policies set in place for the longer term, and avoiding creation of fiscal headwinds for the recovery--are not incompatible. Acting now to put in place a credible plan for reducing future deficits over the long term, while being attentive to the implications of fiscal choices for the recovery in the near term, can help serve both objectives."

IMF managing director Christine Lagarde wrote in August 2011

For the advanced economies, there is an unmistakable need to restore fiscal sustainability through credible consolidation [deficit reduction] plans. At the same time we know that slamming on the brakes too quickly will hurt the recovery and worsen job prospects. So fiscal adjustment must resolve the conundrum of being neither too fast nor too slow. Shaping a Goldilocks fiscal consolidation is all about timing. What is needed is a dual focus on medium-term consolidation and short-term support for growth and jobs. That may sound contradictory, but the two are mutually reinforcing. Decisions on future consolidation, tackling the issues that will bring sustained fiscal improvement, create space in the near term for policies that support growth and jobs.

== Historic budget submissions ==
Annual U.S. spending 1930–2014 alongside U.S. GDP for comparison

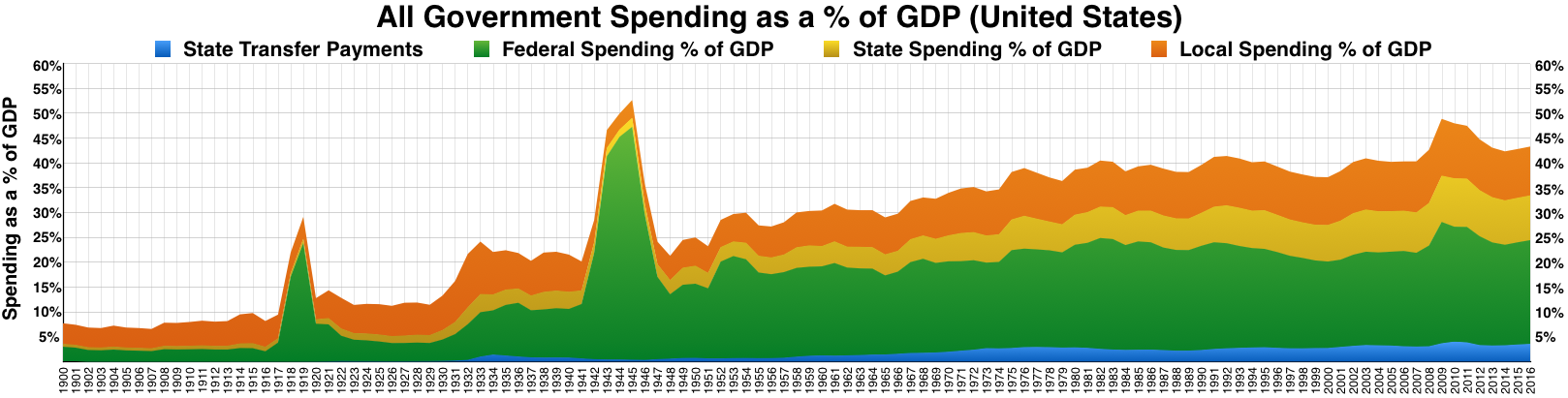
Federal, state, and local spending history

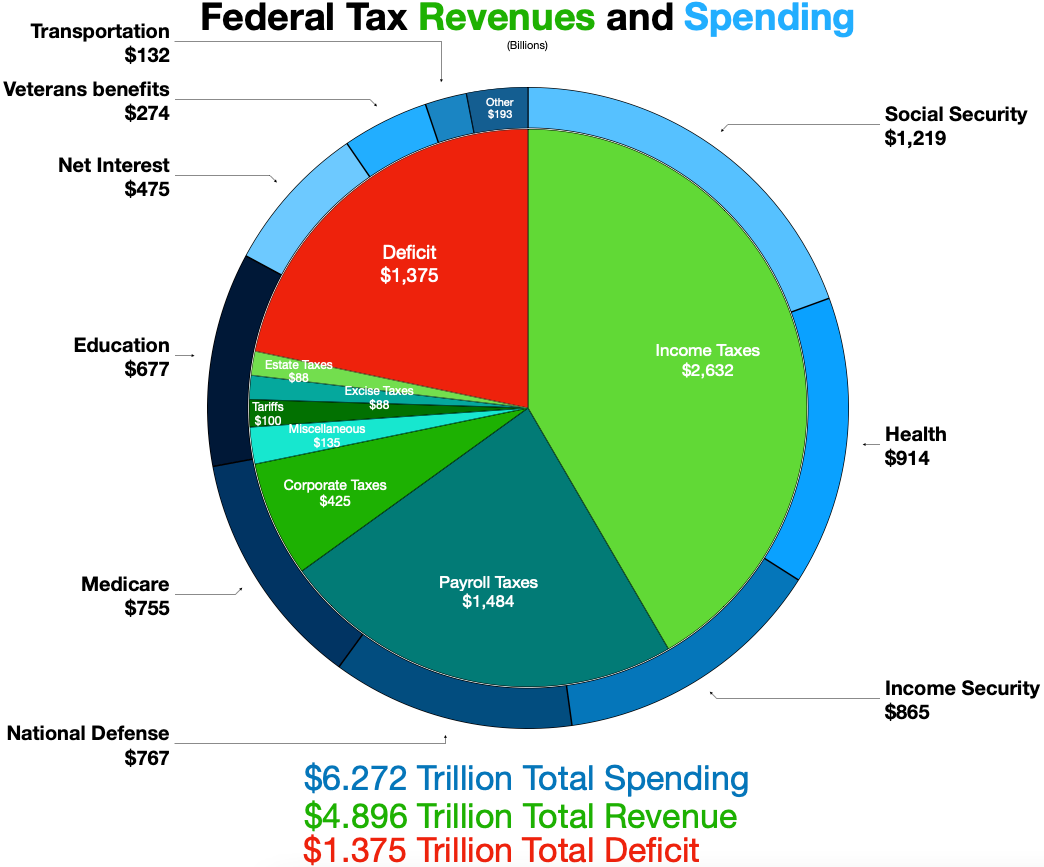
Federal budget 2022

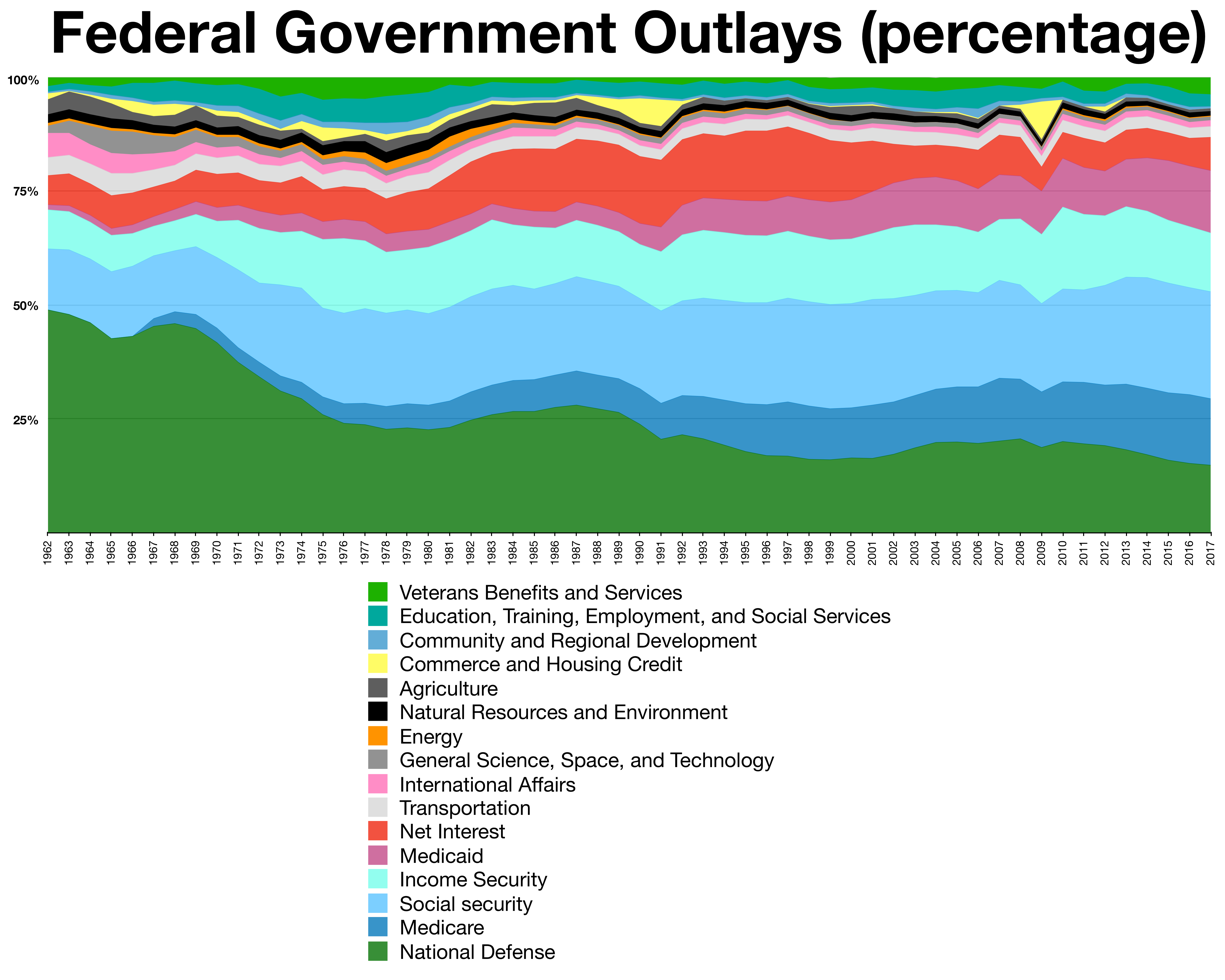
Federal budget outlays by percentage

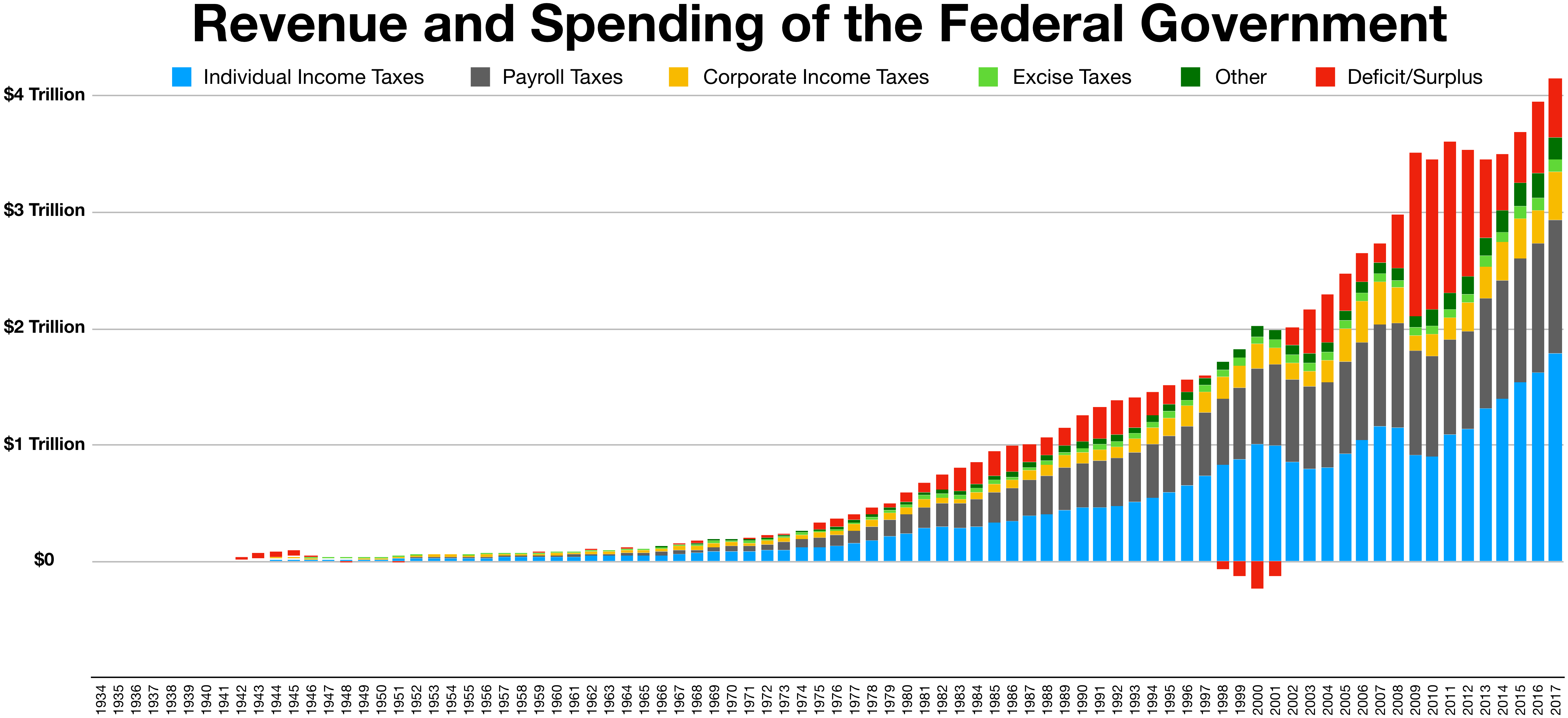
Revenue and Spending of the Federal Government History

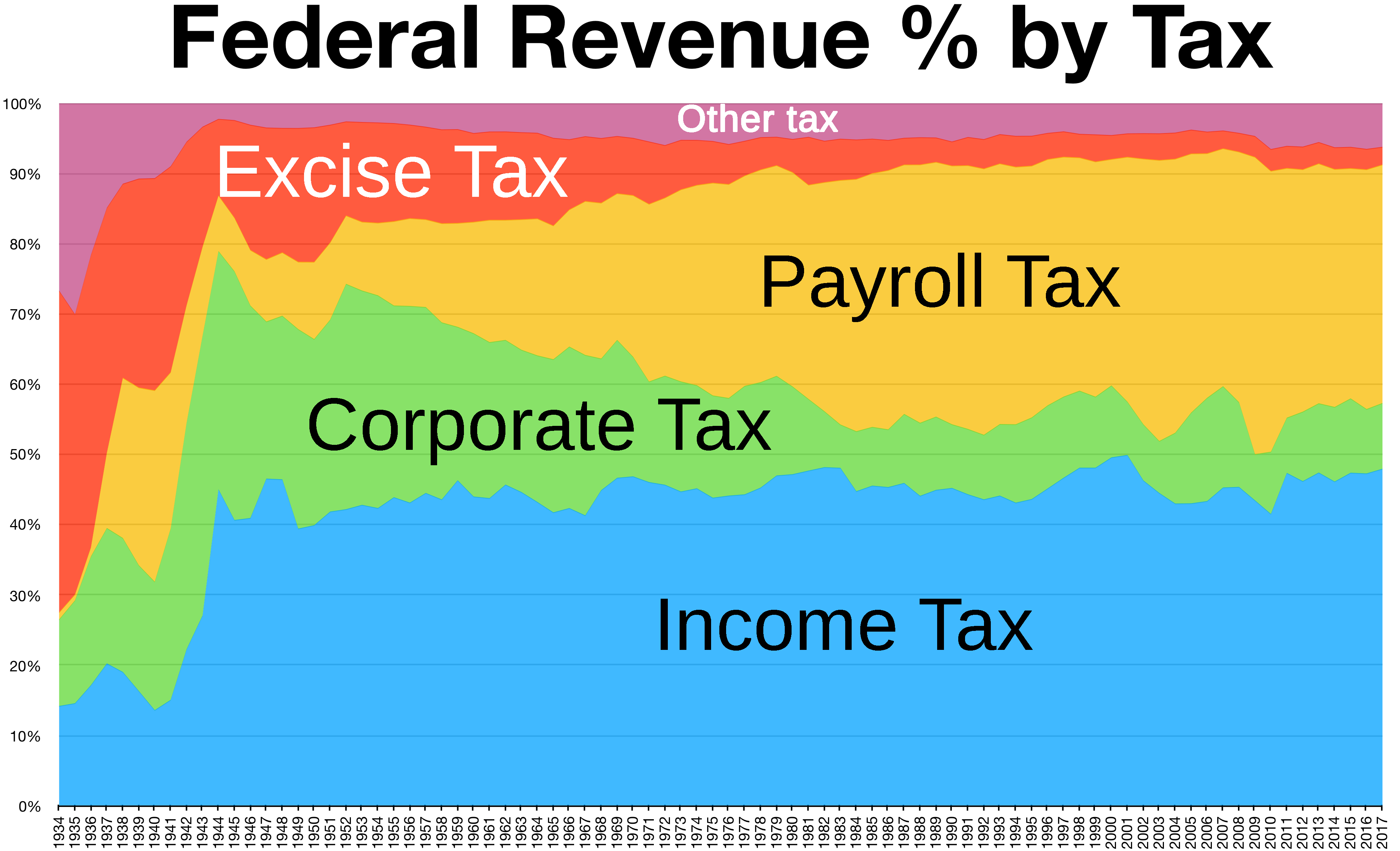
Taxes revenue by source chart history

Federal spending vs revenue

- 2026 United States federal budget – $7.4 trillion (submitted 2025 by President Trump)
- 2025 United States federal budget – $7 trillion (submitted 2024 by President Biden)
- 2024 United States federal budget – $6.8 trillion (submitted 2023 by President Biden)
- 2023 United States federal budget – $6.1 trillion (submitted 2022 by President Biden)
- 2022 United States federal budget – $6.3 trillion (submitted 2021 by President Biden)
- 2021 United States federal budget – $6.8 trillion (submitted 2020 by President Trump)
- 2020 United States federal budget – $6.5 trillion (submitted 2019 by President Trump)
- 2019 United States federal budget – $4.4 trillion (submitted 2018 by President Trump)
- 2018 United States federal budget – $4.1 trillion (submitted 2017 by President Trump)
- 2017 United States federal budget – $4.2 trillion (submitted 2016 by President Obama)
- 2016 United States federal budget – $4 trillion (submitted 2015 by President Obama)
- 2015 United States federal budget – $3.9 trillion (submitted 2014 by President Obama)
- 2014 United States federal budget – $3.5 trillion (submitted 2013 by President Obama)
- 2013 United States federal budget – $3.8 trillion (submitted 2012 by President Obama)
- 2012 United States federal budget – $3.7 trillion (submitted 2011 by President Obama)
- 2011 United States federal budget – $3.8 trillion (submitted 2010 by President Obama)
- 2010 United States federal budget – $3.6 trillion (submitted 2009 by President Obama)
- 2009 United States federal budget – $3.5 trillion (submitted 2008 by President Bush)
- 2008 United States federal budget – $2.9 trillion (submitted 2007 by President Bush)
- 2007 United States federal budget – $2.8 trillion (submitted 2006 by President Bush)
- 2006 United States federal budget – $2.7 trillion (submitted 2005 by President Bush)
- 2005 United States federal budget – $2.4 trillion (submitted 2004 by President Bush)
- 2004 United States federal budget – $2.3 trillion (submitted 2003 by President Bush)
- 2003 United States federal budget – $2.2 trillion (submitted 2002 by President Bush)
- 2002 United States federal budget – $2 trillion (submitted 2001 by President Bush)
- 2001 United States federal budget – $1.9 trillion (submitted 2000 by President Clinton)
- 2000 United States federal budget – $1.8 trillion (submitted 1999 by President Clinton)
- 1999 United States federal budget – $1.7 trillion (submitted 1998 by President Clinton)
- 1998 United States federal budget – $1.7 trillion (submitted 1997 by President Clinton)
- 1997 United States federal budget – $1.6 trillion (submitted 1996 by President Clinton)
- 1996 United States federal budget – $1.6 trillion (submitted 1995 by President Clinton)

The budget year runs from October 1 to September 30 the following year and is submitted by the President to Congress prior to October for the following year. In this way the budget of 2013 is submitted before the end of September 2012. This means that the budget of 2001 was submitted by Bill Clinton and was in force during most of George W. Bush's first year in office. The budget submitted by George W. Bush in his last year in office was the budget of 2009, which was in force through most of Barack Obama's first year in office.

The President's budget also contains revenue and spending projections for the current fiscal year, the coming fiscal years, as well as several future fiscal years. In recent years, the President's budget contained projections five years into the future. The Congressional Budget Office (CBO) issues a "Budget and Economic Outlook" each January and an analysis of the President's budget each March. CBO also issues an updated budget and economic outlook in August.

Actual budget data for prior years is available from the Congressional Budget Office; see the "Historical Budget Data" links on the main page of "The Budget and Economic Outlook". and from the Office of Management and Budget (OMB).

=== Historical development ===
The following table shows the development of annual expenditure and revenue of the United States federal government.

Year	Revenues (million $)	Outlays (million $)	Deficit (million $)	Deficit (in % of GDP)
1789–1849 (total)	1,160	1,090	70	
1850–1900 (total)	14,462	15,453	−991	
1901	588	525	63	
1902	562	485	77	
1903	562	517	45	
1904	541	584	−43	
1905	544	567	−23	
1906	595	570	25	
1907	666	579	87	
1908	602	659	−57	
1909	604	694	−89	
1910	676	694	−18	
1911	702	691	11	
1912	693	690	3	
1913	714	715	−1	
1914	725	726	−1	
1915	683	746	−63	
1916	761	713	48	
1917	1,101	1,954	−853	
1918	3,645	12,677	−9,032	
1919	5,130	18,493	−13,363	
1920	6,649	6,358	291	
1921	5,571	5,062	509	
1922	4,026	3,289	736	
1923	3,853	3,140	713	
1924	3,871	2,908	963	
1925	3,641	2,924	717	
1926	3,795	2,930	865	
1927	4,013	2,857	1,155	
1928	3,900	2,961	939	
1929	3,862	3,127	734	
1930	4,058	3,320	738	0.8%
1931	3,116	3,577	−462	−0.5%
1932	1,924	4,659	−2,735	−4.0%
1933	1,997	4,598	−2,602	−4.5%
1934	2,955	6,541	−3,586	−5.8%
1935	3,609	6,412	−2,803	−4.0%
1936	3,923	8,228	−4,304	−5.4%
1937	5,387	7,580	−2,193	−2.5%
1938	6,751	6,840	−89	−0.1%
1939	6,295	9,141	−2,846	−3.1%
1940	6,548	9,468	−2,920	−3.0%
1941	8,712	13,653	−4,941	−4.3%
1942	14,634	35,137	−20,503	−13.9%
1943	24,001	78,555	−54,554	−29.6%
1944	43,747	91,304	−47,557	−22.2%
1945	45,159	92,712	−47,553	−21.0%
1946	39,296	55,232	−15,936	−7.0%
1947	38,514	34,496	4,018	1.7%
1948	41,560	29,764	11,796	4.5%
1949	39,415	38,835	580	0.2%
1950	39,443	42,562	−3,119	−1.1%
1951	51,616	45,514	6,102	1.9%
1952	66,167	67,686	−1,519	−0.4%
1953	69,608	76,101	−6,493	−1.7%
1954	69,701	70,855	−1,154	−0.3%
1955	65,451	68,444	−2,993	−0.7%
1956	74,587	70,640	3,947	0.9%
1957	79,990	76,578	3,412	0.7%
1958	79,636	82,405	−2,769	−0.6%
1959	79,249	92,098	−12,849	−2.5%
1960	92,492	92,191	301	0.1%
1961	94,388	97,723	−3,335	−0.6%
1962	99,676	106,821	−7,146	−1.2%
1963	106,560	111,316	−4,756	−0.8%
1964	112,613	118,528	−5,915	−0.9%
1965	116,817	118,228	−1,411	−0.2%
1966	130,835	134,532	−3,698	−0.5%
1967	148,822	157,464	−8,643	−1.0%
1968	152,973	178,134	−25,161	−2.8%
1969	186,882	183,640	3,242	0.3%
1970	192,807	195,649	−2,842	−0.3%
1971	187,139	210,172	−23,033	−2.1%
1972	207,309	230,681	−23,373	−1.9%
1973	230,799	245,707	−14,908	−1.1%
1974	263,224	269,359	−6,135	−0.4%
1975	279,090	332,332	−53,242	−3.3%
1976	298,060	371,792	−73,732	−3.1%
1977	355,559	409,218	−53,659	−2.6%
1978	399,561	458,746	−59,185	−2.6%
1979	463,302	504,028	−40,726	−1.6%
1980	517,112	590,941	−73,830	−2.6%
1981	599,272	678,241	−78,968	−2.5%
1982	617,766	745,743	−127,977	−3.9%
1983	600,562	808,364	−207,802	−5.9%
1984	666,438	851,805	−185,367	−4.7%
1985	734,037	946,344	−212,308	−5.0%
1986	769,155	990,382	−221,227	−4.9%
1987	854,287	1,004,017	−149,730	−3.1%
1988	909,238	1,064,416	−155,178	−3.0%
1989	991,104	1,143,743	−152,639	−2.7%
1990	1,031,958	1,252,993	−221,036	−3.7%
1991	1,054,988	1,324,226	−269,238	−4.4%
1992	1,091,208	1,381,529	−290,321	−4.5%
1993	1,154,334	1,409,386	−255,051	−3.8%
1994	1,258,566	1,461,752	−203,186	−2.8%
1995	1,351,790	1,515,742	−163,952	−2.2%
1996	1,453,053	1,560,484	−107,431	−1.3%
1997	1,579,232	1,601,116	−21,884	−0.3%
1998	1,721,728	1,652,458	69,270	0.8%
1999	1,827,452	1,701,842	125,610	1.3%
2000	2,025,191	1,788,950	236,241	2.3%
2001	1,991,082	1,862,846	128,236	1.2%
2002	1,853,136	2,010,894	−157,758	−1.5%
2003	1,782,314	2,159,899	−377,585	−3.3%
2004	1,880,114	2,292,841	−412,727	−3.4%
2005	2,153,611	2,471,957	−318,346	−2.5%
2006	2,406,869	2,655,050	−248,181	−1.8%
2007	2,567,985	2,728,686	−160,701	−1.1%
2008	2,523,991	2,982,544	−458,553	−3.1%
2009	2,104,989	3,517,677	−1,412,688	−9.8%
2010	2,162,706	3,457,079	−1,294,373	−8.7%
2011	2,303,466	3,603,065	−1,299,599	−8.5%
2012	2,449,990	3,536,945	−1,086,955	−6.8%
2013	2,775,106	3,454,648	−679,542	−4.1%
2014	3,021,491	3,506,091	−484,600	−2.8%
2015	3,249,887	3,688,383	−438,496	−2.4%
2016	3,267,961	3,852,612	−584,651	−3.3%
2017	3,316,182	3,981,554	−665,372	−3.7%
2018	3,329,907	4,109,047	−779,140	−3.9%
2019	3,463,364	4,446,960	−983,596	−4.7%
2020	3,421,164	6,553,621	−3,132,457	−14.9%
2021	4,047,111	6,822,470	−2,775,359	−12.0%
2022	4,897,399	6,273,324	−1,375,925	−5.4%
2023	4,440,947	6,134,672	−1,693,725	−6.3%
2024	4,919,000	6,752,000	−1,893,000	−6.4%

== See also ==
- Appropriations bill
- Continuing resolution
- List of countries by government budget
- List of U.S. state budgets
- Modern Monetary Theory
- Starve the beast (policy)
- Unemployment in the United States
- United States fiscal cliff
- National debt of the United States
- International affairs budget of the United States
- United States intelligence budget
