= 1998 United States federal budget =

1998 Budget of the United States federal government
- Submitted: February 6, 1997
- Submitted by: Bill Clinton
- Submitted to: 105th Congress
- Country: United States
- Total revenue: $1.57 trillion (requested) $1.72 trillion (actual); 19.2% of GDP (actual)
- Total expenditures: $1.69 trillion (requested) $1.65 trillion (actual); 18.5% of GDP (actual)
- Surplus: $69.3 billion (actual); 0.8% of GDP (actual)
- Debt: $5.478 trillion (at fiscal end); 61.2% of GDP
- GDP: $8.955 trillion
- Website: Government Publishing Office

The United States Federal Budget for Fiscal Year 1998, was a spending request by President Bill Clinton to fund government operations for October 1997 – September 1998. Figures shown in the spending request do not reflect the actual appropriations for Fiscal Year 1998, which must be authorized by Congress.

== Total Receipts ==
1998 Actual Receipts by Source
1. Individual income tax (48.1%)
2. Social Security/other payroll tax (33.2%)
3. Corporate income tax (11.0%)
4. Excise tax (3.40%)
5. Estate and gift taxes (1.40%)
6. Customs duties (1.00%)
7. Other miscellaneous receipts (1.90%)

(in billions of dollars)

Source	Requested	Actual
Individual income tax	691	829
Corporate income tax	190	189
Social Security and other payroll tax	558	572
Excise tax	61	58
Estate and gift taxes	19	24
Customs duties	18	18
Other miscellaneous receipts	30	33
Total	1,567	1,722

== Total Outlays ==
Outlays by budget function (in millions)

Function	Title	Actual
050	National Defense	$268,194
150	International Affairs	$13,054
250	General Science, Space and Technology	$18,172
270	Energy	$1,270
300	Natural Resources and Environment	$22,278
350	Agriculture	$12,077
370	Commerce and Housing Credit	$1,007
400	Transportation	$40,343
450	Community and Regional Development	$9,771
500	Education, Training, Employment and Social Services	$50,512
550	Health	$131,425
570	Medicare	$192,822
600	Income Security	$237,750
650	Social Security	$379,215
700	Veterans Benefits and Services	$41,741
750	Administration of Justice	$23,359
800	General Government	$15,544
900	Net Interest	$241,118
920	Allowances	$-
950	Undistributed Offsetting Receipts	$−47,194
	Total	$1,652,458
