= Walton v. Commissioner =

- Court: United States Tax Court
- Full case name: Audrey J. Walton v. Commissioner of Internal Revenue
- Decided: December 22, 2000
- Citation: 115 T.C. 589

Court membership
- Judges sitting: Arthur L. Nims, III, Thomas B. Wells, Herbert Chabot, Stephen Swift, Robert Ruwe, Laurence Whalen, John O. Colvin, James Halpern, Carolyn Chiechi, David Laro, Juan F. Vasquez, Joseph H. Gale, L. Paige Marvel

Case opinions
- Majority: Nims, joined by a unanimous court

Laws applied
- Internal Revenue Code

Keywords
- Gift tax; grantor retained annuity trust

Walton v. Commissioner, 115 T.C. 589 (2000), a decision of the United States Tax Court in favor of taxpayer Audrey J. Walton, "ruled that a grantor's right to receive a fixed amount for a term of years, if that right is a qualified interest within the meaning of Section 2702(b), is valued for gift tax purposes under Section 7520, without regard to the life expectancy of the transferor." More simply, a grantor's estate's contingent interest in a grantor-created annuity upon the grantor's death does not constitute a gift to anyone; but rather, is a retained interest of the grantor.

== Facts ==
Audrey J. Walton created two grantor retained annuity trusts (GRATs). Each GRAT had a two-year duration during which Audrey retained the right to receive an annuity. If Audrey died within the two-year period, the annuity payments would be received by her estate. "The balance of the trust property would then be paid to the remainder beneficiaries." Audrey's daughter, Ann Walton Kroenke was the beneficiary of one GRAT, and her other daughter, Nancy Walton Laurie, was the beneficiary of the other.

The GRATs did not return the full annuity payments expected by Audrey (because Wal-Mart stock had underperformed expectations), so no property remained for the daughters (the remainder beneficiaries). Audrey filed a gift-tax return (Form 709) valuing the GRATs as gifts of $0. The IRS "issued a notice of deficiency," asserting that the taxable value of each gift was $3.8 million. Audrey admitted that a mistake was made, but claimed that each gift was worth only $6k.

== Issues ==
- How should the value of the gift effected upon the creation of a GRAT be calculated?
- Did Audrey accurately value her gifts, or did she miscalculate the value of each one by close to $4 million?

== Holding ==
In calculating gift tax for the creation of a GRAT, the grantor's estate's contingent interest in the annuity payments upon the grantor's death should be considered a retained interest of the grantor, not as a gift to someone. The court sided with Audrey, but declined to make specific gift-tax calculations because timing disagreements remained that could best be dealt with through Rule 155 proceedings.

== Reasoning ==
First the court noted that IRC § 2702 provides a formula for gift valuation: "(Value of property transferred) - (value of any qualified interest retained by the grantor) = value of gift." Then court reasoned that "[i]t is axiomatic that an individual cannot make a gift to himself or to his or her own estate." Consequently, "by default [Audrey] retained all interests in the 2-year term annuities set forth in the trust documents," even though the annuity payments would belong to her estate in the event she died within the two-year period.

== Impact ==
This case has led to the proliferation of "Walton GRATs," which tax experts Beth D. Tractenberg & Michael J. Parets describe as GRATs that last "for a term of years, with the annuity payable to the grantor's estate if the grantor dies during the annuity term." This allows the grantor to retain a qualified interest that is equal to the property transferred, resulting in a gift valuation of zero to the remainder-interest party[ies]. The hope is that there will be an upswing in the market, allowing the remainder-interest party[ies] to take home excess returns (above the annuity returns to the grantor) without the imposition of a gift tax.

== See also ==
- Gift tax in the United States
- Grantor Retained Annuity Trust
