= 1992 United States federal budget =

- Submitted to: 102nd Congress
- Country: United States
- Total revenue: $1.1 trillion (actual); 17.0% of GDP
- Total expenditures: $1.4 trillion (actual); 21.5% of GDP
- Deficit: $290.3 billion (actual); 4.5% of GDP
- GDP: $6.4 trillion

The United States federal budget for fiscal year 1992 ran from October 1, 1991, to September 30, 1992.

== Revenue ==
Receipts by source: (in billions of dollars)

Source	Actual
Individual income tax	$476.0
Corporate income tax	$100.3
Social Security and other payroll tax	$413.7
Excise tax	$45.6
Estate and gift taxes	$11.1
Customs duties	$17.4
Other miscellaneous receipts	$27.2
Total	$1,091.2

Receipts by Source – Actual
1. Individual income tax (43.6%)
2. Social Security/other payroll tax (37.9%)
3. Corporate income tax (9.20%)
4. Excise tax (4.20%)
5. Estate and gift taxes (1.00%)
6. Customs duties (1.60%)
7. Miscellaneous receipts (2.50%)

== Outlays ==
The total outlays for fiscal year 1992 was 1.4 trillion dollars.
The budget deficit was $290.3 billion, 4.5% of GDP
