= 2004 United States federal budget =

2004 Budget of the United States federal government
- Submitted: February 3, 2003
- Submitted by: George W. Bush
- Submitted to: 108th Congress
- Country: United States
- Total revenue: $1.92 trillion (requested) $1.88 trillion (actual); 15.6% of GDP (actual)
- Total expenditures: $2.23 trillion (requested) $2.292 trillion (actual); 19.0% of GDP (actual)
- Deficit: $307 billion (requested) $412 billion (actual); 3.4% of GDP (actual)
- Debt: $7.35 trillion (at fiscal end); 60.8% of GDP
- GDP: $12.089 trillion
- Website: Government Publishing Office

The 2004 United States Federal Budget began as a proposal by President George W. Bush to fund government operations for October 1, 2003 – September 30, 2004. The requested budget was submitted to the 108th Congress on February 3, 2003.

== Total Receipts ==
2004 Actual Receipts by Source
1. Individual income tax (43.0%)
2. Social Security/other payroll tax (39.0%)
3. Corporate income tax (10.1%)
4. Excise tax (3.70%)
5. Estate and gift taxes (1.30%)
6. Customs duties (1.10%)
7. Other miscellaneous receipts (1.80%)

Receipts by source: (in billions of dollars)

| Source | Requested | Actual |
|---|---|---|
| Individual income tax | 850 | 809 |
| Corporate income tax | 169 | 189 |
| Social Security and other payroll tax | 765 | 733 |
| Excise tax | 71 | 70 |
| Estate and gift taxes | 23 | 25 |
| Customs duties | 21 | 21 |
| Other miscellaneous receipts | 24 | 33 |
| Total | 1,922 | 1,880 |

== Total Outlays ==
Outlays by budget function (in millions)

| Function | Title | Actual |
|---|---|---|
| 050 | National Defense | $455,813 |
| 150 | International Affairs | $26,870 |
| 250 | General Science, Space and Technology | $23,029 |
| 270 | Energy | $−147 |
| 300 | Natural Resources and Environment | $30,694 |
| 350 | Agriculture | $15,439 |
| 370 | Commerce and Housing Credit | $5,265 |
| 400 | Transportation | $64,627 |
| 450 | Community and Regional Development | $15,820 |
| 500 | Education, Training, Employment and Social Services | $87,974 |
| 550 | Health | $240,122 |
| 570 | Medicare | $269,360 |
| 600 | Income Security | $333,059 |
| 650 | Social Security | $495,548 |
| 700 | Veterans Benefits and Services | $59,746 |
| 750 | Administration of Justice | $45,576 |
| 800 | General Government | $22,338 |
| 900 | Net Interest | $160,245 |
| 920 | Allowances | $ - |
| 950 | Undistributed Offsetting Receipts | $−58,537 |
| | Total | $2,292,841 |
