= 1996 United States federal budget =

1996 Budget of the United States federal government
- Submitted: February 6, 1995
- Submitted by: Bill Clinton
- Submitted to: 104th Congress
- Passed: October 3, 1995, through April 26, 1996
- Country: United States
- Total revenue: $1.42 trillion (requested) $1.45 trillion (actual); 18.2% of GDP (actual)
- Total expenditures: $1.61 trillion (requested) $1.56 trillion (actual); 19.6% of GDP (actual)
- Deficit: $107.4 billion (actual); 1.3% of GDP (actual)
- Debt: $5.181 trillion (at fiscal end); 64.9% of GDP
- GDP: $7.978 trillion
- Website: Office of Management and Budget

The 1996 United States federal budget is the United States federal budget to fund government operations for the fiscal year 1996, which was October 1995 – September 1996. This budget was the first to be submitted after the Republican Revolution in the 1994 midterm elections. Disagreements between Democratic President Bill Clinton and Republicans led by Speaker of the House Newt Gingrich resulted in the United States federal government shutdown of 1995 and 1996.

== Budget proposals ==
In response to Republican victories in the 1994 Congressional elections, President Bill Clinton's initial budget request for FY1996 contained reductions in spending but sought to avoid large cuts to programs such as Medicare and Medicaid.

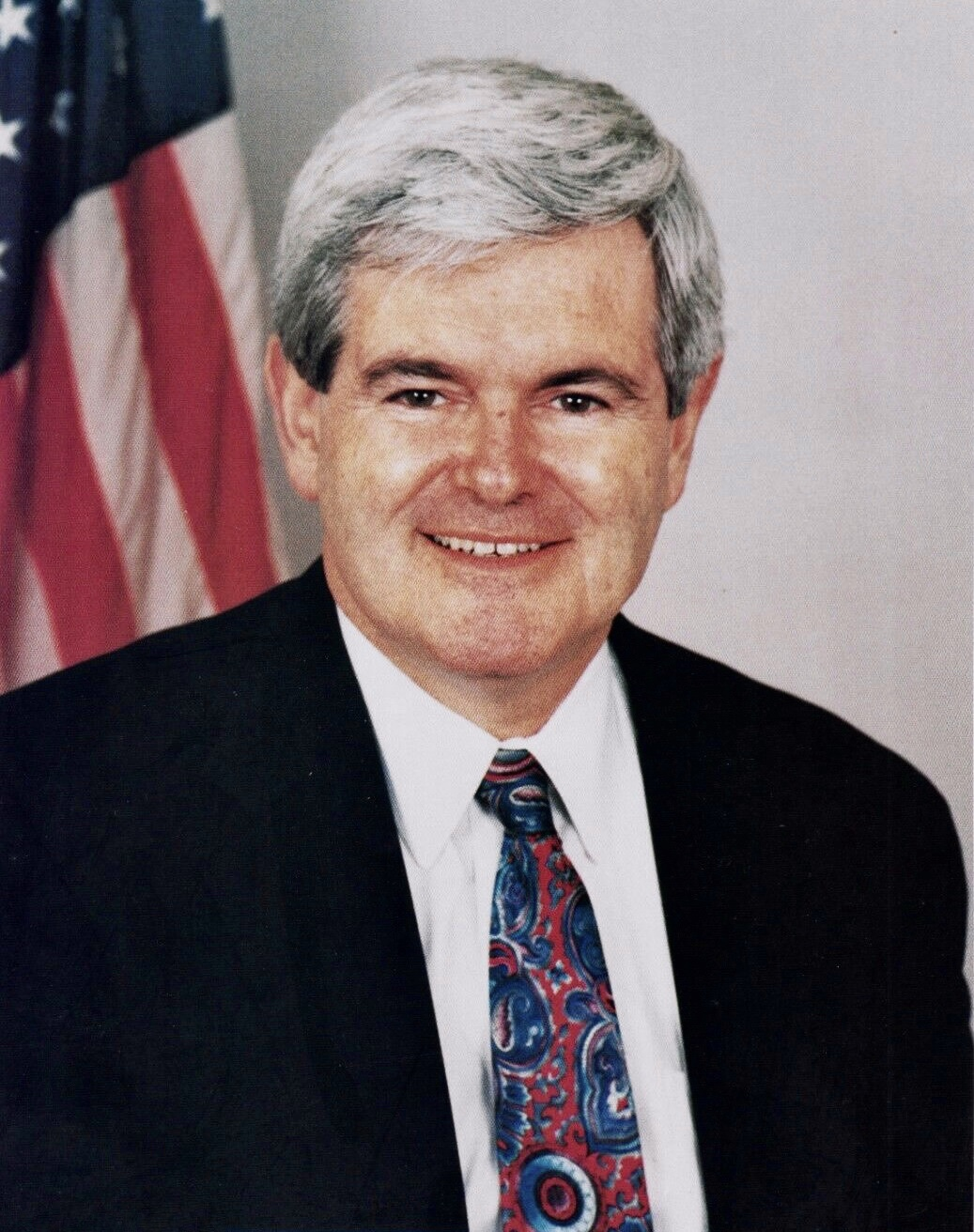
Republicans led by Speaker of the House Newt Gingrich insisted that a plan to eliminate the budget deficit by 2002 be enacted as part of any budget deal. Disagreements on this plan contributed to the government shutdowns of 1995 and 1996.

The requested budget was submitted by President Clinton on February 6, 1995, just five weeks after the beginning of the 104th United States Congress, which was dominated by Republicans who had been victorious in the November 1994 midterm election. Clinton's requested budget provided a middle-class tax cut, including new deductions for children and college expenses, which was offset by a twice-as-large reduction in spending elsewhere in the budget, echoing Speaker Gingrich's goal to eliminate programs that had outlived their usefulness. However, Republicans had demanded a budget that would lead to a balanced budget in 2002, but Clinton's budget projected annual deficits of around $190 billion up to 2005. Clinton's plan also proposed to abolish the Interstate Commerce Commission, and reorganize the Departments of Energy, Transportation, and Housing and Urban Development by consolidating programs into fewer, larger ones, as well as the Office of Personnel Management and the General Services Administration by cutting their staff by a third and a half, respectively.

== Legislation ==
By September 21, 1995, none of the 13 appropriations bills had been signed into law and a continuing resolution was adopted to keep the government running for six more weeks. President Clinton had threatened to veto six of the appropriations bills in preparation due to his opposition to the extent of spending cuts, changes to Medicare and Medicaid, and language on social issues such as abortion. By late October, only three of the bills had been passed. Republican draft legislation at the time contained curbs on entitlement spending and a $245 billion tax cut. Democratic proposals included no tax cut and cut entitlement spending less.

=== Government shutdowns ===
The failure of Congress and the President to enact the remaining appropriations legislation led to government shutdowns during November 13–19, 1995 and December 15, 1995, through January 6, 1996. The shutdowns were triggered by the expiration of continuing resolutions. The first shutdown caused the furlough of about 800,000 federal employees, while the second affected 284,000 due to additional appropriations bills enacted in the interim.

The first shutdown came after Clinton vetoed a continuing resolution and a debt limit extension bill due to riders that Republicans had included in the bills which would have raised Medicare premiums. Leon Panetta, at that time the White House chief of staff, said that "this is the Republicans against the American people," while Speaker Gingrich insisted that he was open to renegotiation if Clinton accepted the Republican seven-year deficit elimination plan, saying "everything would clearly be on the table at that point, as long as he agreed to seven years of an honest balanced budget that was real." The first shutdown ended after Clinton agreed to the seven-year budget plan due to public surliness about the shutdown, and the prospect that a continuing resolution might be passed over his veto.

By December 1, 1995, disagreements continued on the Republican plan to eliminate the deficit in seven years. The Clinton administration said that "The Republican budget plan fails to protect Medicare, Medicaid, education, the environment and tax fairness, and therefore, President Clinton will veto it." There was also a disagreement on the Defense appropriations bill regarding funding for the peacekeeping mission in Bosnia. By December 3, 1995, seven of the thirteen appropriations bills had been passed, including the Defense bill, but further negotiations were seen as having reached an impasse, and lawmakers were considering the implications of a second shutdown. Republicans favored reductions in Medicare, Medicaid and farm programs, which had been historically favored by Democrats, as well as a $245 billion tax cut. Democrats considered the funding of these social programs to be essential, and opposed the size of the tax cut saying it would mainly benefit the wealthy.

The second shutdown began after the most recent continuing resolution had expired. The affected agencies included the Departments of State and the Interior. President Clinton however ordered the National Christmas Tree to remain lit and said he would pay the lighting bill out of his own pocket. The shutdown ended after Clinton complied with Republican demands to submit a seven-year balanced budget plan. Clinton's budget cut less from Medicare and Medicaid than the Republican plan and contained a smaller tax cut. Senate Majority Whip Trent Lott said, "Now, we feel like Charlie Brown, and Lucy has got the football, and every time you think you're going to get a real budget it's jerked away from you," but characterized the President's plan as a positive development despite the differences remaining between the parties. An additional appropriations bill was signed at the same time.

=== Later developments ===
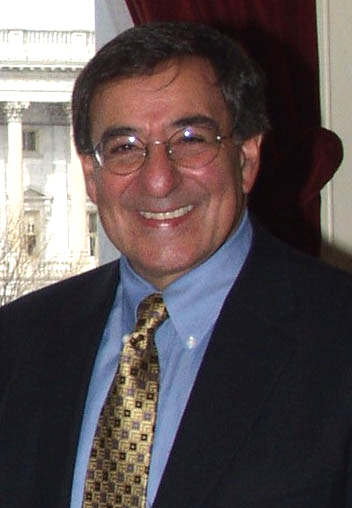
White House Chief of Staff Leon Panetta characterized the budget dispute as "the Republicans against the American people," and accused Republicans of advocating a return to a "survival of the fittest" economy.

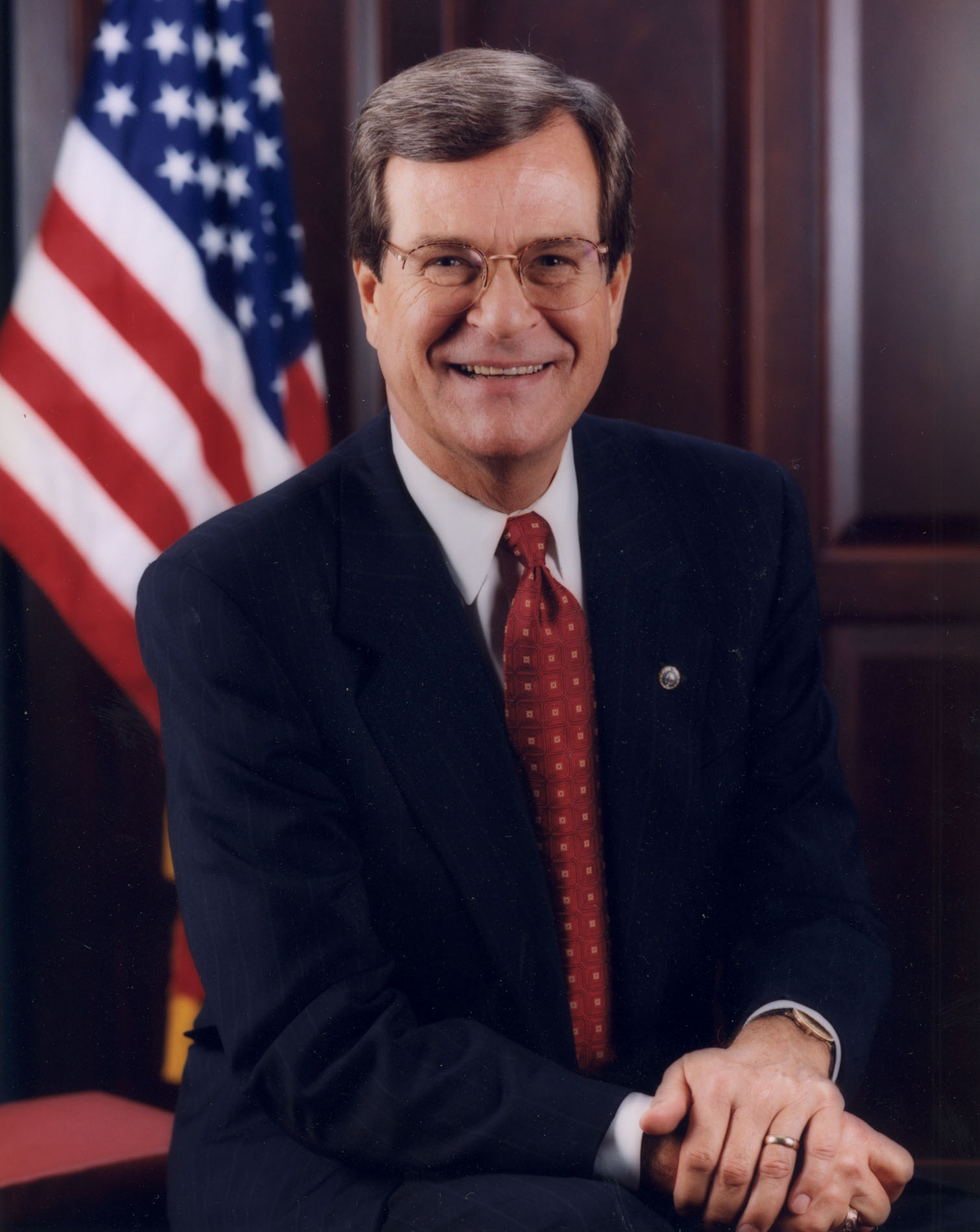
Senate Majority Whip Trent Lott compared the budget negotiations to Charlie Brown attempting to kick a football and having it repeatedly jerked away from him at the last second, referring to a long-running gag in the Peanuts comic strip.

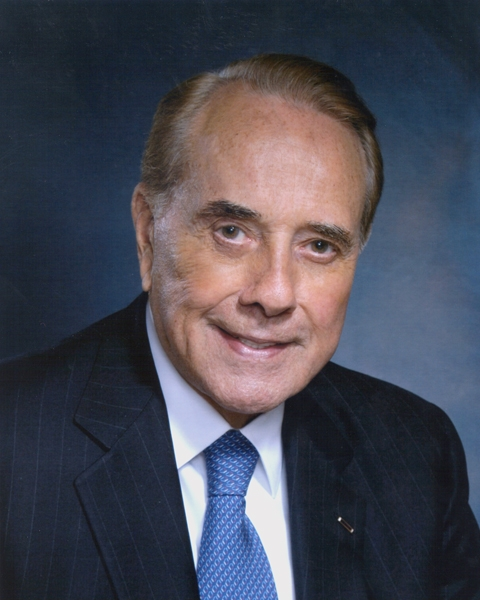
Senate Majority Leader and prospective presidential candidate Bob Dole blamed Clinton for the budget impasse and said, "while the President's words speak of change, his deeds are a contradiction."

Clinton featured the ongoing budget negotiations prominently in his 1996 State of the Union Address on January 23, 1996. Clinton famously stated that "the era of big government is over. But we cannot go back to the time when our citizens were left to fend for themselves." He expressed his willingness to negotiate and enact provisions that were common to both plans, and called on Republicans to abandon the threat of further government shutdowns or a default on the government's debt. Senator Dole's Republican response however placed the blame for the impasse on Clinton, and he stated "While the President's words speak of change, his deeds are a contradiction. President Clinton claims to embrace the future while clinging to the policies of the past."

By March 6, 1996, eight of the 13 appropriations bills had been passed. The remaining bills covered the Departments of Health and Human Services, Veterans Affairs, Justice, State, Commerce, and the Environmental Protection Agency. At the time, the Republicans were offering to increase spending on social programs in return for cuts to Medicare and Medicaid. The change in tactics was due to polls showing the public holding Republicans rather than the President responsible for the government shutdown, and the fact that further government shutdowns might hurt the potential presidential campaign of Senate Majority Leader Bob Dole.

Republicans continually attempted to use a needed increase in the federal debt ceiling as a bargaining chip in the budget negotiations. The battle over the debt limit caused Moody's to threaten to downgrade its credit rating. The debt ceiling was raised on March 29, 1996, in a bill which also enacted a presidential line-item veto.

The last of the budget legislation, an omnibus appropriations bill combining the remaining bills, was passed on April 26, 1996, containing $23 billion in spending cuts.

== Total revenue and spending ==
=== Receipts ===
1996 Actual Receipts by Source
1. Individual income tax (45.1%)
2. Social Security/other payroll tax (35.0%)
3. Corporate income tax (11.8%)
4. Excise tax (3.70%)
5. Customs duties (1.30%)
6. Estate and gift taxes (1.20%)
7. Other miscellaneous receipts (1.80%)

Receipts by source: (in billions of dollars)

Source	Requested	Actual
Individual income tax	623	656
Corporate income tax	157	172
Social Security and other payroll tax	509	509
Excise tax	57	54
Estate and gift taxes	17	17
Customs duties	22	19
Other miscellaneous receipts	29	26
Total	1,415	1,453

=== Outlays ===
The February 1995 budget request contained $1.6121 trillion in outlays, of which $549.0 billion were discretionary and $1,063.2 billion were mandatory.

The enacted budget contained $1.5603 trillion in outlays, of which $534.4 billion were discretionary and $1,026.0 billion were mandatory.

Outlays by budget function: (in millions)

Function	Title	Actual
050	National Defense	$265,748
150	International Affairs	$13,487
250	General Science, Space and Technology	$16,684
270	Energy	$2,839
300	Natural Resources and Environment	$21,503
350	Agriculture	$9,035
370	Commerce and Housing Credit	$−10,478
400	Transportation	$39,565
450	Community and Regional Development	$10,741
500	Education, Training, Employment and Social Services	$48,311
550	Health	$119,365
570	Medicare	$174,225
600	Income Security	$229,746
650	Social Security	$349,671
700	Veterans Benefits and Services	$36,956
750	Administration of Justice	$17,898
800	General Government	$11,755
900	Net Interest	$241,053
920	Allowances	$-
950	Undistributed Offsetting Receipts	$−37,620
	Total	$1,560,484

=== Deficit/Surplus ===
The proposed budget contained an estimated deficit of $196.7 billion and the estimated deficit for enacted legislation was $107.3 billion.
The actual deficit for the fiscal year was $107.4 billion (1.3% of GDP).
