= 1999 United States federal budget =

1999 Budget of the United States federal government
- Submitted: February 2, 1998
- Submitted by: Bill Clinton
- Submitted to: 105th Congress
- Country: United States of America
- Total revenue: $1.74 trillion (requested) $1.83 trillion (actual); 19.2% of GDP (actual)
- Total expenditures: $1.73 trillion (requested) $1.7 trillion (actual); 17.9% of GDP (actual)
- Surplus: $126 billion (actual); 1.3% of GDP (actual)
- Debt: $5.606 trillion (at fiscal end); 58.9% of GDP
- GDP: $9.51 trillion
- Website: Office of Management and Budget

The United States Federal Budget for Fiscal Year 1999 (FY99) was a spending request by President Bill Clinton to fund government operations for October 1998–September 1999. It was the first balanced Federal budget in 30 years. In FY99, revenues were 1.82 trillion dollars. Spending was 1.70 trillion dollars, the surplus was $124 billion, and the GDP was 9.2 trillion.

== Total Receipts ==
1999 Actual Receipts by Source
1. Individual income tax (48.1%)
2. Social Security/other payroll tax (33.5%)
3. Corporate income tax (10.1%)
4. Excise tax (3.80%)
5. Estate and gift taxes (1.50%)
6. Customs duties (1.00%)
7. Other miscellaneous receipts (1.90%)

(in billions of dollars)

Source	Requested	Actual
Individual income tax	791	879
Corporate income tax	198	185
Social Security and other payroll tax	596	612
Excise tax	72	70
Estate and gift taxes	21	28
Customs duties	18	18
Other miscellaneous receipts	47	35
Total	1,743	1,827

== Total Outlays ==
Outlays by budget function (in millions)

Function	Title	Actual
050	National Defense	$274,769
150	International Affairs	$15,239
250	General Science, Space and Technology	$18,084
270	Energy	$911
300	Natural Resources and Environment	$23,943
350	Agriculture	$22,879
370	Commerce and Housing Credit	$2,641
400	Transportation	$42,532
450	Community and Regional Development	$11,865
500	Education, Training, Employment and Social Services	$50,605
550	Health	$141,048
570	Medicare	$190,447
600	Income Security	$242,478
650	Social Security	$390,037
700	Veterans Benefits and Services	$43,155
750	Administration of Justice	$26,536
800	General Government	$15,363
900	Net Interest	$229,755
920	Allowances	$-
950	Undistributed Offsetting Receipts	$−40,445
	Total	$1,701,842
