= Wealth Transfer Group =

American estate planning services firm

The Wealth Transfer Group is a consulting firm that provides estate planning services. They serve only clients with estates worth more than US$10,000,000.

In 2006, the Wealth Transfer Group sued former Aetna CEO John Rowe for infringement of a tax patent. The patent, U.S. patent 6,567,790, entitled "Establishing and managing grantor retained annuity trusts funded by nonqualified stock options", covers WTG's SOGRAT (Stock Option Grantor Retained Annuity Trust) system of minimizing gift tax. The case has been settled for undisclosed terms.

The SOGRAT case is often cited both by those that favor tax patents as well as those that seek to have them banned.

On January 12, 2011, the director of the USPTO initiated a reexamination of US patent 6,567,790. The reexamination serial number is 90/009,868.

== See also ==
Tax patent
