= John Rowe (Aetna) =

American physician and businessman

Jack Rowe

Personal details
- Born: June 20, 1944 (age 82)
- Spouse: Valerie DelTuffo
- Education: Canisius College (BS); University of Rochester (MD)

John Wallis Rowe is an American businessman and academic physician, who was chairman and CEO of Aetna Inc., a health insurance company based in Connecticut, until he retired in February 2006.

During his Aetna tenure, Businessweek named Rowe as a “Manager of the Year.” After leaving the company, he became an active philanthropist, supporting aging research and other causes.

== Career ==
=== Columbia University ===
Rowe has been the Julius B. Richmond Professor at Columbia University's Mailman School of Public Health in the Department of Health Policy and Management. He has also was a professor at Harvard Medical School, authoring more than 200 scientific publications, mostly on the aging process.

Rowe was previously Chairman of the Board of Trustees at the University of Connecticut. In 2010, he donated $2 million to the university’s foundation for a program that encourages students from minority groups and low-income families to enter health professions. Rowe also gave a separate $1 million for aid to help students recover from the COVID-19 pandemic.

=== Aetna ===
Prior to Columbia, John Rowe was the CEO and executive chairman of the health insurance company Aetna from 2000 to 2006. During his tenure, he transformed Aetna into a large, profitable company. Between May 2001 and March 2007, the company's stock price jumped from $5.80 to $43.87 a share. By the mid-2000s, Aetna’s operating income recovered from a $300 million loss to a $1.7 billion gain. In 2005, Rowe's compensation was $22.2 million.

=== Mount Sinai New York Health ===
Prior to Aetna, Rowe was President and Chief Executive Officer of Mount Sinai New York Health from 1998 to 2000. Before that, he was President of The Mount Sinai Hospital and the Mount Sinai School of Medicine in New York City from 1988 to 1998.

In 1998, Rowe led the (now dissolved) Mount Sinai NYU Health merger that brought together five hospitals, becoming the system's president and chief executive.

=== Tax patents ===
In 2006, the Wealth Transfer Group sued Rowe for infringement of a tax patent. The patent was U.S. patent 6,567,790, entitled "Establishing and managing grantor retained annuity trusts funded by non-qualified stock options" (i.e. SOGRAT). The case was settled for undisclosed terms.

=== Publications ===
Rowe has published more than 200 scientific publications, mostly in the field of gerontology, and a textbook in the same field.

He co-authored the book Successful Aging with Robert Kahn.

== Personal life ==
Raised in Wood-Ridge, New Jersey, Rowe graduated from St. Peter's Preparatory School. Rowe attended Canisius College and received his B.S. in 1966. He received his M.D. from the University of Rochester in 1970.

Rowe lives in New York City and Cape Cod, Massachusetts with his wife, who is a retired professor at Fordham University.

Rowe has been a Director of the MacArthur Foundation Research Network on Successful Aging and is currently Director of the Foundation's Research Network on an Aging Society.

He is a member of the Institute of Medicine of the National Academy of Sciences, a fellow of the American Academy of Arts and Sciences, a member of the Board of Trustees of the Rockefeller Foundation, a member of the Board of Trustees of the Lincoln Center Theater, a member of the Board at Accolade Inc. and Hospital Corporation of America (HCA), and former Chairman of the Board of the Marine Biological Laboratory.

In 2019, Rowe was honored at the fourth Arthur W. Page Center Awards in New York City. He received a Larry Foster Award for Integrity in Public Communication.

Rowe is a former member of the Medicare Payment Advisory Commission and Board of Trustees at the University of Connecticut.
