= OneSource =

OneSource may refer to:

- Onesource State Apportionment, a tax product by Thomson Reuters
- Vocabulary OneSource, a data analysis tool used internally by U.S. Air Combat Command
