= One Big Beautiful Bill Act =

2025 legislation in the United States

- Long title: An Act to provide for reconciliation pursuant to title II of H. Con. Res. 14.
- Acronyms (colloquial): OBBBA, OBBB, BBB
- Enacted by: the 119th United States Congress

Citations
- Public law: Pub. L. 119–21 (text) (PDF)
- Statutes at Large: 139 Stat. 72

Codification
- Acts amended: Tax Cuts and Jobs Act

Legislative history
- Introduced in the House as H.R. 1 by Jodey Arrington (R–TX) on May 20, 2025; Committee consideration by House Budget Committee; passed committee on May 18, 2025 (17-16); Passed the House on May 22, 2025 (215–214–1); Passed the Senate on July 1, 2025 (51–50) with amendment; House agreed to Senate amendment on July 3, 2025 (218–214); Signed into law by President Donald Trump on July 4, 2025

ITEP estimates Trump's taxes on Feb 23, 2026, and combines Trump's tariffs at the time, expirations of health care tax credits, and the One Big Beautiful Bill Act tax changes.

The One Big Beautiful Bill Act (OBBBA), or the Big Beautiful Bill (P.L. 119-21), is a U.S. federal statute passed by the 119th United States Congress containing tax and spending policies that form the core of President Donald Trump's second-term agenda. The bill was signed into law by Trump on July 4, 2025. Although the act is popularly referred to as the One Big Beautiful Bill Act, this official short title was removed from the bill during the Senate amendment process. Therefore, the law has no official short title.

The OBBBA contains hundreds of provisions. It permanently extends the individual tax rates Trump signed into law in 2017, which were set to expire at the end of 2025. It raises the cap on the state and local tax deduction to $40,000 for taxpayers making less than $500,000, with the cap reverting to $10,000 after five years. The OBBBA includes several tax deductions for tips, overtime pay, auto loans, and creates Trump accounts, allowing parents to create tax-deferred accounts for the benefit of their children, all set to expire in 2028. It includes a permanent $200 increase in the child tax credit, a 1% tax on remittances, and a tax hike on investment income from college endowments. It phases out some clean energy tax credits that were included in the Biden-era Inflation Reduction Act, and promotes fossil fuels over renewable energy. It increases a tax credit for advanced semiconductor manufacturing and repeals a tax on firearm silencers.

It raises the debt ceiling by $5 trillion while making a significant 12% cut to Medicaid spending. The OBBBA expands work requirements for SNAP benefits (formerly called "food stamps") recipients and makes states responsible for some costs relating to the food assistance program. The OBBBA includes $150 billion in new defense spending and another $150 billion for border enforcement and deportations. The law increases the funding for Immigration and Customs Enforcement (ICE) from $10 billion to more than $100 billion by 2029, making it the single most funded federal law enforcement agency.

The Congressional Budget Office (CBO) estimates the law will increase the budget deficit by $2.8 trillion by 2034 and cause 10.9 million Americans to lose health insurance coverage. Further CBO analysis estimated the highest 10% of earners would see incomes rise by 2.7% by 2034 mainly due to tax cuts, while the lowest 10% would see incomes fall by 3.1% mainly due to cuts to programs such as Medicaid and food aid. Several think tanks, experts, and opponents criticized the bill over its regressive tax structure, described many of its policies as gimmicks, and argued the bill would create the largest upward transfer of wealth from the poor to the rich in American history, exacerbating inequality among the American population. It has also drawn controversy for rolling back clean energy incentives and increasing funding for immigration enforcement and deportations. According to multiple polls, a majority of Americans oppose the law.

Democratic opposition to the health spending cuts included in the OBBBA contributed to the 2025 United States federal government shutdown.

== Background ==
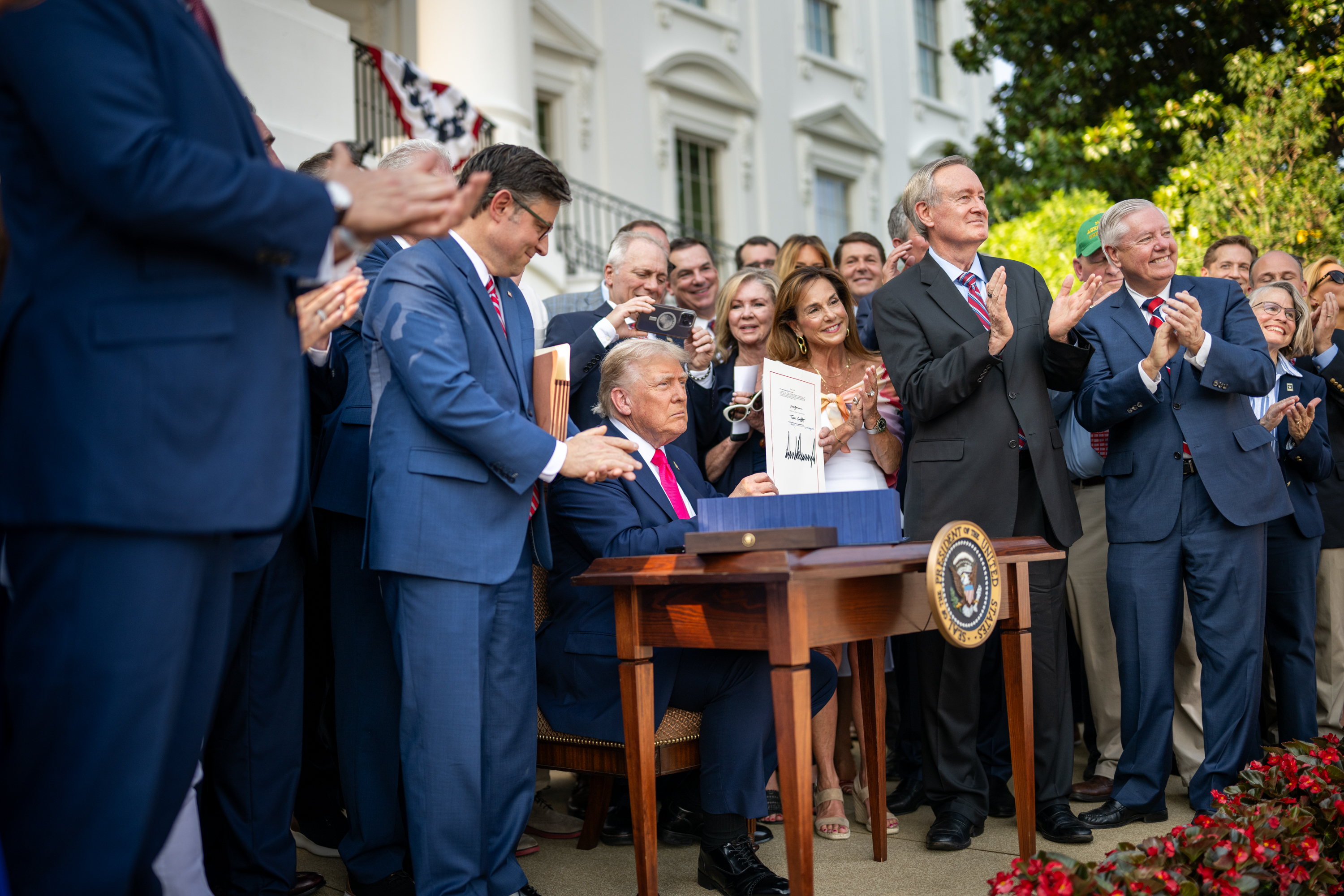
President Trump signing the One Big Beautiful Bill Act into law on the White House South Lawn on July 4, 2025

Following the 2024 United States elections, in which the Republican Party retained the House of Representatives and won the Senate, Republicans began negotiations on passing then-president-elect Donald Trump's domestic policies. In a meeting with Senate Republicans in December 2024, Senate majority leader John Thune outlined an approach involving initial legislation on border security, energy production, and the military while reserving tax policy. Trump, in contrast, advocated for a singular bill to resolve an impending lapse in tax cuts implemented in the Tax Cuts and Jobs Act in 2017. However, this strategy faced risks from defecting members.

In January 2025, Republicans met in Fort Lesley J. McNair. At the meeting, Speaker of the House Mike Johnson stated that Trump sought "one big, beautiful bill" to enact his policies. To more easily pass the bill, Republicans chose to use the budget reconciliation process, which allowed them to avoid the 60-vote Senate filibuster, which carried importance as they hold 53 seats out of 100 in the Senate. This requires the House and the Senate to pass identical instructions before passing the actual reconciliation bill.

Before being signed into law, the Senate approved the bill 51–50 on July 1, 2025, with Vice President JD Vance casting a tiebreaking vote in support. It passed the House of Representatives, 218–214, on July 3, 2025. It passed over universal Democratic opposition in both houses.

== Provisions ==
The One Big Beautiful Bill Act includes hundreds of provisions, and over a ten-year period is estimated to add roughly $3 trillion to the national debt and to cut approximately $4.46 trillion in tax revenue.

=== Individual income taxes ===
==== Extending 2017 tax cuts ====
The law permanently extends the individual tax rates Trump signed into law in 2017, which were set to expire at the end of 2025.

==== Tax deduction for qualified overtime income ====
The law creates a new tax deduction of up to $12,500 ($25,000 if married filing jointly) of qualified overtime pay, effective January 1, 2025. A worker who is married but files separately from their spouse is not eligible for the tax deduction. A worker must have a social security number in order to be eligible for the tax deduction.

Qualified overtime pay is compensation that an employer is required to pay an employee under the Fair Labor Standards Act, Section 7 because the employee worked more than 40 hours during the same workweek. The employee may take a tax deduction only for the extra half-time pay above their usual hourly rate they are paid for working more than 40 hours during the same workweek, not all the pay they receive for working those hours. Overtime paid that is either paid voluntarily by an employer, is paid based on contractual agreements, or is only required by state or local laws is not eligible for the tax deduction.

The tax deduction begins to phase out for individuals whose modified adjusted gross income is more than $150,000 (or $300,000 if married filing jointly), and is eliminated at $400,000 (or $550,000 if married filing jointly). (Note: Modified adjusted gross income is the sum of adjusted gross income and all gross income excluded as foreign earned income, foreign housing allowance, Guam-source income, American Samoa-source income, Northern Mariana Islands-source income, or Puerto Rico-source income.)

Individuals may take a tax deduction for the amount of qualified overtime compensation that appears on their Form W-2, up to annual limits. For 2025, employers may use a reasonable method to approximate the amount to put on a Form W-2 or via an alternate method. For 2026 and subsequent years, qualified overtime compensation must be reported on Form W-2, box 12, code TT. (Note: Reporting is different if the worker is an employee of the employer according to the Fair Labor Standards Act but is treated as an independent contractor by the Internal Revenue Code. In these rare cases, the worker's pay must be reported on Form 1099-MISC box 14 or Form 1099-NEC box 1d.) Employers must report all qualified overtime compensation without regard to the tax limit of $12,500 ($25,000 if married filing jointly).

An employee who is actively engaged in the management of their employer and owns at least a 20-percent equity interest in it is not eligible to take the tax deduction.

Overtime compensation is not excluded or exempt from gross income. Employers continue to be required to withhold income taxes, social security taxes, and Medicare taxes from workers' overtime pay. An employee is allowed, however, to give their employer an updated Form W-4 that includes their acticipated tax deduction for qualified overtime compensation in Step 4(b).

==== Tax deduction for qualified tip income ====
The law creates new tax deductions for tips of up to $25,000 per year received by workers earning less than $150,000, with the tax deduction set to expire in 2028.

In order to be eligible, a tip must be paid voluntarily by the payor, and the payor must determine the amount of the tip. The payor must not be subject to a penalty if they do not pay a tip, and the tips must not be subject to any negotiation.

The tip must be given to workers working one of 68 different job types. (Note: According to a preliminary list released by the U.S. Department of Treasury, the occupations are bartenders, wait staff, food services in non-restaurants, dining room and cafeteria attendants and bartender helpers; chefs and cooks; food preparation workers; fast food and counter workers; dishwashers; restaurant hosts; bakers; gambling dealers; gambling change persons and booth cashiers; gambling cage workers; gambling and sports book writers and runners; dancers; musicians and singers; DJs not working in radio; entertainers and performers; digital content creators; ushers, lobby attendants, and ticket takers; locker room, coatroom, and dressing room attendants; baggage porters and bellhops; concierges; hotel, motel, and resort desk clerks; maids and housekeeping cleaners; home maintenance and repair workers; home landscaping and groundskeeping workers; home electricians; home plumbers; home heating and air conditioning mechanics and installers; home appliance installers and repairers; home cleaning service workers; locksmiths; roadside assistance workers; personal care and service workers; private event planners; private event and portrait photographers; private event videographers; event officiants; pet caretakers; tutors; nannies and babysitters; skincare specialists; massage therapist; barbers, hairdressers, hairstylists, and cosmetologists; shampooers; manicurists and pedicurists; eyebrow threading and waxing technicians; makeup artists; exercise trainers and group fitness instructors; tattoo artists and piercers; tailors; shoe and leather workers and repairers; golf caddies; self-enrichment teachers; recreational and tour pilots; tour guides and escorts; travel guides; sports and recreation instructors; parking and valet attendants; taxi and rideshare drivers and chauffeurs; shuttle drivers; goods delivery people; personal vehicle and equipment cleaners; private and charter bus drivers; water taxi operators and charter boat workers; rickshaw, pedicab, and carriage drivers; and home movers.)

Tips received while performing a service that is a felony or misdemeanor are not eligible. (Note: The federal register gives an example of a bartender who works in a jurisdiction where a license or certification is required by law in order to work in that occupation but the bartender does not have that license or certification. The tips given to that bartender would not be eligible.) Tips received for prostitution or pornography are not eligible.

Tips received as part of a tip pool are generally eligible. Tips received directly by a supervisor or manager are eligible only if they are for services they provided in a qualified occupation and not as part of a tip pool.

If the customer is charged a service charge or an automatic tip amount that is not voluntary on the part of the customer, then the service charge or tip is not eligible. This includes if the company requires a customer to pay a service charge or a particular tip amount on parties greater than a certain size. Voluntary tips above such a minimum or mandatory charge are eligible. Recommended tips are eligible if they are optional on the part of the payer.

If the customer is required to select a tip amount but does not have the option to choose to not tip at all, the minimum possible tip amount is not eligible but any tips exceeding that minimum are eligible.

If a customer has the right to receive additional goods or services in exchange for a voluntary tip, the tip is not eligible.

The tax deduction is not allowed if the individual is married and files their federal income tax return separately from their spouse.

The tax deduction is not allowed if the individual does not include their social security number on their federal income tax return or if the social security number was issued on or after the due date, including extensions, of the federal income tax return .

For a self-employed individual who receives tips in the course of their trade or business, eligible tips are tax deductible but they cannot create a net loss for the trade or business.

==== Tax deductible for loan interest for U.S.-assembled cars ====
The law allows individuals to deduct up to $10,000 per year in auto loan interest for new cars that had their final assembly in the United States and were purchased between January 1, 2025, and December 31, 2028.

The vehicle must be for personal use, rather than business use. It must be a car, minivan, van, sport utility vehicle, pickup truck, or motorcycle with a gross vehicle weight rating of less than 14,000 pounds. All-terrain vehicles, trailers, campers, used vehicles, and leased vehicles are not eligible. The vehicle's Automobile Information Disclosure label must show that the place of its final assembly was the United States. The maximum tax deduction is reduced out for individuals whose modified adjusted gross income is greater than $100,000 (or $200,000 for married couples filing jointly), and it is eliminated for individuals whose modified adjusted gross income is greater than $150,000 (or $250,000 if married filing jointly). A taxpayer is not required to itemize their tax deductions in order to take the tax deduction.

From 2025 to 2028, auto loan lenders are required to report loan details to the Internal Revenue Service if they receive at least $600 of interest on qualifying vehicle loans.

==== Increased limit for tax deductions for state and local taxes ====
From January 1, 2025, to December 31, 2029, individuals may take a tax deduction for up to $40,000 of state and local taxes ($20,000 if married filing separately), which is an increase from $10,000 previously. There is a reduction to the limit for the tax deduction for individuals whose modified adjusted gross income is over $500,000 ($250,000 for married filing separately) but it never goes below $10,000.

This provision has an estimated cost of $142 billion. Republican representatives Elise Stefanik, Mike Lawler, Nick LaLota, and Andrew Garbarino of New York, Representative Young Kim of California, and Representative Tom Kean Jr. of New Jersey cut this deal with House speaker Mike Johnson in exchange for their votes.

==== Tax credit for seniors ====
The law permanently eliminates the personal exemption, which had been temporarily eliminated by the Tax Cuts and Jobs Act of 2017. It offers a temporary tax deduction, set to expire in 2028, of up to $6,000 for seniors. The deduction phases out for individuals with modified adjusted gross income (MAGI) exceeding $75,000 (or $150,000 for married couples). According to the Council of Economic Advisors, this would result in 88% of seniors being able to claim enough deductions to clear their Social Security tax burden, up from 64% under prior law. A taxpayer is not required to itemize their tax deductions in order to take the tax deduction.

==== Child tax credit ====
The law increases the maximum amount of the child tax credit from $2,000 to $2,200 per child, and indexes the amount of the credit to inflation and only applies to U.S citizens or qualifying noncitizens. (Note: For the child tax credit, a qualifying noncitizen is an individual (or their spouse, if married filing jointly) who has a social security number that is valid for U.S. employment and that was assigned to them before their income tax return's due date including extensions.) The refundable portion of the credit is also indexed to inflation, but is not increased, meaning that tax credit beneficiaries would not see a net increase in the credit, when adjusted for inflation.

==== Adoption tax credit ====
The law changes the existing nonrefundable tax credit for up to $17,280 of qualified adoption expenses. As of January 1, 2025, up to $5,000 of the adoption tax credit is a refundable tax credit.

==== Charitable contributions tax deduction ====
Effective January 1, 2026, the law allows a tax deduction for charitable contributions made in cash by an individual who does not itemize their tax deductions. The deduction is limited to $1,000 (or $2,000 if married filing jointly). The deduction is not allowed for contributions to donor-advised funds or private non-operating foundations. Carrying over excess charitable contributions to other years is not allowed if the person does not itemize their tax deductions.

Effective January 1, 2026, for individuals who itemize their tax deductions, a tax deduction is allowed only for the amount that exceeds 0.5 percent of their adjusted gross income. (Note: For this purpose, adjusted gross income is calculated without reducing it by the amount of charitable contributions made.)

The law makes permanent a temporary limit on cash tax deductions for charitable contributions of up to 60 percent of their adjusted gross income to 501(c)(3) public charities. This only applies if the individual itemizes their tax deductions.

Effective January 1, 2026, the tax benefit for charitable contributions made by an individual that itemizes their tax deductions is limited to 35% of the amount contributed, even if they are in a marginal tax bracket higher than 35%.

==== Educator tax deduction ====
Previously, educators could take a tax deduction for unreimbursed education costs of up to $300 per year (or $600 if married filing jointly) without itemizing their tax deductions. Effective January 1, 2026, eligible educators may also take an itemized tax deduction for unreimbursed education costs in excess of $300 per year (or $600 if married filing jointly). In order to qualify, the individual must work at any K–12 school for least 900 hours during the school year as a teacher, instructor, counselor, principal, aide, interscholastic sports coach, or sports administrator. The unreimbursed education costs must be directly related to the individual's work as an educator. Eligible unreimbursed education costs include books, supplies, other classroom materials, equipment, professional development courses or training that is related to the curriculum or student instruction.

==== Clean vehicle and clean energy home improvement tax credits eliminated ====
The tax credit for buying a new qualified electric vehicle or fuel cell electric vehicle is no longer available for purchases made after September 30, 2025. The tax credit for buying a used qualified electric vehicle or fuel cell vehicle from a licensed dealer is no longer available for purchases made after September 30, 2025.

The tax credit for installing property to either recharge electric vehicles or to store or dispense clean-burning fuel will no longer be available after June 30, 2026.

The tax credit for making qualified energy-efficient improvements to one's home will no longer be available for improvements put into service after December 31, 2025.

The tax credit for installing solar electric panels, solar water heaters, wind turbines, geothermal heat pumps, fuel cells, or battery storage technology in one's home will no longer be available for improvements made after December 31, 2025.

==== Limitation on overall itemized deductions ====
Itemized deductions are reduced by 2/37 of the lesser of the amount of the itemized tax deductions or the taxable income that is within the 37%-rate marginal tax bracket. (Note: For 2025, the 37%-rate tax bracket applies to taxable income exceeding $626,350 (or $751,600 if married filing jointly). These are adjusted for inflation each year.)

As an exception, the qualified business income deduction under 26 U.S.C. § 199A is not subject to the limitation.

==== Remittance tax ====
Effective January 1, 2026, the law establishes a 1% excise tax on certain electronic transfers of funds from the United States to a foreign country. (Note: The House bill called for a 3.5% tax, but would have reimbursed U.S. citizens. The Senate version, which was eventually enacted, was estimated to raise up to $10 billion over 10 years.) The tax is on the electronic transfer of funds from an individual located in any U.S. state, U.S. territory, or the District of Columbia to a recipient in a foreign country for personal, family, or household purposes.

The excise tax is assessed on electronic transfers sent using cash, money orders, cashier's checks, prepaid card reloads, wire transfers, online bill payments, and similar methods. The excise tax is assessed on the amount transferred and not on any fees that the sending institution charges the sender to complete the transfer. The excise tax is supposed to be paid by the sender of the remittance; the transfer provider must pay the excise tax if the sender does not. A transfer to a U.S. military base located in a foreign country are considered to be received in the United States and is not subject to the remittance tax. Additionally, transfers of $15 or less are not subject to the remittance tax.

Certain transfers are exempt, such as those from financial accounts held at institutions subject to the Bank Secrecy Act, such as U.S. banks, U.S. credit unions, U.S. investment companies, and certain U.S. branches of foreign banks; transfers paid with a U.S.-issued debit or credit card; and transfers of cryptocurrency.

==== Estate tax, gift tax, and generation-skipping transfer tax ====
The estate, gift, and generation-skipping transfer tax exemption will increase from $13.99 million in 2025 to $15 million in 2026. The exemption amounts for subsequent years will be indexed for inflation.

==== Qualified small business stock gain exclusion ====
The Omnibus Budget Reconciliation Act of 1993 allowed noncorporate taxpayers who acquired qualified small business stock and held the stock for more than five years to exclude from capital gain recognition of up to $10 million or 10 times the taxpayer's basis in the stock, which ever was greater. In order for the stock to qualify, the issuing corporation's aggregate gross assets needed to be no more than $50 million immediately before or after the stock issuance.

The OBBBA changed the requirement to hold the stock for at least five years. For qualified small business stock acquired after July 4, 2025, a 50% exclusion is available for stock held at least three years, a 75% exclusion is available for stock held for at least four years, and a 100% continues to be available for stock held for at least five years.

The OBBBA also increased the exclusion's limit to $15 million or 10 times the taxpayer's basis in the stock, which ever was greater. The $15-million limit will be subject to annual inflation adjustments in 2027 and thereafter.

In addition, the OBBBA now allows the issuing corporation to have an aggregate gross asset limitation of up to $75 million for stock issued after July 4, 2025. The $75-million limit will be subject to annual inflation adjustments in 2027 and thereafter.

=== Business income taxes ===
==== Tax deduction for executive compensation ====
Public companies are not allowed to take a tax deduction for compensation paid to certain executives that exceeds $1 million per year. Effective tax years beginning after December 31, 2026, the compensation paid to the five most highly compensated executives is expanded to all members of a covered corporation's controlled group and affiliated service group. The tax deductible portion of compensation is allocated to each control group member based on the pro-rata portion of the compensation paid by that member.

==== Depreciation tax deduction ====
For qualified production property of a taxpayer, the law makes permanent a 100% Section 179 depreciation deduction for the adjusted basis for the property acquired after January 19, 2025.

Businesses are allowed to take a section 179 tax deduction for the cost of certain business property, software, leasehold improvements, and water utility property rather than deduct only the amount depreciated each year. Under the law, the maximum tax deduction is permanently increased from $1 million to $2.5 million and then phased out to $4 million, all of which will be indexed for inflation in future years. These changes are effective for tax years beginning after December 31, 2024.

The law also created a new depreciation allowance for nonresidential real property that is used as an essential part of an activity that includes the manufacturing, production, or refining of certain tangible products that significantly transforms the product. Types of property that do not qualify include nonresidential real property used for offices, administrative services, lodging, parking, sales activities, software development, and software engineering. The property's construction must begin between January 20, 2025, and December 31, 2028, and it must be placed in service in the U.S. or U.S. possessions on or before December 31, 2030.

==== Domestic research and experimentation tax deduction ====
The law allows full expensing of domestic research and experimentation expenditures for tax years beginning on or after January 1, 2025.

The law allows businesses to hold an election to amortize domestic research and experimentation expenditures that are otherwise capitalized (other than property that would be depreciated or depleted) over a five-year period.

The law allows certain businesses to elect to claim a tax deduction for unamortized domestic research and experimentation costs in the first tax year beginning after 2024 or ratably over a two-year period.

The law allows certain small businesses (Note: For this purpose, a small business is one with up to $25 million in average gross receipts during the 3-year period preceding its first tax year that begins after December 31, 2024.) to retroactively expense its domestic research and experimentation costs for tax years that began on or after January 1, 2022.

==== Business interest tax deduction ====
The law changes the calculation of the limit on interest expense tax deductions such that deductions for depreciation, amortization, or depletion are excluded when calculating adjusted taxable income.

==== Tax deduction for pass-through entities ====
The 20% deduction for qualified business income for owners of pass-through entities was made permanent.

==== Tax credit for semiconductor manufacturing ====
The law increases the CHIPS and Science Act's tax credit for advanced semiconductor manufacturing from 25% to 35%.

==== Tax deduction for energy efficient commercial buildings ====
The tax credit for energy efficient commercial buildings is no longer available for any property if the construction begins after June 30, 2026.

==== Tax credits for affordable housing and poorer neighborhoods ====
The law expands the Low-Income Housing Tax Credit with a housing credit allocation increase and a bond threshold test reduction, projected to add up to 1.22 million additional affordable rental homes from 2026 to 2035. To incentivize business investments in poorer neighborhoods, the law makes the LIHTC permanent, along with the New Markets Tax Credit Program and Opportunity Zones, restructuring the latter with tighter accountability standards, although the law does not create any new legal incentives for affordable housing or industrial lands cleanup.

==== Deductions for certain workers' meals ====
The law allows a tax deduction for restaurants and caterers for the cost of providing a free meal to workers while on shift. Companies can also take a tax deduction for the cost of free meals provided to workers on offshore oil rigs and gas platform workers. Companies that are required to provide meals to maritime crew under federal law may also take a tax deduction for the cost of those meals.

==== Expansion of FICA tip credit to beauty services businesses ====
Beauty service businesses are now allowed a tax credit for the FICA taxes they pay on their employees' tips that bring them up to the federal minimum wage. Prior to this, only food or beverage businesses were eligible for this tax credit. The change is effective for tax years beginning after December 31, 2024.

==== Metallurgical coal tax credit ====
The law establishes a new 2.5% tax credit for metallurgical coal. (Note: Metallurgical coal is mostly used for applications such as steel production. About 77% of U.S. production of this type of coal is exported for the production of steel overseas;)

==== Charitable contributions tax deduction ====
As of 2026, corporations may take a tax deduction for charitable contributions for the amount that exceeds 1 percent of its taxable income and does not exceed 10 percent of its taxable income. Charitable contributions that do not qualify for a tax deduction because of this change may be carried forward for five years.

==== Foreign-derived intangible income ====
The law reduced the tax rate on foreign-derived intangible income to 14 percent.

==== Tax deduction for whaling ====
The law increases the tax deduction for whaling boat captains increasing maximum deduction from $10,000 of whale hunting expenses up to $50,000.

=== Tax-exempt organizations ===
==== Excess compensation ====
Effective in 2026, certain tax-exempt organizations (Note: For this purpose, certain tax-exempt organizations are those that are tax-exempt from taxation under any section of 501(c), 521(b)(1), or 527, or that has tax-exempt income described in 26 U.S.C. §§ 115–1.) must pay an excise tax on compensation exceeding $1 million paid to any current and former employee, rather than only to its top five most highly compensated employees for current and prior years.

==== Educational institutions ====
The law changes the excise tax on the investment income of tax-exempt educational institutions. There are three different excise tax rates, and the highest excess tax rate is 8 percent. The excise tax rate depends on the institution's ratio of its investment assets to its eligible students. Institutions with higher ratios are subject to higher excise tax rates.

==== College endowments ====
The law increases taxes on investment income from college endowments, estimated to raise $761 million over 10 years. Colleges with more than 3,000 students and an endowment per student ratio of $500,000 would be taxed starting at 1.4%, with the tax rate increasing to 8% for the wealthiest colleges. The original House bill proposed a tax of up to 21% with no exemptions based on size. An exemption for religious colleges was removed for violating the Byrd Rule.

=== Health and welfare ===
==== Medicare drug negotiation ====
The law allows more drugs to be purchased outside of Medicare's price negotiation program. The Congressional Budget Office estimated $5 billion in lost savings for the government over ten years.

==== Medicaid expansions ====
The law establishes a $50 billion Rural Hospital Fund, up from $25 billion, to support health care providers in rural areas, providing a safety net against Medicaid cuts; and it authorizes CMS to approve new Medicaid HCBS waivers to allow non-nursing-home-eligible persons to participate.

==== Medicaid restrictions and funding cuts ====
The law cuts over $1.2 trillion in federal spending, primarily from the low-income health insurance program Medicaid and the nutrition funding program SNAP. The law:

- Cuts the Medicaid provider tax, which helps states fund their Medicaid costs, from 6% to 3.5% by 2031;
- Adds work requirements for Medicaid recipients for the first time, with individuals ages 19 to 64 required to work at least 80 hours per month, and this requirement can also be met through volunteer work or school. Some exemptions exist for adults with dependent children ages 14 and under and those with medical conditions.
- Requires states to charge enrollees in Medicaid expansion states with family incomes between 100 and 138 percent of the federal poverty level up to $35 for each health care service, if they qualify for Medicaid based on income alone.
- Requires states to check eligibility of people on Medicaid expansion every six months instead of annually;
- Prevents expansion states from using state contributions to pay Medicaid providers higher prices than Medicare would pay;
- Requires minimum staffing ratios for nursing homes;
- Requires a five-year waiting period for green card holders before applying to Medicaid, and reduces retroactive Medicaid payments from three months to one month;
- Limits premium tax credits for immigrants;
- Reduces Medicaid payments to states with errors and other improper payments; and
- Prohibits Medicaid from being used for funding Planned Parenthood and similar organizations for one year. In July 2025, Planned Parenthood sued the Trump administration over the provision and a federal judge issued a temporary injunction on the provision. In September 2025, the First U.S. Circuit Court of Appeals overrode the injunction, allowing defunding.

==== Supplemental Nutrition Assistance Program (SNAP) ====
The law:

- Requires Supplemental Nutrition Assistance Program (federal food assistance) beneficiaries ages 18 to 64 to work at least 80 hours per month, compared to ages 18 to 54 under current law;
- Requires states with an error rate above 6% to contribute to up to 15% of SNAP benefit costs. Alaska and Hawaii received special exemptions for these effective cuts after lobbying from senators Lisa Murkowski and Dan Sullivan;
- Repeals the National Education and Obesity Prevention Grant Program;
- Reduces federal nutrition funding by $186 billion between 2025 and 2034. Increases the share of state costs to administer the SNAP program from 50% to 75%; and
- Restricts future updates to the Thrifty Food Plan used to calculate SNAP benefit levels.

==== Health savings accounts ====
Individuals covered by a bronze-level or a catastrophic health plan offered in the individual market on a state insurance exchange are now allowed to make and receive health savings account contributions.

The law made permanent a temporary rule that allowed health plans to cover telehealth services without a deductible and still be compatible with a health savings account.

The law allows a high-deductible health plan to provide benefits for direct primary care to enrollees who have not yet met the deductible and still be eligible for a Health Savings Account. In order to qualify, the direct primary care services needs to be for a flat fee of up to $150 per month for a single individual (or $300 per month for multiple individuals). These services are also added to the definition of medical expenses for a health savings account.

=== Trump accounts and contribution pilot program ===
The law creates Trump accounts, a type of tax-advantaged savings investment account.

Any individual is allowed to contribute to a child's account, up to $5,000 per year per child. Employers are allowed to contribute to their employees' accounts and their employees' children's accounts, up to $2,500 per year. Contributions by an employer count against the $5,000 annual limit per child, but contributions by the federal government do not. As an exception to the annual limit, tax-exempt organizations are allowed to contribute an unlimited amount into a child's account.

Contributions into a child's account are allowed until the end of the end of the year in which the child turns 18.

The federal government will contribute $1,000 into a Trump account for each U.S. citizen child with a social security number who was born between January 1, 2025, and December 31, 2028.

Funds in the account must be invested in mutual funds or exchange-traded funds that mirror the S&P 500 or another U.S. stock index. Investment earnings are tax-deferred.

A child with a qualified disability (Note: A qualified disability is a disability that qualifies for Supplemental Security Income or Social Security Disability Insurance benefits or blindness before the age of 26 is eligible. Qualified disabilities include autistic spectrum disorder, asperger's disorder, developmental delays, learning disabilities, intellectual disabilities, schizophrenia, major depressive disorder, Post-Traumatic Stress Disorder, anorexia nervosa, attention deficit/hyperactivity disorder, bipolar disorder, blindness, deafness, cerebral palsy, muscular dystrophy, spina bifida, juvenile-onset Huntington's disease, multiple sclerosis, severe sensorineural hearing loss, congenital cataracts, chromosomal abnormalities, osteogenesis imperfecta, xeroderma pigmentosum, spinal muscular atrophy, Fragile X Syndrome, Edwards Syndrome, cystic fibrosis, Tetralogy of Fallot, hypoplastic left heart syndrome, end-stage liver disease, juvenile-onset rheumatoid arthritis, sickle cell disease, and hemophilia.) is allowed to rollover the funds into an ABLE account when they reach age 17.

For other children, rollovers and withdrawals from the account are allowed starting on the January 1 of the year in which the child turns age 18. When the child reaches age 18, the funds will be rolled into a traditional IRA.

Contributions by the federal government or an employer are tax-exempt (i.e., they are not taxed as income of the child when they are deposited), while contributions by the child or their parents are neither tax-exempt nor tax-deductible (i.e., they are taxed as income of the child or a gift to the child and they come from after-tax funds of the giver).

Withdrawals are subject to taxation in the same way as traditional IRAs are. (Note: The law considers the Trump accounts to be individual retirement accounts with the exception of guidance by the Treasury Secretary or the Trump account section of the law itself.)

Trump accounts will be available for initial deposits on July 4, 2026.

=== Limits on green industrial policy ===
The law phases out tax credits passed in the Biden-era Inflation Reduction Act. Credits will continue for wind and solar projects which either start construction by June 2026 or which go online by December 2027, under "safe harbor" and expanded "foreign entity of concern" provisions. (Note: The Senate version of the bill added a slower timeline than the House version of the bill.) (Note: "Foreign entity of concern" provisions are meant to limit participation in new projects by Russia, Iran, North Korea and China and their citizens; China's inclusion is notable due to its centrality to many global energy supply chains. They were included in the original IRA but rewritten under the OBBBA.) The OBBBA directed the Treasury Department to issue more stringent standards for documenting supply chains and construction of solar and wind facilities in August 2025. The OBBBA also severely limits the credits' transferability in dedicated markets. Electric vehicle tax credits would be phased out by September 2025, and EV charging tax credits would be phased out by June 2026.

Green hydrogen production credits are terminated by December 2027, rather than 2033. Home electrification credits are terminated by December 2025. Advanced manufacturing, carbon sequestration, biofuel, and nuclear power credits remain largely intact (nuclear power even gets a new 10% bonus credit), subject to the aforementioned foreign entity of concern rules. Fees on methane emissions that polluters have to pay the government would be postponed for 10 years, while tax credits for biofuels would be extended an additional four years to 2031.

The law also rescinds various funds, appropriated in the IRA. These include:

- freeway removal incentives,
- heavy-duty alternative fuel vehicle grants,
- grants for training contractors to perform home electrifications,
- grants for environmental justice promotion,
- grants for improvements to state and local environmental impact assessment capacity, and
- the EPA's green bank, the Greenhouse Gas Reduction Fund.

=== Provisions on agriculture ===
The law rescinds unobligated IRA funding for the Conservation Stewardship Program, Environmental Quality Incentives Program, Agricultural Conservation Easements Program, and Regional Conservation Partnership Program, and adds it to the USDA budget baseline. The OBBBA outlaws climate action-related goals for agriculture. The law also lifts income caps on households that rely on agriculture for more than 75% of their income, potentially empowering corporate farming.

The law raises reference prices under the Price Loss Coverage and Agricultural Risk Coverage programs, resulting in $54 billion in additional spending over 10 years. The law increases spending on crop insurance programs by $6.3 billion over 10 years and disaster relief programs at USDA by $2.9 billion in the same timeframe.

=== Leasing and sale of public lands ===
The law requires the leasing of at least 50% of public lands that private companies desire to lease for drilling, mining or logging. It cuts the royalties (the share of revenue) that the petroleum industry has had to pay for oil and gas extracted from public lands—costing taxpayers around $6 billion over a decade. It cuts the fee per acre that oil and gas companies have had to pay for initiating leasing of public lands. The law reinstates "noncompetitive leasing" of public lands for drilling, mining or logging that allows companies to purchase at a cheap price public lands that were not sold at auction.

Over the next decade, the law requires four lease sales to oil and gas companies of lands inside Arctic National Wildlife Refuge, and six lease sales in the National Petroleum Reserve-Alaska along Alaska's northern coast.

The law requires the Bureau of Land Management to hold quarterly onshore oil and gas lease sales.

=== Debt ceiling ===
The law raises the United States debt ceiling by $5 trillion.

=== Military defense features ===
The defense portion of the law allocates an additional $150 billion in defense spending. This figure includes:

- $29 billion for shipbuilding;
- $25 billion for a proposed "Golden Dome" missile defense system;
- $25 billion for munitions;
- $25 billion for various infrastructure and housing improvements.
- $25 billion for the U.S. Coast Guard;
- $16 billion for military innovation and artificial intelligence, including money for kamikaze drones, uncrewed aircraft systems, drone boats, and underwater drones;
- $15 billion for nuclear deterrence; and
- $12 billion for improving military operations in the Indo-Pacific.

=== Border security ===
The law includes $170 billion for spending on border security, creating the capacity to deport up to one million people each year.

The law increases the funding for Immigration and Customs Enforcement from $10 billion to more than $100 billion by 2029, making it the single most heavily funded law enforcement agency in the federal government. These funds include:

- $46.5 billion to build a wall on the United States–Mexico border;
- $45 billion over four years in order to add 100,000 new migrant detention beds. This is a 365% increase in Immigration and Customs Enforcement's budget for detentions;
- $29.9 billion to Immigration and Customs Enforcement for hiring new agents and covering transportation and deportation costs, with the aim of hiring 10,000 new officers;
- $17.3 billion to support state and local law enforcement with border enforcement;
- $10 billion to reimburse the Department of Homeland Security for costs related to border security;
- $7.8 billion for hiring Border Patrol agents and vehicles, with the aim of hiring 3,000 new agents;
- $6.2 billion for border technology; and
- $3.3 billion for hiring immigration judges and staff.

=== Asylum fees and immigration ===
The law establishes a $100 annual fee to apply for asylum, down from $1,000 in the House bill, a $550 fee to apply for employment authorization for asylum seekers and migrants on humanitarian parole or temporary protected status, and a $500 fee to apply for temporary protected status. It also increases the fees for non-immigrant visas to $250.

=== Student loans ===
The law:

- Pauses a rule issued under the Biden administration to cancel student loans if schools engaged in deceptive recruiting;
- Caps unsubsidized student loans for graduate students at $20,500 per year and $100,000 lifetime;
- Caps student loans for students seeking professional degrees, such as medical school or law school, at $50,000 per year and $200,000 lifetime, and eliminates graduate PLUS loans;
- Establishes a lifetime student loan borrowing limit of $257,000;
- Restructures income-based repayment programs; and
- Expands Pell Grants to cover workforce-training programs.

=== Expansions to 529 education cost plans ===
A 529 plan will be allowed to distribute funds for the cost to attend an elementary or secondary school, including a public, private, or religious school, after July 4, 2025. Eligible costs include tuition, curriculum and curricular materials, books, instructional materials, online educational materials, and tuition for certain tutoring or educational classes outside one's home.

A 529 plan will be allowed to distribute funds for eligible costs of a state and federal licensing program, an industry certification program, or a registered apprenticeship program after July 4, 2025. Eligible costs include tuition, fees, books, supplies, required testing, and continuing education needed to maintain the credential.

=== Employee benefits ===
==== Employer-provided childcare credit ====
As of January 1, 2026, the employer-provided childcare credit (26 U.S.C. § 45F) is increased from 25% to 40% (or 50% for eligible small businesses (Note: An eligible small business has gross receipts of up to $31 million for the preceding five years. The threshold will be inflation adjusted in future years.)) of qualified childcare expenses. The maximum employer-provided childcare tax credit is increased from $150,000 to $500,000 per year (or $600,000 for eligible small businesses).

The act also expands qualified childcare expenses to include contracted third parties that provide childcare to the employees.

==== Dependent care flexible spending accounts ====
The annual limit for a dependent care flexible spending account is increased from $5,000 per year (or $2,500 if married filing separately) to $7,500 (or $3,750 if married filing separately).

==== Paid leave while on Family and Medical Leave Act leave ====
The temporary tax credit for employers who give paid leave to an employee while they are on Family and Medical Leave Act leave has been made permanent.

In order to qualify for the tax credit, the employer must pay the employee at least 50% of the employee's usual wages. The amount of the tax credit used to be equal to 12.5% of eligible wages paid to an eligible employee, but it now increases by 0.25% for each percentage point paid above the 50% threshold, up to a maximum credit of 25%.

In order to be eligible for the tax credit, the employee must have worked at least six months for the employer, which is up from 12 months previously.

Paid family and medical leave that is required under state or local law is now eligible for the tax credit, as are employer-paid amounts for qualifying paid leave insurance policies.

==== Meals ====
Food or beverage provided to employees on certain fishing vessels or certain fish processing facilities for the employer's convenience is 100% tax deductible to the employer, up from 50% previously.

==== Moving ====
Employer-paid moving expense benefits were temporarily considered taxable income to the employee, but they are now permanently taxable income. Moving expense benefits for employees who are active-duty members of the U.S. Armed Forces or members of the U.S. Intelligence Community continue to be tax-free to the employee.

==== Bicycle commuting benefits ====
For employer-reimbursed bicycle commuting benefits, these payments are considered taxable income to the employee.

==== Student loan repayments ====
Student loan repayments made by employers to their employees were temporarily tax-free to the employees but they are now permanently tax-free. The tax-free limit per year will be indexed for inflation starting in 2026.

=== 1099 reporting ===
A payor must report payments for goods or services via payment apps, online marketplaces, and payments from credit, debit, or gift cards to the Internal Revenue Service and the payee on Form 1099-K. The law changes the threshold for reporting; now reporting on Form 1099-K is required if a person received at least 200 transactions and received at least $20,000.

The law increases the reporting threshold for Form 1099-MISC and Form 1099-NEC from $600 to $2,000 in 2026. The threshold will be adjusted for inflation for future years.

=== Miscellaneous ===
The law contains the following additional provisions:

- Provides a $12 billion boost in air traffic control funding;
- Provides a new $10 billion for NASA. This includes $700 million for a Mars Telecommunications Orbiter (later renamed the Mars Telecommunications Network); $2.6 billion for the Lunar Gateway space station; $4.1 billion for the development of the Space Launch System rockets for the Artemis IV and Artemis V missions; $20 million for the Artemis IV Orion spacecraft; $1.25 billion for International Space Station operations throughout 2030; $325 million for the US Deorbit Vehicle; $1 billion for improvements at five NASA centers ($120 million for Stennis, $250 million for Kennedy, $300 million for Johnson, $100 million for Marshall, and $30 million for Michoud); $85 million to transfer a space vehicle to a field center that is involved in the administration of the Commercial Crew Program (aimed at moving Space Shuttle Discovery to the Johnson Space Center);
- Halves funding for the Consumer Financial Protection Bureau.
- Provides $40 million for the National Garden of American Heroes;
- Requires the FCC and NTIA to identify and auction 600 MHz of the electromagnetic spectrum between 1.3 and 10 GHz by 2034, potentially raising up to $85 billion;
- Eliminates the tax on making or transferring silencers, short-barreled rifles, short-barreled shotguns and "any other weapons" under the National Firearms Act setting it to $0 starting January 1, 2026. The $200 tax stays for machine guns and destructive devices;
- Expands the Radiation Exposure Compensation Act to people affected by nuclear development and testing; and
- Repeals the international package de minimis entry privilege, which allowed shipments under $800 to enter the U.S. tariff-free.
- Eliminates penalties for noncompliance with Corporate Average Fuel Economy standards.

== Legislative history ==
=== Budget framework negotiations ===
Initially, on February 21, 2025, the Senate approved S. Con. Res. 7 by 52–48, intended to be the first of two reconciliation instruction bills. The resolution allowed for a future reconciliation bill containing $175 billion for immigration and border enforcement, $150 billion for the military and would not extend the 2017 Trump tax cuts. Senator Rand Paul of Kentucky was the only Republican to oppose the resolution. The Senate intended to allow the House to pass reconciliation instructions first. At the time of the bill's passage, the House faced opposition to its one-bill approach from fiscally conservative members.

On February 25, 2025, the House of Representatives approved H. Con. Res. 14 by a 217–215 vote. The resolution would allow Republicans to pass a budget containing tax cuts while reducing federal spending. The resolution would also allow Congress to raise the debt limit by $4 trillion. The resolution was briefly pulled due to opposition from fiscally conservative Republicans Thomas Massie of Kentucky, Tim Burchett of Tennessee, Warren Davidson of Ohio, and Victoria Spartz of Indiana. Leadership convinced all but Massie to support the resolution, and the vote happened as scheduled. Initially, some moderate Republicans also expressed opposition over the possibility that the resolution would necessitate cuts to Medicare and Medicaid. In the end, Massie was the only House Republican to vote against the resolution.

In the early hours of April 5, 2025, the Senate approved an amended version of H. Con. Res. 14 by a 51–48 vote. The Senate budget resolution calls for $4 billion in spending cuts, significantly lower than the $1.5 trillion in cuts called for by the House. The Senate resolution also calls for a $5 trillion raise in the debt limit, $1 trillion more than the House resolution. The House and the Senate resolutions would each extend Trump's 2017 tax cuts.

Republican senators Susan Collins of Maine and Rand Paul of Kentucky joined all Democratic senators in opposing the resolution. After the vote, Reuters reported that non-partisan analysts believe that the resolution, if enacted as currently written, would add $5.7 trillion to the national debt of the United States over the next 10 years. Republicans argue that the extension of the 2017 tax cuts, which expire at the year's end, should not be counted as new debt, which means that only $1.5 trillion would be added to the national debt over the next 10 years.

The House had to pass the Senate's amended resolution to continue the reconciliation process. House Republican leadership intended to vote on the resolution on April 9. The resolution was pulled due to opposition from 12 fiscally conservative Republicans. The resolution passed the following morning in a 215–214 vote after the Senate pledged also to seek at least $1.5 trillion in cuts. Fiscally conservative Republicans Thomas Massie and Victoria Spartz were the only members of their party to vote against the resolution.

=== First House passage ===
Following markups by various House committees on their relevant portions of the bill, the House Budget Committee met on May 16, 2025, to combine the various markups into a single reconciliation bill. Some fiscally conservative Republicans opposed the bill over a desire for greater spending cuts, and the bill was rejected in a 21–16 vote, with representatives Chip Roy of Texas, Ralph Norman of South Carolina, Andrew Clyde of Georgia, and Josh Brecheen of Oklahoma joining all Democratic committee members to vote against it. Republican Lloyd Smucker of Pennsylvania changed his vote from yes to no so that he would be allowed to bring a motion to reconsider the bill at a later time.

On May 18, the Budget Committee voted to advance the bill in a 17–16 vote. Roy, Norman, Clyde, and Brecheen changed their votes to present after House Republican leadership agreed to make Medicaid work requirements—previously scheduled to begin in 2029—kick in sooner and decrease future subsidies for clean energy. Despite this, the four Republicans said they would not support the bill's final passage unless more changes were made. Republicans did not secure these votes until May 21, when the bill was amended.

On the morning of May 22, the United States House of Representatives passed OBBBA by a vote of 215–214–1, mostly along party lines. Fiscally conservative Republicans Thomas Massie and Warren Davidson broke from their party to vote against the bill. Freedom Caucus chair Andy Harris of Maryland voted present. Republicans David Schweikert of Arizona and Andrew Garbarino of New York did not vote on the measure. House Democrats unanimously opposed OBBBA.

On June 10, Republicans announced that they would amend OBBBA through a procedural rule. By using a procedural rule to amend the bill, Republicans voting against amendments would also be voting against consideration of other, unrelated bills. The rule passed, 213–207, with Massie the only present Republican to vote against the rule.

==== Democratic reaction ====
The narrow passage of OBBBA led to internal backlash and division in the Democratic Party. Three elderly Democratic representatives (Raúl Grijalva of Arizona, age 77; Sylvester Turner of Texas, age 70; and Gerry Connolly of Virginia, age 75) died in the first five months of 2025. If any of the three had been alive when the vote was taken, the result of the vote could have been different. The vote "quickly reignited an intraparty debate about gerontocracy and aging politicians clinging to power".

=== Senate passage ===
The House sending the Bill to the Senate, May 22, 2025

Following the House passage of OBBBA, the bill moved to the Senate for consideration.

The Republican-led Senate amended the bill. Fiscally conservative Republican Senators (nicknamed "deficit hawks") such as Ron Johnson of Wisconsin, Rick Scott of Florida, Mike Lee of Utah, and Rand Paul of Kentucky, pushed for deeper spending cuts. Moderate Republicans such as Susan Collins of Maine, Lisa Murkowski of Alaska, and Jerry Moran of Kansas, along with populist Josh Hawley of Missouri, expressed concerns about Medicaid cuts. Other moderates such as John Curtis of Utah and Thom Tillis of North Carolina, along with Murkowski and Moran, expressed concerns over the end of green energy tax credits. Defense hawks such as Mike Rounds of South Dakota were opposed to spectrum auction provisions in the bill.

Democrats in the Senate sought to use the Byrd Rule, which prevents reconciliation from being used to pass "extraneous" measures in bills which increase federal spending in the Senate, in order to strip certain provisions from the bill. Democrats argued that the extension of Trump's 2017 tax cuts, a proposed 10-year ban on state level AI regulations, language that limits the power of federal court to enforce contempt of court citations, a provision to end a tax on the manufacturing of gun silencers, a provision to defund Planned Parenthood, a provision banning Medicaid from funding gender-affirming care for people of all ages and a provision to streamline permits for fossil fuel projects, violated the Byrd Rule.

Senate majority leader John Thune set a goal of passing the Senate's version of OBBBA by July 4, 2025.

On June 20, 2025, the Senate parliamentarian, Elizabeth MacDonough, ruled that several provisions from the Senate committees on Banking, Environment and Public Works, and Armed Services violated the Byrd Rule and could not be included in a 50-vote reconciliation bill. The bill will no longer be able to include a funding cap on the Consumer Financial Protection Bureau, $1.4 billion in pay cuts to Federal Reserve staff, a $293 million cut in funding for the Office of Financial Research, the elimination of the Public Company Accounting Oversight Board, a repeal of portions of the Inflation Reduction Act, a repeal of the Environmental Protection Agency's "multipollutant emissions standards" for certain vehicles built after the 2026 model year, and a provision to cut funding for the Department of Defense if spending requests are not made on time.

By June 24, the parliamentarian also ruled against a provision that would make it harder for a plaintiff to sue in order to impose injunctions or restraining orders against the federal government, a provision allowing states to conduct enforcement at the United States border, a provision forcing the United States Postal Service to sell electric vehicles, the REINS Act, a provision to allow developers to bypass environmental review by paying a fee, and a provision forcing states to pay at least 5% of SNAP costs. By June 27, the Parliamentarian had ruled against a provision to remove taxes on gun silencers and against a provision to expand Pell grants for short term training programs for workforces.

JD Vance casting the tie-breaking vote, July 1, 2025

On June 28, the Senate voted on a procedural motion to begin debate on the bill. Initially, fiscal conservatives Ron Johnson and Rand Paul, along with moderate Thom Tillis, voted against the motion, while fiscal conservatives Rick Scott, Mike Lee, and Cynthia Lummis, as well as moderate Lisa Murkowski, withheld their votes. After hours of negotiations, which resulted in Alaska specific provisions for Murkowski and Republican leadership support for an amendment vote that would result in increased Medicaid cuts targeted at the fiscal conservatives, Johnson, Scott, Lee, Lummis and Murkowski voted for the motion.

The passage of the motion to proceed began the "vote-a-rama" process, in which senators can propose an unlimited number of amendments to the bill. Before it could begin, Democrats required the clerks of the Senate to read the entire 940 page bill in order to highlight Medicaid cuts. The vote-a-rama began two days later, on June 30, in the early morning. One of the few successful amendment votes, passing 99–1, removed the proposed AI law moratorium. The vote-a-rama set a record for the most amendment votes in Senate history.

After an over 24-hour vote-a-rama, the bill passed the Senate on July 1, 2025, in a mostly party-line 51–50 vote. All Senate Democrats voted against the bill, and Republicans Rand Paul, Thom Tillis, and Susan Collins of Maine broke from their party to vote against the bill as well. Faced with a tie vote, Republican vice president JD Vance cast a tie-breaking vote in favor of the bill.

=== Second House passage ===
The House of Representatives needed to pass the Senate version of the OBBBA for the bill to reach the President's desk. On July 1, 2025, President Trump and Senate majority leader Thune expressed confidence that the bill would pass in the House. House Republican moderates such as David Valadao and Young Kim of California, and Jeff Van Drew of New Jersey, who are against Medicaid cuts, Nick LaLota of New York, who is against SALT changes, and fiscal conservatives such as Chip Roy and Keith Self of Texas, who oppose federal deficit increases, had expressed opposition by June 30 to the bill in its then-current form.

The House Rules Committee voted 7–6 on July 1, 2025, to advance the bill to the floor. Fiscal conservative Republicans Chip Roy and Ralph Norman voted against advancing the bill. Usually, the members of the majority party on the Rules Committee always vote to advance the bill to the floor.

A procedural vote on July 2, 2025, while negotiations were ongoing off the House floor, was the longest vote in House history.

In the early morning of July 3, 2025, the House approved the final procedural rule vote 219–213. The vote, which began on the evening of July 2, was initially opposed by five Republicans: moderate Brian Fitzpatrick of Pennsylvania and fiscal conservatives Victoria Spartz of Indiana, Andrew Clyde of Georgia, Keith Self of Texas, and Thomas Massie of Kentucky. Eight other fiscal conservative Republicans, including Tim Burchett of Tennessee and Chip Roy of Texas, withheld their votes. After hours of negotiations with President Trump and Speaker Johnson, all but Fitzpatrick flipped their votes to advance the rule.

Starting at 4:52 a.m., House minority leader Hakeem Jeffries delivered a lengthy speech using the "magic minute" to delay the passage of the bill, eventually breaking the 8 hour and 32 minute record set by Kevin McCarthy in 2021.

On July 3, the House of Representatives passed the Senate version of the OBBBA in a final mostly party-line vote of 218–214. Republican moderate Brian Fitzpatrick and fiscal conservative Thomas Massie, along with all Democrats, voted against the bill.

On July 4, President Trump signed the bill into law at a ceremony at the White House.

=== Final Senate vote ===
Vote to pass the One Big Beautiful Bill Act
July 1, 2025	Party			Total votes
July 1, 2025	Democratic	Republican	Independent	Total votes
Yea	0	51	0	51 (Note: Republican vice president JD Vance cast the tie-breaking vote, voting for the bill's passage.)
Nay	45	3	2	50
Result: Passed
Roll call vote on the passage: Senator / Party / State / Vote; Angela Alsobrooks / D / Maryland / Nay; Tammy Baldwin / D / Wisconsin / Nay; Jim Banks / R / Indiana / Yea; John Barrasso / R / Wyoming / Yea; Michael Bennet / D / Colorado / Nay; Marsha Blackburn / R / Tennessee / Yea; Richard Blumenthal / D / Connecticut / Nay; Lisa Blunt Rochester / D / Delaware / Nay; Cory Booker / D / New Jersey / Nay; John Boozman / R / Arkansas / Yea; Katie Britt / R / Alabama / Yea; Ted Budd / R / North Carolina / Yea; Maria Cantwell / D / Washington / Nay; Shelley Moore Capito / R / West Virginia / Yea; Bill Cassidy / R / Louisiana / Yea; Susan Collins / R / Maine / Nay; Chris Coons / D / Delaware / Nay; John Cornyn / R / Texas / Yea; Catherine Cortez-Masto / D / Nevada / Nay; Tom Cotton / R / Arkansas / Yea; Kevin Cramer / R / North Dakota / Yea; Mike Crapo / R / Idaho / Yea; Ted Cruz / R / Texas / Yea; John Curtis / R / Utah / Yea; Steve Daines / R / Montana / Yea; Tammy Duckworth / D / Illinois / Nay; Dick Durbin / D / Illinois / Nay; Joni Ernst / R / Iowa / Yea; John Fetterman / D / Pennsylvania / Nay; Deb Fischer / R / Nebraska / Yea; Ruben Gallego / D / Arizona / Nay; Kirsten Gillibrand / D / New York / Nay; Lindsey Graham / R / South Carolina / Yea; Chuck Grassley / R / Iowa / Yea; Bill Hagerty / R / Tennessee / Yea; Maggie Hassan / D / New Hampshire / Nay; Josh Hawley / R / Missouri / Yea; Martin Heinrich / D / New Mexico / Nay; John Hickenlooper / D / Colorado / Nay; Mazie Hirono / D / Hawaii / Nay; John Hoeven / R / North Dakota / Yea; Jon Husted / R / Ohio / Yea; Cindy Hyde-Smith / R / Mississippi / Yea; Ron Johnson / R / Wisconsin / Yea; Jim Justice / R / West Virginia / Yea; Tim Kaine / D / Virginia / Nay; Mark Kelly / D / Arizona / Nay; John Neely Kennedy / R / Louisiana / Yea; Andy Kim / D / New Jersey / Nay; Angus King / I / Maine / Nay; Amy Klobuchar / D / Minnesota / Nay; James Lankford / R / Oklahoma / Yea; Mike Lee / R / Utah / Yea; Ben Ray Luján / D / New Mexico / Nay; Cynthia Lummis / R / Wyoming / Yea; Ed Markey / D / Massachusetts / Nay; Mitch McConnell / R / Kentucky / Yea; Dave McCormick / R / Pennsylvania / Yea; Jeff Merkley / D / Oregon / Nay; Ashley Moody / R / Florida / Yea; Jerry Moran / R / Kansas / Yea; Bernie Moreno / R / Ohio / Yea; Markwayne Mullin / R / Oklahoma / Yea; Lisa Murkowski / R / Alaska / Yea; Chris Murphy / D / Connecticut / Nay; Patty Murray / D / Washington / Nay; Jon Ossoff / D / Georgia / Nay; Alex Padilla / D / California / Nay; Rand Paul / R / Kentucky / Nay; Gary Peters / D / Michigan / Nay; Jack Reed / D / Rhode Island / Nay; Pete Ricketts / R / Nebraska / Yea; Jim Risch / R / Idaho / Yea; Jacky Rosen / D / Nevada / Nay; Mike Rounds / R / South Dakota / Yea; Bernie Sanders / I / Vermont / Nay; Brian Schatz / D / Hawaii / Nay; Adam Schiff / D / California / Nay; Eric Schmitt / R / Missouri / Yea; Chuck Schumer / D / New York / Nay; Rick Scott / R / Florida / Yea; Tim Scott / R / South Carolina / Yea; Jeanne Shaheen / D / New Hampshire / Nay; Tim Sheehy / R / Montana / Yea; Elissa Slotkin / D / Michigan / Nay; Tina Smith / D / Minnesota / Nay; Dan Sullivan / R / Alaska / Yea; John Thune / R / South Dakota / Yea; Thom Tillis / R / North Carolina / Nay; Tommy Tuberville / R / Alabama / Yea; Chris Van Hollen / D / Maryland / Nay; Mark Warner / D / Virginia / Nay; Raphael Warnock / D / Georgia / Nay; Elizabeth Warren / D / Massachusetts / Nay; Peter Welch / D / Vermont / Nay; Sheldon Whitehouse / D / Rhode Island / Nay; Roger Wicker / R / Mississippi / Yea; Ron Wyden / D / Oregon / Nay; Todd Young / R / Indiana / Yea

== Removed provisions ==
The following provisions were at one point included in the bill, but were removed:

- Before OBBBA was passed, it contained a provision which would prevent federal courts from using appropriated funds to enforce findings of contempt of court for non-compliance with any court injunctions or court-issued temporary restraining orders, if no bond is posted by plaintiffs;
- The House-passed version of the OBBBA included a 10-year moratorium on state-level enforcement of any law or regulation regulating artificial intelligence (AI). This was removed in a 99–1 vote after it became clear that it would not pass;
- An excise tax on solar and wind energy projects was added in the Senate, and then removed;
- A raised tax on foreign investments after opposition from Treasury Secretary Scott Bessent;
- A proposal from Senator Mike Lee to sell millions of acres of federal land in the Western United States; and
- A proposal to stop payments to Affordable Care Act plans that pay for abortions outside of cases involving rape, incest, or danger to the life of a mother.

Additionally, many provisions in the House bill were removed to comply with the Byrd rule in the Senate. These included:

- The official short title of the bill;
- A ban on pharmacy benefit managers using spread pricing;
- A ban on the use of federal funds in Medicaid, the Children's Health Insurance Program (CHIP) and the Affordable Care Act from being used to pay for gender-affirming care for adults and children (the Crenshaw Amendment) starting in 2027;
- Changes to the Medicaid funding formula to increase benefits for Alaska and Hawaii;
- An expansion of Pell Grants to cover workforce-training programs (the parliamentarian approved a modified version);
- Requiring states that use their own funds to offer health insurance for illegal immigrants to pay a higher Medicaid funding;
- Limitations on the pandemic-era employee retention tax credit;
- $2 billion allocated for Pentagon military intelligence programs and $500 million allocated for missile development;
- A policy that would have ended SNAP assistance for some households that are also eligible for other assistance; and
- A provision to allow mining around the Boundary Waters wilderness.

== Impact ==
=== National debt ===
The Congressional Budget Office (CBO) initially estimated that the OBBBA would add $2.4 trillion to the national debt of the United States by 2034. (Note: Attributed to multiple sources:) The CBO later raised the estimated increase in the budget deficit to $2.8 trillion.

=== Risk to the social safety net ===
CBO estimates OBBBA would cause 10.9 million Americans to lose health insurance coverage. (Note: Attributed to multiple sources:) Other estimates of this figure said it would strip nearly nine million people of their coverage, leaving between 10.3 million to 14 million people uninsured. The bill's cuts to Medicaid were the largest in the program's history and put rural hospitals at risk of closure with one clinic attributing their announced closure to the bill. The loss of coverage for millions of Americans is expected to strain the finances of hospitals, nursing homes, and community health centers, which will be left to absorb more of the cost of treating the uninsured. Further CBO analysis released August 11, 2025, estimated that the highest 10% of earners would see incomes rise by 2.7% by 2034 mainly due to tax cuts, while the lowest 10% would see incomes fall by 3.1% mainly due to cuts to programs such as Medicaid and food aid. Analysis of the bill by the CBO and multiple think tanks found it to be one of the most regressive bills in decades.

The Center for a Responsible Federal Budget estimates that the bill will accelerate the estimated insolvency of Social Security and Medicare by one year. Experts have argued that the bill would create the largest upward transfer of wealth from the poor to the rich in American history due to large-scale benefit cuts paired with tax breaks for high-income earners and corporations.

=== Clean energy roll-back ===
The bill was described by The New York Times as derailing renewable energy production and research in the United States, and possibly ceding the clean energy race to China. Its policies favor fossil fuel companies over renewable energy such as solar, wind, and EV manufacturing, and are expected to lead to large clean energy job losses and factory closures and to deter investment in clean technologies. Specifically, the law phases out most clean-energy tax incentives introduced under the Biden-era Inflation Reduction Act such as credits for low-carbon electricity (wind, solar), electric vehicle rebates, home electrification, clean hydrogen, and domestic manufacturing of batteries and solar panels. The law rescinds various IRA funds for grants related to freeway removal improving biking and walking in poorer neighborhoods, electric truck and bus manufacturing, faster state and local environmental reviews and place-based green industrial policy and home electrification.

An April 2026 study projected the IRA's impact on clean energy investments would be nearly wiped out by the OBBBA, and emissions would be reduced by only 34 percent below 2005 levels, compared to 44 percent with the IRA. A report released by environmental group BlueGreen Alliance found that the OBBBA caused 223 manufacturing and clean energy projects to stall or be cancelled, affecting over 111,000 jobs and $82.9 billion in investment. A July 2026 estimate by the group E2 found that the OBBBA had eliminated a projected 467,000 jobs for green-collar workers and caused a $68.2 billion reduction in capital investments, with grid storage batteries and solar power being the most affected industries. However, Lily Bermel of Columbia University, writing for MIT that same month, estimated that 67-74 percent of the clean energy production gains spurred by the IRA would be retained due to robust domestic demand, though the most adversely affected sector would be onshore wind.

=== Expanded immigration enforcement ===
The U.S. government has allocated unprecedented funding to ICE for detention facilities, deportation operations, and additional funds to hire new agents. The law allocates ICE with more funding than any federal law enforcement agency in U.S. history, and more than the federal prison system. The expanded ICE funding is expected to lead to mass detentions and deportations, restricted access to asylum, and anticipated economic and humanitarian consequences.

=== Education access ===
The law adds new accountability rules for colleges and expanded grant eligibility to short-term training programs, eliminates subsidized graduate loans, sets an annual limit on unsubsidized graduate loan amounts, and restructures income-driven repayment plans that could raise monthly payments and delay loan forgiveness. In K–12 education, it established the Federal Education Freedom Tax Credit Program, a federal tax credit for donations to private school scholarship funds. Critics warned the law could reduce college access for low-income and working students, divert public funds to private schools, and increase pressure on under-resourced school systems. Proponents characterized it as an important victory for school choice at the national level.

=== Health insurance coverage ===
The Congressional Budget Office (CBO) estimated in mid-2025 that the law would increase the number of people without health insurance by 10 million in 2034, compared with its January 2025 projections. That is lower than the 10.9 million CBO had estimated for the version the House passed in May 2025. CBO projected that changes to Medicaid and the Children's Health Insurance Program (CHIP) would account for 7.5 million of the 2034 increase, and changes to the Affordable Care Act marketplaces for 2.4 million. The increase is expected to build over several years, from 1.3 million in 2026 to 5.2 million in 2027 and 8.6 million in 2029. The 10 million figure does not count the end of the enhanced ACA premium tax credits, which earlier law had scheduled to expire at the end of 2025. KFF reported that CBO's estimates put the combined increase from both changes at more than 14 million in 2034.

==== Medicaid work requirements ====
The largest single source of projected coverage loss is the new Medicaid work requirement. Beginning January 1, 2027, most adults ages 19 to 64 enrolled through Medicaid expansion must complete 80 hours a month of work, schooling, job training or community service, unless they qualify for an exemption. CBO estimated that the requirement alone would leave 5.3 million more people uninsured in 2034, and that eligibility checks every six months for expansion adults would add 700,000 more. Both figures are before accounting for how the provisions interact.

The Centers for Medicare and Medicaid Services (CMS) issued an interim final rule on the requirement on June 1, 2026. The agency estimated that 2.3 million people would lose Medicaid coverage in 2027 and 3.3 million by 2036. The Center on Budget and Policy Priorities argued that the rule defines medical frailty more narrowly than CMS had told states earlier, and that this would increase the number of eligible people who lose coverage. Nebraska began enforcing the requirement on May 1, 2026, ahead of the federal deadline.

== Reception ==
=== Public perception ===
Multiple polls were conducted in June 2025 with general skepticism and disapproval from Americans.

- According to a Pew Research poll, 49% of Americans opposed the bill, 29% were in favor of the bill, and 21% were unsure.
- According to an IPSOS-Washington Post poll, 42% of Americans opposed the bill, 23% were in favor of the bill, and 23% were unsure.
- According to a Fox News poll, 59% of Americans opposed the bill, 29% were in favor.
- According to KFF, 64% of Americans opposed the bill, 35% were in favor.

NPR noted that the bill's passage fulfilled several of Trump's campaign promises, but also violated his promise not to touch Medicaid benefits. CNN described its passage as made possible despite intraparty opposition as an example of "Trump's iron grip on his own party" and an "omnipresent" effort to get Republicans on board despite its unpopularity with the American public.

In June 2026, nearly one year after the bill's passage, a Navigator Research poll found that 34% of Americans approved of the law, 53% disapproved, and 13% were unsure.

=== Support ===
According to the White House's website, whitehouse.gov, more than 200 organizations have stated their support for the OBBBA, including AT&T, Comcast, American Airlines, Delta Air Lines, the National Retail Federation, and the National Taxpayers Union.

Trump has claimed that the bill is the "single most popular bill ever signed", a claim that CNN disputed, saying "That is an up-is-down reversal of reality. ... While polls can be off, this bill wouldn't be popular – let alone the most popular US bill ever signed – even with a massive and widespread polling error."

=== Opposition ===
==== Upward wealth transfer ====
The Atlantic, CNBC, The New York Times, and Vox argued that the bill would create the largest upward transfer of wealth from the poor to the rich in American history, with Fortune and CNN nicknaming it the "Reverse Robin Hood Bill", Senate Minority Leader Chuck Schumer (D-NY) mockingly called the bill the "We're All Going to Die Act", alluding to comments made by Republican Senator Joni Ernst (R-IA) at a town hall.

==== Adverse effects on public health ====
Public health and policy researchers at Yale University and the University of Pennsylvania sent a letter to Senate leaders warning that cuts to health programs in the bill would lead to over 51,000 preventable deaths annually.

==== Greater ICE enforcement and deportations ====
Many Democratic and legal organizations have shared warnings about the expansion of immigration enforcement. Rep. Alexandria Ocasio-Cortez shared, "I don't think anyone is prepared for what they just did with ICE. This is not a simple budget increase. It is an explosion—making ICE bigger than the FBI, US Bureau of Prisons, DEA, and others combined. It is setting up to make what's happening now look like child's play. And people are disappearing."

==== Dismantling clean energy initiatives ====
The nonpartisan think tank Energy Innovation found that the bill's efforts to dismantle clean energy incentives would cost more than 830,000 jobs across the country. Cutting clean energy incentives would also raise energy costs for households, with wholesale power prices rising by roughly fifty percent by 2035 due to the loss of new generation capacity.

==== Fiscal instability ====
The tax cuts included in the bill are predicted to greatly increase the federal debt in proportion to the GDP of the U.S. economy. Among other destabilizing effects, this may increase the cost of government borrowing as bond buyers demand a higher interest rate on new debt. Moody's, which rates bonds, was the final of the three credit rating agencies to downgrade U.S. debt from AAA, citing efforts to pass the bill.

On June 28, the Committee for a Responsible Federal Budget (CRFB) said of the Senate version of the bill:

Although we have not produced a full estimate of the bill, it appears to add roughly $4 trillion to the debt through 2034, including interest – which is roughly $1 trillion higher than the House-passed version of the bill. That cost could rise above $5 trillion if temporary provisions were made permanent.

==== Unfavorable public opinion ====
Polling indicates that a majority of Americans opposed its previous provisions to ban state regulation of artificial intelligence. The provision was seen as irresponsible by researchers who believe that artificial superintelligence is imminent. Others feared that it would have prevented regulation of AI-generated child pornography and deepfakes, made certain privacy laws obsolete, and further centralized power in the federal government. Representative Marjorie Taylor Greene (R-GA) stated that she would have voted against the bill if it had returned to the House with the restrictions on AI legislation.

==== Elon Musk ====
Former close ally Elon Musk, then-de facto head of the Department of Government Efficiency (DOGE), denounced the bill as a massive spending bill; he later called it a "disgusting abomination". Some Republican senators have come out in support of Musk's opinion. Republican opposition to the bill has been associated with the libertarian faction of the party. As Rand Paul backed Musk's criticism of the bill, others have criticized Paul's Senate Homeland Security and Governmental Affairs Committee proposals for requiring new federal employees to be required to pay a higher FERS contribution rate if they opt for Title 5 benefits while "at will" employees would pay a lower FERS contribution rate. The concern is that the increase in the number of at-will federal employees could allow the president to eliminate a large number of employees for any reason. The bill is credited with starting a public feud between Musk and Trump.

==== Others ====
John Hatton, staff vice president for policy and programs at National Active and Retired Federal Employees Association (NARFE), warned about the following:

It would tax retirement benefits, creating a 5% pay cut for somebody under the system, while also undermining the merit-based civil service by having an additional 5% cut if you decide to retain those merit-based civil service protections. Those protections don't exist for the purpose of the employee – they exist to protect against politically based firings of federal employees.

American Federation of Government Employees (AFGE) national president Everett Kelley stated that:

This so-called reconciliation bill is in fact a big retaliation bill—retaliation against AFGE and other unions for successfully standing up for our members and fighting this administration's illegal attempts to obliterate our federal agencies and the patriotic civil servants who run our federal programs. These provisions represent a direct assault on federal employees and their labor unions and will make it that much harder for federal agencies to recruit and retain the qualified employees they desperately need to serve the American public.

The 2001 recipient of the Nobel Memorial Prize in Economic Sciences, Joseph Stiglitz, was asked about the OBBBA in an interview with Swiss Radio and Television (SRF) as to how he would describe the legislation, to which he had replied:

Outrageous. It exacerbates inequality and social division—one of the main problems of the USA. It deprives vulnerable groups of access to health care. Life expectancy is already declining, and the health differences between rich and poor are enormous. This law exacerbates this.

The nonpartisan Tax Foundation had mixed opinions of the bill, saying it made "some smart cuts", in particular praising the extension of the Tax Cuts and Jobs Act of 2017 which it argued would provide stability for households. It also expressed support for its impacts on counting international business income. It criticized the political nature of the bill, calling it filled with carve-outs and political gimmicks that increased the complexity of the tax code. It also criticized the bill's non-equal application of taxation on citizens.

The Economist described the bill's policies and passage as an example of "America's creeping dysfunction", criticizing its impact on increasing the deficit and describing its tax cuts as "gimmicks". It also criticized Trump's handling of the economy more broadly, saying the bill "illustrates the long-term damage Mr Trump is doing to the foundations of America's economy" and describing its passage as exacerbating the effects of Trump's attacks on the Federal Reserve, defunding of scientific research, high tariff policy, and erosion to the rule of law. It described these cumulative effects as threatening America's economic stability and making it a riskier place to invest.

The New York Times criticized Trump and his Republican allies' promotion of the bill, finding they made multiple false and misleading statements about the bill's impacts with inaccurate claims. It also described it as filled with "a series of novel, populist and temporary cuts that Mr. Trump cooked up during the 2024 campaign to try to win the support of key constituencies" and that it was ultimately an "apotheosis of a traditionally conservative, supply-side philosophy". It described it as "generating little additional economic growth and still returning the largest savings to the rich". It interviewed several conservative tax experts and former Republican aides who described it as "incoherent" and clinging to a traditional Republican economic agenda, only partially offering more temporary benefits to the working class paid for by cutting Medicaid and federal food assistance and refusing to raise taxes on the rich.

== Common misconceptions ==
=== Taxes on social security ===
On July 3, Social Security Administration sent an email suggesting that federal income taxes on Social Security benefits would be eliminated under the bill, but tax experts stated the message was misleading. The law introduces a temporary $6,000 tax deduction for persons aged 65 and older with a certain income, which can reduce federal tax liability from that otherwise owed, but the law does not directly eliminate the taxes on Social Security benefits, which remain in effect under 26 U.S.C. § 86. All revenue from the taxation of Social Security benefits is earmarked for reinvestment into the Social Security Trust Fund, so the deduction would accelerate the insolvency of the Social Security benefits system by limiting this revenue stream.

=== Taxes on tips ===
The No Tax on Tips provisions only reduce federal income tax liability and do not affect tax liability for purposes of the Federal Insurance Contributions Act, which funds Social Security and Medicare, or any other federal, state, or local tax law. The new provision is expected to benefit roughly two thirds of tipped workers. Workers would still need to report tips as taxable income, but the deduction can reduce the federal tax liability otherwise owed.

=== Medicaid and illegal immigrants ===
The bill prompted claims that illegal immigrants receive Medicaid. Illegal immigrants are already ineligible for full Medicaid benefits under the Personal Responsibility and Work Opportunity Act, so many illegal immigrants access state-funded health programs instead. According to a CBO analysis, the bill's provisions could lead some states to cut back those state-funded health programs, potentially causing an estimated 1.4 million people to lose state-level health coverage, including illegal immigrants.

=== Medicaid and unemployment ===
When commenting on the bill's impact on the economy, U.S. secretary of agriculture Brooke Rollins stated that 34 million able-bodied adults on Medicaid should be able to replace the work of farm workers who have been deported. According to the U.S. Government Accountability Office, roughly 70% of adults enrolled in Medicaid and Supplemental Nutrition Assistance Program work at least 35 hours per week; they qualify for assistance because they have low income rather than no income. Overall, it is estimated by The New York Times that only around 3% of Medicaid recipients are both able to work and long-term unemployed.

== Government shutdown ==
After passing the OBBBA, Congress needed to approve a new spending bill to fund the federal government beyond October 1, 2025, when the previous budget expired. The 53 Republican senators had to either eliminate the filibuster or convince at least seven Democrats to join them in order to reach the 60-vote supermajority required to advance their proposal. Most Democrats opposed the Republican plan and requested a compromise that would extend the healthcare subsidies cut by the OBBBA. The resulting stalemate triggered the 2025 United States federal government shutdown, which became the longest government shutdown in U.S. history.

== See also ==
- Bush tax cuts – Changes to the United States tax code during the Bush presidency
- Omnibus spending bill – Type of appropriations bill
- Tax reform – Method of changing compulsory fees or levies as part of broad economic programmes
