= Tax patent =

A tax patent is a patent that discloses and claims a system or method for reducing or deferring taxes. Tax patents have been granted predominantly in the United States but can be granted in other countries as well. They are considered to be a form of business method patent. They are also called "tax planning patents", "tax strategy patents", and "tax shelter patents". In September 2011, President Barack Obama signed the Leahy-Smith America Invents Act passed by the U.S. Congress that effectively prohibits the granting of tax patents in general.

== History ==
The earliest patent that the United States Patent and Trademark Office (USPTO) considers to be a tax patent is Van Remortel et al., U.S. patent 5,136,502 "System for funding, analyzing and managing health care liabilities". This patent issued in 1992 and covers, among other things, a computerized administration system for tax advantaged funding of health care programs for retirees. The United States Congress has never passed a law explicitly allowing tax patents but in 1998, the U.S. Court of Appeals for the Federal Circuit ruled in State Street Bank v. Signature Financial Group that business methods (and hence methods for reducing taxes) have been patentable at least since 1952 when Congress amended the requirements for patentability in the Patent Act of 1952.

== USPTO classification ==
The USPTO has created a patent class for tax patents. The classification is 705/36T.

The USPTO has placed 209 issued US patents and 188 published patent applications in this classification. The USPTO has not, however, published a formal definition of the class.

About 10 new tax patent applications have been filed each year in recent years, and about five new patents have been issued each year. Some applications and issued patents appear to be mischaracterized since they do not deal with taxes.

== Regulation ==
In 2005, The U.S. Internal Revenue Service (IRS) determined that none of the then pending U.S. tax patents contained abusive tax avoidance transactions. Nonetheless, in September 2007, the IRS proposed a set of rules that would require tax filers to disclose whether they have paid a license fee to the holder of a tax patent. Similar to the ban passed by the U.S. House of Representatives, this regulation includes an exemption for patents on software for calculating taxes.

There is some concern in the financial community that complying with these regulations will increase the chances of a tax patent licensee being audited by the IRS and that this, in turn, will decrease the value of tax patents in general. These regulations have, however, been strongly supported by the Section of Taxation of the American Bar Association.

== Examples ==
Examples of tax patents include:

- U.S. patent 6,567,790 Funding of a GRAT with nonqualified stock options.
- U.S. patent 6,292,788 Tax-deferred real estate transaction.
- https://www.investopedia.com/how-vanguard-patented-a-system-to-avoid-taxes-in-mutual-funds-4686985

== Enforcement ==
In 2006, the Wealth Transfer Group sued former Aetna CEO John Rowe for infringement of a tax patent. The patent was U.S. patent 6,567,790, entitled "Establishing and managing grantor retained annuity trusts funded by nonqualified stock options". (i.e. SOGRAT) This case has been settled for undisclosed terms.

== New law ==
On September 8, 2011, the United States Senate passed the Leahy-Smith America Invents Act, which had already been passed by the House of Representatives. The Act is described as "a comprehensive patent reform bill that includes language to stop the U.S Patent and Trademark Office from issuing patents for tax strategy methods." The Act was signed into law by President Barack Obama on September 16, 2011.

Subsection (a) of section 14 of the Act provides (in part):

For purposes of evaluating an invention under section 102 or 103 of title 35, United States Code, any strategy for reducing, avoiding, or deferring tax liability, whether known or unknown at the time of the invention or application for patent, shall be deemed insufficient to differentiate a claimed invention from the prior art.

Subsection (b) of section 14 provides (in part):

For purposes of this section, the term "tax liability" refers to any liability for a tax under any Federal, State, or local law, or the law of any foreign jurisdiction, including any statute, rule, regulation, or ordinance that levies, imposes, or assesses such tax liability.

Subsection (c) of section 14 provides (in part):

This section does not apply to that part of an invention that [...] is a method, apparatus, technology, computer program product, or system, that is used solely for preparing a tax or information return or other tax filing, including one that records, transmits, transfers, or organizes data related to such filing...

Subsection (e) of section 14 of the Act provides that the tax patent prohibition takes effect on the date of the enactment (September 16, 2011) and that it will apply "to any patent application that is pending on, or filed on or after, that date, and to any patent that is issued on or after that date."
