= Carolyn Chiechi =

American judge (born 1943)

Senior Judge of the United States Tax Court
- In office September 30, 2007 – October 19, 2018

Judge of the United States Tax Court
- In office October 1, 1992 – September 30, 2007
- Appointed by: George H. W. Bush
- Preceded by: Arthur Nims
- Succeeded by: David Gustafson

Personal details
- Born: Carolyn Schapp; December 6, 1943 (age 82) Newark, New Jersey, U.S.
- Education: Georgetown University (BS, JD, LLM)

Carolyn P. Chiechi (born December 6, 1943) is a retired judge of the United States Tax Court.

Chiechi graduated first in her class from Georgetown University in 1965, and earned a J.D. in 1969, an LL.M. in Taxation in 1971, and a Doctor of Laws, Honoris Causa, in 2000. After completing her LL.M., she served as an advisor to Judge Leo H. Irwin of the United States Tax Court from 1969-71. She then engaged in private practice with Sutherland Asbill & Brennan from 1971 to 1992, making partner in 1976. On October 1, 1992, Chiechi was appointed by President George H. W. Bush as Judge, United States Tax Court, for a term ending September 30, 2007. She retired on September 30, 2007, but continued to perform judicial duties as Senior Judge on recall until October 19, 2018.

== Activities and honoraria ==
- District of Columbia Bar: Member, 1969–Present; Member, Taxation Section, 1973–99; Member, Taxation Section Steering Committee, 1980–82, Chairperson, 1981–82; Member, Tax Audits and Litigation Committee, 1986–92, Chairperson, 1987–88.
- American Bar Association: Member, 1969–Present; Member, Section of Taxation, 1969–Present; Member, Committee on Court Procedure, 1991–Present; Member, Litigation Section, 1995–2000; Member, Judicial Division, 1997-2000.
- Federal Bar Association: Member, 1969–Present; Member, Section of Taxation, 1969–Present; Member, Judiciary Division, 1992–Present.
- Women's Bar Association of the District of Columbia: Member, 1992–Present.
- Fellow, American College of Tax Counsel.
- Fellow, American Bar Foundation.
- Member, Board of Governors, Georgetown University Alumni Association, 1994–97, 1997-2000.
- Member, Board of Regents, Georgetown University, 1988–94; 1995-2001.
- Member, National Law Alumni Board, Georgetown University, 1986-93.
- Member, Board of Directors, Stuart Stiller Memorial Foundation, 1986-99.
- Member, American Judicature Society, 1994–Present.
- One of several recipients of the first Georgetown University Law Alumni Awards (1994). One of several recipients of the first Georgetown University Law Center Alumnae Achievement Awards (1998).
- Admitted to Who's Who in American Law, Who's Who of American Women, and Who's Who in America.

== Attribution ==
Material on this page was copied from the website of the United States Tax Court, which is published by a United States government agency, and is therefore in the public domain.

Legal offices
Preceded by Arthur Nims	Judge of the United States Tax Court; 1992–2007	Succeeded by David Gustafson
