= David Gustafson =

American judge (born 1956)

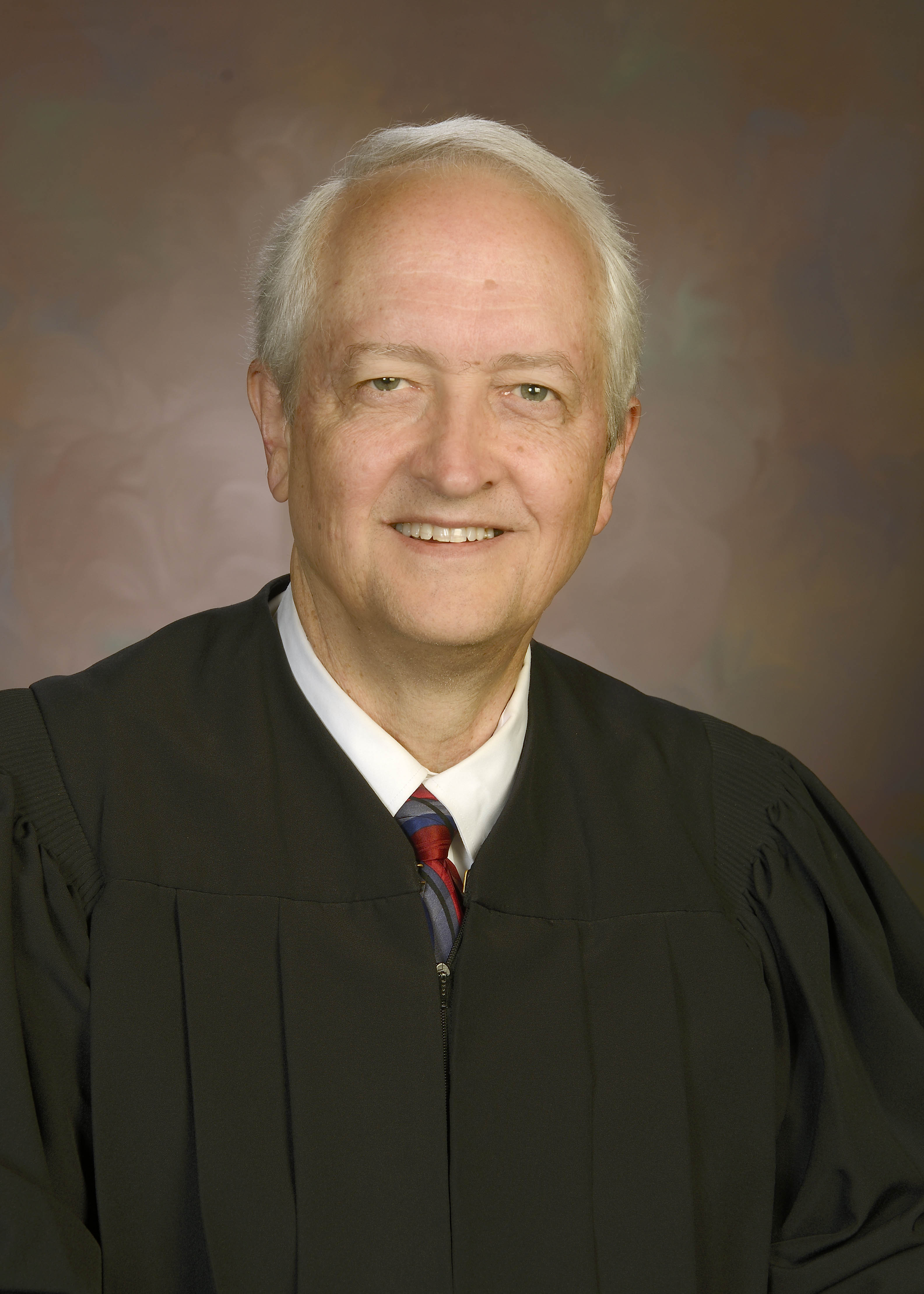
- Judge David Gustafson, 2022

Senior Judge of the United States Tax Court
- Incumbent
- Assumed office November 1, 2022

Judge of the United States Tax Court
- In office July 29, 2008 – November 1, 2022
- Appointed by: George W. Bush
- Preceded by: Carolyn Chiechi
- Succeeded by: Adam B. Landy

Personal details
- Born: David Douglas Gustafson; October 13, 1956 (age 68); Greenville, South Carolina, U.S.
- Relatives: Dwight Gustafson (father)
- Education: Bob Jones University (BA); Duke University (JD)

David Douglas Gustafson (born October 13, 1956) is a senior judge of the United States Tax Court.

== Biography ==
Gustafson was born on October 13, 1956, in Greenville, South Carolina. He graduated summa cum laude from Bob Jones University in 1978, and with distinction from the Duke University School of Law in 1981, where he was a member of the Order of the Coif and executive editor of the Duke Law Journal (1980–1981). Gustafson was admitted to the District of Columbia Bar in 1981 and served as an associate at the law firm of Sutherland, Asbill and Brennan, in Washington, D.C., 1981–1983. He was a trial attorney (1983–1989), Assistant Chief (1989–2005), and Chief (2005–2008) in the Court of Federal Claims Section of the Tax Division in the U.S. Department of Justice; and Coordinator of Tax Shelter Litigation for the entire Tax Division (2002–2006). He won Tax Division Outstanding Attorney Awards in 1985, 1989, 1997, 2001–2005, and the Federal Bar Association's Younger Attorney Award, 1991. He was elected president of the Court of Federal Claims Bar Association (2001). He was appointed by President George W. Bush to be a judge of the United States Tax Court on July 29, 2008, for a term ending July 29, 2023. He assumed senior status on November 1, 2022.

== Personal life ==
Gustafson married Sharon Elizabeth Fast in 1980 and they have nine children. Gustafson's father was the late composer Dwight Gustafson. Sharon Fast Gustafson served as the General counsel of the Equal Employment Opportunity Commission until March 2021.

Legal offices
Preceded by Carolyn Chiechi	Judge of the United States Tax Court; 2008–2022	Succeeded by Adam B. Landy
