= Adam B. Landy =

American judge (born 1982)

Adam Landy
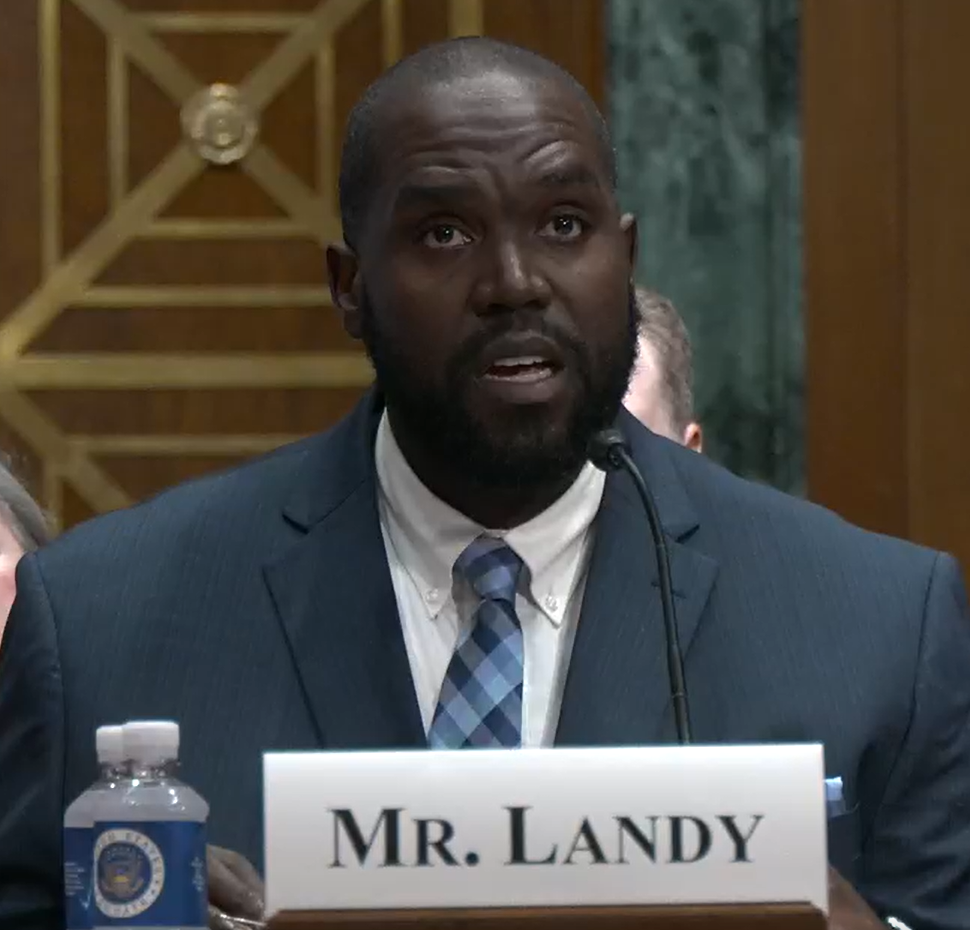

Judge of the United States Tax Court
- Incumbent
- Assumed office August 8, 2024
- Appointed by: Joe Biden
- Preceded by: David Gustafson

Personal details
- Born: Adam Brooks Landy; 1982 (age 43–44)
- Education: University of South Carolina (BS, MS, JD); Northwestern University (LLM)

Adam B. Landy (born 1982) is an American lawyer has served as a judge of the United States Tax Court since 2024. From 2021 to 2024, he served as a special trial judge of the same court.

== Education ==
Landy earned a Bachelor of Science in 2004, a Master of Science in 2006, both from the University of South Carolina and a Juris Doctor from the University of South Carolina School of Law in 2009. He earned a Master of Laws from the Northwestern University Pritzker School of Law in 2010.

== Career ==
Landy briefly served as a law clerk for Judge J. Michelle Childs on the Richland County Circuit Court during the summer of 2008. From 2010 to 2016, he was an associate at McNair Law Firm, P.A., which later merged into Burr Forman, LLP. From 2016 to 2021, he was a senior attorney with the IRS Office of Chief Counsel in Baltimore, Maryland and San Francisco, California. He was appointed as a special trial judge of the United States Tax Court on December 6, 2021.

=== United States Tax Court service ===
On February 1, 2024, President Joe Biden nominated Landy to the United States Tax Court. He was nominated the seat vacated by Judge David Gustafson, who assumed senior status on November 1, 2022. On June 4, 2024, a hearing on his nomination was held before the Senate Finance Committee. On June 13, 2024, his nomination was reported out of committee by a 26–1 vote. On July 24, 2024, the United States Senate invoked cloture on his nomination by a 85–12 vote. On July 29, 2024, his nomination was confirmed by a 73–13 vote. He was sworn into office on August 8, 2024.

== See also ==
- List of African American jurists
- List of African American federal judges

Legal offices
| Preceded by David Gustafson | Judge of the United States Tax Court; 2024–present | Incumbent |
