= No tax on tips =

American political proposal

No tax on tips is an American proposal to not tax income earned from tips. During the 2024 United States presidential election, both main candidates supported legislation to remove federal taxes from tips.

On May 20, 2025, the United States Senate passed the bipartisan No Tax on Tips Act proposed bill by unanimous consent. A version of the bill was included in the One Big Beautiful Bill Act and signed into law on July 4, 2025. The bill sets an expiration date for the tax credit on December 31, 2028.

== Support ==
At the federal level, several bills have been proposed to reduce or eliminate taxes on tips. The proposal is also being considered in at least 20 states.

President Trump mentions 'No tax on tips' at Machine Shed restaurant in Iowa in 2026

The proposal was supported by both Donald Trump and Kamala Harris in the 2024 United States presidential election. The National Restaurant Association has also expressed support for the proposal.

== Criticism ==
The proposal gives priority to tipped workers and leaves out the vast majority of Americans who are not in tipped occupations.

Some tipped workers have incomes so low that they do not owe federal income tax. If customers perceive workers take home a greater share of their tips, they could tip less.

The focus on taxes on tips could also distract from raising the tipped and untipped minimum wages and reduce pressure on employers to raise wages.

The proposal could lead more industries to rely more on tipping which is widely unpopular.

The proposal could also enable tax avoidance as income is represented as tips such as bonuses or commissions earned by hedge fund managers.

If the proposal only covered federal income tax, it would not affect many low-wage workers that pay more in payroll tax than in income tax. By contrast, if the proposal included payroll taxes, workers could lose access to Social Security and Medicare benefits. Tips could also be excluded from wages, resulting in workers receiving reduced unemployment benefits. Reduced taxes would also lead to a loss of tax revenue.

== See also ==
- Earned income tax credit
- United States federal child tax credit
- One Fair Wage
