= Qualified Small Business Stock =

United States Tax Incentive

Qualified Small Business Stock (QSBS) is a tax incentive to drive the investment and founding of small businesses in the United States of America. The QSBS regulations are under U.S. Code Section 1202 of the Internal Revenue Code (IRC). QSBS is a tax exemption on a federal, and in some cases, a state level. The tax benefit can exclude up to 100% of capital gains on the sale of QSBS held for five years. The tax exemption allows for the exclusion from taxable income of capital gains up to the greater of $10 million or 10 times the shareholder's basis in their stock (i.e., initial investment in the company).

== History of QSBS ==
QSBS was first enacted in August 1993. Expansion and modification of these original aspects of QSBS legislations have occurred over the years to further motivate taxpayers to invest in, or even create, certain types of small businesses to boost job creation and to prevent economic recession.

Over the decades, several legislative events have contributed to investor interest in the QSBS Section 1202 capital gains tax exclusion:

=== 1993 – P.L 103-66 Section 1202 Passed ===
August 10, 1993, the Public Law No. 103-66 Title VIII Part II Subpart B – Capital Gains Provision was passed by the House of Representatives Budget Committee and added to the Internal Revenue Code (IRC) as Section 1202.4. It was introduced by Martin Olav Sabo of the Minnesota House of Representatives. Section 1202 provided investors a 50% tax exclusion on capital gains up to the greater of $10M or 10x the taxpayer's basis. The capital gains rate was 28% at the time, and therefore QSBS provided up to a 14% tax savings.

=== 1998 – Congress Lowered the Top Capital Gains Rate ===
The capital gains rate was lowered to 20% for non-QSBS but kept at 28% for QSBS, which lowered the tax savings to 6%. 2003 – Congress Lowered the Top Capital Gains Rate The capital gains rate was lowered to 15% for non-QSBS but kept at 28% with a 50% exclusion for QSBS, which lowered the tax savings to 1%.

=== 2009 – Congress Increased the Section 1202 Exclusion ===
The 50% tax exclusion on QSBS was increased to 75%, which raised the tax savings from 1% to 8%. 2010 – Congress Temporarily Increased the Section 1202 Exclusion The 75% tax exclusion on QSBS was increased to 100%, which raised the tax savings from 8% to 15%.

=== 2015 – PATH ACT 2015 ===
Congress passed the Protecting Americans from Tax Hikes Act (PATH), which permanently increased the Section 1202 tax exclusion to 100% if the original issuance of the stock was made after September 27, 2010.

=== 2017 – Tax Cuts and Jobs Act (TCJA) ===
The TCJA was signed and enacted, which reduced the corporate tax rate from 35% to 21%, encouraging more companies to choose to be taxed as C-corporations and potentially benefit from the QSBS tax exemptions.

=== 2025 - One Big Beautiful Bill Act (OBBBA) ===
The OBBBA changed the requirement to hold the stock for at least five years. For qualified small business stock acquired after July 4, 2025, a 50% exclusion is available for stock held at least three years, a 75% exclusion is available for stock held for at least four years, and a 100% continues to be available for stock held for at least five years.

The OBBBA also increased the exclusion's limit to $15 million or 10 times the taxpayer's basis in the stock, which ever was greater. The $15-million limit will be subject to annual inflation adjustments in 2027 and thereafter.

In addition, the OBBBA now allows the issuing corporation to have an aggregate gross asset limitation of up to $75 million for stock issued after July 4, 2025. The $75-million limit will be subject to annual inflation adjustments in 2027 and thereafter.

== Eligibility, Recording, and Filing Qualified Small Business Stock (QSBS) ==
QSBS eligibility and tax exemption benefits aim to fuel job growth on a national level by incentivizing investments in C-corporations located in the United States. However, QSBS eligibility excludes companies where individuals or groups of employees are considered the "product," such as healthcare workers, accountants, or lawyers. Additionally, specific requirements must be met at the corporate level, security level, and individual taxpayer level for a company or investor to qualify and remain QSBS eligible. Some of these requirements are at issuance of the stock, and others are during the shareholder's holding period.

=== General criteria for QSBS Eligible Stock ===
- The company must be a domestic C-Corporation.
- The company must have had less than $50 million in aggregate gross assets at the time the stock was issued or up to $75 million for stock issued after July 4, 2025. The $75-million limit will be subject to annual inflation adjustments in 2027 and thereafter.
- The company must be an "active business" in a qualified trade for substantially all of the holder's holding period.
- The stock from a qualified company must be directly issued by the company and must be held for a minimum of 5 years. For qualified small business stock acquired after July 4, 2025, a 50% exclusion is available for stock held at least three years, a 75% exclusion is available for stock held for at least four years, and a 100% continues to be available for stock held for at least five years.
- A qualified trade or business is any trade or business other than those involving certain personal services (e.g., health, law, engineering, architecture, accounting, actuarial science, performing arts, consulting, athletics, financial services, brokerage services), banking, insurance, financing, leasing, investing, or similar activities, farming, natural resource extraction, and businesses operating hotels, motels, restaurants, or similar businesses.
- The stock must have been issued after August 10, 1993. For the 100% gain exclusion, the stock must have been acquired after September 27, 2010.

== QSBS Rules by State ==
On a national level, each state has a specific treatment of QSBS gains at the state income tax level. There are three ways states typically address the exclusion:

Some states fully conform to the Federal QSBS guidelines and allow full exemption if the stock meets the Section 1202 QSBS criteria. These states conform to the federal tax code on either a "static" or "rolling" basis. "Static" conformity means the state starts complying with the Internal Revenue Code as of a specific date. "Rolling" conformity means that the state adopts IRC changes as they occur.

Some states partially conform to the Federal QSBS guidelines, whereby the capital gains from QSBS are exempt if additional criteria beyond the Federal guidelines are met, such as only allowing exemptions if the QSBS gains were from a company doing business in that state.

Certain states do not have state income taxes, and therefore there is no QSBS implication at the state level. Additionally, select states do not allow any capital gains exclusions for QSBS.

States that Conform to Federal QSBS (IRC Section 1202)

- Arkansas
- Arizona
- Colorado
- Connecticut
- Delaware
- Georgia
- Idaho
- Illinois
- Indiana
- Iowa
- Kansas
- Kentucky
- Louisiana
- Maine
- Maryland
- Michigan
- Minnesota
- Missouri
- Montana
- Nebraska
- New Mexico
- New York
- North Carolina
- North Dakota
- Ohio
- Oklahoma
- Oregon
- Rhode Island
- South Carolina
- Utah
- Vermont
- Virginia
- West Virginia
- Wisconsin

States that do not conform to Federal QSBS (IRC Section 1202)

- Alabama
- California
- Mississippi
- New Jersey
- Pennsylvania
- Puerto Rico

States that Partially Conform to Federal QSBS (IRC Section 1202)

- Hawaii
- Massachusetts

States Without State Income Tax (conform with IRC Section 1202)

- Alaska
- Florida
- Nevada
- South Dakota
- Texas
- Washington
- Wyoming

States Without State Capital Gains Tax (conform with IRC Section 1202)

- New Hampshire
- Tennessee

== Criticisms of QSBS ==
Due to practices that multiply the tax benefit, there are some criticisms over the uses of the QSBS tax exemption. Majority of these practices being used to multiply the tax benefit are not initially intended within the tax code. Originally, the enactment of the QSBS tax exemption legislation worked to incentivize investments in certain types of small businesses within the United States. However, as the popularity of the tax benefit began to grow, some investors found ways to make the most of the tax benefit by multiplying their personal tax savings and, in some cases, to family, friends, and acquaintances.
