= Onesource State Apportionment =

ONESOURCE State Apportionment
- Industry: software
- Parent: Thomson Reuters

ONESOURCE State Apportionment (formerly Liquid Engines) is software that helps corporations manage their state and international taxes.

== Patent controversy ==
Liquid Engines has filed a number of patent applications that are considered to be tax patents. These types of patents are controversial and legislation has been introduced into the United States Congress to ban them. Thus both Liquid Engines and one of its founders, Edward Lazear, have come under criticism by organizations that are opposed to tax patents. Edward Lazear was President George W. Bush's chief economic adviser and signed over all of his ownership rights to the patent application to Liquid Engines in part to avoid a conflict of interest.

== Acquisition ==
In August 2008, Liquid Engines, headquartered in Sunnyvale, California, was acquired and dissolved into the Tax & Accounting division of Thomson Reuters. Liquid Engines was renamed ONESOURCE State Apportionment inn 2012.
