= Grantor retained annuity trust =

US financial instrument

A grantor-retained annuity trust (commonly referred to by the acronym GRAT) is a financial instrument commonly used in the United States to make large financial gifts to family members without paying a gift tax.

== Basic mechanism ==
A grantor transfers property into an irrevocable trust in exchange for the right to receive fixed payments at least annually, based on the original fair market value of the property transferred. At the end of a specified time, any remaining value in the trust is passed on to a beneficiary of the trust as a gift. Beneficiaries are generally close family members of the grantor, such as children or grandchildren, who are prohibited from being named beneficiaries of another estate freeze technique, the grantor-retained income trust. If a grantor dies before the trust period ends, the assets in the GRAT are included in the grantor's estate, eliminating any potential gift tax benefit; this is the GRAT's main weakness as a tax avoidance mechanism.

The United States Internal Revenue Service has a number of regulations governing how the remaining value of the trust at the end of the term (or at the death of the grantor) is taxed. When the GRAT is first set up, a "gift value" of the GRAT is calculated. The gift value is set equal to the initial contribution to the GRAT plus the theoretical interest earned on the principal, minus the annuity payments that would be made through the end of the term. The theoretical rate of interest is determined by IRS regulations. The rate is set equal to 120% of the federal mid-term rate during the month that the GRAT is established.

To realize a tax benefit, the sum of the scheduled annuity payments of a GRAT is set to be about equal to the principal plus theoretical interest. Thus, for tax purposes, the initially calculated gift value is zero, since what will be paid back to the donor in annuity payments is anticipated to be about equal to what the donor invested, plus interest. If a GRAT is funded with highly volatile assets, it is possible that the actual interest earned on the assets will be substantially higher than the IRS theoretical interest. Thus at the end of the term, the value remaining in the GRAT may still be large, even though the initial IRS calculation suggests that it should have been zero. This remaining value is then passed on to the beneficiary without incurring a gift tax.

== Important legal cases ==
- Audrey J. Walton v. Commissioner, 115 T.C. 589 (2000), acq. Notice 2003-72, 2003-44 IRB, 15 October 2003. This case established the current way that the IRS established a gift value for a GRAT.

== Patents ==
The Wealth Transfer Group owns a patent covering different methods for managing SOGRATs. A SOGRAT is a GRAT that is at least partially funded with stock options. The patent number is U.S. patent 6,567,790, and is entitled "Establishing and managing grantor retained annuity trusts funded by nonqualified stock options". On 12 January 2011, the director of the USPTO initiated a reexamination of US patent 6,567,790.

== Controversies ==
A ProPublica report detailed how several ultra-wealthy families exploited the GRAT to avoided potentially billions in estate taxes.

Grantor-retained annuity trusts were used by controversial sex offender Jeffrey Epstein to help his wealthy clients avoid taxes.

== See also ==
- Trust law
