= Arthur Nims =

American judge (1923–2019)

Arthur Lee Nims III (January 3, 1923 – September 15, 2019) was an American federal judge who served on the United States Tax Court.

== Biography ==
Nims was born in Oklahoma in 1923. After attending public schools in Macon, Georgia, and then Deerfield Academy in Deerfield, Massachusetts, Nims earned a B.A., Williams College, and LL.B. at the University of Georgia Law School, and am LL.M. in Taxation at the New York University Law School. His legal pursuits were interrupted by his service as an officer, Lieutenant (jg.), U.S. Naval Reserve, on active duty in the Pacific Theater during World War II, but he was admitted to the Georgia Bar in 1949. He then entered private practice in Macon until 1951, then worked for the Internal Revenue Service in New York City until 1954, and in Washington D.C. from 1954 to 1955. Nims returned to private practice in Newark, New Jersey, becoming a partner in the law firm of McCarter and English from 1961 to 1979; serving at the same time as Secretary in the Section of Taxation, American Bar Association, 1977–79; chairman, Section of Taxation, New Jersey State Bar Association, 1969–71; and as a member of the American Law Institute

Nims was appointed by President Jimmy Carter as Judge, United States Tax Court, on June 29, 1979, for a term ending June 28, 1994. He served as Chief Judge of the Tax Court from June 1, 1988, to May 31, 1992, and retired on June 1, 1992, but was recalled as Senior Judge to perform judicial duties. He died on September 15, 2019, aged 96.

== Trivia ==
- Member of the American College of Tax Counsel
- Received the Kellogg Award for Lifetime Achievement from Williams College
- Received Tax Society of New York University Award for lifetime achievement.

== Attribution ==
Material on this page was copied from the website of the United States Tax Court, which is published by a United States government agency, and is therefore in the public domain.
