= Duty (tax) =

Tax on certain goods and transactions

In economics, a duty is a target-specific form of tax levied by a state or other political entity. It is often associated with customs, in which context they are also known as tariffs or dues. The term is often used to describe a tax on certain items purchased abroad.

A duty is levied on specific commodities, financial transactions, estates, etc. rather than being a direct imposition on individuals or corporations such income or property taxes. Examples include customs duty, excise duty, stamp duty, estate duty, and gift duty.

== Customs duty ==
A customs duty or due is the indirect tax levied on the import or export of goods in international trade. In economics a duty is also a kind of consumption tax. A duty levied on goods being imported is referred to as an 'import duty', and one levied on exports an 'export duty'.

== Estate duty ==
An estate duty (in the U.S. inheritance tax) is a tax levied on the estate of a deceased person in many jurisdictions or on the inheritance of a person. The tax is sometimes referred to, formally or informally, as a death duty.

== Gift duty ==
A gift tax on value given from one taxable entity to another.

== See also ==
- Free economic zone
- Duty-free shop
- Smuggling
- Tax evasion
- Likin (taxation), tax collected on transportation of goods in Qing China
