= Gift tax =

Tax on money or property that one living person gives to another

In economics, a gift tax is the tax on money or property that one living person or corporate entity gives to another. A gift tax is a type of transfer tax that is imposed when someone gives something of value to someone else. The transfer must be gratuitous or the receiving party must pay a lesser amount than the item's full value to be considered a gift. Items received upon the death of another are considered separately under the inheritance tax. Many gifts are not subject to taxation because of exemptions given in tax laws. The gift tax amount varies by jurisdiction, and international comparison of rates is complex and fluid.

The process of transferring assets and wealth to the upcoming generations is known as estate planning. It involves planning for transfers at death or during life. One such instrument is the right to transfer assets to another person known as gift-giving, or with the goal of reducing one's taxable wealth when the donor still lives. For fulfilling the criteria of a gift, the person who receives the gift cannot pay the giver the full value for that gift, but they may pay an amount less than the full value of the gift. In the situation where all exclusions, thresholds, and exemptions have been met, these kinds of transfers are subject to a gift tax.

There are some criteria for a valid gift to be satisfied: the intention of the donor should be to voluntarily transfer and he is also competent to do so. On the receiver side, the donee should be able to receive and take delivery, and the person who provides the gift would be ready to give up all the control over the given property.

== Types ==
Once a transfer to be labeled as a gift is determined, the next part is to determine if the gift tax will apply to that transfer. There are several types of gifts. To differentiate between complete and incomplete gift, the example of trust can be important as in the incomplete form, the donor retains control over a gift in terms of placing the money into a revocable trust and as such, keep the right to control the final disposition of what is in that trust, while in the case of an irrevocable trust, they make a complete gift by giving up control completely. In a direct case, the gift is directly transferred to the recipient for example in terms of property or payment. In an indirect case, a transfer on behalf of someone for someone's benefit is taking place like payment of loan or credit on behalf of relatives. In the case of a net gift, the recipient is responsible for the gift tax, while in most other cases the donor is responsible. Revisionary interest gift can be explained in a way where transfers are done to the recipient which will revert to the donor. The donor places money in a trust for a time period for the benefit of the recipient. The donor will be reverted the money at the end of the term. The present value is the worth to the recipient rather than fair market value. The value of the gift in this instance is less than the value of the property.

== Valuation ==
There are several ways for the valuation of gift tax. For a bond, it would be the present value of its future payments. The average of the low and high share price for the day on which gift transfer has taken place is the value of publicly traded shares. For privately held shares the opinion of a qualified valuation specialist would be required while taking into account the potential restrictions on control, liquidity, and marketability. The United States Treasury has issued guidelines for certain property types. It would make more sense to the donor to gift appreciated assets since they would remove a larger sum from their estate. The totality of one's tax planning and consulting professional is to be considered. It is however to be considered that fair market value on the date of its transfer is taken into consideration for gift tax purposes. An appraisal is needed for real estate and collectibles.

== Exemptions ==
There are exemptions from having to pay gift tax. For example, gifts up to a certain value per year per recipient are subject to the annual exclusion. In the United States for example the amount is $15,000. Not eligible for the annual exclusion are the gifts that allow the recipient unrestrained access only at a later date or a future interest and these are fully taxable. There is a technique known as Crummey power that enables a gift that is not eligible for a tax exclusion and enables individuals to receive it as the gift that is tax eligible. It is applied by Individuals often to contributions in an irrevocable trust. In order for it to work, an individual must specify that the gift amount does not exceed $15,000 annually, per beneficiary and is part of the trust when it is drafted.

Payments as a means for support can be exempt from gift tax in the case of payments for room and board or higher education that is a legal obligation for children or other dependents. Payments made directly to a qualified medical care provider or academic institution on behalf of the donee are exempt from any gift tax as qualified transfers. Gifts and transfers made to political organizations are also exempt. These are defined as those advocating the nomination, selection, or appointment of any individual to state, federal, or local public office. Typically deemed compensation are transfers in a business setting. Gifts like those to commemorate one's retirement of service or reward years of service are not subject to the gift tax. Transfers between spouses are exempt from gift tax in the US if the donee spouse is a U.S. citizen. Otherwise, there is a limit on the tax-exempt transfer.

Gifts for use by the political organization to these organizations are excluded. And as long as the recipient is a state, federal or local government for public use, fraternal or veterans organization, corporation for educational, charitable or scientific, or religious purposes. Educational and medical expenses payments made by a donor to a person or an organization, such as a doctor, a college, or a hospital are also excluded.

When determining if one owes gift tax, it is necessary to determine what gifts were given for the year, whether or not the gifts are exempt from gift tax or fall into exception categories of the annual exclusion amount, and to what degree they may be offset by the unified credit amount for the given year. Above all, a tax professional should be consulted when undertaking tax planning decisions. A gift tax return should be filed if the gifts transferred are of future interest or exceed the annual exclusion, or exceed the unified credit amount.

== Gift tax by country ==
=== Countries without gift tax ===
- Argentina
- Australia
- Austria
- Canada
- Cyprus
- New Zealand
- Liechtenstein
- Malta
- Norway
- Romania
- Slovakia
- Sweden
- United Kingdom

=== Countries with gift tax ===
- Belgium
- Chile
- Czech Republic
- Denmark
- Finland
- France
- Germany
- India
- Ireland
- Italy
- Japan
- Netherlands
- Philippines
- Portugal
- Poland
- Slovenia
- Spain
- South Africa
- South Korea
- Switzerland
- United States

=== Gift tax rates in the world ===
The table contains only information on countries that publicly provided information on gift tax.

Country	Gift Tax Rate
Algeria	5%
Angola	When transmission occurs between spouses or in favor of descendants and ascendants, the rate is 15%; when transmission occurs between other people, the rate is 30%.
Azerbaijan	Exempted if received by immediate family members; otherwise, 25%.
Belgium	Gift tax rates differ depending on the area where the gift is registered and range from 3% to 7%.
Botswana	12.5%
Chile	25%
Colombia	10%
Croatia	4%
Czech Republic	If the gift is taxable, the usual PIT rate applies.
Denmark	15%
Dominican Republic	27%
Ecuador	35%
Equatorial Guinea	5%
Finland	The tax rate is determined by the gift's worth as well as the relationship between the donee and the donor.
France	60%
Germany	7% to 50%, depending on the degree of relationship (defines tax class and tax-exempted amount) and the amount of money gifted.
Ghana	The gift is included in the individual's income and is taxed at a rate of 25% for non-residents and the marginal rate for residents; or 15% for residents (upon election and the gift does not relate to business or employment).
Greece	Category A: 10%; Category B: 20%; Category C: 40%
Hungary	18%
Iceland	Gifts are subject to ordinary income taxation.
Ireland	33%
India	Income tax rates
Italy	8%
Japan	55%
Kosovo	Taxable as ordinary income
Lebanon	45%
Mexico	Taxable to the recipient as ordinary income
Netherlands	40%
Nicaragua	15%
Philippines	6%
Portugal	Land donations are taxed at 0.8% under the stamp tax, while free purchase of products by persons (inheritance and gifts) is taxed at 10% under the stamp tax.
Slovenia	The tax rate varies depending on the sum and line of succession and can vary from 0% to 40%.
Spain	34%
South Africa	25%
South Korea	50%
Switzerland	Federal: Exempt. Spouse: Exempt. Direct descendants: Exempt in most cantons. Others: Varies per canton.
Thailand	5%
Turkey	30%
United Kingdom	The United Kingdom does not have gift tax, but it does have inheritance tax, including on gifts made up to 7 years before death.
United States	0 - 40%
Vietnam	10%
