= Goff (disambiguation) =

Goff is a surname. See the article for a list of people with the surname.

Goff may also refer to:

== First name ==
- Goff Letts, politician in Northern Territory, Australia
- Goff Richards, English brass band arranger and composer

== Places ==
- Goff, Kansas, small city in the United States
- Goff Farm, Massachusetts, United States
- Goff Homestead, Massachusetts, United States
- Goff Petroglyph Site, Arkansas, United States

== Other uses ==
- GOFF, a file format
- Goff, a name for the area behind the longwall in a longwall mine

== See also ==
- Le Goff, a surname
- Goffs (disambiguation)
- Goffe
- Gough (disambiguation)
- Goff's Caye, an island of Belize
