= Goff House =

Goff House, Goff Farm, or Goff Barn may refer to:

- Solomon Goffe House, Meriden, Connecticut
- Hugh and Susie Goff House, Jerome, Idaho
- Strauder Goff House, Winchester, Kentucky, listed on the National Register of Historic Places (NRHP)
- Goff-Baskett House, Brandenburg, Kentucky, listed on the NRHP
- Goff Farm, Rehoboth, Massachusetts
- Goff Homestead, Rehoboth, Massachusetts
- Goff House (Hamilton, Montana)
- William I. and Magdalen M. Goff House, El Reno, Oklahoma
- Pitcher-Goff House, Pawtucket, Rhode Island
- J. Whitney Goff Round Barn, Winfred, South Dakota
- Stealey-Goff-Vance House, Clarksburg, West Virginia
