= Goffe =

Goffe is primarily an English surname, with origins potentially stemming from a nickname for a red-haired person (from Welsh/Cornish "coch"), an occupational name for a blacksmith (from Breton/Celtic "gof"), or a short form of the French name Geoffrey, all appearing in medieval records. It is a variant of Goff, with historical presence in the UK, US, and Scotland, and early records in places like East Anglia. It may refer to:

- Alan Powell Goffe (1920–1966), British pathologist
- Alfred Constantine Goffe (1863–1951), Jamaican businessman
- Christopher Goffe (fl. 1683–1691), pirate and privateer active in the Red Sea and the Caribbean
- John Goffe (1701–1786), Colonial American soldier
- Lloyd Goffe (1913–1984), British motorcycle speedway rider
- Rusty Goffe (born 1948), British dwarf entertainer
- Stephen Goffe (1605–1681), Royalist agent of the Wars of the Three Kingdoms
- Sue Goffe, English film maker
- Thomas Goffe (1591–1629), Jacobean dramatist
- William Goffe (c. 1615 – c. 1679), English regicide

== See also ==
- Goffstown, New Hampshire, named after John Goffe
- Goff
- Gough
