= Goffs =

Goffs may refer to:

== Places ==
- Goffs, California, settlement in at southeast edge of Mojave National Preserve
- Goffs, West Virginia, an unincorporated community
- Goffs, Nova Scotia, rural community in Canada

== Other ==
- Goffs School; comprehensive secondary school and sixth form college in Cheshunt, Hertfordshire, United Kingdom

== See also ==
- Goff (disambiguation)
- Goffs Oak, village in Hertfordshire, United Kingdom
- Goff's Caye, island of Belize
