= Laurence Whalen =

American judge (born 1944)

Senior Judge of the United States Tax Court
- In office November 22, 2002 – 2018

Judge of the United States Tax Court
- In office November 23, 1987 – November 22, 2002
- Appointed by: Ronald Reagan
- Preceded by: William A. Goff
- Succeeded by: Robert Wherry

Personal details
- Born: Laurence John Whalen; December 9, 1944 (age 80); Philadelphia, Pennsylvania, U.S.
- Education: Georgetown University (BA, JD)

Laurence John Whalen (born December 9, 1944) is a retired senior judge of the United States Tax Court.

He was born in Philadelphia, Pennsylvania, and earned his A.B. from Georgetown University, 1967; J.D., Georgetown University Law Center, 1970, followed by an LL.M. in 1971. He has been admitted to the District of Columbia and Oklahoma Bars. Special Assistant to the Assistant Attorney General, Tax Division, Department of Justice, 1971–72; trial attorney, Tax Division, 1971–75. Private law practice in Washington, D.C., with Hamel and Park (now Hopkins, Sutter, Hamel and Park), 1977–84; also in Oklahoma City, Oklahoma, with Crowe & Dunlevy, 1984–87. He is a member of the Oklahoma Bar Association, District of Columbia Bar Association, and American Bar Association.

Whalen was appointed by President Reagan as Judge, United States Tax Court, on November 23, 1987, for a term ending November 22, 2002. Retired on November 23, 2002, but continues to perform judicial duties as Senior Judge on recall.

Legal offices
Preceded by William A. Goff	Judge of the United States Tax Court; 1987–2002	Succeeded by Robert Wherry
