= 2018 Los Angeles Rams season =

82nd season in franchise history, 4th Super Bowl loss

- Owner: Stan Kroenke
- General manager: Les Snead
- Head coach: Sean McVay
- Offensive coordinator: Sean McVay (de facto)
- Defensive coordinator: Wade Phillips
- Home stadium: Los Angeles Memorial Coliseum

Results
- Record: 13–3
- Division place: 1st NFC West
- Playoffs: Won Divisional Playoffs (vs. Cowboys) 30–22; Won NFC Championship (at Saints) 26–23 (OT); Lost Super Bowl LIII (vs. Patriots) 3–13
- All-Pros: 4: RB Todd Gurley (1st team); DT Aaron Donald (1st team); P Johnny Hekker (2nd team); ST Cory Littleton (2nd team)
- Pro Bowlers: 4: Selected but did not play due to participation in Super Bowl LIII: QB Jared Goff; RB Todd Gurley; DT Aaron Donald; ST Cory Littleton

Uniform
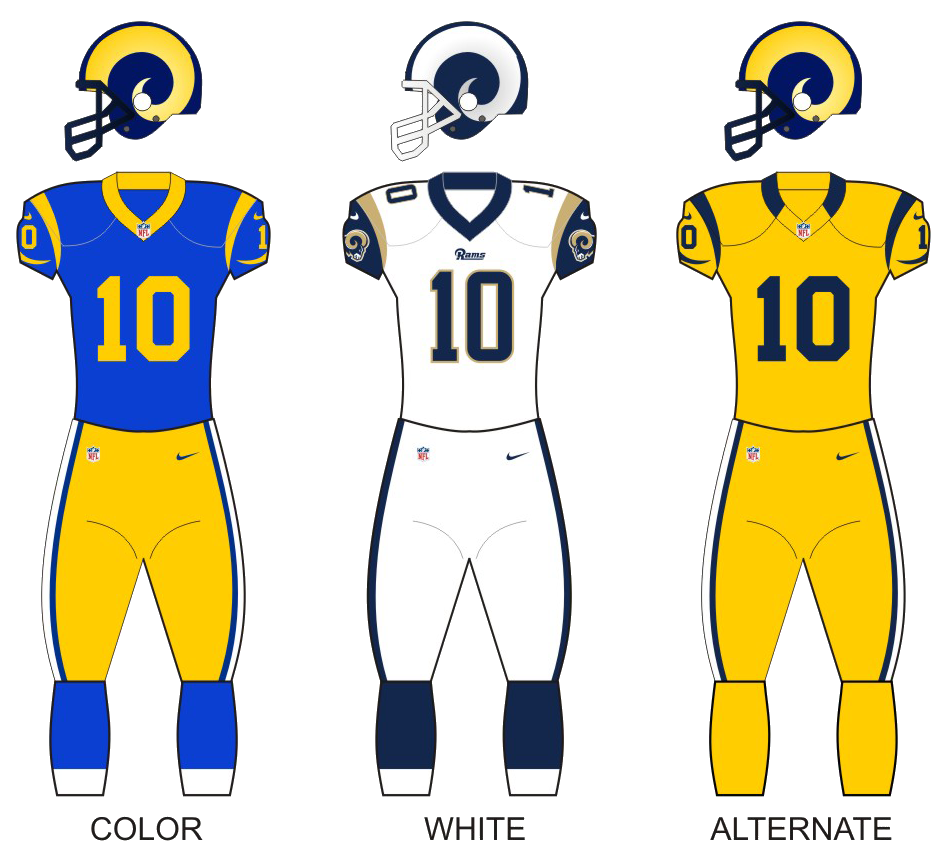

The 2018 season was the Los Angeles Rams' 81st in the National Football League (NFL), their 82nd overall, their 52nd in the Greater Los Angeles Area and their second under head coach Sean McVay.

The Rams finished with a record of 13–3, improving on their 11–5 record from the 2017 season. The team won its first eight games of the season (its best start since 1969) before losing to the former division rival Saints in Week 9. After defeating the Kansas City Chiefs 54–51 in Week 11, the third highest-scoring game in NFL history, and a 30–16 victory over the Detroit Lions in Week 13, the Rams clinched the NFC West for the second consecutive year, giving Los Angeles its first back-to-back division titles since 1978 and 1979 and consecutive playoff berths for the first time since the 2003 and 2004, when the franchise was based in St. Louis. The Rams ended the regular season tied with New Orleans for the NFL's best record at 13–3. The 13 regular season wins was tied for the second-most in franchise history (along with the 1999 season, only trailing the Rams' 14-win campaign in 2001) and is the most wins in a season for a Los Angeles-based professional football team (as the Rams played in St. Louis in 1999 and 2001).

The Rams started their playoff run by defeating the Dallas Cowboys 30–22 in the divisional round to advance to the NFC Championship Game. This would be their first NFC Championship Game appearance since 2001 as the St. Louis Rams, and their first as the Los Angeles Rams since 1989. The Rams then defeated the number 1 seed New Orleans Saints in the NFC Championship Game 26–23 in overtime. By defeating the Saints, the Rams advanced to Super Bowl LIII, where they faced the New England Patriots. The two teams previously met in Super Bowl XXXVI, in which the Patriots defeated the then-St. Louis Rams 20–17, winning their first Super Bowl title and kicking off their dynasty. This was the Rams' first Super Bowl appearance since that game and first as the Los Angeles Rams since Super Bowl XIV in 1979. In a defensive battle, the Rams lost again to the Patriots 13–3. The Rams missed the playoffs in the following season and followed the next year with an elimination at the division round, before returning to the Super Bowl to win Super Bowl LVI over the Cincinnati Bengals.

== Offseason ==
=== Coaching changes ===
- The Oakland Raiders hired Rams quarterbacks coach Greg Olson as their new offensive coordinator on January 9, 2018.
- Offensive coordinator Matt LaFleur left the Rams to take the same position with the Tennessee Titans on January 30, 2018.

=== Uniform changes ===
The Rams announced during training camp that they would wear their all-white uniforms for the preseason and through the Rams' first two home games of the regular season. Beginning with a Thursday Night game against Minnesota on September 27, the Rams would wear their classic blue-and-yellow throwback uniforms as their primary home uniforms for the remainder of the season and throughout the playoffs (including Super Bowl LIII). Additionally, the team would wear their all-yellow color rush uniforms for scheduled prime time games against San Francisco and Kansas City later in the season.

== Roster changes ==
=== Free agents ===
==== Unrestricted ====
Position	Player	Tag	2018 Team	Date signed
CB	Trumaine Johnson	UFA	New York Jets	March 16, 2018
WR	Sammy Watkins	UFA	Kansas City Chiefs	March 15, 2018
RB	Lance Dunbar	UFA	TBA	
TE	Derek Carrier	UFA	Oakland Raiders	March 15, 2018
CB	Nickell Robey-Coleman	UFA	Los Angeles Rams	March 13, 2018
DE	Dominique Easley	UFA	Los Angeles Rams	March 19, 2018
OLB	Connor Barwin	UFA	New York Giants	
NT	Tyrunn Walker	UFA	New Orleans Saints	
C	John Sullivan	UFA	Los Angeles Rams	March 16, 2018
FS	Lamarcus Joyner	UFA	Los Angeles Rams	March 6, 2018
FS	Cody Davis	UFA	Jacksonville Jaguars	March 15, 2018

Player re-signed by the Rams

=== Free agent signings ===
Position	Player	Tag	2017 team	Date signed
CB	Sam Shields	UFA	Free agent	March 8, 2018
ILB	Ramik Wilson	UFA	Kansas City Chiefs	March 22, 2018
DT	Ndamukong Suh	UFA	Miami Dolphins	March 26, 2018

=== Trades ===
==== Acquired ====
Position	Player	2017 Team	Date obtained	Traded in exchange
WR	Brandin Cooks	New England Patriots	April 3	2018 1st round pick (Isaiah Wynn)
CB	Marcus Peters	Kansas City Chiefs	February 22 (became official on March 14)	2018 4th round pick (Armani Watts); 2019 2nd round pick (Juan Thornhill)

==== Traded away ====
Position	Player	2018 Team	Date traded	Obtained in exchange
LB	Alec Ogletree	New York Giants	March 14 (agreement reached on March 7)	2018 4th round pick (John Franklin-Myers); 2018 6th round pick (John Kelly)
WR	Tavon Austin	Dallas Cowboys	April 28	2018 6th round pick (Jamil Demby)

=== Releases ===
Position	Player	2018 Team	Date released
CB	Kayvon Webster	Houston Texans	April 6, 2018

=== Draft ===
2018 Los Angeles Rams draft
Round	Pick	Player	Position	College	Notes
3	89	Joseph Noteboom	OT	TCU	Pick from OAK
4	111	Brian Allen	C	Michigan St	Pick from MIA
4	135	John Franklin-Myers	DE	Stephen F. Austin	Pick from NYG
5	147	Micah Kiser	LB	Virginia	Pick from CAR
5	160	Ogbonnia Okoronkwo	LB	Oklahoma	Pick from DEN
6	176	John Kelly	RB	Tennessee	Pick from NYG
6	192	Jamil Demby	OT	Maine	Pick from DAL
6	195	Sebastian Joseph-Day	DT	Rutgers	Pick from BUF
6	205	Trevon Young	DE	Louisville	Pick from WSH
7	231	Travin Howard	LB	TCU	Pick from WSH
7	244	Justin Lawler	LB	SMU	Pick from ATL
Made roster † Pro Football Hall of Fame * Made at least one Pro Bowl during career

Draft trades

- The Rams traded their first round selection (No. 23) and sixth round selection (No. 198) to the New England Patriots in exchange for WR Brandin Cooks and the Patriots' fourth round selection (No. 136)
- The Rams traded their second-round selection (56th overall) and cornerback E. J. Gaines to Buffalo in exchange for Buffalo's sixth-round selection (195th overall) and wide receiver Sammy Watkins.
- The Rams traded their third-round selection (87th overall) to Oakland in exchange for Oakland's third- and seventh-round selections (89th and 217th overall).
- The Rams traded their fourth-round selection (124th overall) and second-round selection in 2019 to Kansas City in exchange for Kansas City's sixth-round selection (209th overall) and cornerback Marcus Peters.
- The Rams traded their seventh-round selection in 2019 and linebacker Alec Ogletree to the New York Giants in exchange for the Giants' fourth- and sixth-round selections (135th and 176th overall).
- The Rams traded their fourth round selection acquired from New England (136th overall) to the Carolina Panthers for the Panthers' fifth- and sixth-round selections (147th and 197th).
- The Rams traded their fifth-round selection (160th overall) to Denver in exchange for cornerback Aqib Talib.
- The Rams traded defensive end Robert Quinn and sixth-round selection (209th overall) to the Miami Dolphins in exchange for the Dolphins' fourth- and sixth-round selections (111th and 183rd overall).
- The Rams traded their two sixth-round selections (183rd and 217th overall) to Denver in exchange for Denver's fifth-round selection (160th overall).
- The Rams traded their sixth-round selection (194th overall) to Atlanta in exchange for Atlanta's two seventh-round selections (244th and 256th overall).
- The Rams traded Tavon Austin to the Dallas Cowboys for their sixth-round selection (192nd overall).
- The Rams traded offensive tackle Greg Robinson to Detroit in exchange for Detroit's sixth-round selection (194th overall).
- The Rams traded their seventh-round selection (241st overall) to Washington in exchange for tight end Derek Carrier.

== Staff ==
2018 Los Angeles Rams staff
Front office: Owner/chairman – Stan Kroenke; Executive vice president of football operations/COO – Kevin Demoff; General manager – Les Snead; Senior personnel executive – Brian Xanders; Senior personnel advisor – Taylor Morton; Director of college scouting – Brad Holmes; Director of pro personnel – Ray Agnew; Assistant director of college scouting – Ted Monago; Director of draft management – J. W. Jordan; Senior assistant to general manager / player personnel coordinator – James Gladstone; Head coaches: Head coach – Sean McVay; Assistant head coach/linebackers – Joe Barry; Assistant to the head coach – Bill Nayes; Offensive coaches: Senior offensive assistant – Jedd Fisch; Quarterbacks – Zac Taylor; Running backs – Skip Peete; Wide receivers – Eric Yarber; Assistant wide receivers – Liam Coen; Pass game coordinator – Shane Waldron; Run game coordinator – Aaron Kromer; Assistant offensive line – Andy Dickerson; Offensive quality control – Zak Kromer	Defensive coaches: Defensive coordinator – Wade Phillips; Defensive line – Bill Johnson; Assistant linebackers – Chris Shula; Cornerbacks – Aubrey Pleasant; Safeties – Ejiro Evero; Defensive quality control – Thad Bogardus; Special teams coaches: Special teams coordinator – John Fassel; Assistant special teams – Matt Daniels; Strength and conditioning: Strength and conditioning – Ted Rath; Assistant strength and conditioning – Fernando Noriega; Assistant strength and conditioning – Edward Grayer; Assistant strength and conditioning – Dustin Woods

== Final roster ==
2018 Los Angeles Rams roster
Quarterbacks (QB): 16 Jared Goff; 14 Sean Mannion; Running backs (RB): 35 C. J. Anderson; 33 Justin Davis; 30 Todd Gurley; 42 John Kelly; Wide receivers (WR): 12 Brandin Cooks; 11 KhaDarel Hodge; 19 JoJo Natson RS; 83 Josh Reynolds; 17 Robert Woods; Tight ends (TE): 81 Gerald Everett; 89 Tyler Higbee; 82 Johnny Mundt	Offensive linemen (OL): 55 Brian Allen C; 64 Jamil Demby G; 66 Austin Blythe G; 79 Rob Havenstein T; 70 Joe Noteboom T; 76 Rodger Saffold G; 65 John Sullivan C; 77 Andrew Whitworth T; Defensive linemen (DL): 90 Michael Brockers DE; 99 Aaron Donald DE; 94 John Franklin-Myers DE; 69 Sebastian Joseph-Day NT; 92 Tanzel Smart NT; 93 Ndamukong Suh NT; 95 Ethan Westbrooks DE	Linebackers (LB): 26 Mark Barron ILB; 50 Samson Ebukam OLB; 56 Dante Fowler OLB; 54 Bryce Hager ILB; 59 Micah Kiser ILB; 53 Justin Lawler OLB; 58 Cory Littleton ILB; 96 Matt Longacre OLB; 45 Ogbo Okoronkwo OLB; 52 Ramik Wilson ILB; 49 Trevon Young OLB; Defensive backs (DB): 41 Marqui Christian SS; 24 Blake Countess FS; 32 Troy Hill CB; 43 John Johnson SS; 20 Lamarcus Joyner FS; 22 Marcus Peters CB; 23 Nickell Robey-Coleman CB; 37 Sam Shields CB; 21 Aqib Talib CB; 31 Darious Williams CB; Special teams (ST): 6 Johnny Hekker P; 44 Jake McQuaide LS; 4 Greg Zuerlein K	Practice squad: 8 Brandon Allen QB; 27 Donte Deayon CB; 68 J. J. Dielman G (PS/I); 48 Travin Howard ILB; 87 Henry Krieger-Coble TE; 71 Kyle Murphy T; 72 Aaron Neary C; 38 Steven Parker SS; 13 Austin Proehl WR; 47 Ramon Richards CB; 63 Darrell Williams Jr. T; Reserve: 34 Malcolm Brown RB (IR); 91 Dominique Easley OLB (IR); 97 Morgan Fox DE (IR); 36 Dominique Hatfield CB (IR); 18 Cooper Kupp WR (IR); 25 Kevin Peterson CB (IR); 56 Garrett Sickels OLB (IR); 88 Mike Thomas WR (IR); Rookies in italics 53 active, 9 reserve, 10 practice squad

== Preseason ==
Week	Date	Opponent	Result	Record	Venue	Recap
1	August 9	at Baltimore Ravens	L 7–33	0–1	M&T Bank Stadium	Recap
2	August 18	Oakland Raiders	W 19–15	1–1	Los Angeles Memorial Coliseum	Recap
3	August 25	Houston Texans	W 21–20	2–1	Los Angeles Memorial Coliseum	Recap
4	August 30	at New Orleans Saints	L 0–28	2–2	Mercedes-Benz Superdome	Recap

Head coach Sean McVay drew considerable attention when he opted to keep his entire starting offense and most of his starting defense off the field for the entire preseason. Other than a few defensive series against Houston, no starters saw any action during the exhibition schedule.

== Regular season ==
=== Schedule ===
Week	Date	Opponent	Result	Record	Venue	Recap
1	September 10	at Oakland Raiders	**W** 33–13	1–0	Oakland–Alameda County Coliseum	Recap
2	September 16	**Arizona Cardinals**	**W** 34–0	2–0	Los Angeles Memorial Coliseum	Recap
3	September 23	Los Angeles Chargers	**W** 35–23	3–0	Los Angeles Memorial Coliseum	Recap
4	September 27	Minnesota Vikings	**W** 38–31	4–0	Los Angeles Memorial Coliseum	Recap
5	October 7	at **Seattle Seahawks**	**W** 33–31	5–0	CenturyLink Field	Recap
6	October 14	at Denver Broncos	**W** 23–20	6–0	Broncos Stadium at Mile High	Recap
7	October 21	at **San Francisco 49ers**	**W** 39–10	7–0	Levi's Stadium	Recap
8	October 28	Green Bay Packers	**W** 29–27	8–0	Los Angeles Memorial Coliseum	Recap
9	November 4	at New Orleans Saints	**L** 35–45	8–1	Mercedes-Benz Superdome	Recap
10	November 11	**Seattle Seahawks**	**W** 36–31	9–1	Los Angeles Memorial Coliseum	Recap
11	November 19	Kansas City Chiefs	**W** 54–51	10–1	Los Angeles Memorial Coliseum	Recap
12	Bye					
13	December 2	at Detroit Lions	**W** 30–16	11–1	Ford Field	Recap
14	December 9	at Chicago Bears	**L** 6–15	11–2	Soldier Field	Recap
15	December 16	Philadelphia Eagles	**L** 23–30	11–3	Los Angeles Memorial Coliseum	Recap
16	December 23	at **Arizona Cardinals**	**W** 31–9	12–3	State Farm Stadium	Recap
17	December 30	**San Francisco 49ers**	**W** 48–32	13–3	Los Angeles Memorial Coliseum	Recap

Notes:

- Intra-division opponents are in **bold** text.
- The Week 11 game against the Kansas City Chiefs was originally scheduled to be played in Mexico City in Estadio Azteca as a part of the league's International Series, but was moved to Los Angeles due to concerns over the playing surface.

=== Game summaries ===
==== Week 1: at Oakland Raiders ====
Week One: Los Angeles Rams at Oakland Raiders – Game summary

Quarter	1	2	3	4	Total
**Rams**	7	3	10	13	**33**
Raiders	7	6	0	0	**13**

at Oakland–Alameda County Coliseum, Oakland, California

- Date: September 10
- Game time: 7:20 p.m. PDT
- Game weather: 69 °F (21 °C), Clear
- Game attendance: 53,857
- Referee: Ronald Torbert
- TV announcers (ESPN/KABC): Joe Tessitore, Jason Witten, Booger McFarland and Lisa Salters
- Recap, Gamebook

Game information

**First quarter**

- OAK – Marshawn Lynch 10-yard run (Mike Nugent kick), 10:32. Raiders 7–0. **Drive: 7 plays, 75 yards, 4:37.**
- LAR – Todd Gurley 19-yard pass from Jared Goff (Greg Zuerlein kick), 4:59. Tied 7–7. **Drive: 4 plays, 50 yards, 1:14.**

**Second quarter**

- OAK – Mike Nugent 24-yard field goal, 12:33. Raiders 10–7. **Drive: 12 plays, 69 yards, 7:22.**
- LAR – Greg Zuerlein 20-yard field goal, 2:43. Tied 10–10. **Drive: 7 plays, 78 yards, 2:11.**
- OAK – Mike Nugent 48-yard field goal, 0:15. Raiders 13–10. **Drive: 11 plays, 45 yards, 2:30.**

**Third quarter**

- LAR – Greg Zuerlein 28-yard field goal, 9:07. Tied 13–13. **Drive: 10 plays, 60 yards, 5:56.**
- LAR – Cooper Kupp 8-yard pass from Jared Goff (Greg Zuerlein kick), 0:03. Rams 20–13. **Drive: 4 plays, 58 yards, 1:42.**

**Fourth quarter**

- LAR – Greg Zuerlein 55-yard field goal, 9:24. Rams 23–13. **Drive: 11 plays, 51 yards, 4:15.**
- LAR – Greg Zuerlein 20-yard field goal, 3:18. Rams 26–13. **Drive: 13 plays, 69 yards, 4:43.**
- LAR – Marcus Peters 50-yard interception return (Greg Zuerlein kick), 2:11. Rams 33–13.

**Top passers**

- LAR – Jared Goff – 18/33, 233 yards, 2 TD
- OAK – Derek Carr – 29/40, 303 yards, 3 INT

**Top rushers**

- LAR – Todd Gurley – 20 rushes, 108 yards, TD
- OAK – Marshawn Lynch – 11 rushes, 41 yards, TD

**Top receivers**

- LAR – Brandin Cooks – 5 receptions, 87 yards
- OAK – Jared Cook – 9 receptions, 180 yards

The final game of Week 1 featured a highly anticipated showdown between head coaches Sean McVay and Jon Gruden, who had given McVay his first job as an NFL coach when both were at Tampa Bay. In front of a sellout crowd in Oakland that enthusiastically greeted Gruden in his return to coaching after a 10-year absence, the Raiders took an early lead on a touchdown run by running back Marshawn Lynch. The Rams responded as Todd Gurley took a short pass from Jared Goff and ran 19 yards for a touchdown. Los Angeles finally took the lead at the end of the third quarter as Goff connected with wide receiver Cooper Kupp for an 8-yard scoring pass. Kicker Greg Zuerlein was named NFC Special Teams Player of the Week after converting four field goals and three PATs. Defensively, the Rams kept Oakland out of the end zone after that opening-drive touchdown, led by linebacker Cory Littleton (11 tackles) and safety John Johnson, who both had interceptions to kill Raider scoring drives. Making his debut as a Ram, cornerback Marcus Peters picked off a Derek Carr pass and returned it 50 yards for a touchdown with just over two minutes remaining for the game's final score.

==== Week 2: vs. Arizona Cardinals ====
Week Two: Arizona Cardinals at Los Angeles Rams – Game summary

Quarter	1	2	3	4	Total
Cardinals	0	0	0	0	**0**
**Rams**	0	19	8	7	**34**

at Los Angeles Memorial Coliseum, Los Angeles, California

- Date: September 16
- Game time: 1:05 pm. PDT
- Game weather: 86 °F (30 °C), sunny
- Game attendance: 66,515
- Referee: Craig Wrolstad
- TV announcers (Fox): Dick Stockton, Mark Schlereth and Jennifer Hale
- Recap, Gamebook

Game information

**First quarter** **Second quarter**

- LAR - Todd Gurley 11-yard run (Todd Gurley run), 14:29. Rams 8-0. **Drive: 4 plays, 59 yards, 1:19.**
- LAR - Johnny Hekker 20-yard field goal, 8:07. Rams 11-0. **Drive: 11 plays, 52 yards, 4:45.**
- LAR - Todd Gurley 1-yard run (Todd Gurley run), 0:00. Rams 19-0. **Drive: 8 plays, 32 yards, 4:18.**

**Third quarter**

- LAR - Todd Gurley 2-yard run (Jared Goff-Malcolm Brown pass), 3:39. Rams 27-0. **Drive: 5 plays, 56 yards, 2:10.**

**Fourth quarter**

- LAR - Tyler Higbee 3-yard pass from Jared Goff (Johnny Hekker kick), 3:17. Rams 34-0. **Drive: 7 plays, 25 yards, 3:45.**

**Top passers**

- ARI – Sam Bradford - 17/27, 90 yards, INT
- LAR – Jared Goff - 24/32, 354 yards, TD, INT

**Top rushers**

- ARI – David Johnson - 13 rushes, 48 yards
- LAR – Malcolm Brown - 12 rushes, 46 yards

**Top receivers**

- ARI – Larry Fitzgerald - 3 receptions, 28 yards
- LAR – Brandin Cooks - 7 receptions, 159 yards

Opening a three-game home stand at the Los Angeles Memorial Coliseum, the Rams crushed the visiting Cardinals, who were limited to just 137 total offensive yards and did not pass the 50-yard line until the game's final minute. Former Rams quarterback Sam Bradford had a rough day against the team that drafted him No. 1 overall in 2010, throwing for only 90 yards and an interception by Rams cornerback Sam Shields. Strong safety John Johnson led the Rams with seven tackles, while linebacker Samson Ebukam added a sack. Offensively for Los Angeles, quarterback Jared Goff passed for 354 yards and a touchdown to tight end Tyler Higbee. Running back Todd Gurley totaled only 42 yards on the ground, but equaled his career high with three rushing touchdowns while rushing for a pair of two-point conversions after each of his first two scores. Goff passed to Malcolm Brown for two points after Gurley's third touchdown. The Rams opted for the two-point attempts after kicker Greg Zuerlein pulled a groin muscle during pregame warmups. Punter Johnny Hekker, normally the holder for placekicks, stepped in and converted a 20-yard field goal in the second quarter, and then a PAT attempt after the Rams' final touchdown (Cooper Kupp held on both attempts). With the win, the Rams improved to 2-0, the first time the team started the season with two straight wins since 2001.

==== Week 3: vs. Los Angeles Chargers ====
Week Three: Los Angeles Chargers at Los Angeles Rams – Game summary

Quarter	1	2	3	4	Total
Chargers	6	7	7	3	**23**
**Rams**	14	7	14	0	**35**

at Los Angeles Memorial Coliseum, Los Angeles, California

- Date: September 23
- Game time: 1:05 pm. PDT
- Game weather: 80 °F (27 °C), sunny
- Game attendance: 68,947
- Referee: John Hussey
- TV announcers (CBS): Ian Eagle, Dan Fouts and Evan Washburn
- Recap, Gamebook

Game information

**First quarter**

- LAR – Todd Gurley 1-yard run (Sam Ficken kick), 6:14. Rams 7–0. **Drive: 11 plays, 80 yards, 5:50.**
- LAC – Mike Williams 42-yard pass from Philip Rivers (kick failed), 4:42. Rams 7–6. **Drive: 3 plays, 60 yards, 1:32.**
- LAR – Robert Woods 3-yard pass from Jared Goff (Sam Ficken kick), 0:51. Rams 14–6. **Drive: 7 plays, 75 yards, 3:31.**

**Second quarter**

- LAR – Blake Countess blocked punt recovery in end zone (Sam Ficken kick), 7:44. Rams 21–6.
- LAC – Melvin Gordon 11-yard run (Caleb Sturgis kick), 3:12. Rams 21–13. **Drive: 10 plays, 75 yards, 4:32.**

**Third quarter**

- LAR – Cooper Kupp 53-yard pass from Jared Goff (Sam Ficken kick), 12:38. Rams 28–13. **Drive: 3 plays, 55 yards, 0:51.**
- LAC – Mike Williams 20-yard pass from Philip Rivers (Caleb Sturgis kick), 8:18. Rams 28–20. **Drive: 8 plays, 75 yards, 4:20.**
- LAR – Robert Woods 6-yard pass from Jared Goff (Sam Ficken kick), 3:19. Rams 35–20. **Drive: 11 plays, 77 yards, 4:59.**

**Fourth quarter**

- LAC – Caleb Sturgis 26-yard field goal, 11:49. Rams 35–23. **Drive: 11 plays, 58 yards, 6:30.**

**Top passers**

- LAC – Philip Rivers – 18/30, 226 yards, 2 TD
- LAR – Jared Goff – 29/36, 354 yards, 3 TD, 1 INT

**Top rushers**

- LAC – Melvin Gordon – 15 carries, 80 yards, 1 TD
- LAR – Todd Gurley – 23 carries, 105 yards, 1 TD

**Top receivers**

- LAC – Mike Williams – 4 receptions, 81 yards, 2 TD
- LAR – Robert Woods – 10 receptions, 104 yards, 2 TD

Hosting the Chargers in Los Angeles for the first time since 1991 (not counting preseason), the Rams would never trail as Todd Gurley rushed for 105 yards and scored the game's first touchdown. Jared Goff and Robert Woods connected for a touchdown at the end of the first quarter. Cory Littleton blocked a punt which was recovered in the end zone for a touchdown by Blake Countess in the second quarter as the Rams led 21-13. Countess was later named NFC Special Teams Player of the Week. During the third quarter, Goff (354 passing yards) threw two more touchdowns, one to Cooper Kupp and a second one to Woods, who finished with 10 receptions for 104 yards. The Rams offense was efficient, totaling 33 first downs to just 16 for the Chargers. Ndamukong Suh had a sack and a fumble recovery, while Littleton led the Rams with 10 tackles.

==== Week 4: vs. Minnesota Vikings ====
Week Four: Minnesota Vikings at Los Angeles Rams – Game summary

Quarter	1	2	3	4	Total
Vikings	7	13	8	3	**31**
**Rams**	7	21	10	0	**38**

at Los Angeles Memorial Coliseum, Los Angeles, California

- Date: September 27
- Game time: 5:20 pm. PDT
- Game weather: 75 °F (24 °C), clear, sunny
- Game attendance: 72,027
- Referee: Brad Allen
- TV announcers (Fox/NFLN): Joe Buck, Troy Aikman, Erin Andrews, Kristina Pink and Mike Pereira; (Amazon Prime): Hannah Storm and Andrea Kremer
- Recap, Gamebook

Game information

**First quarter**

- MIN – Aldrick Robinson 16-yard pass from Kirk Cousins (Dan Bailey kick), 7:55. Vikings 7–0. **Drive: 13 plays, 75 yards, 7:05.**
- LAR – Todd Gurley 8-yard pass from Jared Goff (Sam Ficken kick), 1:55. Tied 7–7. **Drive: 12 plays, 75 yards, 6:00.**

**Second quarter**

- MIN – Dan Bailey 37-yard field goal, 10:05. Vikings 10–7. **Drive: 12 plays, 56 yards, 6:50.**
- LAR – Cooper Kupp 70-yard pass from Jared Goff (Sam Ficken kick), 9:28. Rams 14–10. **Drive: 2 plays, 75 yards, 0:37.**
- MIN – Aldrick Robinson 17-yard pass from Kirk Cousins (Dan Bailey kick), 8:04. Vikings 17–14. **Drive: 3 plays, 75 yards, 1:24.**
- LAR – Cooper Kupp 19-yard pass from Jared Goff (Sam Ficken kick), 3:47. Rams 21–17. **Drive: 4 plays, 71 yards, 1:50.**
- LAR – Brandin Cooks 47-yard pass from Jared Goff (Sam Ficken kick), 1:26. Rams 28–17. **Drive: 2 plays, 73 yards, 0:15.**
- MIN – Dan Bailey 39-yard field goal, 0:02. Rams 28–20. **Drive: 9 plays, 49 yards, 1:24.**

**Third quarter**

- LAR – Sam Ficken 34-yard field goal, 5:21. Rams 31–20. **Drive: 6 plays, 68 yards, 3:01.**
- MIN – Adam Thielen 45-yard pass from Kirk Cousins (Kirk Cousins-Latavius Murray pass), 3:35. Rams 31–28. **Drive: 5 plays, 75 yards, 1:46.**
- LAR – Robert Woods 31-yard pass from Jared Goff (Sam Ficken kick), 1:09. Rams 38–28. **Drive: 5 plays, 75 yards, 2:26.**

**Fourth quarter**

- MIN – Dan Bailey 40-yard field goal, 3:46. Rams 38–31. **Drive: 9 plays, 58 yards, 4:35.**

**Top passers**

- MIN – Kirk Cousins – 36/50, 422 yards, 3 TD
- LAR – Jared Goff – 26/33, 465 yards, 5 TD

**Top rushers**

- MIN – Kirk Cousins – 4 carries, 28 yards
- LAR – Todd Gurley – 17 carries, 83 yards, 1 TD

**Top receivers**

- MIN – Stefon Diggs – 11 receptions, 123 yards
- LAR – Cooper Kupp – 9 receptions, 162 yards, 2 TD

Jared Goff was named NFC Offensive Player of the Week after passing for a career-high 465 yards (the third-highest single-game total in team history) and five touchdowns to four different receivers. Todd Gurley (21 touches, 156 total offensive yards) caught the first TD pass in the first quarter, while Cooper Kupp scored twice and Brandin Cooks scored once in the second quarter on the way to a 28-20 Rams lead. Sam Ficken kicked a 34-yard field goal and Robert Woods caught the Rams' final score on a 31-yard pass late in the third period. Woods (five receptions, 101 yards, 1 TD), Cooks (seven receptions, 116 yards, 1 TD), and Kupp (nine receptions, 162 yards, 2 TDs) were the first wide receiver trio in team history to each go over 100 yards and score a touchdown in the same game. Defensively, Aaron Donald recorded his first two sacks of the season, and John Johnson had a team-high 11 tackles. This game also made history as the first-ever NFL broadcast to use an all-female announcing team, with Hannah Storm and Andrea Kremer providing play-by-play and commentary respectively via Amazon Prime streaming service.

==== Week 5: at Seattle Seahawks ====
Week Five: Los Angeles Rams at Seattle Seahawks – Game summary

Quarter	1	2	3	4	Total
**Rams**	7	10	7	9	**33**
Seahawks	7	10	14	0	**31**

at CenturyLink Field, Seattle, Washington

- Date: October 7
- Game time: 1:25 pm. PDT
- Game weather: 53 °F (12 °C), rain
- Game attendance: 68,893
- Referee: Clete Blakeman
- TV announcers (Fox): Sam Rosen, Ronde Barber and Joy Taylor
- Recap, Gamebook

Game information

**First quarter**

- SEA – Mike Davis 6-yard run (Sebastian Janikowski kick), 4:30. Seahawks 7–0. **Drive: 9 plays, 74 yards, 5:45.**
- LAR – Todd Gurley 2-yard run (Cairo Santos kick), 2:00. Tied 7–7. **Drive: 5 plays, 58 yards, 2:30.**

**Second quarter**

- LAR – Cairo Santos 19-yard field goal, 11:13. Rams 10–7. **Drive: 8 plays, 79 yards, 3:35.**
- SEA – Tyler Lockett 39-yard pass from Russell Wilson (Sebastian Janikowski kick), 9:11. Seahawks 14–10. **Drive: 4 plays, 50 yards, 2:02.**
- LAR – Cooper Kupp 6-yard pass from Jared Goff (Cairo Santos kick), 6:02. Rams 17–14. **Drive: 8 plays, 70 yards, 3:09.**
- SEA – Sebastian Janikowski 52-yard field goal, 1:55. Tied 17–17. **Drive: 8 plays, 27 yards, 4:07.**

**Third quarter**

- SEA – David Moore 3-yard pass from Russell Wilson (Sebastian Janikowski kick), 10:34. Seahawks 24–17. **Drive: 9 plays, 75 yards, 4:26.**
- LAR – Todd Gurley 2-yard run (Cairo Santos kick), 5:04. Tied 24–24. **Drive: 9 plays, 64 yards, 5:30.**
- SEA – David Moore 30-yard pass from Russell Wilson (Sebastian Janikowski kick), 1:35. Seahawks 31–24. **Drive: 7 plays, 75 yards, 3:29.**

**Fourth quarter**

- LAR – Todd Gurley 5-yard run (failed kick), 14:54. Seahawks 31–30. **Drive: 5 plays, 74 yards, 1:41.**
- LAR – Cairo Santos 39-yard field goal, 6:05. Rams 33–31. **Drive: 9 plays, 61 yards, 4:29.**

**Top passers**

- LAR – Jared Goff – 23/32, 321 yards, 1 TD, 2 INT
- SEA – Russell Wilson – 13/21, 198 yards, 3 TD

**Top rushers**

- LAR – Todd Gurley – 22 carries, 77 yards, 3 TD
- SEA – Chris Carson – 19 carries, 116 yards

**Top receivers**

- LAR – Cooper Kupp – 6 receptions, 90 yards, 1 TD
- SEA – Tyler Lockett – 3 receptions, 98 yards, 1 TD

It was a tight battle throughout at CenturyLink Field between the NFC West rivals. Todd Gurley scored three touchdowns on the ground, and Jared Goff threw for 321 yards and a touchdown pass to Cooper Kupp. New kicker Cairo Santos converted two field goals, the second one coming from 39 yards out to put the Rams into the lead with 6:05 remaining in the game. Seahawks quarterback Russell Wilson threw for three touchdowns, but was sacked twice and held without a rushing attempt for the first time in his career. The outcome wasn't decided until the final minute when Goff converted a 4th-and-1 play at L.A.'s 42-yard-line with 1:39 remaining. The successful 2-yard quarterback sneak allowed the Rams to run out the clock.

==== Week 6: at Denver Broncos ====
Week Six: Los Angeles Rams at Denver Broncos – Game summary

Quarter	1	2	3	4	Total
**Rams**	6	7	7	3	**23**
Broncos	3	0	7	10	**20**

at Broncos Stadium at Mile High, Denver, Colorado

- Date: October 14
- Game time: 1:05 pm. PDT/2:05 p.m. MDT
- Game weather: 25 °F (−4 °C), mostly cloudy
- Game attendance: 76,109
- Referee: Shawn Smith
- TV announcers (Fox): Dick Stockton, Mark Schlereth and Jennifer Hale
- Recap, Gamebook

Game information

**First quarter**

- LAR – Cairo Santos 26-yard field goal, 11:23. Rams 3–0. **Drive: 7 plays, 63 yards, 2:03.**
- LAR – Cairo Santos 39-yard field goal, 4:21. Rams 6–0. **Drive: 9 plays, 71 yards, 4:26.**
- DEN – Brandon McManus 28-yard field goal, 0:03. Rams 6–3. **Drive: 9 plays, 65 yards, 4:18.**

**Second quarter**

- LAR – Todd Gurley 10-yard run (Cairo Santos kick), 10:57. Rams 13–3. **Drive: 7 plays, 66 yards, 4:06.**

**Third quarter**

- LAR – Todd Gurley 1-yard run (Cairo Santos kick), 6:09. Rams 20–3. **Drive: 8 plays, 58 yards, 4:00.**
- DEN – Emmanuel Sanders 22-yard pass from Case Keenum (Brandon McManus kick), 1:34. Rams 20–10. **Drive: 1 play, 12 yards, 0:31.**

**Fourth quarter**

- DEN – Brandon McManus 24-yard field goal, 8:54. Rams 20–13. **Drive: 5 plays, 57 yards, 1:20.**
- LAR – Cairo Santos 21-yard field goal, 3:15. Rams 23–13. **Drive: 13 plays, 72 yards, 5:39.**
- DEN – Demaryius Thomas 1-yard pass from Case Keenum (Brandon McManus kick), 1:22. Rams 23–20. **Drive: 9 plays, 77 yards, 1:53.**

**Top passers**

- LAR – Jared Goff – 14/28, 201 yards, INT
- DEN – Case Keenum – 25/41, 322 yards, 2 TD, INT

**Top rushers**

- LAR – Todd Gurley – 28 rushes, 208 yards, 2 TD
- DEN – Royce Freeman – 9 rushes, 22 yards

**Top receivers**

- LAR – Robert Woods – 7 receptions, 109 yards
- DEN – Emmanuel Sanders – 7 receptions, 115 yards, TD

Running back Todd Gurley turned in a career-best performance, rushing for 208 yards on 28 carries and scoring two touchdowns as the Rams built a 20-3 lead and then held on against the host Broncos. For his effort, Gurley was named NFC Offensive Player of the Week. Robert Woods caught 10 passes for 109 yards and Jared Goff passed for 201 yards but was held without a touchdown for the first time during the season. Cairo Santos kicked three field goals for the Rams, and free safety Lamarcus Joyner led the Rams on defense with seven tackles. With the win, the Rams improved to 6-0 (matching their best start since 2001) and, following the Chiefs' loss to the Patriots later that evening, ended the day as the NFL's lone remaining unbeaten team. Despite the win, the Rams had by far their lowest score to this point, only putting up 23 points while the lowest they had scored before was 33. Also, this game was played on Jared Goff's 24th birthday.

==== Week 7: at San Francisco 49ers ====
Week Seven: Los Angeles Rams at San Francisco 49ers – Game summary

Quarter	1	2	3	4	Total
**Rams**	3	19	10	7	**39**
49ers	0	7	3	0	**10**

at Levi's Stadium, Santa Clara, California

- Date: October 21
- Game time: 1:25 pm. PDT
- Game weather: 62 °F (17 °C), clear
- Game attendance: 66,597
- Referee: Walt Anderson
- TV announcers (CBS): Kevin Harlan, Rich Gannon and Steve Tasker
- Recap, Gamebook

Game information

**First quarter**

- LAR – Greg Zuerlein 35-yard field goal, 6:34. Rams 3–0. **Drive: 7 plays, 27 yards, 3:24.**

**Second quarter**

- LAR – Todd Gurley 7-yard run (Greg Zuerlein kick), 14:23. Rams 10–0. **Drive: 4 plays, 21 yards, 1:37.**
- LAR – Punt blocked by Cory Littleton out of bounds in end zone for a safety, 12:59. Rams 12–0.
- LAR – Greg Zuerlein 37-yard field goal, 10:05. Rams 15–0. **Drive: 5 plays, 34 yards, 2:54.**
- LAR – Brandin Cooks 19-yard pass from Jared Goff (Greg Zuerlein kick), 2:30. Rams 22–0. **Drive: 8 plays, 60 yards, 3:47.**
- SF – George Kittle 10-yard pass from C. J. Beathard (Robbie Gould kick), 0:13. Rams 22–7. **Drive: 8 plays, 75 yards, 2:17.**

**Third quarter**

- LAR – Greg Zuerlein 33-yard field goal, 8:06. Rams 25–7. **Drive: 11 plays, 60 yards, 4:46.**
- LAR – Todd Gurley 1-yard run (Greg Zuerlein kick), 6:04. Rams 32–7. **Drive: 3 plays, 27 yards, 0:55.**
- SF – Robbie Gould 51-yard field goal, 2:37. Rams 32–10. **Drive: 8 plays, 42 yards, 3:27.**

**Fourth quarter**

- LAR – Todd Gurley 12-yard pass from Jared Goff (Greg Zuerlein kick), 11:35. Rams 39–10. **Drive: 2 plays, 13 yards, 0:38.**

**Top passers**

- LAR – Jared Goff – 18/24, 202 yards, 2 TD
- SF – C. J. Beathard – 15/27, 170 yards, 1 TD, 2 INT

**Top rushers**

- LAR – Malcolm Brown – 13 carries, 65 yards
- SF – Raheem Mostert – 7 carries, 59 yards

**Top receivers**

- LAR – Robert Woods – 5 receptions, 78 yards
- SF – George Kittle – 5 receptions, 98 yards, 1 TD

The Rams improved to 7-0, the best start since 1985, in scoring their largest margin of victory at San Francisco in 60 years (a 33-3 Rams victory at Kezar Stadium in 1958). Defensive tackle Aaron Donald had the finest day of his professional career with nine tackles (eight solo), six tackles for loss (including four sacks), plus a forced fumble and fumble recovery and was named NFC Defensive Player of the Week. Linebacker Cory Littleton added two sacks to go with his team-leading 10 total tackles, while John Johnson and Troy Hill both came up with interceptions. Rams quarterback Jared Goff had an efficient day, completing 18 of 24 passes for 202 yards with touchdown passes to Brandin Cooks and Todd Gurley, who also added two rushing touchdowns to add to his league-leading 14 total touchdowns on the season.

==== Week 8: vs. Green Bay Packers ====
Week Eight: Green Bay Packers at Los Angeles Rams – Game summary

Quarter	1	2	3	4	Total
Packers	7	3	10	7	**27**
**Rams**	0	8	15	6	**29**

at Los Angeles Memorial Coliseum, Los Angeles, California

- Date: October 28
- Game time: 1:25 pm. PDT
- Game weather: 82 °F (28 °C), cloudy
- Game attendance: 75,822
- Referee: Ronald Torbert
- TV announcers (Fox): Thom Brennaman, Troy Aikman, Erin Andrews and Mike Pereira
- Recap, Gamebook

Game information

**First quarter**

- GB – Jamaal Williams 1-yard run (Mason Crosby kick), 6:05. Packers 7–0. **Drive: 6 plays, 75 yards, 2:03.**

**Second quarter**

- GB – Mason Crosby 41-yard field goal, 14:23. Packers 10–0. **Drive: 7 plays, 45 yards, 3:53.**
- LAR – Aaron Jones tackled in the end zone by Mark Barron for a safety, 2:54. Packers 10–2.
- LAR – Josh Reynolds 1-yard pass from Jared Goff (run failed), 0:25. Packers 10–8. **Drive: 7 plays, 72 yards, 2:26.**

**Third quarter**

- GB – Mason Crosby 53-yard field goal, 9:43. Packers 13–8. **Drive: 9 plays, 38 yards, 4:19.**
- LAR – Todd Gurley 30-yard pass from Jared Goff (Jared Goff-Todd Gurley pass), 7:28. Rams 16–13. **Drive: 7 plays, 75 yards, 2:19.**
- LAR – Josh Reynolds 19-yard pass from Jared Goff (Greg Zuerlein kick), 1:56. Rams 23–13. **Drive: 8 plays, 66 yards, 4:17.**
- GB – Aaron Jones 33-yard run (Mason Crosby kick), 0:21. Rams 23–20. **Drive: 5 plays, 75 yards, 1:37.**

**Fourth quarter**

- LAR – Greg Zuerlein 43-yard field goal, 11:44. Rams 26–20. **Drive: 8 plays, 50 yards, 3:34.**
- GB – Marquez Valdes-Scantling 40-yard pass from Aaron Rodgers (Mason Crosby kick), 8:57. Packers 27–26. **Drive: 5 plays, 75 yards, 2:49.**
- LAR – Greg Zuerlein 34-yard field goal, 2:09. Rams 29–27. **Drive: 7 plays, 24 yards, 3:15.**

**Top passers**

- GB – Aaron Rodgers – 18/30, 286 yards, TD
- LAR – Jared Goff – 19/35, 295 yards, 3 TD

**Top rushers**

- GB – Aaron Jones – 12 rushes, 86 yards, TD
- LAR – Todd Gurley – 25 rushes, 114 yards

**Top receivers**

- GB – Davante Adams – 5 receptions, 133 yards
- LAR – Todd Gurley – 6 receptions, 81 yards, TD

The Rams fell behind early, but battled back from a 10-0 deficit to defeat the visiting Packers. Late in the second quarter, a 52-yard punt by Johnny Hekker was downed at the Green Bay 1 by Sam Shields. One play later, linebacker Mark Barron stuffed Packers running back Aaron Jones for a safety with 2:54 remaining in the half. Receiving the free kick, the Rams drove 72 yards in seven plays when Jared Goff connected with Josh Reynolds for a 1-yard touchdown pass to cut the Packers lead to 10-8. In the third quarter, Goff threw touchdown passes to Todd Gurley and to Reynolds again for a 23-13 lead. Green Bay reclaimed the lead with two touchdowns sandwiched around a Greg Zuerlein field goal to lead 27-26 in the fourth quarter. Zuerlein put the Rams back on top with a 34-yard field goal just before the two-minute warning. On the ensuing kickoff, the Packers' Ty Montgomery ran the return out of the end zone when he collided with Rams defender Ramik Wilson, who stripped the ball and recovered the fumble. The Rams then ran out the clock, as Gurley (114 yards, 14 carries) went down voluntarily after picking up L.A.'s last first down to preserve the victory. With the win, the Rams improved to 8-0 for the first time since 1969.

==== Week 9: at New Orleans Saints ====
Week Nine: Los Angeles Rams at New Orleans Saints – Game summary

Quarter	1	2	3	4	Total
Rams	7	10	10	8	**35**
**Saints**	14	21	0	10	**45**

at Mercedes-Benz Superdome, New Orleans, Louisiana

- Date: November 4
- Game time: 1:25 pm. PST/3:25 p.m. CST
- Game weather: Played indoors (dome stadium)
- Game attendance: 73,086
- Referee: Bill Vinovich
- TV announcers (Fox): Joe Buck, Troy Aikman and Erin Andrews
- Recap, Gamebook

Game information

**First quarter**

- NO – Alvin Kamara 11-yard run (Wil Lutz kick), 9:25. Saints 7–0. **Drive: 10 plays, 75 yards, 5:35.**
- LAR – Todd Gurley 8-yard run (Greg Zuerlein kick), 6:04. Tied 7–7. **Drive: 6 plays, 71 yards, 3:21.**
- NO – Alvin Kamara 16-yard pass from Drew Brees (Wil Lutz kick), 1:40. Saints 14–7. **Drive: 8 plays, 75 yards, 4:24.**

**Second quarter**

- LAR – Brandin Cooks 4-yard pass from Jared Goff (Greg Zuerlein kick), 14:12. Tied 14–14. **Drive: 6 plays, 75 yards, 2:28.**
- NO – Tre'Quan Smith 4-yard pass from Drew Brees (Wil Lutz kick), 7:35. Saints 21–14. **Drive: 10 plays, 87 yards, 5:31.**
- NO – Benjamin Watson 13-yard pass from Drew Brees (Wil Lutz kick), 1:06. Saints 28–14. **Drive: 6 plays, 59 yards, 2:24.**
- NO – Alvin Kamara 1-yard run (Wil Lutz kick), 0:26. Saints 35–14. **Drive: 6 plays, 34 yards, 0:33.**
- LAR – Greg Zuerlein 56-yard field goal, 0:00. Saints 35–17. **Drive: 5 plays, 37 yards, 0:26.**

**Third quarter**

- LAR – Malcolm Brown 18-yard pass from Jared Goff (Greg Zuerlein kick), 9:38. Saints 35–24. **Drive: 11 plays, 77 yards, 5:22.**
- LAR – Greg Zuerlein 34-yard field goal, 1:30. Saints 35–27. **Drive: 9 plays, 68 yards, 3:56.**

**Fourth quarter**

- LAR – Cooper Kupp 41-yard pass from Jared Goff (Jared Goff-Gerald Everett pass), 9:48. Tied 35–35. **Drive: 6 plays, 83 yards, 3:39.**
- NO – Wil Lutz 54-yard field goal, 6:23. Saints 38–35. **Drive: 9 plays, 40 yards, 3:23.**
- NO – Michael Thomas 72-yard pass from Drew Brees (Wil Lutz kick), 3:52. Saints 45–35. **Drive: 3 plays, 75 yards, 0:58.**

**Top passers**

- LAR – Jared Goff – 28/40, 391 yards, 3 TD, 1 INT
- NO – Drew Brees – 25/36, 346 yards, 4 TD

**Top rushers**

- LAR – Todd Gurley – 13 carries, 68 yards, 1 TD
- NO – Alvin Kamara – 19 carries, 82 yards, 2 TD

**Top receivers**

- LAR – Brandin Cooks – 6 receptions, 114 yards, 1 TD
- NO – Michael Thomas – 12 receptions, 211 yards, 1 TD

The Rams fell behind 35-14 late in the second quarter, but rallied to tie the game behind the passing of Jared Goff (28 of 40, 391 yards, three TDs), but ultimately could not overcome the host Saints and suffered their first loss of the season. New Orleans quarterback Drew Brees passed for 346 yards and four touchdowns, including a 72-yard scoring strike to Michael Thomas who taunted the Rams by re enacting Joe Horn's cellphone celebration upon scoring a touchdown, putting the game out of reach. Defensively, John Johnson and Cory Littleton had nine tackles each for the Rams. Brandin Cooks had six receptions for 114 yards and a touchdown, and with his 8-yard touchdown run in the first quarter, Todd Gurley set a new Rams team record by scoring a touchdown in 12 straight games, breaking the mark he shared with Elroy "Crazy Legs" Hirsch. Both Cooks and cornerback Marcus Peters expressed anger at Thomas for the post-scoring gesture, but primarily took offense at Saints' head coach Sean Payton; attacking Peters during his post-game interview.

After losing this game, they met again in the NFC Championship, beating the Saints.

==== Week 10: vs. Seattle Seahawks ====
Week Ten: Seattle Seahawks at Los Angeles Rams – Game summary

Quarter	1	2	3	4	Total
Seahawks	14	0	7	10	**31**
**Rams**	7	10	3	16	**36**

at Los Angeles Memorial Coliseum, Los Angeles, California

- Date: November 11
- Game time: 1:25 pm. PST
- Game weather: 75 °F (24 °C), sunny
- Game attendance: 72,755
- Referee: John Hussey
- TV announcers (CBS): Jim Nantz, Tony Romo and Tracy Wolfson
- Recap, Gamebook

Game information

**First quarter**

- SEA – Nick Vannett 8-yard pass from Russell Wilson (Sebastian Janikowski kick), 11:16. Seahawks 7–0. **Drive: 7 plays, 75 yards, 3:44.**
- LAR – Gerald Everett 10-yard pass from Jared Goff (Greg Zuerlein kick), 6:41. Tied 7–7. **Drive: 10 plays, 86 yards, 4:35.**
- SEA – Rashaad Penny 18-yard run (Sebastian Janikowski kick), 3:42. Seahawks 14–7. **Drive: 5 plays, 75 yards, 2:59.**

**Second quarter**

- LAR – Greg Zuerlein 35-yard field goal, 14:48. Seahawks 14–10. **Drive: 9 plays, 58 yards, 3:54.**
- LAR – Todd Gurley 17-yard run (Greg Zuerlein kick), 2:48. Rams 17–14. **Drive: 9 plays, 86 yards, 4:43.**

**Third quarter**

- LAR – Greg Zuerlein 37-yard field goal, 9:44. Rams 20–14. **Drive: 10 plays, 56 yards, 5:16.**
- SEA – Tyler Lockett 23-yard pass from Russell Wilson (Sebastian Janikowski kick), 4:20. Seahawks 21–20. **Drive: 9 plays, 75 yards, 5:24.**

**Fourth quarter**

- LAR – Tyler Higbee 10-yard pass from Jared Goff (run failed), 14:54. Rams 26–21. **Drive: 9 plays, 75 yards, 4:26.**
- SEA – Sebastian Janikowski 33-yard field goal, 9:52. Rams 26–24. **Drive: 9 plays, 60 yards, 5:02.**
- LAR – Greg Zuerlein 20-yard field goal, 7:34. Rams 29–24. **Drive: 7 plays, 44 yards, 2:18.**
- LAR – Brandin Cooks 9-yard run (Greg Zuerlein kick), 5:49. Rams 36–24. **Drive: 1 plays, 9 yards, 0:06.**
- SEA – Mike Davis 3-yard pass from Russell Wilson (Sebastian Janikowski kick), 1:56. Rams 36–31. **Drive: 12 plays, 90 yards, 3:53.**

**Top passers**

- SEA – Russell Wilson – 17/26, 176 yards, 3 TD
- LAR – Jared Goff – 28/39, 318 yards, 2 TD

**Top rushers**

- SEA – Rashaad Penny – 12 carries, 108 yards, TD
- LAR – Todd Gurley – 16 carries, 120 yards, TD

**Top receivers**

- SEA – Tyler Lockett – 5 receptions, 67 yards, TD
- LAR – Brandin Cooks – 10 receptions, 100 yards

The Rams clinched back-to-back winning seasons for the first time since 2001 with a comeback victory over the Seahawks just four days after a shooting in Thousand Oaks near their training facility. Quarterback Jared Goff threw for 318 yards and touchdown passes to tight ends Gerald Everett and Tyler Higbee, with the second score putting the Rams ahead for good early in the fourth quarter. Todd Gurley had 16 carries for 120 yards and a touchdown to extend his team-record touchdown scoring streak to 13 straight games. Defensive tackle Aaron Donald earned 2.5 sacks, and newly-acquired linebacker Dante Fowler recorded a sack, forced fumble, and fumble recovery on the same play midway through the fourth quarter. One play later, wide receiver Brandin Cooks scored from nine yards out on a jet sweep for the Rams' final touchdown. Russell Wilson had three touchdown passes for the Seahawks, but threw four straight incompletions in the final minute as Los Angeles earned a season sweep of its NFC West rival and improved its record to 9-1. The victory was marred by the loss of Cooper Kupp, who suffered a torn ACL in the fourth quarter that would end his season.

==== Week 11: vs. Kansas City Chiefs ====
Week Eleven: Kansas City Chiefs at Los Angeles Rams – Game summary

Quarter	1	2	3	4	Total
Chiefs	7	16	7	21	**51**
**Rams**	13	10	17	14	**54**

at Los Angeles Memorial Coliseum, Los Angeles, California

- Date: November 19
- Game time: 5:15 pm. PST
- Game weather: 65 °F (18 °C), cloudy
- Game attendance: 77,002
- Referee: Clete Blakeman
- TV announcers (ESPN/KABC): Joe Tessitore, Jason Witten, Booger McFarland and Lisa Salters
- Recap, Gamebook

Game information

**First quarter**

- LAR – Brandin Cooks 7-yard pass from Jared Goff (Greg Zuerlein kick failed), 12:00. Rams 6–0. **Drive: 6 plays, 75 yards, 3:00.**
- LAR – Josh Reynolds 4-yard pass from Jared Goff (Greg Zuerlein kick), 5:35. Rams 13–0. **Drive: 10 plays, 83 yards, 4:21.**
- KC – Tyreek Hill 25-yard pass from Patrick Mahomes (Harrison Butker kick), 3:25. Rams 13–7. **Drive: 4 plays, 75 yards, 2:10.**

**Second quarter**

- LAR – Greg Zuerlein 23-yard field goal, 14:54. Rams 16–7. **Drive: 9 plays, 79 yards, 3:31.**
- KC – Harrison Butker 21-yard field goal, 8:04. Rams 16–10. **Drive: 11 plays, 73 yards, 6:50.**
- KC – Kareem Hunt 21-yard pass from Patrick Mahomes (Harrison Butker kick), 6:28. Chiefs 17–16. **Drive: 1 play, 21 yards, 0:09.**
- LAR – Samson Ebukam 11-yard fumble return (Greg Zuerlein kick), 1:50. Rams 23–17.
- KC – Chris Conley 8-yard pass from Patrick Mahomes (Harrison Butker kick failed), 0:21. Tied 23–23. **Drive: 7 plays, 69 yards, 1:37.**

**Third quarter**

- LAR – Jared Goff 7-yard run (Greg Zuerlein kick), 10:52. Rams 30–23. **Drive: 8 plays, 46 yards, 2:35.**
- KC – Travis Kelce 4-yard pass from Patrick Mahomes (Harrison Butker kick), 7:09. Tied 30–30. **Drive: 8 plays, 64 yards, 3:43.**
- LAR – Greg Zuerlein 33-yard field goal, 2:24. Rams 33–30. **Drive: 9 plays, 50 yards, 4:45.**
- LAR – Samson Ebukam 25-yard interception return (Greg Zuerlein kick), 2:14. Rams 40–30.

**Fourth quarter**

- KC – Tyreek Hill 73-yard pass from Patrick Mahomes (Harrison Butker kick), 12:04. Rams 40–37. **Drive: 3 plays, 91 yards, 1:28.**
- KC – Allen Bailey 2-yard fumble return (Harrison Butker kick), 11:07. Chiefs 44–40.
- LAR – Gerald Everett 7-yard pass from Jared Goff (Greg Zuerlein kick), 9:38. Rams 47–44. **Drive: 6 plays, 75 yards, 1:29.**
- KC – Chris Conley 10-yard pass from Patrick Mahomes (Harrison Butker kick), 2:47. Chiefs 51–47. **Drive: 8 plays, 65 yards, 3:46.**
- LAR – Gerald Everett 40-yard pass from Jared Goff (Greg Zuerlein kick), 1:49. Rams 54–51. **Drive: 6 plays, 75 yards, 0:58.**

**Top passers**

- KC – Patrick Mahomes – 33/46, 478 yards, 6 TD, 3 INT
- LAR – Jared Goff – 31/49, 413 yards, 4 TD

**Top rushers**

- KC – Kareem Hunt – 14 rushes, 70 yards
- LAR – Todd Gurley – 12 rushes, 55 yards

**Top receivers**

- KC – Tyreek Hill – 10 receptions, 215 yards, 2 TD
- LAR – Brandin Cooks – 8 receptions, 107 yards

Originally scheduled to be played in Mexico City as part of the NFL International Series, the game was relocated to Los Angeles due to poor field conditions at Estadio Azteca, with the Rams having maintained availability of the Los Angeles Memorial Coliseum as a contingency. Additionally, the game took place in the aftermath of the Thousand Oaks shooting on November 7, in which 12 people were killed in a mass shooting, and the Woolsey Fire which broke out a day later and ravaged areas close to the Rams' administrative offices and practice facility, forcing the evacuation of both. Victims of both tragedies as well as police, firefighters, and first responders were honored prior to the game. Rams players and coaching staff, who had already departed to Colorado Springs, Colorado in preparation for the high-altitude conditions they expected to face in Mexico City, remained in place and conducted closed practices at the Air Force Academy. Both teams entered the game with 9-1 records, with their combined marks of 18-2 being the second-best in the history of Monday Night Football.

The matchup lived up to its billing, as the Rams and Chiefs combined for 105 points and 1,001 yards in total offense. Rams quarterback Jared Goff completed 31 of 49 passes for 413 yards and four touchdowns, the last coming on a 40-yard pass to tight end Gerald Everett with just under two minutes remaining. Linebacker Samson Ebukam scored on both fumble recovery and interception returns as the Rams forced five turnovers and was named NFC Defensive Player of the Week. For the Chiefs, quarterback Patrick Mahomes set career highs for attempts (46), completions (33), passing yards (478) and tied a personal best with six touchdowns, but threw three interceptions, also a career high. Rams wide receiver Brandin Cooks led his team with eight receptions for 107 yards, while Chiefs wideout Tyreek Hill had 10 catches for 215 yards and two TDs in the game, which featured six lead changes, including four in the fourth quarter. The 105 total points and the 14 combined touchdowns scored by both teams tied for the second-most in league history in both categories. Only a 2004 matchup between the Cincinnati Bengals and Cleveland Browns (106 points, 58-48) and a 1966 game with the Washington Redskins and New York Giants (113 points, 72-41) exceeded the Rams-Chiefs combined point total.

==== Week 13: at Detroit Lions ====
Week Thirteen: Los Angeles Rams at Detroit Lions – Game summary

Quarter	1	2	3	4	Total
**Rams**	3	10	3	14	**30**
Lions	0	3	10	3	**16**

at Ford Field, Detroit, Michigan

- Date: December 2
- Game time: 10:00 am. PST/1:00 p.m. EST
- Game weather: Played indoors (dome stadium)
- Game attendance: 60,974
- Referee: John Parry
- TV announcers (Fox): Thom Brennaman, Chris Spielman, and Shannon Spake
- Recap, Gamebook

Game information

**First quarter**

- LAR – Greg Zuerlein 24-yard field goal, 3:20. **Drive:10 plays, 74 yards, 4:40.** Rams 3–0.

**Second quarter**

- DET – Matt Prater 28-yard field goal, 12:24. **Drive: 10 plays, 65 yards, 5:53.** Tied 3–3.
- LAR – Robert Woods pass from Jared Goff for 8 yards (Greg Zuerlein kick), 2:28. **Drive: 12 plays, 71 yards, 6:09.** Rams 10–3.
- LAR – Greg Zuerlein 47 yard field goal, 0:48. **Drive: 6 plays, 39 yards, 0:50.** Rams 13–3.

**Third quarter**

- DET – Matt Prater 29 yard field goal, 7:56. **Drive: 9 plays, 36 yards, 5:25.** Rams 13–6.
- LAR – Greg Zuerlein 48 yard field goal, 5:51. **Drive: 4 plays, 8 yards, 2:10.** Rams 16–6.
- DET – Taylor Decker pass from Matthew Stafford for 11 yards (Matt Prater kick), 3:02. **Drive: 10 plays, 24 yards, 5:18.** Rams 16–13.

**Fourth quarter**

- LAR – Todd Gurley 13-yard rush (Greg Zuerlein kick), 6:53. **Drive: 3 plays, 24 yards, 1:20.** Rams 23–13.
- DET – Matt Prater 35 yard field goal, 2:57. **Drive: 8 plays, 58 yards, 3:59.** Rams 23–16.
- LAR – Todd Gurley 2 yard rush (Greg Zuerlein kick), 1:54. **Drive: 5 plays, 45 yards, 1:00.** Rams 30–16.

**Top passers**

- LAR – Jared Goff – 17/33, 207 yards, TD, INT
- DET – Matthew Stafford – 20/33, 245 yards, TD, INT

**Top rushers**

- LAR – Todd Gurley – 23 carries, 132 yards, 2 TD
- DET – LeGarrette Blount – 16 carries, 61 yards

**Top receivers**

- LAR – Robert Woods – 5 receptions, 67 yards, TD
- DET – Levine Toilolo – 4 receptions, 90 yards

Todd Gurley ran for 132 yards on 23 carries and scored two touchdowns in the fourth quarter as the Rams pulled away from the host Lions to clinch their second straight NFC West Division title. Coming off their bye week, the Rams got off to a slow start and did not take a significant lead until late in the second quarter, when Greg Zuerlein kicked his second field goal, a 47-yarder, to give the Rams a 13-3 lead at halftime. In the third quarter, the Lions closed to within three points. Defensive tackle Aaron Donald had two sacks of Lions quarterback Matthew Stafford in the fourth quarter, stripping him of the ball on the second sack, with the fumble being recovered by linebacker Samson Ebukam. Three plays later, Gurley ran into the end zone for a 13-yard touchdown. Following Matt Prater's third field goal of the game to bring the Lions back to within a touchdown, Blake Countess recovered Detroit's onside kick attempt at the Lion 45. Facing a third-and-3 at the Lion 38 with 2:44 remaining in the game, Gurley broke loose for a 36-yard run, his longest of the season. With no one between him and the end zone, Gurley instead veered to his right and allowed himself to be tackled two yards short of the goal line. By not scoring, he forced Detroit to use its final time out before the two-minute warning. Two plays later, Gurley finally reached the end zone a second time to give the Rams a 30-16 lead. He was later named NFC Offensive Player of the Week for the second time this season. Cornerback Troy Hill intercepted a Stafford pass in the final seconds to seal the victory, which gave the Rams at least 11 victories for the second year in a row. Strong safety John Johnson again led the team with 11 tackles, while cornerback Aqib Talib saw his first action since September, starting the game and playing about one-third of the defensive snaps. On offense, Robert Woods had five receptions for 67 yards and a touchdown, while Brandin Cooks had four catches for 62 yards to give him 1,026 yards for the season. Cooks became the first receiver to ever record three consecutive 1,000-yard seasons with three different teams (having played for New Orleans in 2016 and New England in 2017).

==== Week 14: at Chicago Bears ====
Week Fourteen: Los Angeles Rams at Chicago Bears – Game summary

Quarter	1	2	3	4	Total
Rams	3	3	0	0	**6**
**Bears**	3	3	9	0	**15**

at Soldier Field, Chicago, Illinois

- Date: December 9
- Game time: 7:20 pm. CST/5:20 pm. PST
- Game weather: 29 °F (−2 °C), cloudy
- Game attendance: 61,695
- Referee: Craig Wrolstad
- TV announcers (NBC): Al Michaels, Cris Collinsworth and Michele Tafoya
- Recap, Gamebook

Game information

**First quarter**

- LAR – Greg Zuerlein 27-yard field goal, 9:12. Rams 3–0. **Drive: 4 plays, 6 yards, 1:35.**
- CHI – Cody Parkey 39-yard field goal, 2:48. Tied 3–3. **Drive: 12 plays, 54 yards, 6:24.**

**Second quarter**

- CHI – Cody Parkey 31-yard field goal, 9:24. Bears 6–3. **Drive: 4 plays, 6 yards, 1:40.**
- LAR – Greg Zuerlein 50-yard field goal, 4:12. Tied 6–6. **Drive: 13 plays, 43 yards, 5:12.**

**Third quarter**

- CHI – Jared Goff sacked in end zone by Eddie Goldman for a safety, 14:14. Bears 8–6.
- CHI – Bradley Sowell 2-yard pass from Mitchell Trubisky (Cody Parkey kick), 9:58. Bears 15–6. **Drive: 9 plays, 81 yards, 4:16.**

**Fourth quarter**

- No scoring plays.

**Top passers**

- LAR – Jared Goff – 20/44, 180 yards, 4 INT
- CHI – Mitchell Trubisky – 16/30, 110 yards, TD, 3 INT

**Top rushers**

- LAR – Todd Gurley – 11 carries, 28 yards
- CHI – Jordan Howard – 19 carries, 101 yards

**Top receivers**

- LAR – Robert Woods – 7 receptions, 61 yards
- CHI – Allen Robinson – 5 receptions, 42 yards

Jared Goff threw a career-high four interceptions, and the Rams were held without a touchdown for the first time in the Sean McVay era in a loss to the host Bears on Sunday Night Football at Soldier Field. Los Angeles totaled only 214 offensive yards, less than half their season average, as the Bears controlled the clock 36:49 to 23:11. The Rams' only points came off two field goals by Greg Zuerlein in the first half. Wide receiver Robert Woods led the Rams with seven receptions for 61 yards to put him over 1,000 yards receiving for the first time in his career. Lamarcus Joyner led the team with seven tackles, while Marcus Peters, Nickell Robey-Coleman and John Johnson each had interceptions. With the loss, the Rams fell to 11-2.

==== Week 15: vs. Philadelphia Eagles ====
Week Fifteen: Philadelphia Eagles at Los Angeles Rams – Game summary

Quarter	1	2	3	4	Total
**Eagles**	3	10	17	0	**30**
Rams	7	6	0	10	**23**

at Los Angeles Memorial Coliseum, Los Angeles, California

- Date: December 16
- Game time: 5:20 pm. PST
- Game weather: 60 °F (16 °C), cloudy
- Game attendance: 74,210
- Referee: Bill Vinovich
- TV announcers (NBC): Al Michaels, Cris Collinsworth and Michele Tafoya
- Recap, Gamebook

Game information

**First quarter**

- PHI – Jake Elliott 51-yard field goal, 8:35. Eagles 3–0. **Drive: 9 plays, 43 yards, 4:49.**
- LAR – Todd Gurley 5-yard rush (Greg Zuerlein kick), 1:16. Rams 7–3. **Drive: 13 plays, 80 yards, 7:19.**

**Second quarter**

- PHI – Jake Elliott 34-yard field goal, 12:00. Rams 7–6. **Drive: 10 plays, 59 yards, 4:16.**
- LAR – Greg Zuerlein 41-yard field goal, 4:38. Rams 10–6. **Drive: 8 plays, 28 yards, 4:51.**
- PHI – Josh Adams 6-yard rush (Jake Elliott kick), 1:07. Eagles 13–10. **Drive: 9 plays, 75 yards, 3:31.**
- LAR – Greg Zuerlein 36-yard field goal, 0:00. Tied 13–13. **Drive: 10 plays, 57 yards, 1:07.**

**Third quarter**

- PHI – Wendell Smallwood 9-yard rush (Jake Elliott kick), 10:28. Eagles 20–13. **Drive: 2 plays, 59 yards, 0:46.**
- PHI – Jake Elliott 40-yard field goal, 3:11. Eagles 23–13. **Drive: 10 plays, 52 yards, 5:56.**
- PHI – Wendell Smallwood 4-yard rush (Jake Elliott kick), 1:34. Eagles 30–13. **Drive: 2 plays, 12 yards, 0:38.**

**Fourth quarter**

- LAR – Greg Zuerlein 37-yard field goal, 9:24. Eagles 30–16. **Drive: 10 plays, 46 yards, 4:45.**
- LAR – Todd Gurley 1-yard rush (Greg Zuerlein kick), 4:06. Eagles 30–23. **Drive: 11 plays, 84 yards, 2:12.**

**Top passers**

- PHI – Nick Foles – 24/31, 270 yards, INT
- LAR – Jared Goff – 35/54, 339 yards, 2 INT

**Top rushers**

- PHI – Wendell Smallwood – 10 carries, 48 yards, 2 TD
- LAR – Todd Gurley – 12 carries, 48 yards, 2 TD

**Top receivers**

- PHI – Alshon Jeffery – 8 receptions, 160 yards
- LAR – Todd Gurley – 10 receptions, 76 yards

Despite being 13.5-point favorites entering this game, Sean McVay lost consecutive games for the first time as head coach as the Rams fell to the Eagles for the second straight season. Jared Goff passed for 339 yards and set career single-game highs in completions (35) and attempts (54), but had two interceptions, one of which led directly to a Philadelphia touchdown. The Eagles held the Rams without a first down and scored 17 unanswered points during a decisive third quarter in staking out a 30-13 lead. At the beginning of the fourth quarter, Philadelphia drove inside the Rams 20 and were poised to add to their lead when cornerback Aqib Talib picked off a Nick Foles pass and returned it 30 yards. That sparked a drive that ended with a 37-yard field goal by Greg Zuerlein. After forcing an Eagles punt, the Rams drove again with Goff connecting with wide receiver Josh Reynolds on a 33-yard pass to set up a first-and-goal at the Philadelphia 1. Two plays later, Todd Gurley (12 carries, 48 yards/10 receptions, 76 yards) scored his second touchdown of the game and 21st of the season. Following a missed field goal by the Eagles, the Rams mounted a drive in the final minute with no timeouts remaining. Goff drove the Rams down to the Eagles 18-yard-line, but a pass to Reynolds in the end zone fell incomplete as time expired, and L.A.'s record dropped to 11-3. Strong safety John Johnson had a team-high 14 tackles (11 solo), but the defense was held without a sack for only the second time in the season.

==== Week 16: at Arizona Cardinals ====
Week Sixteen: Los Angeles Rams at Arizona Cardinals – Game summary

Quarter	1	2	3	4	Total
**Rams**	7	14	3	7	**31**
Cardinals	3	6	0	0	**9**

at State Farm Stadium, Glendale, Arizona

- Date: December 23
- Game time: 1:05 pm. PST/2:05 pm. MST
- Game weather: 72 °F (22 °C), sunny – retractable roof open
- Game attendance: 61,759
- Referee: Walt Coleman
- TV announcers (Fox): Kevin Burkhardt, Charles Davis and Pam Oliver
- Recap, Gamebook

Game information

**First quarter**

- ARI – Zane Gonzalez 36-yard field goal, 7:07. Cardinals 3–0. **Drive: 8 plays, 23 yards, 4:58.**
- LAR – Robert Woods 4-yard rush (Greg Zuerlein kick), 3:59. Rams 7–3. **Drive: 7 plays, 75 yards, 3:08.**

**Second quarter**

- LAR – Jared Goff 1-yard rush (Greg Zuerlein kick), 11:56. Rams 14–3. **Drive: 11 plays, 84 yards, 5:29.**
- ARI – David Johnson 32-yard pass from Larry Fitzgerald (kick failed kick), 9:40. Rams 14–9. **Drive: 5 plays, 75 yards, 2:16.**
- LAR – C. J. Anderson 4-yard rush (Greg Zuerlein kick), 2:10. Rams 21–9. **Drive: 12 plays, 75 yards, 7:30.**

**Third quarter**

- LAR – Greg Zuerlein 21-yard field goal, 5:37. Rams 24–9. **Drive: 11 plays, 86 yards, 6:15.**

**Fourth quarter**

- LAR – Robert Woods 39-yard pass from Jared Goff (Greg Zuerlein kick), 9:19. Rams 31–9. **Drive: 4 plays, 95 yards, 2:15.**

**Top passers**

- LAR – Jared Goff – 19/24, 216 yards, 1 TD
- ARI – Josh Rosen – 12/23, 87 yards

**Top rushers**

- LAR – C. J. Anderson – 20 carries, 167 yards
- ARI – Josh Rosen – 4 carries, 49 yards

**Top receivers**

- LAR – Robert Woods – 6 receptions, 89 yards, 1 TD
- ARI – Trent Sherfield – 6 receptions, 62 yards

Signed to the Rams roster just five days earlier, running back C. J. Anderson was inserted into the starting lineup after Todd Gurley was declared inactive 90 minutes before gametime due to knee inflammation. The former Pro Bowler with the Denver Broncos proceeded to run 20 times for 167 yards to lead Los Angeles to a convincing fourth straight win over the host Cardinals. Anderson also scored on a 4-yard touchdown run late in the second quarter as the Rams built a 21-9 halftime lead. Jared Goff passed for 216 yards, including a 39-yard scoring pass to Robert Woods in the fourth quarter to seal the victory. Goff also scored on a 1-yard run early in the second quarter. Woods caught a team-high six passes for 89 yards, while also scoring the first rushing touchdown of his career on a 4-yard sweep in the first period. On defense, Aaron Donald had three sacks of Arizona quarterback Josh Rosen to increase his league-leading sack total to 19.5, and he was named NFC Defensive Player of the Week for the second time in the season and the fifth time in his career. Donald also set a new modern standard for defensive tackles, breaking the previous mark of 18.0 set in 1989 by Keith Millard of the Minnesota Vikings, while also surpassing former teammate Robert Quinn's modern-era club mark of 19.0 established during the 2013 St. Louis Rams season.

==== Week 17: vs. San Francisco 49ers ====
Week Seventeen: San Francisco 49ers at Los Angeles Rams – Game summary

Quarter	1	2	3	4	Total
49ers	3	7	7	15	**32**
**Rams**	14	17	14	3	**48**

at Los Angeles Memorial Coliseum, Los Angeles, California

- Date: December 30
- Game time: 1:25 pm. PST
- Game weather: 65 °F (18 °C), sunny
- Game attendance: 72,161
- Referee: Jerome Boger
- TV announcers (Fox): Thom Brennaman, Chris Spielman and Shannon Spake
- Recap, Gamebook

Game information

**First quarter**

- LAR – Brandin Cooks 3-yard pass from Jared Goff (Greg Zuerlein kick), 11:57. Rams 7–0. **Drive: 3 plays, 7 yards, 1:08.**
- LAR – C. J. Anderson 1-yard run (Greg Zuerlein kick), 10:42. Rams 14–0. **Drive: 2 plays, 13 yards, 0:19.**
- SF – Robbie Gould 30-yard field goal, 2:11. Rams 14–3. **Drive: 5 plays, 58 yards, 2:29.**

**Second quarter**

- LAR – Cory Littleton 19-yard interception return (Greg Zuerlein kick), 12:37. Rams 21–3.
- LAR – Brandin Cooks 18-yard pass from Jared Goff (Greg Zuerlein kick), 6:00. Rams 28–3. **Drive: 11 plays, 86 yards, 5:10.**
- SF – Richie James 9-yard pass from Nick Mullens (Robbie Gould kick), 2:07. Rams 28–10. **Drive: 8 plays, 75 yards, 3:53.**
- LAR – Greg Zuerlein 28-yard field goal, 0:00. Rams 31–10. **Drive: 13 plays, 65 yards, 2:07.**

**Third quarter**

- LAR – Josh Reynolds 29-yard pass from Jared Goff (Greg Zuerlein kick), 12:19. Rams 38–10. **Drive: 5 plays, 75 yards, 2:41.**
- SF – Alfred Morris 1-yard run (Greg Zuerlein kick), 8:23. Rams 38–17. **Drive: 8 plays, 75 yards, 3:56.**
- LAR – Josh Reynolds 2-yard pass from Jared Goff (Greg Zuerlein kick), 11:57. Rams 45–17. **Drive: 9 plays, 75 yards, 5:25.**

**Fourth quarter**

- LAR – Greg Zuerlein 51-yard field goal, 11:44. Rams 48–17. **Drive: 7 plays, 19 yards, 3:41.**
- SF – Kendrick Bourne 2-yard pass from Nick Mullens (Robbie Gould kick), 6:54. Rams 48–24. **Drive: 9 plays, 75 yards, 4:50.**
- SF – George Kittle 43-yard pass from Nick Mullens (Nick Mullens-Trent Taylor pass), 2:20. Rams 48–32. **Drive: 2 plays, 49 yards, 0:17.**

**Top passers**

- SF – Nick Mullens – 23/33, 282 yards, 3 TD, 3 INT
- LAR – Jared Goff – 15/26, 199 yards, 4 TD

**Top rushers**

- SF – Alfred Morris – 16 carries, 111 yards, TD
- LAR – C. J. Anderson – 23 carries, 132 yards, TD

**Top receivers**

- SF – George Kittle – 9 receptions, 149 yards, TD
- LAR – Brandin Cooks – 5 receptions, 62 yards, 2 TD

The Rams defense recorded four turnovers (including two interceptions by linebacker Cory Littleton) in the first half to help build a 31-10 halftime lead as Los Angeles secured a first round bye with the regular season-ending victory. Cornerback Aqib Talib picked up a fumble on the 49ers' opening possession, and Littleton intercepted a Nick Mullens pass on the next. Both turnovers were returned inside the 49er 20 to set up Rams touchdowns. Early in the second quarter, Littleton picked off his second pass of the day and returned it 19 yards for a score. The defense collected three sacks, with defensive tackle Aaron Donald getting one to end his season as the NFL's leader in quarterback sacks with 20.5, though he ultimately fell short of the NFL single season record of 22.5. Offensively, the Rams went turnover-free for the first time in six games, as quarterback Jared Goff threw for 199 yards and four touchdowns, two each to wide receivers Brandin Cooks and Josh Reynolds, while C. J. Anderson totaled 23 carries for 132 yards and a touchdown in relief of Todd Gurley, who sat out a second straight game. Greg Zuerlein added two field goals for the Rams, who swept the NFC West for the first time since their 1999 Super Bowl-winning season and equaled their win total from that year.

=== Standings ===
==== Division ====
NFC West
	W	L	T	PCT	DIV	CONF	PF	PA	STK
^{(2)} Los Angeles Rams	13	3	0	.813	6–0	9–3	527	384	W2
^{(5)} Seattle Seahawks	10	6	0	.625	3–3	8–4	428	347	W2
San Francisco 49ers	4	12	0	.250	1–5	2–10	342	435	L2
Arizona Cardinals	3	13	0	.188	2–4	3–9	225	425	L4

==== Conference ====
NFC
#	Team	Division	W	L	T	PCT	DIV	CONF	SOS	SOV	STK
**Division leaders**
1 (Note: New Orleans finished ahead of LA Rams based on head-to-head victory, claiming the No. 1 seed.)	New Orleans Saints	South	13	3	0	.813	4–2	9–3	.482	.488	L1
2	Los Angeles Rams	West	13	3	0	.813	6–0	9–3	.480	.428	W2
3	Chicago Bears	North	12	4	0	.750	5–1	10–2	.430	.419	W4
4	Dallas Cowboys	East	10	6	0	.625	5–1	9–3	.488	.444	W2
**Wild Cards**
5	Seattle Seahawks	West	10	6	0	.625	3–3	8–4	.484	.400	W2
6	Philadelphia Eagles	East	9	7	0	.563	4–2	6–6	.518	.486	W3
**Did not qualify for the postseason**
7	Minnesota Vikings	North	8	7	1	.531	3–2–1	6–5–1	.504	.355	L1
8 (Note: Atlanta finished ahead of Washington based on head-to-head victory. Atlanta finished ahead of Carolina based on head-to-head sweep. Washington finished ahead of Carolina based on head-to-head victory.)	Atlanta Falcons	South	7	9	0	.438	4–2	7–5	.482	.348	W3
9	Washington Redskins	East	7	9	0	.438	2–4	6–6	.486	.371	L2
10	Carolina Panthers	South	7	9	0	.438	2–4	5–7	.508	.518	W1
11	Green Bay Packers	North	6	9	1	.406	1–4–1	3–8–1	.488	.417	L1
12	Detroit Lions	North	6	10	0	.375	2–4	4–8	.504	.427	W1
13 (Note: NY Giants finished ahead of Tampa Bay based on head-to-head victory.)	New York Giants	East	5	11	0	.313	1–5	4–8	.527	.487	L3
14	Tampa Bay Buccaneers	South	5	11	0	.313	2–4	4–8	.523	.506	L4
15	San Francisco 49ers	West	4	12	0	.250	1–5	2–10	.504	.406	L2
16	Arizona Cardinals	West	3	13	0	.188	2–4	3–9	.527	.302	L4
**Tiebreakers** (Note: When breaking ties for three or more teams under the NFL's rules, they are first broken within divisions, then comparing only the highest-ranked remaining team from each division.)

== Postseason ==
Round	Date	Opponent (seed)	Result	Record	Venue	Recap
Wild Card	First-round bye					
Divisional	January 12, 2019	Dallas Cowboys (4)	W 30–22	1–0	Los Angeles Memorial Coliseum	Recap
NFC Championship	January 20, 2019	at New Orleans Saints (1)	W 26–23 (OT)	2–0	Mercedes-Benz Superdome	Recap
Super Bowl LIII	February 3, 2019	vs. New England Patriots (A2)	L 3–13	2–1	Mercedes-Benz Stadium	Recap

=== NFC Divisional Playoffs: vs. (4) Dallas Cowboys ===
NFC Divisional Playoffs: (4) Dallas Cowboys at (2) Los Angeles Rams – Game summary

Quarter	1	2	3	4	Total
Cowboys	7	0	8	7	22
Rams	3	17	3	7	30

at Los Angeles Memorial Coliseum, Los Angeles, California

- Date: January 12, 2019
- Game time: 5:15 p.m. PST
- Game weather: 57 °F (14 °C), rain
- Game attendance: 77,187
- Referee: John Parry
- TV announcers (Fox): Joe Buck, Troy Aikman, Erin Andrews and Chris Myers
- Recap, Gamebook

Game information

First quarter

- LAR – Greg Zuerlein 25-yard field goal, 9:44. Rams 3–0. Drive: 11 plays, 68 yards, 5:16.
- DAL – Amari Cooper 29-yard pass from Dak Prescott (Brett Maher kick), 6:03. Cowboys 7–3. Drive: 7 plays, 71 yards, 3:41.

Second quarter

- LAR – Greg Zuerlein 23-yard field goal, 13:40. Cowboys 7–6. Drive: 16 plays, 70 yards, 7:23.
- LAR – C. J. Anderson 1-yard run (Greg Zuerlein kick), 7:00. Rams 13–7. Drive: 9 plays, 76 yards, 4:20.
- LAR – Todd Gurley 35-yard run (Greg Zuerlein kick), 3:27. Rams 20–7. Drive: 6 plays, 64 yards, 2:38.

Third quarter

- LAR – Greg Zuerlein 44-yard field goal, 10:03. Rams 23–7. Drive: 8 plays, 48 yards, 4:04.
- DAL – Ezekiel Elliott 1-yard run (Dak Prescott–Amari Cooper pass), 5:20. Rams 23–15. Drive: 9 plays, 75 yards, 4:43.

Fourth quarter

- LAR – C. J. Anderson 1-yard run (Greg Zuerlein kick), 7:16. Rams 30–15. Drive: 12 plays, 65 yards, 7:36.
- DAL – Dak Prescott 1-yard run (Brett Maher kick), 2:11. Rams 30–22. Drive: 12 plays, 75 yards, 5:05.

Top passers

- DAL – Dak Prescott – 20/32, 266 yards, TD
- LAR – Jared Goff – 15/28, 186 yards

Top rushers

- DAL – Ezekiel Elliott – 20 rushes, 47 yards, TD
- LAR – C. J. Anderson – 23 rushes, 123 yards, 2 TD

Top receivers

- DAL – Michael Gallup – 6 receptions, 119 yards
- LAR – Robert Woods – 6 receptions, 69 yards

On the second anniversary of his hiring as Los Angeles Rams head coach, Sean McVay won his first career playoff game as L.A. dominated both sides of the line of scrimmage to defeat Dallas and advance to the NFC Championship for the 10th time in franchise history. This was the ninth playoff meeting between the Rams and the Cowboys, more than any teams in NFL history, but the first time since 1985. C. J. Anderson ran for 123 yards on 23 carries with two touchdowns and Todd Gurley rushed 16 times for 115 yards and a score as the Rams totaled a whopping 273 yards on 48 rushing attempts. It was the 10th time in franchise history that two players had each rushed for over 100 yards in the same game, but the first time ever in a playoff game. The Rams began the game with a pair of long drives, both of which ended in Greg Zuerlein field goals. With the Cowboys leading 7-6 midway through the second quarter, L.A. went to work as both Anderson and Gurley ran effectively against a Dallas defense that was among the league's best against the run. Each scored a touchdown in the second period as L.A. took a 20-7 halftime lead. On defense, the Rams swarmed Cowboys running back Ezekiel Elliott, holding the NFL's rushing leader to just 47 yards on 20 carries. Clinging to a 23-15 lead at the beginning of the fourth quarter, the Rams defense stuffed Elliott for no gain on a 4th-and-1 play at the Ram 35. From there, Los Angeles went 65 yards in 12 plays before Anderson ended it with his second touchdown of the game. Dallas answered with a touchdown run by Dak Prescott just before the two-minute warning, and hoped to hold the Rams to a punt on the next possession. But on 3rd-and-7 at his own 28, Rams quarterback Jared Goff faked a handoff, rolled out to his right and ran 11 yards for the game-clinching first down. The Rams franchise won its first playoff game since a 27-20 victory over the Seattle Seahawks in the 2004 season, and it was the first time since the 1978 season that the Rams won a home playoff game at the Los Angeles Memorial Coliseum (a 34-10 win over the Minnesota Vikings), and their first home playoff victory at the Coliseum against the Cowboys after having lost in NFC Championship games there twice against Dallas to end the 1975 and 1978 seasons. John Johnson, Cory Littleton and Aqib Talib shared the team lead in tackles with seven each, and combined the Rams had six total tackles for loss, including a sack credited to Dante Fowler. Rams go the NFC Championship Game to win to the Saints 26-23. But lost in Super Bowl LIII to the New England Patriots 13-3.

=== NFC Championship: at (1) New Orleans Saints ===
NFC Championship: (2) Los Angeles Rams at (1) New Orleans Saints – Game summary

Quarter	1	2	3	4	OT	Total
Rams	0	10	7	6	3	26
Saints	13	0	7	3	0	23

at Mercedes-Benz Superdome, New Orleans, Louisiana

- Date: January 20, 2019
- Game time: 2:05 p.m. CST/12:05 pm. PST
- Game weather: Played indoors (dome stadium)
- Game attendance: 73,028
- Referee: Bill Vinovich
- TV announcers (Fox): Joe Buck, Troy Aikman, Erin Andrews and Chris Myers
- Recap, Gamebook

Game information

First quarter

- NO – Wil Lutz 37-yard field goal, 10:04. Saints 3–0. Drive: 11 plays, 56 yards, 4:56.
- NO – Wil Lutz 29-yard field goal, 7:06. Saints 6–0. Drive: 4 plays, 6 yards, 1:29.
- NO – Garrett Griffin 5-yard pass from Drew Brees (Wil Lutz kick), 1:35. Saints 13–0. Drive: 8 plays, 68 yards, 3:51.

Second quarter

- LAR – Greg Zuerlein 36-yard field goal, 9:45. Saints 13–3. Drive: 14 plays, 57 yards, 6:50.
- LAR – Todd Gurley 6-yard run (Greg Zuerlein kick), 0:23. Saints 13–10. Drive: 7 plays, 81 yards, 1:29.

Third quarter

- NO – Taysom Hill 2-yard pass from Drew Brees (Wil Lutz kick), 8:34. Saints 20–10. Drive: 12 plays, 71 yards, 5:31.
- LAR – Tyler Higbee 1-yard pass from Jared Goff (Greg Zuerlein kick), 3:06. Saints 20–17. Drive: 10 plays, 75 yards, 5:28.

Fourth quarter

- LAR – Greg Zuerlein 24-yard field goal, 5:03. Tied 20–20. Drive: 9 plays, 85 yards, 5:52.
- NO – Wil Lutz 31-yard field goal, 1:41. Saints 23–20. Drive: 9 plays, 57 yards, 3:22.
- LAR – Greg Zuerlein 48-yard field goal, 0:15. Tied 23–23. Drive: 9 plays, 45 yards, 1:26.

Overtime

- LAR - Greg Zuerlein 57-yard field goal, 11:47. Rams 26–23. Drive: 5 plays, 15 yards, 2:12.

Top passers

- LAR – Jared Goff – 25/40, 297 yards, TD, INT
- NO – Drew Brees – 26/40, 249 yards, 2 TD, INT

Top rushers

- LAR – C. J. Anderson – 16 rushes, 44 yards
- NO – Mark Ingram II – 9 rushes, 31 yards

Top receivers

- LAR – Brandin Cooks – 7 receptions, 107 yards
- NO – Alvin Kamara – 11 receptions, 96 yards

Kicker Greg Zuerlein converted four field goals, the last coming from 57 yards out with 11:47 remaining in overtime to lift the Rams over the host Saints for the NFC Championship and into the Super Bowl for the fourth time in franchise history. A matchup that featured the NFC's two most prolific offenses turned into a defensive battle, with both teams being held well below their season averages in total offense and points. New Orleans scored field goals on its first two drives (the second coming after an interception on a tipped ball) and Drew Brees ended the Saints' third drive of the quarter with a 5-yard TD pass to tight end Garrett Griffin to give New Orleans a 13-0 first quarter lead. The Rams' offense sputtered early, held to just 10 yards in nine plays and no first downs in the first period, but got a spark when Johnny Hekker tossed a 12-yard pass to Sam Shields on a fake punt that eventually led to a 36-yard field goal by Zuerlein with 9:49 left in the second quarter. With less than two minutes remaining in the second quarter and starting at their own 19, Rams quarterback Jared Goff completed four of six pass attempts, the last going 36 yards to wide receiver Brandin Cooks down to the New Orleans 6. From there, Gurley scored with 28 seconds left before halftime to bring the Rams within three points 13-10. After Brees threw his second touchdown pass to put the Saints up by 10 points, Goff completed six straight passes on an 11-play, 75-yard drive, the last a 1-yard scoring strike to tight end Tyler Higbee. Midway through the fourth quarter, the Rams mounted their strongest drive of the game, driving from their own 9 to the Saints 1-yard line before settling for a 24-yard field goal from Zuerlein with 5:06 remaining to tie the game at 20-20. Brees and the Saints rallied to push deep into Rams territory, but the drive stalled at the Rams 13-yard-line, where Wil Lutz kicked his third field goal of the game with 1:45 remaining. During the drive, Rams cornerback Nickell Robey-Coleman committed a pass interference that went uncalled; had it been called, the Saints would have been in a better position to seal the game with a touchdown. Goff then drove the Rams to the New Orleans 30 to set up Zuerlein's successful 48-yard field goal with 19 seconds remaining to send the game into overtime. The Saints won the toss and elected to receive, but Brees was forced into three incompletions, and on his third attempt, as he threw, he was hit by Rams linebacker Dante Fowler and the wobbly pass was intercepted by Rams strong safety John Johnson. Goff completed two key passes to Higbee while under heavy pressure to reach the New Orleans 39. From there, Hekker handled a low snap and Zuerlein's kick sailed through the uprights to stun the home crowd at the Mercedes-Benz Superdome. It was the longest game-winning kick in NFL playoff history. Goff completed 25 of 40 passes for 297 yards with a touchdown and an interception, while Cooks led the Rams with seven receptions for 107 yards against the team that had originally drafted him. Josh Reynolds added four receptions for 74 yards and ran 16 yards to set up a Rams touchdown. C. J. Anderson ran 16 times for 44 yards to lead Los Angeles on the ground, while Gurley played sparingly and finished with only 10 yards rushing (13 yards total offense) and a touchdown. On defense, Cory Littleton had 12 tackles (11 solo) and Ndamukong Suh had four tackles, including 1.5 sacks to lead L.A. Rams go on to Super Bowl LIII but lost to the Patriots 13-3.

=== Super Bowl LIII: vs. (A2) New England Patriots ===
Super Bowl LIII: (A2) New England Patriots vs. (N2) Los Angeles Rams – Game summary

Quarter	1	2	3	4	Total
Patriots	0	3	0	10	13
Rams	0	0	3	0	3

at Mercedes-Benz Stadium, Atlanta, Georgia

- Date: February 3, 2019
- Game time: 6:30 p.m. EST/3:30 pm. PST
- Game weather: Played indoors (retractable roof closed)
- Game attendance: 70,081
- Referee: John Parry
- TV announcers (CBS): Jim Nantz, Tony Romo, Tracy Wolfson, Evan Washburn and Jay Feely
- Recap, Gamebook

Game information

Second quarter

- NE – Stephen Gostkowski 42-yard field goal, 10:29. Patriots 3–0. Drive: 7 plays, 39 yards, 3:29.

Third quarter

- LAR – Greg Zuerlein 53-yard field goal, 2:11. Tied 3–3. Drive: 10 plays, 42 yards, 4:22.

Fourth quarter

- NE – Sony Michel 2-yard run, 7:00. Patriots 10-3. Drive: 5 plays, 69 yards, 2:49.
- NE – Stephen Gostkowski 41-yard field goal, 1:12. Patriots 13–3. Drive: 9 plays, 72 yards, 3:05.

Top passers

- NE – Tom Brady – 21/35, 262 yards, 0 TD, 1 INT
- LAR – Jared Goff – 19/38, 229 yards, 0 TD, 1 INT

Top rushers

- NE – Sony Michel – 18 rushes, 94 yards
- LAR – Todd Gurley – 10 rushes, 35 yards

Top receivers

- NE – Julian Edelman – 10 receptions, 141 yards
- LAR – Brandin Cooks – 8 receptions, 120 yards

Playing in a hard-fought defensive struggle that resulted in the lowest-scoring Super Bowl in league history, the Rams were unable to prevent the Patriots from claiming their sixth NFL championship. On the opening possession, linebacker Cory Littleton intercepted a deflected pass from Tom Brady, but the Rams' offense was unable to get into rhythm as they punted eight straight times. Neither team was able to reach the red zone through the first three quarters, with Stephen Gostkowski putting New England into the lead with a 42-yard field goal just over three minutes before halftime. Greg Zuerlein evened the score with a 53-yard field goal with 2:11 left in the third quarter. The Patriots did not break through until seven minutes remained in the fourth quarter when running back Sony Michel scored on a 2-yard run (it was the only time that either team penetrated the red zone in the game). The Rams responded with one of their most effective drives, reaching the New England 27. From there, Rams quarterback Jared Goff tried to connect with wide receiver Brandin Cooks, who was unable to gather in the end zone pass under heavy coverage by Patriots cornerback Stephon Gilmore. Goff went back to Cooks on the next play, but this time Gilmore was there to make the interception at the New England 4. The Patriots then sealed the game, driving 72 yards in nine plays before Gostkowski added his second field goal of this game, this one from 41 yards out with 1:12 remaining. Los Angeles drove to the New England 30 on its final possession, but with four seconds left, Zuerlein missed on a 48-yard field goal attempt. Goff completed 19 of 38 passes for 229 yards, including an interception while being sacked four times. New England's defense disrupted L.A.'s offensive line, as neither Todd Gurley (10 carries, 35 yards) nor C. J. Anderson (seven carries, 22 yards) were effective against the Patriots. Brandin Cooks led the Rams with eight receptions for 120 yards, as Los Angeles tied with the 1971 Miami Dolphins for the fewest points scored by a single team in Super Bowl history. Defensively, Littleton led the Rams with six tackles and an interception. Midway through the third quarter, Rams punter Johnny Hekker booted a 65-yard punt, the longest punt in Super Bowl history. Rams lose this game and in 2019 missed the playoffs the first time since 2016.

== Awards and honors ==
Recipient	Award(s)
Greg Zuerlein	Week 1: NFC Special Teams Player of the Week
Blake Countess	Week 3: NFC Special Teams Player of the Week
Jared Goff	Week 4: NFC Offensive Player of the Week; September: NFC Offensive Player of the Month
Todd Gurley	Week 6: NFC Offensive Player of the Week; Week 6: FedEx Ground Player of the Week; October: NFC Offensive Player of the Month; Week 13: NFC Offensive Player of the Week
Aaron Donald	Week 7: NFC Defensive Player of the Week; October: NFC Defensive Player of the Month; Week 16: NFC Defensive Player of the Week; December: NFC Defensive Player of the Month; AP NFL Defensive Player of the Year
Samson Ebukam	Week 11: NFC Defensive Player of the Week
C. J. Anderson	Week 16: NFC Offensive Player of the Week
