= Cary Douglas Pugh =

American judge (born 1966)

Cary Pugh
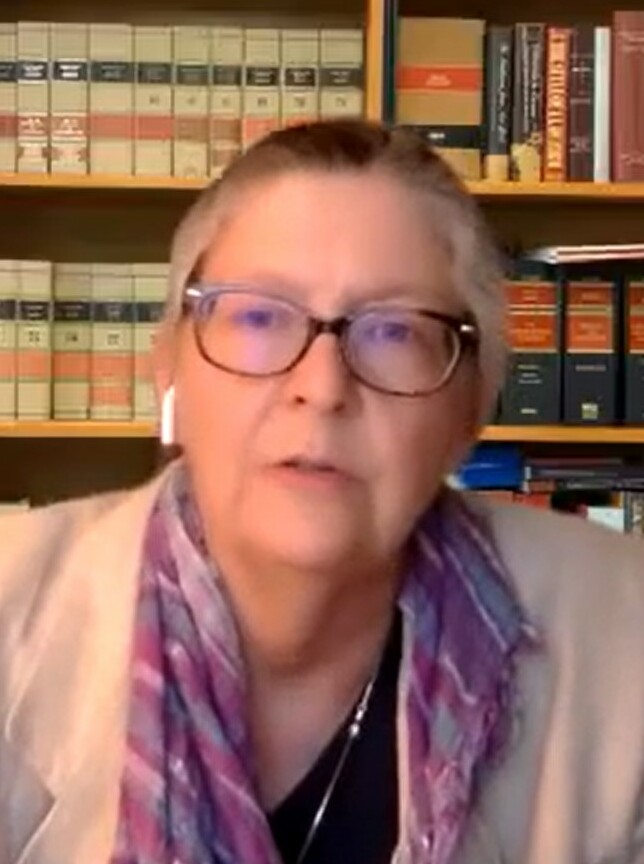
- Pugh in 2022

Judge of the United States Tax Court
- Incumbent
- Assumed office December 16, 2014
- Appointed by: Barack Obama
- Preceded by: Bob Wherry

Personal details
- Born: 1966 (age 59–60) Lynchburg, Virginia, U.S.
- Education: Duke University (BA); Stanford University (MA); University of Virginia (JD)

Cary Douglas Pugh (born 1966) is a judge of the United States Tax Court.

== Biography ==
Pugh received an Artium Baccalaureus degree, magna cum laude, in 1987, from Duke University, a Master of Arts degree, in 1988, from Stanford University and a Juris Doctor, in 1994, from the University of Virginia School of Law, where she graduated Order of the Coif. She served as a law clerk to Judge Jackson L. Kiser of the United States District Court for the Western District of Virginia from 1994 to 1995. She was an associate at Vinson & Elkins from 1995 to 1999. From 1999 to 2002, she served as Tax Counsel for the United States Senate Committee on Finance, advising committee members on individual and corporate tax issues. From 2002 to 2005, she was the Special Counsel to the Chief Counsel of the United States Internal Revenue Service. Since 2005, she has served as counsel in the tax department at Skadden, Arps, Slate, Meagher & Flom, LLP.

=== Faculty service ===
Pugh has served as an adjunct professor at the Georgetown University School of Law's Master of Laws program.

== United States Tax Court ==
On June 9, 2014, President Barack Obama nominated Pugh to be a Judge of the United States Tax Court for a term of fifteen years, to the seat vacated by Judge Robert Wherry who retired from the court. On November 20, 2014 the United States Senate confirmed her by voice vote.

Following confirmation, she was appointed by President Barack Obama as Judge of the United States Tax Court, on December 16, 2014 for a term ending December 15, 2029.

== See also ==
- United States Tax Court

Legal offices
Preceded by Bob Wherry	Judge of the United States Tax Court; 2014–present	Incumbent
