= Gough (disambiguation) =

Gough is a surname.

Gough may also refer to:

== Places ==
- Gough, Georgia, United States, an unincorporated community and census-designated place
- Gough County, New South Wales, Australia
- Gough Glacier, Antarctica
- Gough Island, a volcanic British island in the South Atlantic Ocean
- Gough Lake, Alberta, Canada

== Given name ==
- Gough McCormick (1874–1924), English cleric, Dean of Manchester from 1920
- Gough Whitlam (1916–2014), Prime Minister of Australia from 1972 to 1975

== Other uses ==
- Gough Street, Hong Kong
- Viscount Gough, a title in the Peerage of the United Kingdom
- Gough finch (Rowettia goughensis), a finch-like bird from the Gough Island
- Gough moorhen (Gallinula comeri), native to Gough Island
- "Gough" (song), a song by The Whitlams

== See also ==
- Gough Map, the oldest surviving road map of Great Britain
- Gough/Stewart platform, a type of parallel robot
