= Robert Wherry (judge) =

American judge (born 1944)

Bob Wherry

Senior Judge of the United States Tax Court
- In office April 1, 2014 – January 1, 2018

Judge of the United States Tax Court
- In office April 23, 2003 – April 1, 2014
- Appointed by: George W. Bush
- Preceded by: Laurence Whalen
- Succeeded by: Cary Pugh

Personal details
- Born: Robert Allen Wherry Jr. April 7, 1944 (age 81); Langley Field, Virginia, U.S. (now Langley Air Force Base)
- Education: University of Colorado, Boulder (BS, JD); New York University (LLM)

Robert Allen Wherry Jr. (born April 7, 1944 in Langley Field, Virginia) is a former judge of the United States Tax Court.

== Education and career ==
Wherry earned his Bachelor of Science from the University of Colorado and his Juris Doctor from the University of Colorado School of Law, followed by a Master of Laws in Taxation from the New York University Law School. He is a fellow and former regent of the American College of Tax Counsel and a former chairman of the Taxation Section of the Colorado Bar Association. He has served as chairman of the Small-Business Tax Committee of the Colorado Association of Commerce and Industry, as president of the Greater Denver Tax Counsel Association, is a past chairman of the Administrative Practice Committee of the American Bar Association Tax Section, a member of the Council, and a member of the Advisory Committee of the American Bar Association Section of Dispute Resolution. He is listed in The Best Lawyers in America (in tax litigation). His articles have appeared in ALI-ABA publications, The Colorado Lawyer, Tax Notes, and State Tax Notes. He is the former Colorado correspondent for State Tax Notes and has spoken at numerous tax institutes, including the University of Denver Tax Institute and Tulane University Tax Institute and American Bar Association Tax Section programs. He was an instructor in Tax Court litigation for the National Institute for Trial Advocacy.

Wherry was appointed by President George W. Bush as Judge, United States Tax Court, on April 23, 2003, for a term ending April 22, 2018. He retired from the Tax Court bench effective January 1, 2018.

== Attribution ==
Material on this page was copied from the website of the United States Tax Court, which is published by a United States government agency, and is therefore in the public domain.

Legal offices
Preceded by Laurence Whalen	Judge of the United States Tax Court; 2003–2014	Succeeded by Cary Pugh
