= Goffs, West Virginia =

Unincorporated community in West Virginia, US

Coordinates: 39°05′24″N 81°02′04″W

Goffs is an unincorporated community in Ritchie County, in the U.S. state of West Virginia.

== History ==
A post office called Goffs was established in 1861, and remained in operation until 1972. Thomas Goff, an early postmaster, gave the community his name.
