= Gough Lake =

Lake in Alberta, Canada

- Location within Alberta
- Location: Alberta, Canada
- Coordinates: 52.027897°N 112.457318°W

Gough Lake is a lake in Alberta, Canada.

Gough Lake has the name of a government surveyor.
