= Le Goff =

- Pronunciation: pronounced [lə ɡɔf]

Origin
- Origin: Breton
- Meaning: the smith
- Region of origin: Brittany

Other names
- Variant form: Le Goffic

Le Goff is a Breton surname. Its English equivalent is Smith. Notable people with the name include:

- Eugène Le Goff (1909-1998), French racing cyclist
- Élie Le Goff (1858-1938), French sculptor
- Jack Le Goff (1931-2009), French equestrian and coach
- Jacques Le Goff (1924-2014), French historian and author
- Nicolas Le Goff (born 1992), French volleyball player
- Vincent Le Goff (born 1989), French footballer
- Yves Le Goff (1907-1988), French racing cyclist

== See also ==
- Goff (disambiguation)
