= Goff =

Origin
- Meaning: 1. Godly person / strong warrior / a high priest, 2. "smith" 3. "son of Eochaidh / Eachaidh; 4. "red haired"
- Region of origin: Germanic countries, Celtic countries, Israel, France

Other names
- Variant forms: Gough, McGough, Goffstein

Goff is a surname of Celtic origin. It is the 946th most common family name in the United States. When the surname originates from England it is derived from an occupational name from Welsh, Cornish or Breton. The Welsh gof and the Breton goff means "smith" (cognate with Irish gobha). The English-originating surname is common in East Anglia, where it is of Breton origin. The Welsh name is a variant of the surname Gough, and is derived from a nickname for someone with red hair. The native Irish name is derived from a patronymic form of the Gaelic personal name Eochaidh/Eachaidh, which means "horseman".

== Notable people ==
- Alex Goff (died 2010), Belizean shooting victim
- Barbara Goff, classics professor
- Bruce Goff, architect
- Darius Goff (1809–1891), industrialist and businessman
- Frederick R. Goff (1916–1982), librarian
- Greg Goff, American college baseball coach
- Guy D. Goff (1866–1933), US Senator from West Virginia
- H. N. Goff, American politician and businessman
- Harper Goff, American artist, musician, and actor
- Harriet Newell Kneeland Goff (1828–1901), American author, temperance reformer
- Helen Lyndon Goff author, better known as P. L. Travers the creator of Mary Poppins
- Jared Goff, American football quarterback
- Jacques Le Goff, French historian
- Jerry Goff, American baseball player
- John William Goff (1848–1924), American lawyer and politician from New York
- Jonathan Goff, American football player
- Keli Goff, American journalist, playwright and screenwriter
- Kellen Goff, American voice actor
- Kenneth Goff (1914–1972), American anti-communist
- Martyn Goff (1923–2015), British author, bookseller and literary administrator
- Mike Goff (baseball), professional baseball player/manager
- Mike Goff (American football), American football player
- Nathan Goff Jr., member of the United States Congress
- Phil Goff, former leader of the Labour Party of New Zealand
- Philip Goff (philosopher), British philosopher
- Ray Goff, American football player and coach
- Reginald Goff (1907–1980), English judge
- Robert Goff (football player), American football player
- Robert Goff, Baron Goff of Chieveley (1926–2016), British judge and law lord
- Shuwanza Goff, American political advisor
- Sir Park Goff, 1st Baronet, British Conservative party politician, MP
- Sidney Clayton Goff (1861–1935), American dentist and politician
- Stan Goff (born 1951), author
- Thomas Goff (1867–1949), Irish/English landowner and politician
- Thomas William Goff (1829–1876), Irish Conservative party politician, MP
- Trish Goff (born 1976), fashion model
- William A. Goff (1929–2019), judge of the United States Tax Court

== See also ==
- Le Goff, another surname
