= Alan Powell Goffe =

British pathologist

- Born: 9 July 1920; Kingston-on-Thames, London
- Died: 13 August 1966 (aged 46)
- Known for: Development of poliomyelitis vaccine in UK, development of "Beckenham" strain of measles, setting up and leading the Department for Experimental Cytology at the Wellcome Research Laboratories
- Scientific career
- Fields: Pathology, virology
- Institutions: Central Public Health Laboratory, Wellcome Research Laboratories

Alan Powell Goffe (9 July 1920 – 13 August 1966) was a British pathologist whose research contributed to the development and improvement of vaccines, most notably the polio and measles vaccines. He was a Fellow of the Royal Microscopical Society, a Fellow of the Royal Society of Medicine and a member of the Pathological Society of Great Britain and Ireland. At the time of his death, he was the head of the Department of Experimental Cytology at the Wellcome Research Laboratories.

== Education ==
Goffe was born in 1920 to a Jamaican father and an English mother, both of whom were practicing physicians. After attending Epsom College in Surrey, England, Goffe graduated in 1944 from University College Hospital with a medical degree. Goffe then specialised in pathology, first as a Pathological Assistant at the London Hospital and then at the Central Public Health Laboratory, taking some time out from the latter to complete a Diploma in Bacteriology at the London School of Hygiene & Tropical Medicine.

== Career ==
During his two years serving as a Specialist in Pathology in the Royal Army Medical Corps, some of which was spent in Egypt, he turned his focus to intestinal pathogens such as typhoid.

Once his national service had been completed, Goffe returned to the Central Public Health Laboratory, where he studied the poliomyelitis virus and helped to introduce cutting-edge techniques developed by Enders in the US to the UK. He set up a tissue-culture laboratory, worked on preparing inactivated versions of the virus; and was a member of a Medical Research Council (United Kingdom) committee aiming to bring learning from the US to develop a vaccine in Britain.

In 1955, Goffe moved to the Wellcome Research Laboratories in Kent, where he worked as the Chief Medical Virologist. During his time at Wellcome, he made important contributions not only to poliomyelitis vaccines, but also led the development of an attenuated measles strain known as the "Beckenham" (also sometimes known as the "Goffe") strain. Goffe was involved in numerous clinical trials to test vaccines, publicly testing them on himself and his family to demonstrate his confidence in their safety. His interest in how some viruses could cause tumours led him to study the SV40 virus and the human wart virus, human papillomavirus.

Two years before his death, he was given the task of setting up a new Department of Experimental Cytology, unusual in that it was the first department dedicated to fundamental research at the Wellcome Laboratories.

== Personal life ==
Goffe and his wife Elisabeth, who was a teacher, married in 1943 and had five children. Their son, Hugh died from bone cancer aged 15, after which they set up the Hugh Goffe Foundation in his memory. At the age of 46, Goffe was drowned in an accident whilst sailing near the Isle of Wight.

== See also ==
- Alfred Constantine Goffe
