= Alfred Constantine Goffe =

Jamaican business man

Alfred Constantine Goffe (30 December 1863 – 27 October 1951) was a Jamaican businessman noted for his role in the banana trade.

Alfred was born in Jamaica to John Beecham Goffe and Margaret Goffe (née Clemetson). He was the fourth of nine children. A niece, Eileen Clemetson-Goffe joined the British Women's Auxiliary Territorial Service and in 1936 became a spy for the allies in WWII and later a diplomat. She hid her race and passed as white. Her father was Cecil, the second eldest of the Goffe brothers. A Nephew, Alan Powell Goffe developed the polio and measles vaccines. His father was Earnest. Alfred, Earnest and Cecil all married white women, in a time of Jim Crow and the Edwardian era.

The Goffe brothers, John Jr., Cecil, Robert, Alfred, Alec, Ernest, Clarence and Rowland took over proprietorship along with their mother of their late fathers businesses in Port Maria after he died of Malaria on 17 October 1882. By 1887 the most profitable export from St. Mary was a weed, whose export value exceeded that of sugar and coffee in 1893–94, and they excelled, moving hundreds of tons of logwood to the United States. In 1896 they sent 500 tons to Falmouth, U.K. After the market died for logwood, the brothers began exporting bananas in ernest.

In 1908, Goffe was arrested and charged with conspiring with organized crime in the attempted murder of a business rival. This was based on the testimony of one alleged witness. Charges were dropped against Goffe due to the testimony describing him as conspiring in Italian. Goffe was able to produce witness who attested to his not knowing the language. Goffe also killed a man in Galina for the theft of 30 coconuts from his groves. He was later acquitted.

== Banana king ==
The Gleaner, a Jamaican newspaper, had reported on the exporter in 1920, saying there were two men who had garnered respect from Jamaicans, one was Marcus Garvey the Pan-African leader, and the other was the banana king, A.C.Goffe. A primary exporter along with his brothers and Italian partner Antonio Lanasa in the Lanasa & Goffe Steamship and Importing company; established Jan 4, 1906 in Baltimore, Maryland. Together they purchased bananas from the small landowners not signed to the white (American monopoly) competition in St. Mary Parish and chartered steamships to transport the yellow fruit to the Port of Baltimore, where they had a distribution network in place to quickly get the fruit from the island of Jamaica to the US market.

They inaugurated the company when two days later the partners boarded ship bound for Kingston harbor on the S.S.Targus, captained by Capt. Doughty. The crossing broke the record and while delayed by a storm, arrived two days early. Goffe thought the mass of reporters and wellwishers were there for his venture, but discovered that the speed of the crossing, five days, was the cause of the hubbub.

By 1909 the company was one of the largest importers of bananas to the east via the newly rebuilt Baltimore docks and existing railroads.

== Lee wharf ==
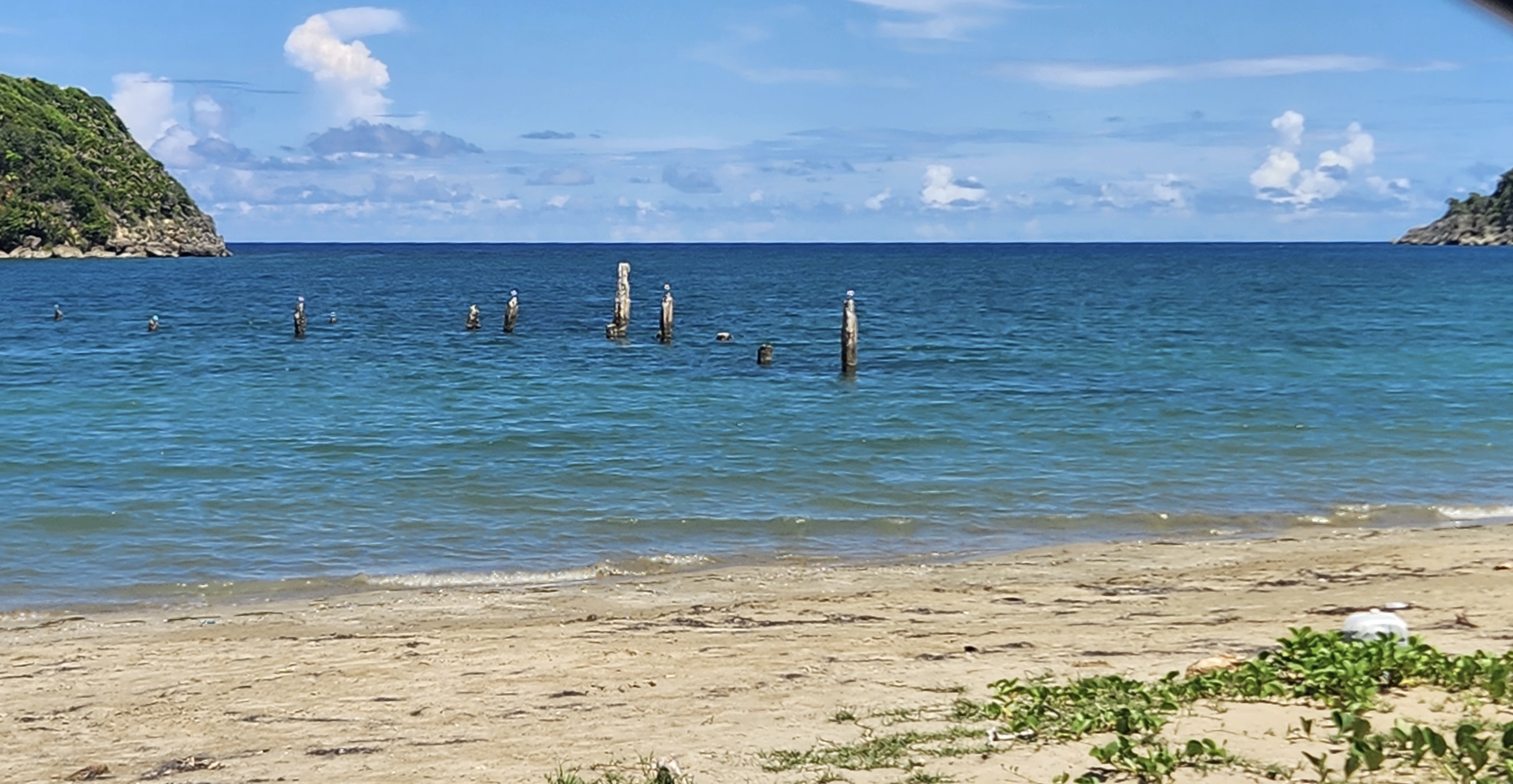
Lee's Pier remnants

The crossing showed that bananas only needed four days to get to Baltimore, where 100-150 boxcars were needed to send the cargo up and down the east coast and west to middle America. At the time, A.C.GOFFE had inherited his father's businesses in Port Maria, one of which was the Lee Wharf, a pier 100 ft long with a sordid past. Along with its warehouse, Goffe could store 15,000 bunches of bananas while readying for shipment. Lee Wharf had been a part of the slave trade and the warehouse a slave auction pit. Along with his brothers he set up Messers Goffe Brothers, a Port Maria Banana purchasing firm in 1897.

In 1901 he created the St. Mary Fruit Growers Association. A co-operative, it was an effort to get higher prices per bunch for the Jamaican planters, chartering a ship and engaging small growers to join the co-op. The venture was successful, but the operation was a one-man, one boat, load that could not compete against the larger exporters. However, because he introduced competition, prices per bunch paid by exporters rose from 9 pence a bunch to 1 shilling 6 pence. For a year he courted a former employee of the large exporter, Antonio Lanasa, an Italian who had an import company at the port of Baltimore and a distribution network already in place.

At Port Maria, six or seven steamships could load at once, making it the largest port on the north coast after Port Antonio. After loading there, the ship proceeded to Annatto Bay and loaded more bananas. A total of 200 laborers could load a ship on the Jamaican side, in Baltimore 249-401 dock workers unloaded the ship in a day. Before the Great Baltimore fire the ships were unloaded to barges, which transferred the goods to the railhead. After the fire, the city purchased the docks from a private owner and dredged the channels, building new piers to allow direct unloading from ship to the dock, speeding the process. Goffe chartered better steamships and was able to beat the larger operators to the railhead, prospering in the process.

By 1909 his main competition were United Fruit and the Atlantic Fruit Company which had contracts with the large plantations, the Italian-Jamaican combination of Goffe and Lanasa became the small planters friends in the industry. Island wide, support was in favor of the locals as they were actively touting patriotism and convinced many that they were the right choice. While paying less for produce, they appealed to planters and many supported the firm over higher prices paid by the larger outfits.

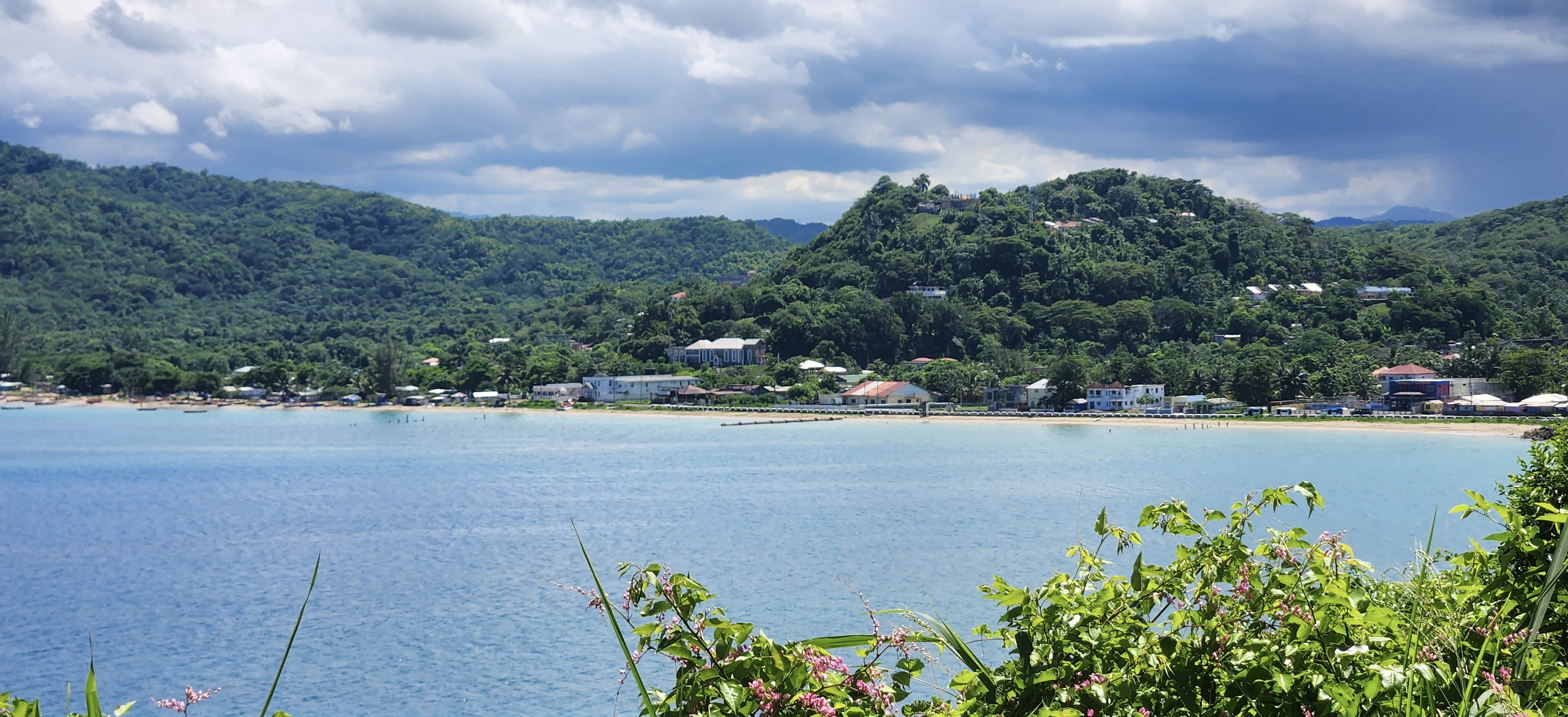
Port Maria seafront, Pagee beach

The Day-Oh (Banana boat song) chant made popular by singer Harry Belafonte was originally sung by the banana laborers on the St. Mary docks.

== Death ==
Alfred Goffe died of a stroke on 27 October 1951 at 87, following a devastating hurricane which damaged crops and killed 154. Heartbroken over the loss of his bananas and coconut trees leveled by the storm he lay in bed like a baby at Rivers Dene, his St. Mary estate, until the stroke killed him. When banana was king in Jamaica, the banana king was a notorious Jamaican who fought for and against the monopoly and was a hotelier, shipping magnate and founded one of Jamaicas first agricultural cooperatives.

A street in Galina is named after him. The St. Mary's Parish Church's South Transept was renamed the Goffe Memorial Chapel in 1944. For a while, Jamaicans took to naming babies Lanasa, the Italian partners last name.

== See also ==
- A.C. Goffe's Windsor Hotel, St. Ann's Bay, Jamaica - Govt run girls home today
- Alan Powell Goffe
