= Goff's Caye =

Coordinates: 17°20′56″N 88°2′14″W

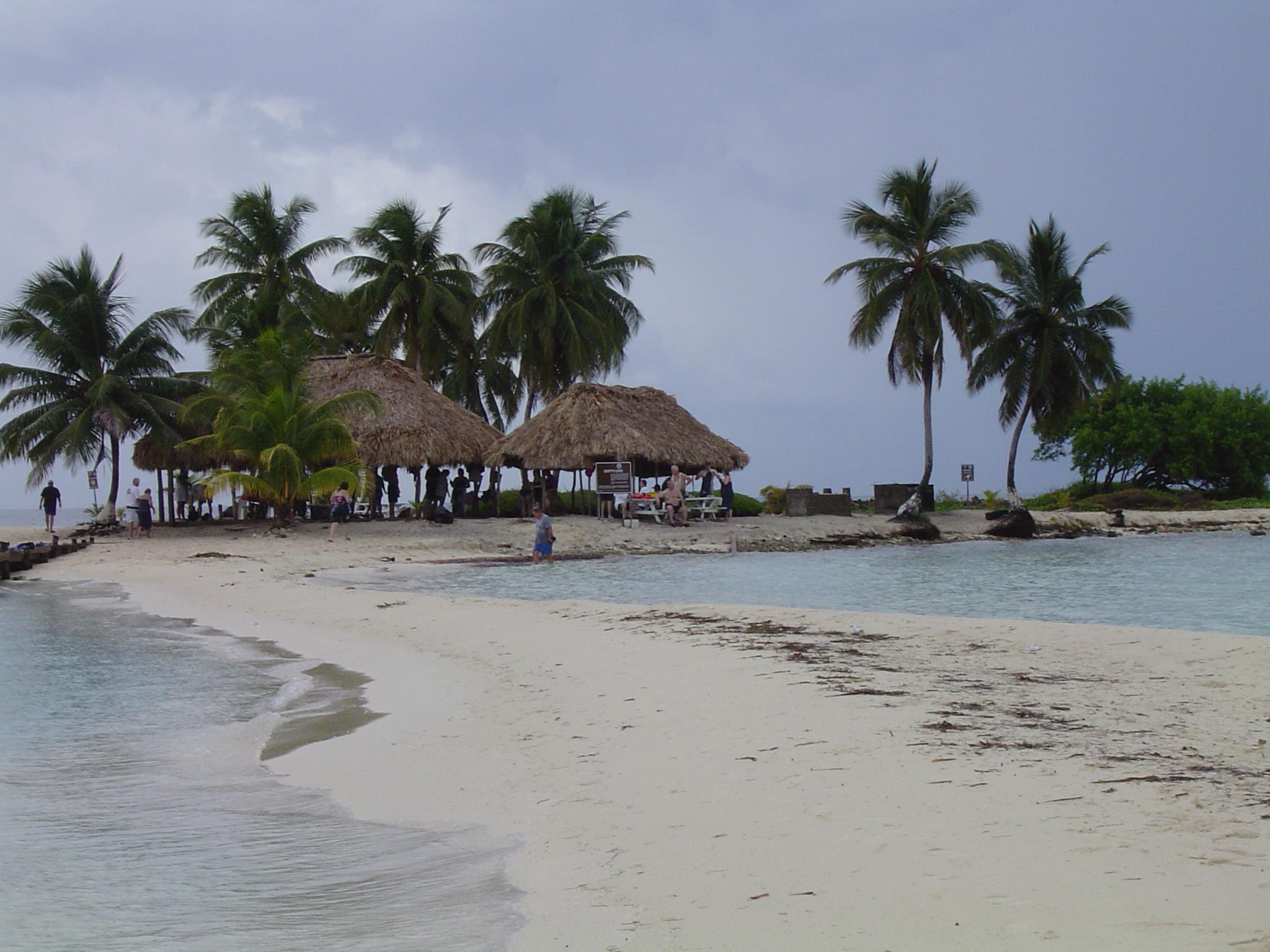
Goff's Caye

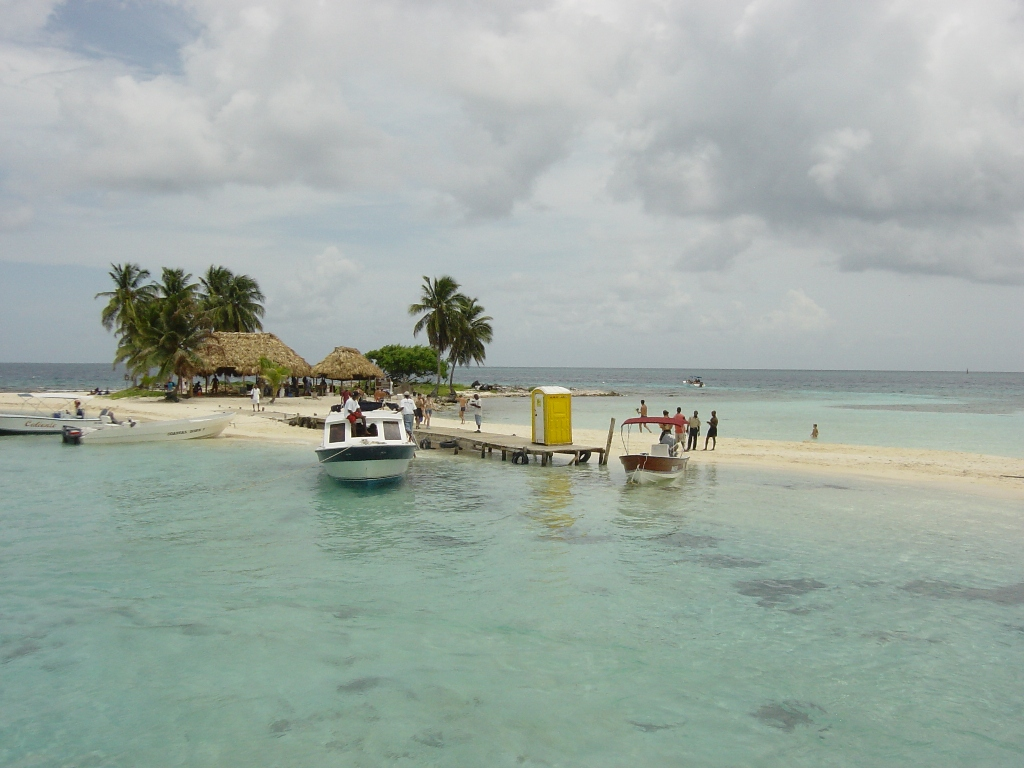
Goff's Caye

Goff's Caye (Spanish: Cayo Goff) is a small island off the shore of Belize City, Belize. It sits right on the edge of the Belize Barrier Reef with waters to the south and east being only 0.6 to 3 metres (2 ft 0 in to 9 ft 10 in) deep.

Goff's Caye is registered as an archaeological site due to its colonial-era settlement. During colonial times, the island served as a fishing camp, trade center and cemetery. Among those interred in the cemetery are crew members from HMS Blossom who died of yellow fever during a visit to the colony in August 1830.

Goff's Caye is one of the few small islands in Belize that is not privately owned. The island is considered public land and is managed by the Coastal Zone Management Authority and Institute. It is frequently used by Belizeans and cruise ship tourists for recreational purposes.

== Ecosystem ==
The reef off Goff's Caye is considered to be one of the best representatives of a healthy reef system. The area to the northwest of the Caye is known to be a foraging area for sea turtles.
