= William A. Goff =

American judge (1929–)

William Arthur Goff (1929 – 2019) was a judge of the United States Tax Court from 1971 to 1986.

== Early life and education ==
Born in Sulphur, Oklahoma, later in life he changed the spelling of his surname "to conform to a traditional family spelling favored by some of his earlier ancestors".

Goff obtained a B.B.A. from the University of Oklahoma College of Business Administration in 1951 and an LL.B. from the University of Oklahoma College of Law in 1956. He was admitted to the Oklahoma Bar in 1956 and practiced in the Federal District Courts of Oklahoma and the U.S. Court of Appeals for the 10th Circuit.

== Career ==
Goff served in the United States Air Force from 1951 to 1953 as an auditing officer and continued in the Air Force Reserve, reaching the rank of captain.

From 1956 to 1960, Goff worked as an attorney in the Office of Chief Counsel at the Internal Revenue Service. He then practiced law in Tulsa, Oklahoma, at the firm Martin, Logan, Moyers, Martin & Conway.

Goff took the oath of office as a Tax Court judge on November 4, 1971, and retired on November 3, 1986. Goff also served on the advisory board of the Southwestern Law Journal and the visitor's board of Southern Methodist University.
