= Goff Homestead =

Historic house in Massachusetts, United States

- U.S. National Register of Historic Places
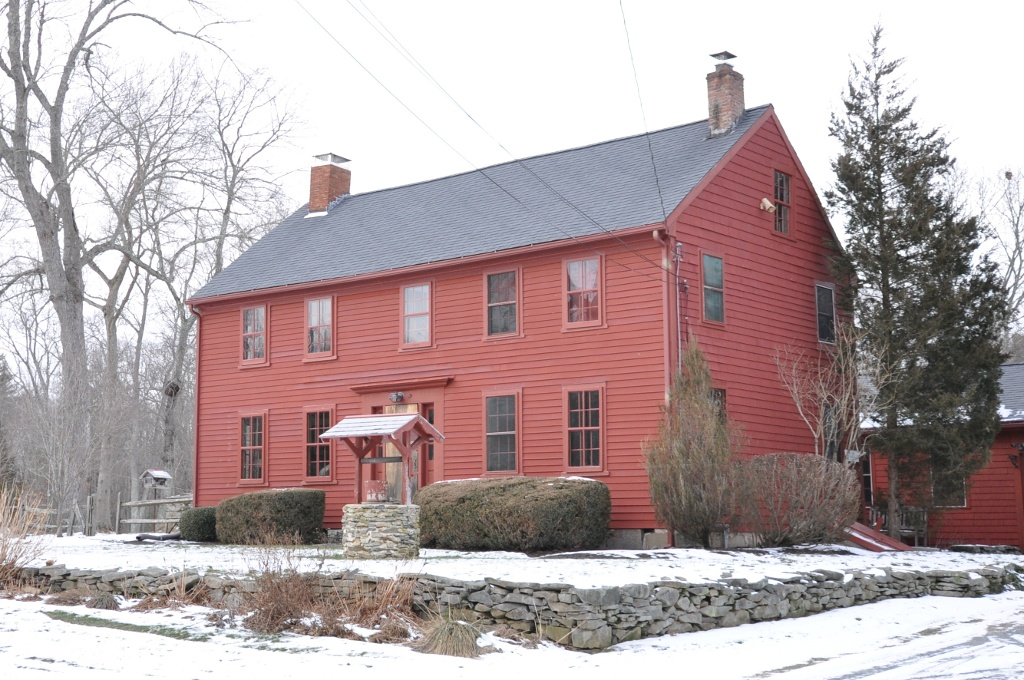

- Location within Massachusetts Location within the United States
- Location: Rehoboth, Massachusetts
- Coordinates: 41°50′50″N 71°13′27″W
- Built: 1750
- Architectural style: Georgian
- MPS: Rehoboth MRA
- NRHP reference No.: 83000673
- Added to NRHP: June 6, 1983

The Goff Homestead is a historic colonial American house at 40 Maple Lane in Rehoboth, Massachusetts. This 2 1/2-story wood-frame house was built c. 1750–80, and is an extremely rare local example of a Georgian period house with end chimneys (rather than a single central chimney more typical of the time). The chimney design is particularly idiosyncratic, and is found in Massachusetts in only one other house, also located in Rehoboth. The house was in the hands of the locally prominent Goff family from 1784 to c. 1920.

The house was listed on the National Register of Historic Places in 1983.

== See also ==
- National Register of Historic Places listings in Bristol County, Massachusetts
