= Goff Farm =

- U.S. National Register of Historic Places
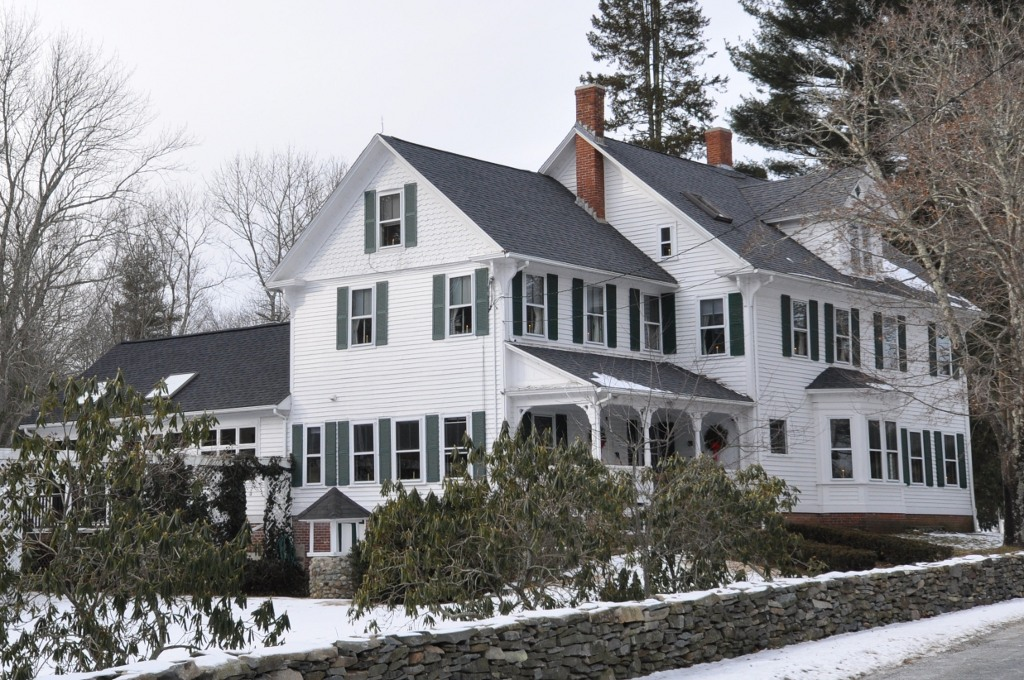

- Location within Massachusetts Location within the United States
- Location: Rehoboth, Massachusetts
- Coordinates: 41°52′2″N 71°15′30″W
- Built: c.1800
- Architectural style: Italianate
- MPS: Rehoboth MRA
- NRHP reference No.: 83000672
- Added to NRHP: June 6, 1983

Goff Farm is a historic farmhouse at 157 Perryville Road in Rehoboth, Massachusetts. The 2 1/2-story wood-frame house was built c.1800, with Federal styling, as a single-story residence. It was extensively remodeled in 1897, adding the second floor and Italianate features. The house retains significant interior details, including polished brass hardware and varnished wood paneling. Members of the Goff family were prominent in local politics, and their farmland was in active use until its acquisition for the Rehoboth Country Club.

The house was listed on the National Register of Historic Places in 1983, where it is listed at 158 Perryville Road.

== See also ==
- National Register of Historic Places listings in Bristol County, Massachusetts
